= Yang Xi (Three Kingdoms) =

Chinese Shu Han state official (died 261)

- 楊戲

Colonel of Trainee Archers (射聲校尉)
- In office ?–c. 258
- Monarch: Liu Shan

Administrator of Zitong (梓潼太守)
- In office ?–?
- Monarch: Liu Shan

Army Supervisor Who Protects the Army (護軍監軍)
- In office ?–?
- Monarch: Liu Shan

Administrator of Jianning (建寧太守)
- In office 234 – 243
- Monarch: Liu Shan

Personal details
- Born: late 200s Pengshan District, Meishan, Sichuan
- Died: 261
- Occupation: Politician
- Courtesy name: Wenran (文然)

Yang Xi (late 200s - 261), courtesy name Wenran, was a Chinese politician of the state of Shu Han during the Three Kingdoms period of China. He is best known for writing the Ji Han Fuchen Zan (季漢輔臣贊; pub. 241), a collection of praises of notable persons who served in the Shu Han state. Chen Shou, the third-century historian who wrote the Records of the Three Kingdoms (Sanguozhi), extensively quoted and annotated Yang Xi's collection.

== Life ==
Yang Xi was from Wuyang County (武陽縣), Qianwei Commandery (犍為郡), which is present-day Pengshan District, Meishan, Sichuan.

At a young age, Yang Xi was already quite well known in Shu. His fame put him on par with others such as Cheng Qi from Baxi Commandery, Yang Tai (楊汰) from Ba Commandery, and Zhang Biao from Shu Commandery. Yang Xi also often praised Cheng Qi as the most brilliant among the four of them. Zhuge Liang, the Imperial Chancellor of Shu, recognised and appreciated their talents.

When Yang Xi was in his 20s, he started his career as a scribe in the administrative office of Yi Province (covering present-day Sichuan and Chongqing) before rising to the position of a junior judicial officer. While in office, he reviewed and cleared difficult cases and earned praise from his colleagues for his appropriate handling of cases. He was later promoted to serve as Chief Clerk (主簿) in the Imperial Chancellor's office under Zhuge Liang.

Following Zhuge Liang's death in 234, Yang Xi became an official in the selection bureau of the imperial secretariat. Later, he became an assistant officer in the headquarters office (治中從事) under Jiang Wan, who was then the Inspector of Yi Province. After Jiang Wan rose to the position of General-in-Chief (大將軍), he reassigned Yang Xi to be an official in the east bureau of his office. Yang Xi consecutively served as an army adviser (參軍) to the General of the Household of the South (南中郎將). In 242, as the previously mentioned Zhang Biao succeeded to Ma Zhong as the Area Commander of Laixiang (庲降都督). Yang Xi was appointed to assist him as his deputy. Then, he was transferred as Administrator (太守) of Jianning Commandery (建寧郡; covering parts of present-day Yunnan and Guizhou).

Some time later, due to poor health, Yang Xi quit his post at Jianning Commandery and returned to the Shu capital Chengdu, where he served as Army Supervisor Who Protects the Army (護軍監軍) until he recovered. He was then appointed as the Administrator of Zitong Commandery (梓潼郡; around present-day Zitong County, Sichuan), and later recalled to Chengdu again to serve as Colonel of Trainee Archers (射聲校尉). While he was in office, Yang Xi gained a reputation for maintaining an honest, prudent, simple and minimalist approach towards performing his duties.

In 257, Yang Xi accompanied the Shu general Jiang Wei on a military campaign against Shu's rival state, Wei, and participated in the battle against Wei forces at Mangshui (芒水; southeast of present-day Zhouzhi County, Shaanxi). Yang Xi had all along been sceptical and suspicious of Jiang Wei. When he got drunk, he often cracked jokes and poked fun at Jiang Wei.

Although Jiang Wei appeared to tolerate Yang Xi for ridiculing him, he actually bore a grudge against Yang Xi and wanted to get back at him. After the Shu army returned from the campaign, someone reported Yang Xi to the Shu imperial court for his disrespectful behaviour. As a result, Yang Xi was removed from office and reduced to the status of a commoner. Yang Xi died a few years later in 261.

== Appraisal ==
Apart from his simple and minimalist approach towards work, Yang Xi was also known for being curt and terse when he spoke to others. He neither tried to be tactful with his words nor exchanged pleasantries and gifts with his colleagues. When he wrote letters and documents, he rarely wrote beyond one piece of paper. However, he maintained close ties with his friends, and was known for treating people with sincerity and kindness.

Yang Xi was a close childhood friend of Han Yan (韓儼) and Li Tao (黎韬), who were from Baxi Commandery. After they grew up, only Yang Xi made it to a career in the government. Han Yan could not serve because of his poor health while Li Tao, who initially made it too, was later dismissed from office for misconduct. Despite what happened to them, Yang Xi still treated them like his close friends and even provided them financial aid and helped them in their daily lives.

Around the time, many people said that the Shu official Qiao Zhou lacked talent and did not respect him much. Only Yang Xi regarded Qiao Zhou highly. He even once said: "Like us, the later generations can never be as good as this great man." Because of this, Yang Xi earned praise from others who also recognised Qiao Zhou for his talent.

== Ji Han Fuchen Zan ==
In 241, Yang Xi wrote the Ji Han Fuchen Zan (季漢輔臣贊; pub. 241), a collection of praises of notable persons who served in Shu. Chen Shou, the third-century historian who wrote the Records of the Three Kingdoms (Sanguozhi), extensively quoted and annotated Yang Xi's collection.

As the Ji Han Fuchen Zan was written in 241, it did not contain information about notable persons from Shu who died after that year. When he was writing Yang Xi's biography in the Sanguozhi, Chen Shou added information on the notable persons who died after 241 at the end of the Ji Han Fuchen Zan so as to allow readers to have a rough understanding of these persons' lives.

A list of persons whom Yang Xi praised in his Ji Han Fuchen Zan (in order of mention):

- Liu Bei
- Zhuge Liang
- Xu Jing
- Guan Yu
- Zhang Fei
- Ma Chao
- Fa Zheng
- Pang Tong
- Huang Zhong
- Dong He
- Deng Fang (Note: Deng Fang (鄧方), whose courtesy name was Kongshan (孔山), was from Nan Commandery (南郡; around present-day Jingzhou, Hubei). He initially served as an assistant officer under Liu Bei when the latter was the Governor of Jing Province. In 214, after Liu Bei seized control of Yi Province, he appointed Deng Fang as the Commandant of Qianwei Commandery (犍為郡; around present-day Meishan, Sichuan). He was later reassigned to various positions including Administrator of Zhuti Commandery (朱提太守), General Who Pacifies Distant Lands (安遠將軍), and Area Commander of Laixiang (庲降都督). He was stationed at Nanchang County (南昌縣; present-day Zhenxiong County, Yunnan) throughout that period of time. He died in 222. As much of the information about his life was lost over the course of history, Chen Shou could not write a biography for him in the Sanguozhi. According to the Huayang Guo Zhi, Deng Fang was not interested in material wealth. He was also known as resolute and determined in his actions. Thanks to this attitude, both the Han civilians and local tribes respected his position and personally trusted him.)
- Fei Guan (Note: Fei Guan (費觀), whose courtesy name was Binbo (賔伯), was from Meng County (鄳縣), Jiangxia Commandery (江夏郡), which is present-day Xinyang, Henan. He had familial ties to Liu Zhang, the Governor of Yi Province: Liu Zhang's mother was a distant aunt of his. Fei Guan was likely from the same branch of the Fei (費) clan as Fei Boren (費伯仁), making him a relative of Fei Yi. He also married Liu Zhang's daughter. In 213, he joined Li Yan, then a general under Liu Zhang, in resisting an invasion of Yi Province by Liu Bei. After their defeat, both Fei Guan and Li Yan surrendered and joined Liu Bei. After Liu Bei seized control of Yi Province from Liu Zhang in 214, he commissioned Fei Guan as a Major-General (裨將軍) and later appointed him as the Administrator of Ba Commandery (巴郡; covering parts of present-day Chongqing). Fei Guan later became the Area Commander of Jiangzhou (江州都督) in present-day Chongqing. In 221, after Liu Bei declared himself emperor of Shu, he enfeoffed Fei Guan as a Marquis of a Chief Village (都亭侯) and appointed him as General Who Inspires Might (振威將軍). Fei Guan was known for being a sociable person who got along well with most people. His colleague Li Yan was a proud man who did not make friends easily, even with people around the same age as him. Fei Guan was over 20 years younger than Li Yan, yet Li Yan treated him like a close friend. Fei Guan died at the age of 36 in an unknown year. As much of the information about his life was lost over the course of history, Chen Shou could not write a biography for him in the Sanguozhi.)
- Wang Lian
- Liu Ba
- Mi Zhu
- Wang Mou
- He Zong (Note: He Zong (何宗), whose courtesy name was Yanying (彥英), was from Pi County, Shu Commandery (蜀郡). In his early days, he and Du Qiong studied under the tutelage of the scholar Ren An, and later became more famous than Du Qiong. When Liu Zhang was the Governor of Yi Province, he appointed He Zong as the Administrator of Qianwei Commandery (犍為郡; around present-day Meishan, Sichuan). In 214, after Liu Bei seized control of Yi Province from Liu Zhang, he appointed He Zong as an assistant officer and libationer (從事祭酒). In 221, He Zong was among the officials who urged Liu Bei to declare himself emperor to challenge the legitimacy of Cao Pi, who usurped the throne from Emperor Xian in 220 and ended the Eastern Han dynasty. After Liu Bei became emperor and established the Shu state, he appointed He Zong as his Minister Herald (大鴻臚). He Zong died sometime during the Jianxing era (223–237) of Liu Shan's reign. As much of the information about his life was lost over the course of history, Chen Shou could not write a biography for him in the Sanguozhi. He Zong's son, He Shuang (何雙), had the courtesy name Han'ou (漢偶). He was known for his humour and wit, and has been compared to Chunyu Kun and Dongfang Shuo. He served as the Chief of Shuangbai County and died at a relatively young age. He had a son, He Sui. He Sui has his own biography in Volume 11 of the Huayang Guo Zhi.)
- Du Wei
- Zhou Qun
- Wu Yi
- Li Hui
- Zhang Yi
- Huang Quan
- Yang Hong
- Zhao Yun
- Chen Dao
- Fu Kuang (Note: Fu Kuang (輔匡), whose courtesy name was Yuanbi (元弼), was from Xiangyang, Jing Province. After Liu Bei seized control of Yi Province in 214, he appointed Fu Kuang as the Administrator of Ba Commandery (巴郡; covering parts of present-day Chongqing). Fu Kuang also participated in the Battle of Xiaoting of 221–222 and served as a detachment commander in the Shu army. During the Jianxing era (223–237) of Liu Shan's reign, Fu Kuang served as General Who Guards the South (鎮南將軍) and later rose to the position of General of the Right (右將軍). He was also enfeoffed as a Marquis of a Central District (中鄉侯).)
- Liu Yong (Note: Liu Yong (劉邕), whose courtesy name was Nanhe (南和), was from Yiyang Commandery (義陽郡; around present-day Zaoyang, Hubei) in Jing Province. After Liu Bei seized control of Yi Province in 214, he appointed Liu Yong as the Administrator of Jiangyang Commandery (江陽郡; around present-day Neijiang, Sichuan). During the Jianxing era (223–237) of Liu Shan's reign, Liu Yong rose to the position of General of the Rear Who Supervises the Army (監軍後將軍) and received the peerage of a Secondary Marquis (關內侯). After he died, Liu Shi (劉式), one of his sons, inherited his peerage. Liu Yong's youngest son, Liu Wu (劉武), was known for his literary talents and was as equally famous as Fan Jian. He served in the imperial secretariat of Shu later.)
- Qin Mi
- Li Yan
- Wei Yan
- Yang Yi
- Ma Liang
- Wei Wenjing (Note: Chen Shou noted in the Sanguozhi that information about Wei Wenjing (衞文經) and Han Shiyuan (韓士元) was lost over the course of history. In his Ji Han Fuchen Zan, Yang Xi appraised Wei Wenjing as "a role model of diligence" and Han Shiyuan as "one who is mindful of his words".)
- Han Shiyuan
- Zhang Cun (Note: Zhang Cun (張存), whose courtesy name was Churen (處仁), was from Nanyang Commandery, Jing Province. He served as an assistant officer (從事) under Liu Bei when the latter was the nominal Governor of Jing Province. In the early 210s, he accompanied Liu Bei to Yi Province and was later appointed as the Administrator of Guanghan Commandery (廣漢郡; around present-day Guanghan, Sichuan). Zhang Cun had all along disliked Liu Bei's adviser Pang Tong. When Liu Bei was making a eulogy to Pang Tong after the latter was killed in battle in 214, Zhang Cun remarked: "Although it was a pity that (Pang) Tong died to prove his loyalty, he defied the principles of the greater good." An enraged Liu Bei asked: "How is (Pang) Tong's sacrifice not for the greater good?" He then removed Zhang Cun from office. Zhang Cun died of illness not long later. As much of the information about Zhang Cun's life was lost over the course of history, the third-century historian Chen Shou could not write a biography for Zhang Cun in the Sanguozhi. In his Ji Han Fuchen Zan, Yang Xi appraised Zhang Cun as "well known for being a strategist".)
- Yin Guan (Note: Yin Guan (殷觀), whose courtesy name was Kongxiu (孔休), served as an aide-de-camp (別駕從事) and later a registrar (主簿) in Jing Province under Liu Bei when the latter was the nominal Governor of Jing Province. Sometime in 209, when Liu Bei's ally Sun Quan suggested that they combine forces to conquer Yi Province, Yin Guan advised Liu Bei to consolidate his position in Jing Province and deny Sun Quan access to Yi Province so that Yi Province would only be Liu Bei's for the taking. In his Ji Han Fuchen Zan, Yang Xi appraised Yin Guan as "sometimes showing his talent, and sometimes hiding his talent".)
- Xi Zhen (Note: Xi Zhen (習禎), whose courtesy name was Wenxiang (文祥), was from Xiangyang, Jing Province. In the early 210s, he accompanied Liu Bei to Yi Province and later consecutively served as the Prefect of Luo County (雒縣; west of present-day Zhongjiang County, Sichuan), Prefect of Pi County, and Administrator of Guanghan Commandery (廣漢郡; around present-day Guanghan, Sichuan). Known for his rhetorical skills, Xi Zhen was on par with Ma Liang in fame but less famous than Pang Tong. In his Ji Han Fuchen Zan, Yang Xi appraised Xi Zhen as "sometimes showing his talent, and sometimes hiding his talent". Xi Zhen's son, Xi Zhong (習忠), served in the imperial secretariat of Shu. Xi Zhong's son, Xi Long (習隆), served as an infantry colonel and intelligence officer in Shu. Xi Zhen's sister married Pang Lin (龐林), Pang Tong's younger brother. In 208, she was separated from Pang Lin when the warlord Cao Cao invaded Jing Province and occupied Xiangyang. She only managed to reunite with Pang Lin in 222 when he and Huang Quan defected to Wei after the Battle of Xiaoting. During those 14 years of separation, she remained faithful to her husband and raised their daughter on her own. The Wei emperor Cao Pi praised her for her virtues and awarded her gifts.)
- Wang Fu
- Li Shao
- Ma Xun (Note: Ma Xun (馬勳), whose courtesy name was Shengheng (盛衡), was from Langzhong County (閬中縣), Baxi Commandery (巴西郡), which is present-day Langzhong, Sichuan. He started his career as a scribe under Liu Zhang, the Governor of Yi Province. After Liu Bei seized control of Yi Province in 214, he recruited Ma Xun to serve under him and later appointed him as an aide-de-camp (別駕從事). Ma Xun died later in an unknown year. Although Ma Xun was known for his talent throughout Yi Province, he was not as highly regarded among the people as compared to Yao Zhou. Yang Xi appraised Ma Xun in his Ji Han Fuchen Zan as "sometimes keeping quiet, and sometimes speaking up".)
- Ma Qi (Note: Ma Qi (馬齊) whose courtesy name was Chengbo (承伯), was from Langzhong County (閬中縣), Baxi Commandery (巴西郡), which is present-day Langzhong, Sichuan. He started his career as an Officer of Merit (功曹) under the general Zhang Fei, who served as the Administrator of Baxi Commandery between 214 and 219. Zhang Fei later recommended him as a talent to his lord, Liu Bei, who appointed him as an imperial secretary. During the Jianxing era (223–237) of Liu Shan's reign, Ma Qi served as an assistant official under Zhuge Liang, the Imperial Chancellor of Shu, and was later promoted to be the Administrator of Guanghan Commandery (廣漢郡; around present-day Guanghan, Sichuan). He was subsequently reassigned to be an Army Adviser (參軍) under Zhuge Liang. After Zhuge Liang's death in 234, he returned to the Shu capital Chengdu to serve in the imperial secretariat. Although Ma Qi was known for his talent throughout Yi Province, he was not as highly regarded among the people as compared to Yao Zhou. Yang Xi appraised Ma Qi in his Ji Han Fuchen Zan as "sometimes keeping quiet, and sometimes speaking up".)
- Li Fu
- Li Chao
- Gong Lu
- Wang Shi
- Feng Xi
- Zhang Nan
- Cheng Ji
- Cheng Qi
- Mi Fang
- Shi Ren
- Hao Pu
- Pan Jun

== See also ==
- Lists of people of the Three Kingdoms
