= 222 =

222 in various calendars
- Gregorian calendar: 222; CCXXII
- Ab urbe condita: 975
- Assyrian calendar: 4972
- Balinese saka calendar: 143–144
- Bengali calendar: −372 – −371
- Berber calendar: 1172
- Buddhist calendar: 766
- Burmese calendar: −416
- Byzantine calendar: 5730–5731
- Chinese calendar: 辛丑年 (Metal Ox); 2919 or 2712 — to — 壬寅年 (Water Tiger); 2920 or 2713
- Coptic calendar: −62 – −61
- Discordian calendar: 1388
- Ethiopian calendar: 214–215
- Hebrew calendar: 3982–3983
- Hindu calendars
- Vikram Samvat: 278–279
- Shaka Samvat: 143–144
- Kali Yuga: 3322–3323
- Holocene calendar: 10222
- Iranian calendar: 400 BP – 399 BP
- Islamic calendar: 412 BH – 411 BH
- Javanese calendar: 100–101
- Julian calendar: 222; CCXXII
- Korean calendar: 2555
- Minguo calendar: 1690 before ROC 民前1690年
- Nanakshahi calendar: −1246
- Seleucid era: 533/534 AG
- Thai solar calendar: 764–765
- Tibetan calendar: ལྕགས་མོ་གླང་ལོ་ (female Iron-Ox); 348 or −33 or −805 — to — ཆུ་ཕོ་སྟག་ལོ་ (male Water-Tiger); 349 or −32 or −804

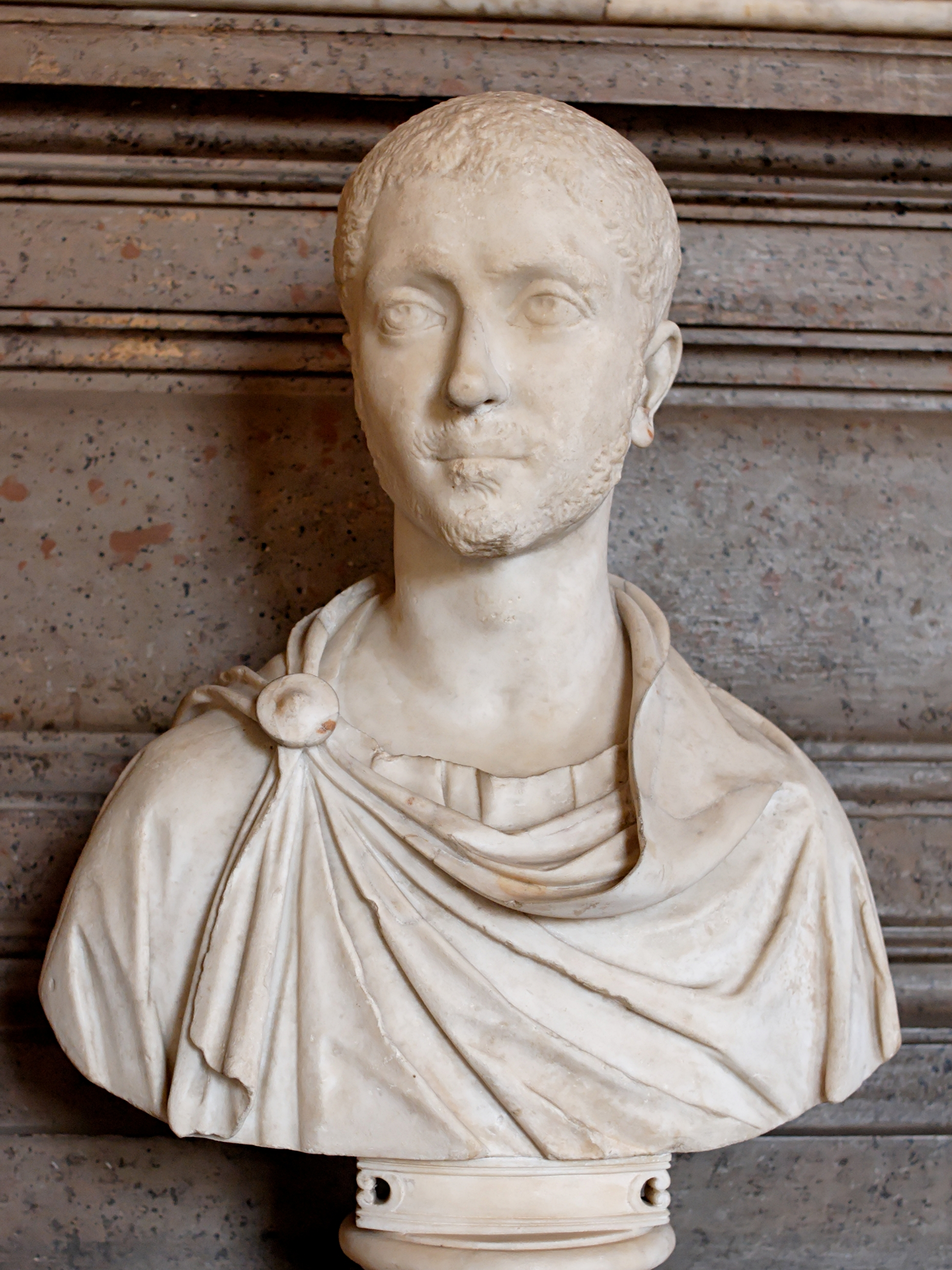
Emperor Alexander Severus

Year 222 (CCXXII) was a common year starting on Tuesday of the Julian calendar. In the Roman Empire, it was known as the Year of the Consulship of Antoninus and Severus (or, less frequently, year 975 Ab urbe condita). The denomination 222 for this year has been used since the early medieval period, when the Anno Domini calendar era became the prevalent method in Europe for naming years.

== Events ==
=== By place ===
==== Roman Empire ====
- March 13 – Emperor Elagabalus is assassinated, along with his mother, Julia Soaemias, by the Praetorian Guard during a revolt. Their mutilated bodies are dragged through the streets of Rome before being thrown into the Tiber.
- Alexander Severus succeeds Elagabalus. He is only 13 years old; his mother, Julia Avita Mamaea, governs the Roman Empire with the help of Domitius Ulpianus and a council composed of 16 senators.

==== China ====
- Battle of Xiaoting/Yiling: The Chinese state of Shu Han is defeated by Eastern Wu.

=== By topic ===
==== Commerce ====
- The silver content of the Roman denarius falls to 35 percent under emperor Alexander Severus, down from 43 percent under Elagabalus.

==== Religion ====
- October 14 – Pope Callixtus I is killed by a mob in Rome's Trastevere after a 5-year reign in which he has stabilized the Saturday fast three times per year, with no food, oil, or wine to be consumed on those days. Callixtus is succeeded by Cardinal Urban I.

== Births ==
- Marcus Aurelius Carus, Roman emperor (d. 283)
- Du Yu (or Yuankai), Chinese general and politician (d. 285)

== Deaths ==
- Elagabalus, Roman emperor (b. 203)
- Julia Soaemias, mother of Elagabalus (b. 180)
- Annia Faustina, Roman noblewoman and empress
- Bardaisan, Syriac scholar and philosopher (b. 154)
- Callixtus I, pope of the Catholic Church
- Cheng Ji (or Jiran), Chinese general
- Feng Xi (or Xiuyuan), Chinese general
- Hierocles, favourite and lover of Elagabalus
- Liu Ba (or Zichu), Chinese official and politician
- Ma Chao, Chinese general and warlord (b. 176)
- Ma Liang, Chinese diplomat and politician (b. 187)
- Xu Jing (or Wenxiu), Chinese official and politician
- Zhang Liao (or Wenyuan), Chinese general (b. 169)
