= Zhang Nan (Three Kingdoms) =

State of Shu Han military officer (died 222)

Zhang Nan 張南
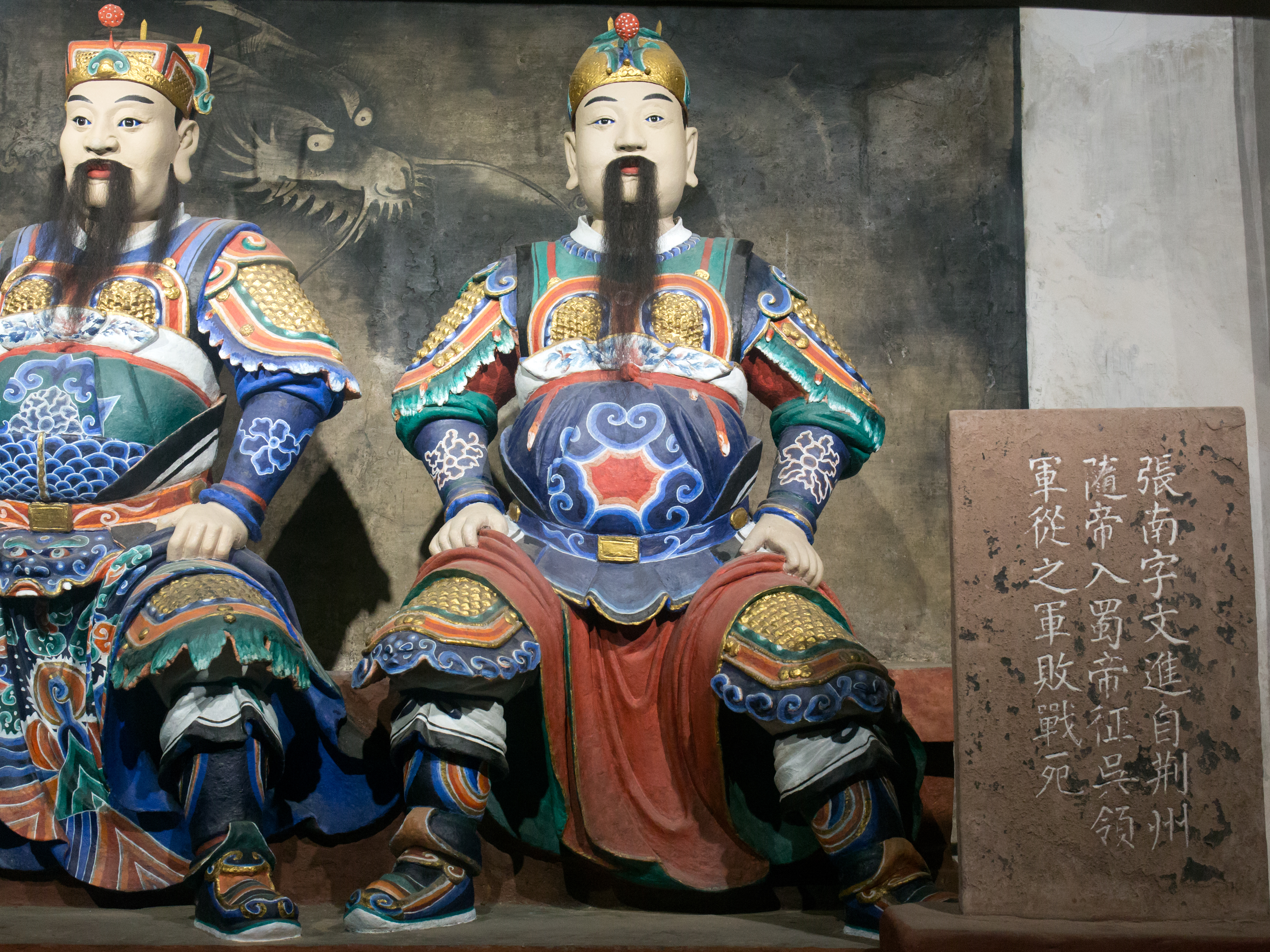
- Statue of Zhang Nan in the Zhuge Liang Memorial Temple in Chengdu, Sichuan
- Died: 222; Yidu County or Changyang County, Hubei
- Other name: Wenjin (文進)
- Occupation: Military officer

Zhang Nan (Chinese: 張南; died 222 A.D.), courtesy name Wenjin (文進), was a Chinese military officer of the state of Shu Han in the Three Kingdoms period of China.

== Life ==
Zhang Nan was originally from Jing Province (covering present-day Hubei and Hunan). He served as a military officer under Liu Bei, the founding emperor of the state of Shu Han in the Three Kingdoms era, and accompanied him to Yi Province (covering present-day Sichuan and Chongqing) in the early 210s.

In 221, Liu Bei attacked his former ally, Sun Quan (the founding emperor of Eastern Wu), after the latter broke their alliance and seized his territories in Jing Province and executed his general Guan Yu. Zhang Nan participated in this campaign, which led to the Battle of Xiaoting (or Battle of Yiling) of 221–222, and was appointed as the Vanguard (前部督) of the Shu army. In the summer of 222, Sun Quan's forces, led by Lu Xun, suddenly launched a counter-attack after about six months of stalemate since the beginning of 222. Zhang Nan was killed in action.

The Shu official Yang Xi praised Zhang Nan for his courage and mentioned that he faced the same fate as Feng Xi.

== See also ==
- Lists of people of the Three Kingdoms
