= Cheng Ji =

Cheng Ji or Ji Cheng may refer to:

People with the surname Cheng

- Cheng Ji (Shu Han) (died 222), Han dynasty military officer who later served Shu Han during the Three Kingdoms period
- Cheng Ji (Wuyue) (847–913), Tang dynasty military officer who later served the Wuyue kingdom during the Five Dynasties period
- Cheng Ji (成濟), a Cao Wei military officer in the Three Kingdoms period. He assassinated Cao Mao, the fourth Wei emperor. See Coup of Cao Mao.

People with the surname Ji

- Duke Wu of Jin
- Ji Cheng (Ming dynasty) (1582–1642), Ming dynasty garden designer
- Ji Cheng (cyclist) (born 1987), Chinese cyclist
