= Sun Huan =

Sun Huan may refer to:

- Sun Huan (Shuwu) (孫桓, fl. 200–222), style name Shuwu, Eastern Wu military general
- Sun Huan (Jiming) (孫奐, 194–234), style name Jiming, fourth son of Sun Jing, Eastern Wu military general
