= Guli =

Guli may refer to:

== Places ==
- Guli, Bangladesh, a village
- Guli, Ingushetia, village
- Guli, West Azerbaijan, a village
- Guli Surkh, a town in north-western Tajikistan
- Guli, Guangxi, a town in south-eastern China, birthplace of Dong Xi (writer)
- Qaleh Rashid Aqa, a village in western Iran also known as Guli

== People ==
- Mina Guli, Australian businesswomen
- Pitu Guli (1865–1903), revolutionary from Ottoman Macedonia
- Guli Francis-Dehqani, Church of England bishop

== Other uses ==
- FK Pitu Guli, a football club based in Kruševo, Macedonia
- Guli, a toy as known as "marble" in Indonesia, Singapore and Malaysia

== See also ==
- Gu Li (disambiguation)
