= Battle of Xiaoting =

Battle between Shu and Wu (221–222)

- Part of the wars of the Three Kingdoms period
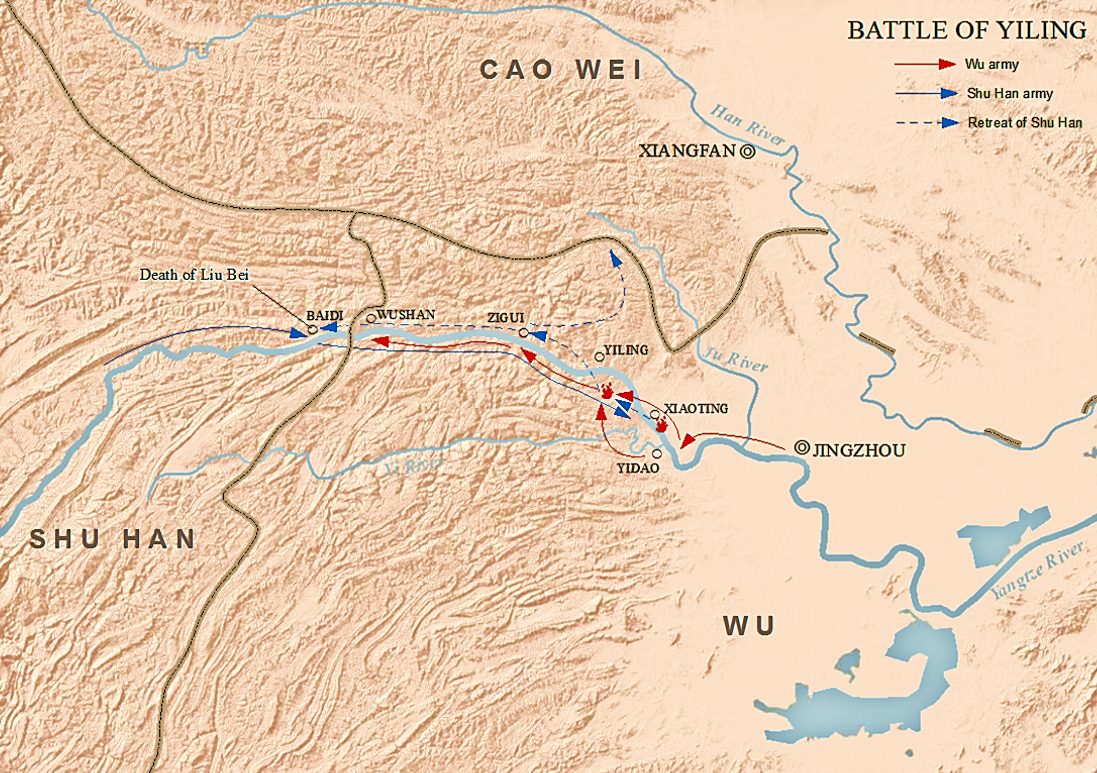
- Battle of Xiaoting/Yiling
Date	c. August 221 (Note: The campaign started in the 7th month of the 2nd year of the Huangchu era of Cao Pi's reign. This month corresponds to 6 August to 4 September 221 in the Gregorian calendar.) – c. October 222 (Note: The battle ended in the 8th month of the 3rd year of the Huangchu era of Cao Pi's reign. This month corresponds to 24 September to 22 October 222 in the Gregorian calendar.)
Location	Yiling and Xiaoting (the juncture between the west of Yidu County and east of Changyang County in Yichang, Hubei); Ma'an Hills (east of Changyang County) 30°41′31″N 111°17′13″E
Result	Eastern Wu victory

Belligerents
Eastern Wu	Shu Han; Tribal forces from Wuling

Commanders and leaders
Lu Xun; Han Dang; Ding Feng; Zhu Ran; Xu Sheng; Pan Zhang; Luo Tong; Song Qian	Liu Bei; Shamoke †; Huang Quan; Feng Xi †; Zhang Nan †; Ma Liang †; Fu Rong †; Cheng Ji †; Wu Ban; Liao Hua; Xiang Chong; Chen Shi; Wang Fu †

Strength
~50,000	40,000–60,000

Casualties and losses
Unknown	Unknown
- Location within Hubei Battle of Xiaoting (China)

The Battle of Xiaoting (Chinese: 猇亭之戰), also known as the Battle of Yiling (Chinese: 夷陵之戰) and the Battle of Yiling and Xiaoting, was fought between the Shu Han and Eastern Wu dynasties, in the years 221 and 222 during the early Three Kingdoms period of China. The battle is significant because the Eastern Wu was able to turn the situation from a series of initial losses into a defensive stalemate, before proceeding to win a decisive victory over the Shu Han. The Eastern Wu victory halted the Shu Han invasion and preceded the death of Liu Bei, Shu Han's founding emperor.

== Background ==
In late 219, Lü Meng, a general serving under Sun Quan, led an army to invade Liu Bei's territories in southern Jing Province. Guan Yu, Liu Bei's general in charge of guarding Jing Province, was away at the Battle of Fancheng and did not know about the invasion until after he returned from his Pyrrhic victory at Fancheng. He was surrounded by Sun Quan's forces in Maicheng (麥城; in Dangyang, Hubei), captured in an ambush while trying to break out of the siege, and eventually executed by Sun Quan's forces in Linju (臨沮; present-day Nanzhang County, Hubei).

On 25 November 220, Emperor Xian, the figurehead monarch of the Eastern Han dynasty, abdicated in favour of Cao Pi and ended the Eastern Han dynasty. On 11 December, Cao Pi established the state of Wei to replace the Eastern Han dynasty and became its first emperor. On 10 May 221, Liu Bei declared himself emperor of the Han, effectively establishing a new state (today known as Shu Han) in opposition to Cao Pi's Wei. Around the same time, Sun Quan shifted the capital of his territories from Gong'an County to E County, which he renamed "Wuchang" (武昌). On 23 September 221, Sun Quan pledged allegiance to Cao Pi and became a vassal of the Wei state; in return, Cao Pi awarded Sun Quan the title "King of Wu" (吳王).

== Prelude ==
Liu Bei desired to avenge Guan Yu and take back Jing Province, so he made preparations for war against Sun Quan. When Zhao Yun, a veteran general under Liu Bei, tried to dissuade his lord from going to war with Sun Quan, Liu Bei ignored him. Later, when Liu Bei launched the campaign against Sun Quan, he did not bring Zhao Yun along and instead left him behind to guard Jiangzhou. Qin Mi, an official under Liu Bei, also advised his lord against going to war with Sun Quan but ended up being thrown into prison.

Liu Bei ordered Zhang Fei to lead 10,000 troops from Langzhong to join him at Jiangzhou. During the mobilisation, Zhang Fei was assassinated by his subordinates Fan Qiang (范彊) and Zhang Da (張達), who cut off his head and brought it along with them as they defected to Sun Quan's side. Zhang Fei's adjutant wrote a report to Liu Bei. When Liu Bei heard that Zhang Fei's adjutant sent him a report, he exclaimed: "Oh! (Zhang) Fei is dead."

In August 221, Liu Bei personally led his army to attack Sun Quan. He also gave higher appointments to some mid-ranking Shu officers from Jing Province, such as Feng Xi and Zhang Nan, to further raise his army's morale for the campaign. Sun Quan sent Zhuge Jin as his representative to meet Liu Bei and start peace talks. When Zhuge Jin met Liu Bei, he said:

"I have heard that your banners and drums have arrived at Baidicheng. I fear that the ministers will argue that the King of Wu's invasion of this province will harm Guan Yu, causing deep resentment and great calamity, and that it is not advisable to make peace. This shows that you are focusing on the small matter and not paying attention to the big one. Let me discuss with Your Majesty the weight and magnitude of this matter. If Your Majesty restrains your anger and heeds my words, the decision can be made immediately without consulting the other ministers. How does Your Majesty compare Guan Yu's kinship with that of the late Emperor? How does the size of Jingzhou compare to that of the entire realm? Both are enemies, but who should be dealt with first? If you understand these factors, the matter will be as easy as turning your hand."

Liu Bei refused to listen to him.

== Battle ==
Map of present-day Hubei showing key locations of the battle: Xiaoting/Yiling, Ma'an Hills, Wu Gorge, Zigui, Baidicheng

=== Opening moves ===
In August 221, Liu Bei sent his generals Wu Ban and Feng Xi to attack the Wu positions at the Wu Gorge, which were guarded by Li Yi (李異) and Liu E (劉阿). After Wu Ban and Feng Xi achieved success, the Shu army, comprising over 40,000 troops, advanced further to Zigui County. Liu Bei also sent messengers to request reinforcements from the local tribes in Wuling Commandery (武陵郡). At Zigui, Liu Bei met up with Liao Hua, a former subordinate of Guan Yu. Liao Hua had become a prisoner-of-war in Wu after Guan Yu's death, but managed to escape and make his way back to Shu. Liu Bei appointed him as the Administrator of Yidu.

In response to the Shu invasion, Sun Quan appointed Lu Xun as his Grand Chief Controller (大都督) and ordered him to lead 50,000 troops to resist the enemy. Lu Xun had under his command several Wu officers such as Zhu Ran, Pan Zhang, Song Qian, Han Dang, Xu Sheng, Xianyu Dan (鮮于丹), and Sun Huan.

=== Shu army's approach ===
In February 222, Liu Bei planned to lead his army from Zigui (秭歸) further into Jing Province to reclaim the province. However, the Shu general Huang Quan noted that the Wu forces were powerful and had used the Yangtze to their advantage, so he volunteered to lead the attack and suggested that Liu Bei remain behind as backup. Liu Bei refused to listen to him, appointed him as General Who Guards the North (鎮北將軍), and put him in charge of a separate Shu army to defend the northern flank (the northern bank of the Yangtze) from any possible attack by Wei forces. He then personally led the main Shu army, which travelled along the southern bank of the Yangtze.

Liu Bei also ordered Wu Ban (吳班) and Chen Shi (陳式) to lead the Shu navy to Yiling on the banks of the Yangtze. In the meantime, he also sent Ma Liang as an envoy to meet the tribes in Wuling Commandery and seek to bribe their chiefs with money and official titles to win their support. As the tribes in Wuling grew restless upon the Shu army's approach, Sun Quan sent Bu Zhi to guard Yiyang and deal with any unrest.

When Wu generals wanted to attack the Shu army as it approached, Lu Xun objected and said:

"When Liu Bei led his army eastward, his morale was high, and he was able to take advantage of the high ground and strategic terrain, making him difficult to attack quickly. Even if he attacked and then retreated, it would still be difficult to completely conquer him. If there were any setbacks, it would damage our overall situation, which would be no small matter. For now, we should encourage our generals and soldiers, implement various strategies, and observe the situation. If this area were a plain and open field, we would be worried about being displaced and forced to move around. Now, marching along the mountains, our momentum is limited, and we will naturally be forced to retreat among the trees and rocks, and then we can gradually address the problem."

The Wu generals did not understand Lu Xun's reasoning and thought that he feared the enemy so they were very unhappy with him.

=== Stalemate ===
The Shu army passed through the Wu Gorge, Jianping (建平), Lianping (連平), and Lianwei (連圍), and arrived at the border of Yiling, where they constructed about 10 fortified garrisons. Liu Bei appointed Feng Xi as the Grand Controller (大督), Zhang Nan as the vanguard commander (前部督), and Fu Kuang, Zhao Rong (趙融), Liao Hua, and Fu Rong as detachment commanders (別督). The Shu and Wu forces were locked in a stalemate for about six months from February to July 222.

Liu Bei ordered Wu Ban to lead a few thousand soldiers out of the mountainous regions to set up camps on flat terrain and provoke the Wu forces to attack them. When the Wu officers wanted to respond to the taunts and attack the enemy, Lu Xun said: "This must be a trick. We should observe first."

As Lu Xun suspected, there were actually 8,000 Shu troops waiting in ambush in the nearby valleys. Since the Wu forces did not respond to the taunts, Liu Bei abandoned his plan to lure the enemy into the ambush and ordered the 8,000 soldiers to come out of the valleys. When Lu Xun heard about it, he told the Wu officers: "The reason why I did not follow your suggestions to attack the enemy is because I suspected there was something fishy about it." He then wrote a memorial to Sun Quan to emphasize the strategic importance of Yiling, point out some of Liu Bei's weaknesses, and reassure Sun Quan that he would defeat the enemy.

=== Wu counter-attack and the burning of the Shu camps ===
Several days later, the Wu officers told Lu Xun:

"We should have attacked Liu Bei in the initial stages. Now, he has advanced further in by 500 to 600 li and we have been locked in a stalemate for seven to eight months. He has reinforced all his crucial positions, so even if we attack them it will yield nothing."

Lu Xun replied:

"Liu Bei is cunning and experienced. In the initial stage, his army was very focused and its morale was very high, so we could not defeat them then. Now, however, since it has been quite some time, they are already weary, low on morale, and out of ideas. Now is the time for us to launch a multi-pronged assault on them."

Lu Xun then targeted one enemy camp and attacked it but failed to capture it. The Wu officers complained: "We are sacrificing our soldiers' lives for nothing." Lu Xun replied: "I have devised a strategy for defeating the enemy." He then ordered his men to carry a pile of straw each and launch a fire attack on the enemy. Upon the commencement of the fire attack, Lu Xun led all the Wu units on an all-out assault on the Shu forces. Zhu Ran defeated the Shu vanguard force, cut off its retreat route and forced Liu Bei to retreat. Pan Zhang's subordinates killed Feng Xi and inflicted heavy casualties on Feng's unit. Song Qian also destroyed five Shu garrisons and killed its defending officers. Zhang Nan, Shamoke (a tribal king allied with Shu), Ma Liang, and Wang Fu were killed in action, while Du Lu (杜路) and Liu Ning (劉寧) were forced to surrender to Wu. Over 40 Shu camps were destroyed by the Wu forces. Throughout the Shu army, only Xiang Chong's unit managed to retreat without sustaining any losses.

The actual location of the battle is at the juncture between the west of Yidu County and east of Changyang County in Yichang, Hubei.

=== Liu Bei's retreat to Baidicheng ===
Liu Bei and his remaining troops retreated to the Ma'an Hills (馬鞍山; east of present-day Changyang County, Hubei), where they continued to be fiercely assaulted by the Wu forces from all directions. At the same time, landslides occurred at the Ma'an Hills and caused the Shu forces to sustain thousands of casualties. The Wu general Sun Huan fought with his life and managed to break through enemy lines and capture the key positions in the hills. Liu Bei was forced to retreat through the hazardous mountainous terrain and barely escaped alive at night. During the retreat, he ordered his men to pile up their armour and set them on fire to create barriers for the pursuing Wu forces.

Liu Bei regrouped his scattered forces and ordered them to abandon their boats and travel on foot towards Yufu County, which he renamed "Yong'an" (永安; literally "everlasting peace"). The Wu officers Li Yi (李異) and Liu E (劉阿) led their troops in pursuit of Liu Bei and garrisoned at Nanshan (南山). In late September or early October 222, Liu Bei and his forces retreated further to the Wu Gorge.

By the time Liu Bei reached the safety of Baidicheng, all his boats, military equipment, and supplies had been captured by Wu forces. The dead bodies of Shu soldiers floated in the river and obstructed its flow. Liu Bei was extremely upset and furious with his defeat. He exclaimed: "Is it not the will of Heaven that I must be humiliated by Lu Xun?" When Zhao Yun showed up at Yong'an with reinforcements from Jiangzhou, the pursuing Wu forces had already retreated on their own.

== Incidents during the battle ==
=== Lu Xun refusing to help Sun Huan ===
In the earlier stages of the battle, Sun Huan led a separate force to attack the Shu vanguard force at Yidao but ended up being besieged by the enemy. He requested for reinforcements from Lu Xun but was denied. The other Wu officers told Lu Xun: "General Sun is a relative of our lord. He is currently under siege, so shouldn't we help him?" Lu Xun replied: "He has the support of his men, his base is well defended, and he has sufficient supplies. There is nothing to worry about. When my plans are in motion, even if we don't help him, the siege on him will automatically be lifted." After the Wu victory at Xiaoting, Sun Huan came to see Lu Xun and said: "Earlier on, I was indeed very resentful when you refused to help me. But now, after the victory, I see that you have your own way of doing things."

=== Wu officers' reluctance to follow Lu Xun's orders ===
Many of the Wu officers who participated in the battle had either served in Wu since Sun Ce's time or were relatives of Sun Quan's family, so they viewed themselves highly and were unwilling to follow Lu Xun's orders. Lu Xun placed his sword on the desk and said:

"Liu Bei is well known throughout the Empire, and even Cao Cao feared him. Now, he is at our borders and we have a tough fight ahead. All of you gentlemen have received grace from the State, so you should cooperate harmoniously and work together to defeat the enemy in order to repay the State's kindness. You should not be behaving as you are now. I may be a mere scholar, but I have received orders from our Lord. The reason why the State asks you to lower yourselves and submit to my command is because I have a modicum of value and I can endure humiliation for the sake of fulfilling a greater task. Each of you has your own duties so you cannot excuse yourselves from them! Military rules are long established. You shouldn't break them."

The Wu officers began to show greater respect for Lu Xun after the Wu victory, which was largely due to his strategies. Lu Xun did not report this incident to Sun Quan, who found out about it himself after the battle. When Sun Quan asked Lu Xun about it, Lu replied that he valued those officers even though they were insubordinate towards him, and decided to put up with them because he felt it was important to maintain good working relationships with them to fulfil their common goal of resisting the Shu invasion. Sun Quan praised him and rewarded him handsomely.

=== Heroics of Fu Rong and Cheng Ji ===
Fu Rong volunteered to cover the rear while the Shu forces were retreating from Yiling and Xiaoting. He continued to hold his ground firmly and vent his fury on the enemy even though all his comrades had already been killed. When the Wu soldiers called for him to surrender, he replied: "Dogs of Wu! Do you think a Han officer will ever surrender?" He was eventually killed in action.

Cheng Ji also covered the rear during the Shu retreat. As the enemy approached, someone urged him to abandon his boat and escape, but he replied: "I have never fled from battle throughout my military career. Besides, the Emperor is currently in a dangerous situation." When the Wu forces showed up, Cheng Ji wielded a ji, fought fiercely and managed to sink some enemy boats before he was eventually overwhelmed by the enemy and killed.

=== Cao Pi foreseeing Liu Bei's defeat ===
When Cao Pi received news that the Shu forces had set up linked camps over a distance of more than 700 li, he told his subjects:

"(Liu) Bei does not know military strategy. How can anyone fight a war with camps laid out over a distance of 700 li? 'A person who deploys troops in forested and damp areas with obstacles is bound to be captured by the enemy.' This is something to be avoided in war. I will hear from Sun Quan very soon."

He received a report about the Wu victory seven days later.

== Aftermath ==
Huang Quan and the separate Shu army on the northern bank of the Yangtze were cut off from the main Shu army during the Wu counterattack and could not return to Shu. In desperation, Huang Quan and his subordinate Pang Lin led their troops to defect to Wei.

Small rebellions broke out in Lingling (零陵) and Guiyang (桂陽) commanderies after the Shu forces retreated. Bu Zhi, who was stationed at Yiyang before the battle, led Wu forces to suppress them.

After the battle, Xu Sheng, Pan Zhang, Song Qian and other Wu officers suggested attacking Baidicheng to capture Liu Bei. When Sun Quan asked Lu Xun for his opinion, Lu Xun, Zhu Ran and Luo Tong said that when Cao Pi amassed his forces and seemed like he was going to help Wu attack Shu, he actually had sinister intentions. They cautioned Sun Quan about this and suggested to abandon their pursuit of Liu Bei and return to Wu. Sun Quan heeded their advice. Not long later, Cao Pi led the Wei armies to invade Wu from three directions.

When Liu Bei heard of the Wei invasion of Wu, he wrote to Lu Xun:

"The enemy (Wei) is at Jiangling now. If I launch another attack again, in your opinion, do you think I will succeed?"

Lu Xun replied:

"I am afraid your army has recently suffered defeats and has yet to recover. Now is the time for you to make reconciliations, rest and recuperate. This is not the time for you to launch another assault on us again. However, if you do not consider carefully and plan to dispatch all your remaining forces on another attack, I assure you none of those you send here will return alive."

Liu Bei became critically ill in April 223. Before he died on 10 June, he named his son Liu Shan as his successor and appointed Zhuge Liang and Li Yan as regents to assist Liu Shan. After taking over the reins of power, Zhuge Liang made peace with Wu and re-established the Wu–Shu alliance against Wei.

== Order of battle ==
=== Wu forces ===
- Grand Chief Controller (大都督) Lu Xun
- General of Illustrious Martial Might (昭武將軍) Zhu Ran
- General Who Inspires Might (振威將軍) Pan Zhang
- Lieutenant General (偏將軍) Han Dang
- General Who Builds Martial Might (建武將軍) Xu Sheng
- General of the Household Who Pacifies the East (安東中郎將) Sun Huan
- General of the Household Who Builds Loyalty (建忠中郎將) Luo Tong
- Song Qian
- Xianyu Dan (鮮于丹)
- Li Yi (李異)
- Liu E (劉阿)
- Jiang Yi

==== Non-participants ====
- King of Wu (吳王) Sun Quan
- General Who Pacifies the Rong (平戎將軍) Bu Zhi

=== Shu forces ===
==== Main army ====
- Emperor of Shu Han (蜀漢皇帝) Liu Bei
- † Grand Controller (大督) Feng Xi
- † Vanguard (前部) Zhang Nan
- Detachment Commander (別督) Fu Kuang
- Detachment Commander (別督) Zhao Rong (趙融)
- Detachment Commander (別督) Liao Hua
- † Detachment Commander (別督) Fu Rong
- † Palace Attendant Ma Liang
- General of the Standard (牙門將) Xiang Chong (向寵)
- Aide-de-camp (別駕從事) Li Chao
- † Assistant Officer and Libationer (從事祭酒) Cheng Ji
- Wu Ban
- Chen Shi
- † Wang Fu
- (surrendered) Du Lu (杜路)
- (surrendered) Liu Ning (劉寧)

==== North army ====
- General Who Guards the North (鎮北將軍) Huang Quan
- Assistant Officer in Headquarters Office (治中從事) Pang Lin

==== Allies ====
- † Shamoke

==== Non-participants ====
- General of the Assisting Army (翊軍將軍) Zhao Yun

== In Romance of the Three Kingdoms ==
The events before, during, and after the Battle of Xiaoting are mentioned in chapters 81–84 of the 14th-century historical novel Romance of the Three Kingdoms (Sanguo Yanyi) by Luo Guanzhong. Some fictitious stories were included and actual events were exaggerated for dramatic effect. The following are some notable events related to the battle, as described in the novel:

=== Opposition to Liu Bei's decision to go to war ===
Liu Bei plans to go to war with Sun Quan to avenge Guan Yu and retake Jing Province, but his decision is opposed by many of his subjects. The first person who attempts to dissuade him from going to war is Zhao Yun, who is ignored. After that, other Shu officials such as Ma Liang and Chen Zhen urge Zhuge Liang to stop Liu Bei, so Zhuge Liang brings them along to meet Liu Bei and advise him against his decision, but Liu Bei refuses to accept their advice. Just when Liu Bei is preparing for war, Qin Mi opposes his decision. Liu Bei is so angry that he wants to execute Qin Mi. However, Qin Mi is spared after Zhuge Liang and the rest of the Shu imperial court plead with Liu Bei. Zhuge Liang then writes a memorial to Liu Bei to explain why he should not go to war with Sun Quan, but Liu Bei throws the memorial to the ground after reading it and exclaims, "My decision is final. There is no need to advise me against my decision anymore!"

Historicity

The historical text Sanguozhi did not mention anything about Zhuge Liang opposing Liu Bei's decision to go to war with Sun Quan. However, it did mention that Zhao Yun and Qin Mi attempted to dissuade Liu Bei: Zhao Yun advised Liu Bei against attacking Sun Quan, but was ignored. Qin Mi was imprisoned by Liu Bei when he advised him against the campaign, but was released later.

=== Huang Zhong's death ===
The Shu general Huang Zhong participates in the campaign even though he is already over 70 years old at the time. He slays Pan Zhang's subordinate, Shi Ji (史蹟), and defeats Pan Zhang in an engagement on the first day. On the second day, while pursuing the retreating Pan Zhang, he falls into an ambush and is surrounded by Zhou Tai, Han Dang, Ling Tong and Pan Zhang. He is hit by an arrow fired by Ma Zhong (馬忠). Guan Xing and Zhang Bao save him, but he dies from his wound that night. Liu Bei mourns his death. The novel indicates that Huang Zhong died around the 1st month of the 2nd year of the Zhangwu era of Liu Bei's reign; the month corresponds to 30 January to 28 February 222 in the Julian calendar.

Historicity

Huang Zhong's biography in the Sanguozhi stated that Huang Zhong died in 220, a year after the Hanzhong Campaign ended. His cause of death is unknown.

=== Guan Xing killing Pan Zhang ===
In one of the early engagements, Guan Xing encounters Pan Zhang, whose deputy Ma Zhong (馬忠) captured his father Guan Yu in an ambush during the Battle of Maicheng. In his eagerness to avenge his father, Guan Xing pursues Pan Zhang into a valley but loses his way inside. After nightfall, Guan Xing wanders around until he finds a house inhabited by an old man and stays there for the night. He sees his father's portrait on the wall in the house. Later that night, Pan Zhang also finds his way to the house and asks to stay there. Guan Xing sees Pan Zhang and shouts at him. Just as Pan Zhang is about to leave, he encounters Guan Yu's ghost and is petrified. Guan Xing catches up with Pan Zhang, kills him, digs out his heart and places it on the altar as an offering to his father's spirit.

Historicity

Pan Zhang's biography in the Sanguozhi stated that he died in 234 – more than 10 years after the Battle of Xiaoting. His cause of death is unknown. Guan Yu's biography mentioned that Guan Xing served as a civil official in Shu after reaching adulthood (around the age of 19) and died a few years later while in office, so Guan Xing was most probably not involved in the battle.

=== Gan Ning's death ===
Gan Ning is down with dysentery around the time of the Battle of Xiaoting, but he still participates in the battle regardless of his illness. He is resting when he hears enemy forces approaching, so he quickly mounts his horse and prepares for battle. He encounters a group of tribal warriors led by Shamoke. He sees that the enemy force is too large and decides to withdraw. While retreating on horseback, Gan Ning is hit in the head by an arrow fired by Shamoke. He flees, with the arrow still embedded in his head, reaches Fuchi (富池; in present-day Yangxin County, Hubei), sits down under a tree and dies. Dozens of crows on the tree fly around his body. When Sun Quan learns of Gan Ning's death, he is deeply saddened and gives orders for Gan to be buried with full honours.

Historicity

No details were provided on Gan Ning's cause and time of death in his biography in the Sanguozhi. Gan Ning's death was briefly stated as follows: When Gan Ning died, Sun Quan deeply lamented his death.

=== Zhao Yun killing Zhu Ran ===
Liu Bei retreats under the protection of Guan Xing and Zhang Bao after his camps are set on fire by the Wu forces, who continue to pursue him. At a critical moment, Zhao Yun shows up and blocks the attacks from the enemy. Zhao Yun encounters Zhu Ran during the battle and kills him. He protects Liu Bei while the latter heads towards Baidicheng.

Historicity

The Zhao Yun Biezhuan stated that Zhao Yun did not participate in the Battle of Xiaoting. Before the battle, Zhao Yun advised Liu Bei against going to war with Sun Quan but was ignored. Liu Bei ordered him to remain behind and guard Jiangzhou. When Zhao Yun learnt that Liu Bei had been defeated at Zigui, he led troops from Jiangzhou to Yong'an to help his lord.

Zhu Ran's biography in the Sanguozhi stated that he died in 249 at the age of 68 (by East Asian age reckoning) – about 27 years after the Battle of Xiaoting. Besides, he outlived Zhao Yun, who historically died in 229.

=== Lady Sun's death ===
News of Liu Bei's defeat in the battle reached his ex-wife Lady Sun, who had returned to Wu. After hearing rumours that Liu Bei had been killed in battle, Lady Sun ventured out to the bank of the Yangtze, where she faced the west and wept before drowning herself.

Historicity

Nothing was recorded in history about what happened to Lady Sun after she left Liu Bei and returned to Wu territory.
