= Song Qian =

Song Qian may refer to:

- Song Qian (Eastern Wu) (宋謙), military general of Eastern Wu during the Three Kingdoms period of China
- Song Qian (宋茜, born 1987), also known as Victoria Song, Chinese singer and actress
