= Wang Fu =

Wang Fu may refer to:

- Wang Fu (Han dynasty) (王符, 78–163), Han dynasty philosopher
- Wang Fu (eunuch) (王甫, died 179), influential palace eunuch under Emperor Ling
- Wang Fu (Three Kingdoms) (王甫, died 222), official of Shu Han during the Three Kingdoms period
- Wang Fu (or Fou, zh:王浮), daoist of the early Jin dynasty, author of the Huahujing.
- Wang Fu (painter) (王紱, 1362–1416), Ming dynasty painter
