= Gu Li =

Gu Li is the name of:

- Gu Li (Han dynasty) (fl. 214–226), officer under the warlord Sun Quan during the Han and Eastern Wu dynasties
- Gu Li (Go player) (born 1983), Chinese Go player
- Gu Li, a major character in the Tiny Times (franchise)

== See also ==
- Gul (name), a common name among Turkic people in western China, where it's also transliterated as "Gu Li"
- Li Gu (disambiguation) – for people with the surname Li
- Guli (disambiguation)
