= Feng Xi =

General of the state of Shu Han (died 222)

- 馮習
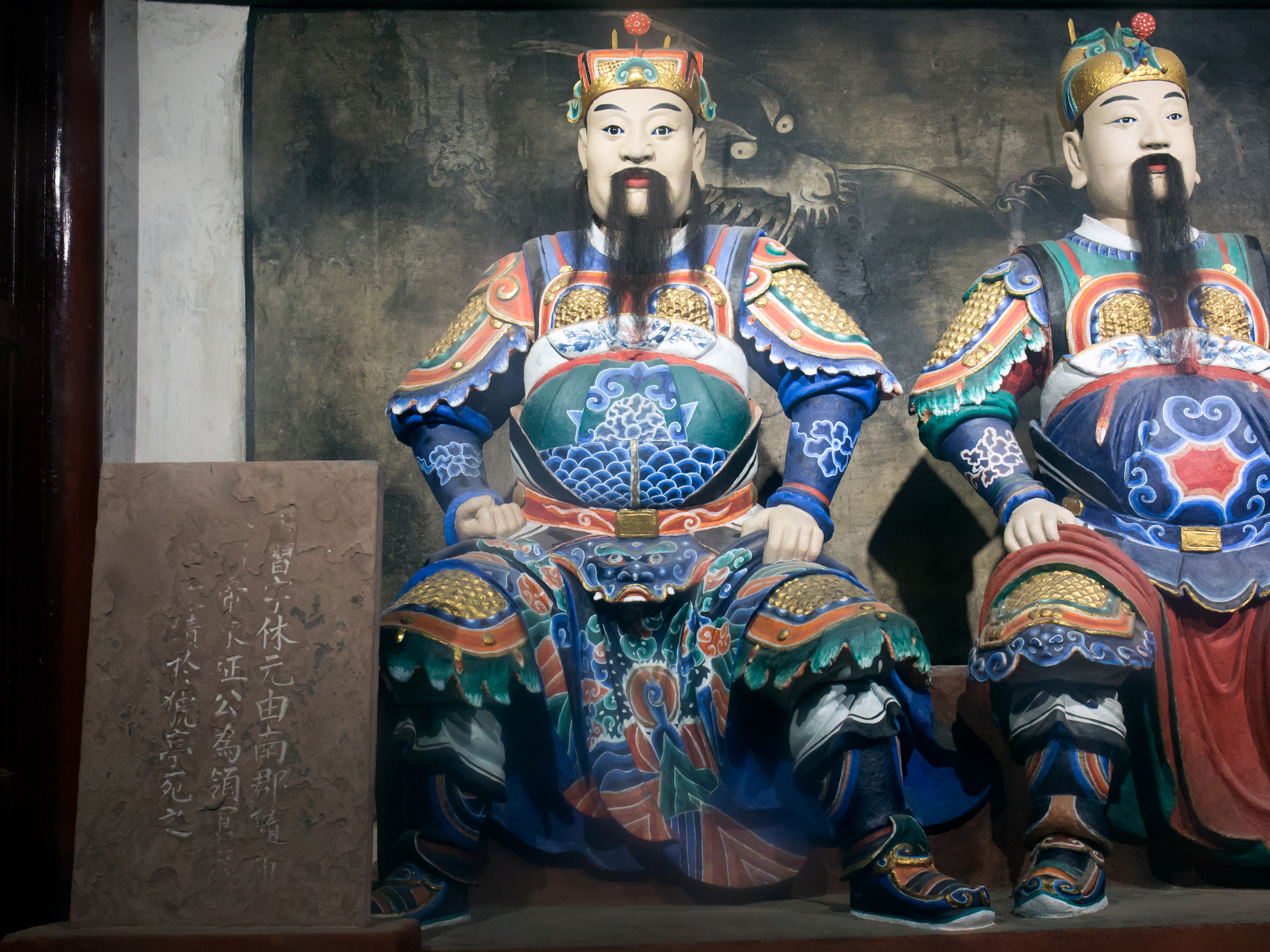
- Statue of Feng Xi in the Zhuge Liang Memorial Temple in Chengdu, Sichuan

Grand Viceroy (大督)
- In office 221 – 222
- Monarch: Liu Bei

Personal details
- Born: Unknown Jingzhou, Hubei
- Died: 222 Yidu County or Changyang County, Hubei
- Occupation: General
- Courtesy name: Xiuyuan (休元)

Feng Xi (died 222), courtesy name Xiuyuan, was a Chinese military general of the state of Shu Han in the Three Kingdoms period.

== Life ==
Feng Xi was from Nan Commandery (南郡), which is around present-day Jingzhou, Hubei. He served as a general under Liu Bei, the founding emperor of the state of Shu Han in the Three Kingdoms era.

In 221, Liu Bei attacked his former ally, Sun Quan (the founding emperor of Eastern Wu), after the latter broke their alliance and seized his territories in Jing Province and executed his general Guan Yu. Feng Xi participated in this campaign, which led to the Battle of Xiaoting (or Battle of Yiling) of 221–222. In the initial stages of the battle, Feng Xi and Wu Ban defeated Sun Quan's officers Li Yi (李異) and Liu E (劉阿) in the area near the Wu Gorge and pressed further towards Zigui County. Feng Xi was then appointed as the Grand Viceroy (大督) of the Shu army. In the summer of 222, Sun Quan's forces, led by Lu Xun, suddenly launched a counterattack after about six months of stalemate since the beginning of 222. Feng Xi was killed in battle by the subordinates of the Wu general Pan Zhang and his unit suffered heavy casualties.

== Appraisal ==
In his Ji Han Fuchen Zan, the Shu writer Yang Xi (楊戲) attributed Feng Xi's downfall to his overconfidence and underestimation of the enemy.

== See also ==
- Lists of people of the Three Kingdoms
