= Xu Sheng =

General serving warlord Sun Quan (died c.225)

- 徐盛

General Who Stabilises the East (安東將軍)
- In office 222 – c. 225
- Monarch: Sun Quan

General Who Builds Martial Might (建武將軍)
- In office ?–?

Administrator of Lujiang (廬江太守)
- In office ?–?

General of the Household (中郎將)
- In office ?–?

Prefect of Wuhu (蕪湖令)
- In office ?–?

Colonel (校尉)
- In office ?–?

Chief of Chaisang (柴桑長)
- In office ?–?

Personal details
- Born: Unknown; Ju County, Shandong
- Died: c.224–229 (Note: The Sanguozhi recorded that Xu Sheng died sometime during the Huangwu era (222-229) of Sun Quan's reign. However, Xu Sheng was recorded to be involved in the defence against Cao Pi's invasion in the 3rd year of the Huangwu era (224). Thus, Xu Sheng likely died after 224.)
- Children: Xu Kai
- Occupation: General
- Courtesy name: Wenxiang (文嚮)
- Peerage: Marquis of Wuhu (蕪湖侯)

Xu Sheng (died c.224–229), courtesy name Wenxiang, was a military general serving under the warlord Sun Quan in the late Eastern Han dynasty and early Three Kingdoms period of China.

== Early life and career ==
Xu Sheng was from Ju County (莒縣), Langya Commandery (琅邪郡), which is present-day Ju County, Shandong. When chaos broke out in central and northern China towards the end of the Eastern Han dynasty, Xu Sheng moved from his hometown to Wu Commandery (around present-day Suzhou, Jiangsu) in southern China, where he gained a reputation for his bravery. He was later recruited by the warlord Sun Quan, who controlled much of the territories in Jiangdong at the time. Sun Quan appointed Xu Sheng as a Major of Separate Command (別部司馬), placed him in command of 500 troops, and appointed him as the Chief of Chaisang (柴桑; around present-day Jiujiang, Jiangxi) to defend the county from attacks by Huang Zu, the Administrator of Jiangxia Commandery (江夏郡; around present-day Xinzhou District, Wuhan, Hubei).

Huang Zu once sent his son, Huang She (黃射), to lead a few thousand troops to attack Chaisang. At the time, Xu Sheng had less than 200 men with him, so they released arrows at Huang She's advancing forces and wounded over 1,000 enemy soldiers. Xu Sheng then ordered the city gates to be opened and they charged out and defeated the enemy. Huang She no longer posed a threat to Xu Sheng after that battle. Xu Sheng was promoted to Colonel (校尉) and appointed as the Prefect of Wuhu County. Later, he defeated some bandits in Nan'e (南阿) and Lincheng (臨城) counties. He was subsequently promoted to General of the Household (中郎將) and tasked with overseeing a regiment.

== Wars with Cao Cao and Liu Bei ==
In 213, when Sun Quan's rival Cao Cao led an army to attack Ruxu (濡須; north of present-day Wuwei County, Anhui), Xu Sheng followed Sun Quan to resist the enemy at the Battle of Ruxu. Cao Cao launched a heavy assault on Hengjiang (橫江; southeast of present-day He County, Anhui, on the northern shore of the Yangtze), so Xu Sheng and Sun Quan's other generals led their forces to defend that position. Strong winds blew their mengchongs (a type of warship) across the river towards Cao Cao's side. Sun Quan's generals were all terrified and did not dare to land on the enemy's grounds. However, Xu Sheng led his men to charge at the enemy and succeeded in killing a few and forcing the rest to retreat. When the winds stopped, Sun Quan's forces returned to their side. Sun Quan highly praised Xu Sheng for his courage.

Between 214 and 215, Sun Quan led his armies to attack Hefei, a strategic fortress defended by Cao Cao's general Zhang Liao, leading to the Battle of Xiaoyao Ford. During an early skirmish, when Sun Quan's forces were just setting up their camps outside Hefei, Zhang Liao suddenly led hundreds of troops on a fierce assault, completely catching the enemy off guard. Xu Sheng's unit was routed and his men turned around and fled. Pan Zhang, another officer under Sun Quan, executed two deserters – one from Xu Sheng's unit and the other from Song Qian's. Xu Sheng had no choice but to gather his remaining men and return to battle. He lost his mao (矛; a type of long spear) in the earlier clash but He Qi found his weapon later on the battlefield. A plague eventually forced Sun Quan to withdraw his forces from Hefei. As they were retreating, Zhang Liao and his troops launched a sudden counterattack and inflicted a crushing defeat on the enemy at Xiaoyao Ford.

Xu Sheng was promoted to General Who Builds Martial Might (建武將軍), enfeoffed as a Marquis of a Chief Village (都亭侯), appointed as the Administrator of Lujiang Commandery (廬江郡), and given Lincheng County (臨城縣) as his marquisate. Between 221 and 222, when the Battle of Xiaoting broke out between Sun Quan and Liu Bei, Xu Sheng participated in the war and succeeded in capturing many enemy camps when Sun Quan's forces launched a counterattack after enduring defeats in earlier engagements.

== War with Wei, and death ==
In late 222, Cao Pi ordered his general Cao Xiu to lead the Wei armies to attack Dongkou County. In response to the invasion, Xu Sheng, along with Lü Fan and Quan Cong led Sun Quan's forces across the river to defend Dongkou. However, they encountered a storm and many of their troops and ships were lost. Sun Quan's generals were browbeaten because they had lost about half of their ships in the storm, but were overjoyed when they heard of the arrival of He Qi, who reached Dongkou behind schedule and was not affected by the disaster. Coincidentally, He Qi was obsessed with luxuries so his ships were finely decorated and his weapons were of top quality. Cao Xiu was shocked when he witnessed the grandeur display of He Qi's refulgent navy so he paused the attack and withdrew. Xu Sheng managed to gather his surviving troops and form a defence line along the shore. A naval battle ensued, during which Cao Xiu targeted Lü Fan while sending his subordinates to attack Xu Sheng. Xu Sheng was outnumbered but he managed to hold his position. Both sides eventually withdrew their forces. Xu Sheng was subsequently promoted to General Who Stabilises the East (安東將軍) and elevated from the status of a village marquis to a county marquis under the title "Marquis of Wuhu" (蕪湖侯).

In late 224, when Cao Pi mobilised a large army to attack Sun Quan, Xu Sheng suggested to pitch encampments from Jianye, erect fake towers within each camp, and suspend some warships on the river. Sun Quan's other generals disagreed and felt that such "defences" would serve no purpose, but Xu Sheng ignored them and proceeded with his plan.

Xu Sheng's ruse effectively led to the construction of a "wall" along the river banks that served as a border stretching over hundreds of li. When Cao Pi reached Guangling Commandery (廣陵郡; covering parts of present-day Jiangsu), he saw Sun Quan's "strong defences" and the high tide and sighed, "Wei has thousands of armed cavalry units but they can't be deployed here". He then withdrew his forces. Sun Quan's generals finally recognised the value of Xu Sheng's plan.

Xu Sheng died sometime during the Huangwu era (222-229) of Sun Quan's reign before Sun Quan declared himself emperor and established the state of Eastern Wu. His militia and marquis title were inherited by his son, Xu Kai (徐楷).

== Appraisal ==
Xu Sheng was known for his confidence and fervent loyalty towards Sun Quan, as demonstrated in the incident when Xing Zhen (邢貞) came to confer the title "King of Wu" (吳王) on Sun Quan. In 220, Sun Quan became a vassal of the state of Cao Wei, which replaced the Han dynasty after the Wei founder, Cao Pi, forced Emperor Xian to abdicate the throne to him. Cao Pi sent Xing Zhen as an emissary to meet Sun Quan and confer the title "King of Wu" (吳王) on him. Xing Zhen behaved arrogantly in front of Sun Quan and incurred much anger from Sun Quan's subjects, including Zhang Zhao and Xu Sheng. Xu Sheng told his colleagues: "Isn't it humiliating to watch our lord submit to Xing Zhen and not be able to serve him with our lives and help him conquer Xu, Luoyang and Bashu?" Tears rolled down his face. When Xing Zhen heard Xu Sheng's remark, he told an aide: "It's obvious from the reactions of the subjects of Jiangdong that they won't remain subservient for long." Xing Zhen was right, because in 222, Sun Quan declared independence from Wei but continued ruling his domain under the title "King of Wu" before declaring himself emperor in 229.

Xu Sheng's ego did not always lead to positive actions though. After the Battle of Ruxu in 217, Zhou Tai was appointed as the commander of the garrison at Ruxu, with Xu Sheng and Zhu Ran as his subordinates. However, both of them were unwilling to submit to Zhou Tai's command, citing the latter's humble origins in comparison to their more affluent family backgrounds. When Sun Quan heard about it, he visited Ruxu and hosted a party for all the officers there, during which he asked Zhou Tai to display his battle scars for all to see. He later awarded Zhou Tai with an imperial parasol. After that incident, Xu Sheng and Zhu Ran agreed to submit to Zhou Tai's command.

Xu Sheng was also known for his tendency to worry too much. When he was serving as the Prefect of Wuhu County, he arrested one of Jiang Qin's subordinates and sought permission from Sun Quan to have that man executed. However, Sun Quan declined because Jiang Qin was away battling bandits in Yuzhang Commandery (豫章郡). Since then, Xu Sheng had been apprehensive of Jiang Qin. During the Battle of Ruxu in 217, Jiang Qin and Lü Meng were placed in charge of military discipline among Sun Quan's forces. Xu Sheng was worried that Jiang Qin might use the opportunity to find fault with him, but much to his surprise, Jiang Qin praised him in front of Sun Quan. When Sun Quan asked Jiang Qin why he did so, Jiang Qin replied that Xu Sheng was "loyal and hardworking, possessed both courage and talent, and was capable of leading thousands of troops".

== See also ==
- Lists of people of the Three Kingdoms
