= Shamoke =

Tribal Chieftain of Three Kingdoms era China, allied with Shu Han (died 222)

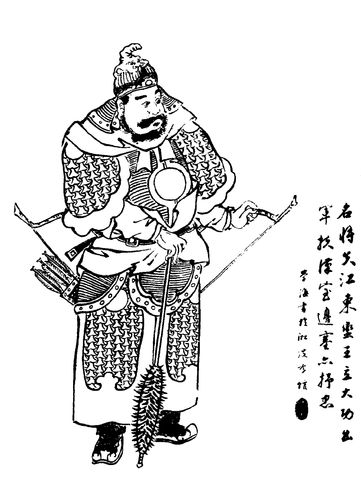
- A Qing dynasty illustration of Shamoke
- Traditional Chinese: 沙摩柯
- Simplified Chinese: 沙摩柯
Transcriptions
Standard Mandarin
- Hanyu Pinyin: Shāmókē

Shamoke (died 222) was a Wuximan (五溪蠻) tribe chieftain in Wuling County (武陵郡; around present-day Changde, Hunan) during the late Eastern Han dynasty and Three Kingdoms period of China. He allied with the Shu Han during the Battle of Xiaoting of 221–222 against the Eastern Wu and was killed in battle.

== Life ==
Shamoke was a chieftain among the native tribes living in the Five Creeks (五溪蠻, literally the Barbarians of Five Creeks) of Wuling County (武陵郡; around present-day Changde, Hunan). In 221, Liu Bei, the emperor of the Shu Han state, started the Battle of Xiaoting against his ally-turned-rival Sun Quan, the ruler of the Eastern Wu state. He sent an official, Ma Liang, as an envoy to meet Shamoke and the tribal chiefs Five Creeks tribes and managed to bribe them with wealth and titles to gain their support in the war against Sun Quan. Shamoke was killed in battle in 222 when Sun Quan's forces launched a counterattack against Liu Bei's forces and dealt them a devastating defeat.

== In Romance of the Three Kingdoms ==
Shamoke appears as a minor character in the 14th-century historical novel Romance of the Three Kingdoms, which romanticises the events before and during the Three Kingdoms period. His physical appearance is described as follows in the novel:

His face was spotted with red as if splashed with blood that is split from the mouth, and his eyes were blue and big. He rushed among [the] troops, mighty and fierce, wielding two spiked iron maces with long poles, with two bows slung at his belt.

During the Battle of Xiaoting, he encounters the Eastern Wu general Gan Ning, who insists on participating in the battle even though he is ill at the time. When Gan Ning realises that he cannot fight Shamoke due to his condition, he tries to retreat but is fatally shot in the head with an arrow by Shamoke. Later on, when Shamoke gets caught up in the Eastern Wu forces' fire attack against the Shu Han forces, he attempts to flee the battlefield but the Eastern Wu general Zhou Tai catches up with him and kills him after a brief fight.

== See also ==
- Lists of people of the Three Kingdoms
