= Lucheng Subdistrict, Yidu =

Lucheng Subdistrict 陆城街道
- Subdistrict
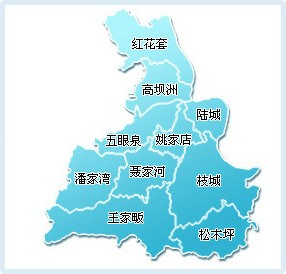
- Location in Yidu City

- Location in Hubei
- Coordinates: 30°23′15″N 111°27′07″E
- Country: People's Republic of China
- Province: Hubei
- Prefecture-level city: Yichang
- County-level city: Yidu
- Village-level divisions: 10 residential communities 9 villages
- Elevation: 59 m (194 ft)

Population (2010)
  - Total: 90,849
- Time zone: UTC+8 (China Standard)
- Postal code: 443300
- Area code: 0717

Lucheng Subdistrict (simplified Chinese: 陆城街道; traditional Chinese: 陸城街道; pinyin: Lùchéng Jiēdào) is a subdistrict and the seat of Yidu, Hubei, People's Republic of China, located at the intersection of the Qing and Yangtze Rivers. It is named after the Eastern Wu (Three Kingdoms) general Lu Xun who led a resistance against the state of Shu in this area.

== Administrative Divisions ==
As of 2011, Lucheng Subdistrict had eight residential communities (居委会) and nine villages under its administration. As of 2018, the subdistrict has ten residential communities and nine villages.

Ten residential communities:

- Dongfeng (东风社区), Shengli (胜利社区), Qingjiang (清江社区), Mingdu (名都社区), Jiefang (解放社区), Hongchun (红春社区), Zhongbi (中笔社区), Toubi (头笔社区), Baziqiao (八字桥社区), Jinjiang (锦江社区)

Nine villages:

- Liangjianao (亮家垴村), Taibaohu (太宝湖村), Yimachong (驿马冲村), Chejiadian (车家店村), Weibi (尾笔村), Shilipu (十里铺村), Sanjiang (三江村), Baotawan (宝塔湾村), Longwo (龙窝村)

== See also ==
- List of township-level divisions of Hubei
