= Pan Zhang =

Chinese general serving warlord Sun Quan (died 234)

- 潘璋

General of the Right (右將軍)
- In office 223 – 234
- Monarch: Sun Quan

General Who Pacifies the North (平北將軍)
- In office 222 – 223
- Monarch: Sun Quan

Administrator of Xiangyang (襄陽太守)
- In office 222 – 223
- Monarch: Sun Quan

General Who Inspires Might (振威將軍)
- In office 219 – 222

Administrator of Guling (固陵太守)
- In office 219 – 222

Personal details
- Born: Unknown Guan County, Shandong
- Died: 234 (Note: Pan Zhang's biography in the Sanguozhi stated that he died in the third year of the Jia'he era (232–238) of Sun Quan's reign.)
- Children: Pan Ping
- Occupation: General
- Courtesy name: Wengui (文珪)
- Peerage: Marquis of Liyang (溧陽侯)

Pan Zhang (died 234), courtesy name Wengui, was a military general serving under the warlord Sun Quan during the late Eastern Han dynasty of China. He continued serving in the state of Eastern Wu (founded by Sun Quan) during the Three Kingdoms period until his death. Pan Zhang was praised by Chen Shou as one of the "twelve tiger ministers of Jiangdong" (江東十二虎臣).

== Early life and career ==
Pan Zhang was from Fagan County (發干縣), Dong Commandery (東郡), which is located east of present-day Guan County, Shandong. In 196, he became a follower of a 14-year-old Sun Quan, who was then serving as the Chief (長) of Yangxian County (陽羨縣) under his elder brother Sun Ce, who controlled many territories in the Jiangdong region. Pan Zhang was a heavy drinker and compulsive gambler, and he had to frequently borrow money to support these habits because his family was poor. When his creditors came to pursue debts, he always claimed that he would pay them back when he became wealthy. Sun Quan felt that Pan Zhang was extraordinary and favoured him, so he sent Pan on a recruitment drive. Pan Zhang returned with more than 100 men and Sun Quan appointed him as a military officer. He became a Major of Separate Command (別部司馬)

After defeating some bandits, he was appointed as a da shi cijian (大巿刺姧; similar to a police chief) in Wu Commandery (Note: around present-day Suzhou, Jiangsu) and became famous after achieving success in maintaining high standards of security in the area, as bandit activity ceased. He was reassigned to be the Chief (長) of Xi'an County (西安縣; present-day Wuning County, Jiangxi) later.

In 200, raiding and banditry by Huang Zu's forces disappeared after Pan Zhang went on an extermination campaign. Around the time, bandits were rampant in Jing Province (Note: covering present-day Hubei and Hunan) and its governor Liu Biao was unable to deal with them. However, the bandits did not dare to cross the border into Yuzhang Commandery to pillage the area when they heard that Pan Zhang was stationed there. When an uprising broke out in Jianchang County (建昌縣; west of present-day Fengxin County, Jiangxi), Pan Zhang was reassigned to be the county chief and appointed as Colonel of Martial Vehemence (武猛校尉) and then sent to suppress the revolt and succeeded in doing so within a month and managed to gather back 800 soldiers who were scattered during the rebellion. He was summoned to Jianye, the capital of Sun Quan's domain.

== Battle of Xiaoyao Ford ==
In 214, Sun Quan led an army to attack Hefei, a city defended by Cao Cao's general Zhang Liao, leading to the Battle of Xiaoyao Ford. Lü Meng and Ling Tong took three commanderies by strategy and led their men with Sun Jiao and Pan Zhang to support Lu Su at Yiyang. When Sun Quan's forces were just setting up their camps outside Hefei, Zhang Liao suddenly led hundreds of troops to attack them, completely catching the enemy off guard. Chen Wu was killed in action while Song Qian and Xu Sheng were defeated and their men dispersed. Pan Zhang chased the deserting soldiers on horseback and executed two of them, forcing the others to return to battle. Sun Quan's forces managed to hold up against Zhang Liao's assault that day despite sustaining heavy casualties, but eventually suffered a crushing defeat when Zhang Liao launched a surprise counterattack while they were withdrawing. Sun Quan was impressed when he heard of Pan Zhang's actions and he promoted Pan to Lieutenant-General (偏將軍), put him in charge of more troops. and ordered him to garrison at Banzhou (半州).

== Campaigns against Liu Bei ==
In 219, Pan Zhang participated in a campaign led by Sun Quan's general Lü Meng to seize control of Jing Province from Guan Yu, a general under Liu Bei. Pan Zhang and Zhu Ran blocked Guan Yu's retreat routes and stationed at Jiashi (夾石) when they reached Linju County (臨沮縣; present-day Yuan'an County, Hubei). Guan Yu, along with his son Guan Ping and subordinate Zhao Lei (趙累), were captured alive in an ambush laid by Ma Zhong (馬忠), a Major (司馬) under Pan Zhang (Guan Yu, Guan Ping and Zhao Lei would later be executed in Linju County). In recognition of Pan Zhang's contributions, Sun Quan split Yidu and Zigui counties to form Guling Commandery (固陵郡) and appointed Pan as the Administrator (太守) of the commandery. The appointment of Guling commandery were due to Lü Meng suggestion to Sun Quan. Sun Quan also further promoting him to General Who Inspires Might (振威將軍) and enfeoffing him as the Marquis of Liyang (溧陽侯). After the death of Gan Ning, his units were transferred to Pan Zhang command. This includes Ding Feng, future famous general who at that time served as minor unit commander who at his youth served Gan Ning.

In late 221, Liu Bei launched a campaign against Sun Quan to retake Jing Province, leading to the Battle of Xiaoting of 221–222. Pan Zhang participated in the battle under the leadership of Lu Xun, the frontline commander of Sun Quan's forces. After enduring some initial defeats and months of stalemate, Lu Xun eventually ordered a large-scale counterattack with the use of fire, inflicting a crushing defeat on Liu Bei's forces. During the attack, Pan Zhang's subordinates killed Feng Xi. Pan Zhang himself has killed many Shu soldiers. For his achievements during this campaign, Pan Zhang were further promoted to General Who Pacifies the North (平北將軍) and appointed as the Administrator of Xiangyang Commandery.

== Campaigns against Wei ==
In Pan Zhang's later years, he was tasked with defending Sun Quan's territories from invasions by the state of Cao Wei, which was founded by Cao Cao's son and successor, Cao Pi.

In late October 222, Cao Pi ordered Cao Xiu, Zhang Liao and Zang Ba to attack Dongkou (洞口); Cao Ren to attack Ruxu (濡須); and Cao Zhen, Xiahou Shang, Zhang He and Xu Huang to besiege Nan Commandery (南郡). In response, Sun Quan put Lü Fan in command of five armies to resist Cao Xiu; Zhuge Jin, Pan Zhang and Yang Can (楊粲) were dispatched to relieve the siege on Nan Commandery which was being defended by Zhu Ran while Zhu Huan defended the fortress of Ruxu from Cao Ren. However, At that time, many soldiers in the city were sick, and those who could fight easily slaughtered by Wei army. Nevertheless, Zhu Ran managed to defend the city and the Wei siege lifted.

In 223, Cao Pi launch another offensive by sending Zhang He, Xu Huang, Cao Zhen, Xiahou Shang and others to lead armies to attack Nan Commandery (南郡) with the objective of capturing the commandery capital Jiangling County, which was defended by Zhu Ran. Xiahou Shang sent 30,000 troops to build pontoon bridges for crossing over the Yangtze River to Bailizhou (百里洲), an island stretching over 100 li in the river around that area. Zhuge Jin and Yang Can (楊粲) wanted to lead their men to defend the island but were unable to locate the Wei troops' crossing points. Pan Zhang told them, "The Wei army's morale is very high at the beginning and the tide is low, so we shouldn't fight them yet." They moved to about 50 li upstream, where Pan Zhang ordered his men to collect thousands of bundles of reeds, attach them onto some large rafts, and set them on fire. The flaming rafts were then allowed to sail downstream and they destroyed the enemy's pontoon bridges. Xiahou Shang sensed that he was in danger of being isolated so he withdrew his forces from the island before his retreat route could be sealed. Pan Zhang moved to Lukou (陸口; at Lushui Lake near present-day Chibi, Hubei) and stationed there. Sun Quan praised Pan Zhang for his efforts and promoted him to General of the Right (右將軍).

Later, in 227, Pan Zhang followed Sun Quan to a battle against Wei forces at Shiyang County (石陽縣; in present-day Hanchuan, Hubei). During the battle, Wen Ping was surrounded by Sun Quan's 50,000 strong army. Wen Ping firmly defended his position with a smaller army for about 20 days. As Sun Quan decided to retreat, Pan Zhang was tasked with covering the rear as Sun Quan's men were withdrawing after the battle. However, Wen Ping suddenly launched a counterattack as the Wu forces retreated, and Pan Zhang, who lowered his guard that night, could not hold up against the enemy when they attacked. Zhu Ran led reinforcements to resist the enemy's advance until Sun Quan's forces at the front had completely retreated before he withdrew.

In 233, Sun Quan ordered Pan Zhang and Lü Dai to lead their troops to station at Lukou (陸口; at Lushui Lake near present-day Chibi, Hubei). Later, he instructed them to relocate their garrison to the nearby Puqi (蒲圻; present-day Chibi, Hubei).

== Death ==
Pan Zhang died in 234, and his troops were relocated to be placed under command of Lü Dai. His cause of death was not recorded in history. His son, Pan Ping (潘平), was exiled to Kuaiji Commandery for poor behaviour. Pan Zhang's wife remained in Jianye and received land and 50 taxable households.

== Appraisal ==
For his courage, Chen Shou named Pan Zhang as one of the "twelve tigers of Jiangdong" (江東十二虎臣). This evaluation was emulated by Southern Song dynasty scholar Zhang Ruyu, who wrote that these twelve were among the best generals and commanders of the Wu kingdom.

The appraisal of courage and strength of Pan Zhang also given by Lu Ji.

However, Pan Zhang was known to be rude and violent. He liked to brag about his achievements and even though the number of men he commanded was of several thousands, he acted as if their numbers reached ten thousand; his prohibitions were severe and Chen Shou commented that every time after a battle, Pan Zhang would set up a market for the distribution of military equipment. Other units would replenish their stocks by taking from him. He led an extravagant lifestyle, even more in his later years. The quality of his personal items and clothing actually exceeded that befitting his rank and status. He also killed wealthy officials or soldiers among his own troops and seized their property for himself and had broken the law on several occasions. When others reported these incidents to Sun Quan, he did not pursue the matter in consideration of Pan Zhang's contributions. Hao Jing, a Confucian scholar of the Yuan dynasty, asserted his evaluation that Pan Zhang's lawlessness was tolerated due to his powerful service to Sun Quan.

== In fiction ==
Pan Zhang appeared as a character in the historical novel Romance of the Three Kingdoms by Luo Guanzhong, which romanticises the historical events before and during the Three Kingdoms period. In the novel, Pan Zhang was credited as the person responsible for capturing Guan Yu and Guan Ping an ambush during the Wu invasion of Jing Province in 219. He obtained Guan Yu's weapon, the Green Dragon Crescent Blade, as a spoil of war. He was killed by Guan Xing in around 221 during one of the early engagements in the Battle of Xiaoting. See Battle of Xiaoting#Guan Xing killing Pan Zhang for details.

== See also ==
- Lists of people of the Three Kingdoms

== Appendix ==
=== Bibliography ===
- Chen, Shou (3rd century). Records of the Three Kingdoms (Sanguozhi).
- de Crespigny, Rafe (2007). A Biographical Dictionary of Later Han to the Three Kingdoms 23-220 AD. Leiden: Brill. ISBN 9789004156050.
- Page:Gujin Tushu Jicheng, Volume 353 (1700-1725).djvu/35. zh – via Wikisource.
