= He Qi =

General serving warlords Sun Ce and Sun Quan (died 227)

- 賀齊

Governor of Xu Province (徐州牧) (nominal)
- In office 223 – 227
- Monarch: Sun Quan

General of the Rear (後將軍)
- In office 223 – 227
- Monarch: Sun Quan

General Who Stabilises the East (安東將軍)
- In office 216 – 223

General of Uplifting Martial Might (奮武將軍)
- In office 213 – 216

Lieutenant-General (偏將軍)
- In office ?–?

Administrator of Xindu (新都太守)
- In office ?–?

General of the Household of Military Might (威武中郎將)
- In office 208 – ?

Colonel Who Pacifies the East (平東校尉)
- In office 205 – 208

Commandant of the South District (南部都尉)
- In office 196 – 205
- Preceded by: Han Yan

Personal details
- Born: Unknown Shaoxing, Zhejiang
- Died: 227 (Note: He Qi's biography in the Sanguozhi recorded that he died four years after capturing the Wei general Jin Zong. According to the Zizhi Tongjian, Jin Zong was captured in 223. Therefore, He Qi died in the year 227.)
- Relations: see He family of Kuaiji
- Children: He Da; He Jing
- Parent: He Fu (father)
- Occupation: General
- Courtesy name: Gongmiao (公苗)
- Peerage: Marquis of Shanyin (山陰侯)

He Qi (died 227), courtesy name Gongmiao, was a military general serving under the warlords Sun Ce and Sun Quan during the late Eastern Han dynasty, and later in the state of Eastern Wu during the early Three Kingdoms period of China. He was especially noted for his extravagance and preference for equipping his troops with flashy weapons, armour and well-decorated ships. At the same time, he was also adept in dealing with the Shanyue tribes in Sun Quan's territories, having quelled several local uprisings by them over the years. His achievements secured the stability of the inner lands of Jiangdong and provided a strong foundation for the development of the Eastern Wu state. His campaigns in southern China also set a precedent for other generals serving under Sun Quan, such as Bu Zhi and Lü Dai. In his later years, He Qi participated in some battles against Wu's rival state, Wei, during which he seldom scored a victory.

== Early life and career ==
He Qi was from Shanyin County (山陰縣), Kuaiji Commandery (會稽郡), which is around present-day Shaoxing, Zhejiang. His family name was originally "Qing" (慶), but his ancestors changed it to "He" (賀) to avoid naming taboo because "Qing" was the personal name of Liu Qing, the father of Liu Hu (Emperor An) (r. 106–125), the sixth emperor of the Eastern Han dynasty. His father, He Fu (賀輔), served as the Chief (長) of Yongning County (永寧縣), while his uncle, He Chun (賀純), served as the Administrator (太守) of Jiangxia Commandery (江夏郡) during the reign of Emperor An.

He Qi started his career in the 190s as a military officer in Yan County (剡縣), one of the counties in Kuaiji Commandery, which was then administered by the minor warlord Wang Lang. During his tenure, he suppressed several small-scale uprisings by the local tribes in the area. Around 196, when the warlord Sun Ce attacked the territories in the Jiangdong region, Wang Lang fled from Kuaiji Commandery. He Qi then came to serve under Sun Ce, who nominated him as a xiaolian (civil service candidate).

He Qi became a deputy to Han Yan (韓晏), the Commandant of the South District (南部都尉) under Sun Ce. Sun Ce then tasked Han Yan with pursuing Wang Lang, who had fled to Dongye County (東冶縣) and later to Houguan County (侯官縣). Shang Sheng (商升), the Chief of Houguan County, led the military forces in his county to support Wang Lang in resisting Sun Ce.

== Subjugating southern counties ==
After Han Yan was killed in battle against Shang Sheng's forces, He Qi succeeded him and continued the mission of capturing Houguan County. Fearing He Qi's reputation, Shang Sheng surrendered, but one of his subordinates Zhang Ya (張雅) disagreed with him, killed him and took control of Houguan County. He Qi knew that Zhang Ya could not be easily defeated so he halted the attack and waited for an opportunity to strike. When Zhang Ya got into a quarrel with his son-in-law, He Qi sent spies into Houguan County to stir up greater conflict between them and seized the chance to attack Houguan County and defeat Zhang Ya and force his men to surrender. Even after Houguan County had been pacified, at the time there were numerous hostile forces in the southern counties which were unwilling to submit to Sun Ce's rule, such as the Shanyue tribes. He Qi decided to continue on a campaign against these hostile forces and force them to surrender.

When Sun Ce ordered the local leaders in the southern counties under his control to recruit 5,000 soldiers for He Qi, one of them refused to comply because he despised He Qi, who came from a lesser social background. After He Qi executed that leader for defying the order, the other leaders quickly complied. Within two years, He Qi had defeated most of the hostile forces and killed some 6,000 enemies in the battles.

After Sun Ce's death in 200, He Qi continued serving under Sun Quan, Sun Ce's younger brother and successor, who became the new warlord ruling over the territories in the Jiangdong region. By 205, He Qi had reestablished control over the southern counties and conscripted 10,000 men. During this time, he suggested to Sun Quan to split parts of Shangrao County (上饒縣) to form a new county, Jianping County (建平縣). Sun Quan agreed and appointed He Qi as Colonel Who Pacifies the East (平東校尉).

== Fighting the Shanyue ==
In 208, Sun Quan appointed He Qi as General of the Household of Military Might (威武中郎將) and ordered him to deal with the Shanyue rebels in Danyang Commandery (丹陽郡). As He Qi and his troops advanced towards Yi and She counties, four villages along the way surrendered to him. The Baopuzi by Ge Hong mentioned a story, which said that the Shanyue attempted to use magic to stop He Qi. Their magic could make metal weapons useless and direct arrows back to the archers who fired them. Upon hearing this rumour, He Qi allegedly said, "I know that there are ways to block a sharp metal blade and that there are antidotes to counter snake venom. However, if we don't use metal blades and snake venom, then these countermeasures will have no effect." He then ordered his soldiers to arm themselves with wooden clubs against the enemies and defeated them.

After pacifying the Shanyue revolts, He Qi suggested to Sun Quan to reform the administrative districts in Danyang Commandery. Sun Quan then converted one village into a county, split Yi and She counties into smaller counties, and grouped several of them to form a new commandery, Xindu Commandery (新都郡). He then appointed He Qi as the Administrator (太守) of Xindu Commandery and promoted him to Lieutenant-General (偏將軍).

In 211, one Lang Zhi (郎稚) from Yuhang County (餘杭縣) succeeded in convincing a few thousand peasants to join the Shanyue tribes in rebelling against Sun Quan's rule. After He Qi suppressed the revolt, he advised Sun Quan to split Yuhang County into two counties. Sun Quan agreed. In 213, when some 10,000 people in Yuzhang Commandery (豫章郡) started a rebellion, He Qi quelled the revolt again and executed the rebel leaders. He then selected the strongest among the surrendered rebels to serve as soldiers and registered the others as citizens of Yuzhang Commandery. In recognition of He Qi's efforts, Sun Quan promoted him to General of Uplifting Martial Might (奮武將軍)

== Later life ==
As He Qi gained greater fame from his successful subjugation of restless local tribes in the Jiangdong region, he started participating in some battles against Sun Quan's rival, Cao Cao, the warlord who controlled the central government of the Eastern Han dynasty in its final years. In 215, He Qi fought in the Battle of Xiaoyao Ford when Sun Quan led his forces to attack the heavily fortified Hefei, which was defended by Cao Cao's general Zhang Liao and others. Sun Quan's forces suffered a devastating defeat at the hands of Zhang Liao and his colleagues in the battle and barely managed to retreat alive. During the battle, one of Sun Quan's officers, Xu Sheng, apparently lost his long spear in the midst of the fighting. He Qi found Xu Sheng's spear by coincidence and returned it to him.

In 216, Cao Cao granted You Tu, a local leader in Poyang Commandery (鄱陽郡), the seal of authority and instigated him to start a rebellion. Three counties in Poyang Commandery responded to You Tu's call. In response, Sun Quan ordered He Qi and Lu Xun to suppress the rebellion, which they did and killed several thousands of rebels. After that, He Qi remained at the border along the Yangtze River between Sun Quan and Cao Cao's territories to guard against any enemy invasion.

After the end of the Eastern Han dynasty in 220, He Qi continued serving under Sun Quan, who became an autonomous ruler of his Eastern Wu regime in southern China. On the other hand, Cao Cao's son, Cao Pi, usurped the throne from the last Han emperor and established the Cao Wei state in northern China. Between 222 and 223, the Wu and Wei forces clashed at the Battle of Dongkou. The Wei forces led by Cao Xiu defeated the Wu navy led by Lü Fan which had just experienced a natural disaster and lost several ships. Just when the Wu forces were worried about Cao Xiu's impending attack, Wu reinforcements led by He Qi showed up at Dongkou. Since He Qi arrived behind schedule, his fleet was not affected by the storm which destroyed many of Lü Fan's ships. At the same time, as He Qi had a penchant for extravagance, his ships were all finely decorated and his troops were equipped with the best weapons. Cao Xiu was shocked when he saw He Qi's grandeur display of his refulgent fleet. Believing that the Wu fleet was more powerful, Cao Xiu ordered the Wei forces to retreat, thus sparing Lü Fan and his remaining forces from almost certain doom. When Sun Quan heard about this incident, he promoted He Qi to the position of General of the Rear (後將軍).

In June 223, Jin Zong (晋宗), a Wu military officer, defected to Wei and seized control of Qichun County (蕲春縣) through a mutiny. Sun Quan ordered He Qi and Hu Zong (胡綜) to lead troops, with Mi Fang, Xianyu Dan (鮮于丹) and Liu Shao (劉邵) as their subordinates, to attack Jin Zong and retake Qichun County. However, they decided to retreat due to the scorching weather and after failing to take Qichun County. At the time, Jin Zong lowered his guard, so the Wu forces seized the opportunity to launch a surprise attack. In the ensuing battle, He Qi captured Jin Zong alive and retook Qichun County. He died of illness in 227.

== Family ==
He Qi had at least two sons: He Da (賀達) and He Jing (賀景).

In 233, when Sun Quan wanted to form an alliance with the Liaodong warlord Gongsun Yuan against Wei, he sent He Da as his representative to meet Gongsun Yuan. However, Gongsun Yuan later betrayed him and executed He Da. He Da's son, He Zhi (賀質), served as a Tiger's Teeth General (虎牙將軍) in Wu.

He Jing served as a Colonel Who Destroys Bandits (滅賊校尉) in Wu. He had two sons: He Shao (賀邵; 227 - 275) (Note: He Shao has his own biography in Volume 65 of the Records of the Three Kingdoms.) and He Hui (賀惠). He Shao rose to prominence in the later years of Wu before it was conquered by the Jin dynasty in 280. He Shao's son, He Xun (賀循; 260 - 28 August 319), (Note: He Xun has his own biography in Volume 68 of the Book of Jin.) became a famous Confucian scholar during the Jin dynasty. He Hui served as the Prefect (令) of Wanling County (宛陵縣) in Wu.

== See also ==
- Lists of people of the Three Kingdoms
