= AD 154 =

154 in various calendars
- Gregorian calendar: 154; CLIV
- Ab urbe condita: 907
- Assyrian calendar: 4904
- Balinese saka calendar: 75–76
- Bengali calendar: −440 – −439
- Berber calendar: 1104
- Buddhist calendar: 698
- Burmese calendar: −484
- Byzantine calendar: 5662–5663
- Chinese calendar: 癸巳年 (Water Snake); 2851 or 2644 — to — 甲午年 (Wood Horse); 2852 or 2645
- Coptic calendar: −130 – −129
- Discordian calendar: 1320
- Ethiopian calendar: 146–147
- Hebrew calendar: 3914–3915
- Hindu calendars
- Vikram Samvat: 210–211
- Shaka Samvat: 75–76
- Kali Yuga: 3254–3255
- Holocene calendar: 10154
- Iranian calendar: 468 BP – 467 BP
- Islamic calendar: 482 BH – 481 BH
- Javanese calendar: 29–31
- Julian calendar: 154; CLIV
- Korean calendar: 2487
- Minguo calendar: 1758 before ROC 民前1758年
- Nanakshahi calendar: −1314
- Seleucid era: 465/466 AG
- Thai solar calendar: 696–697
- Tibetan calendar: ཆུ་མོ་སྦྲུལ་ལོ་ (female Water-Snake); 280 or −101 or −873 — to — ཤིང་ཕོ་རྟ་ལོ་ (male Wood-Horse); 281 or −100 or −872

Year 154 (CLIV) was a common year starting on Monday of the Julian calendar. At the time, it was known as the Year of the Consulship of Aurelius and Lateranus (or, less frequently, year 907 Ab urbe condita). The denomination 154 for this year has been used since the early medieval period, when the Anno Domini calendar era became the prevalent method in Europe for naming years.

== Events ==
=== By place ===
==== Roman Empire ====
- King Eupator of Bosphorus pays tribute to Rome, due to the threat posed by the Alani.
- The Antonine Wall is completed.

==== Asia ====
- Last (2nd) year of Yongxing era of the Chinese Han dynasty.
- Adalla becomes ruler of the Korean kingdom of Silla.

=== By topic ===
==== Religion ====
- Anicetus becomes pope of Rome (approximate date).
- Anicetus meets with Polycarp of Smyrna to discuss the Computus, the date of Easter in the Christian liturgical calendar.
- Change of Patriarch of Constantinople from Patriarch Euzois to Patriarch Laurence.

== Births ==
- July 11 – Bardaisan, Syriac gnostic (d. 222)

== Deaths ==
- Euzois, bishop of Byzantium
- Ilseong, Korean ruler of Silla
- Pius I, pope of Rome (approximate date)
