= Battle of Xiaoyao Ford =

Battle between warlords Cao Cao and Sun Quan (214-215)

- Part of the wars at the end of the Han dynasty
Date	214–215
Location	East of Hefei, Anhui, China 31°51′50″N 117°16′51″E
Result	Cao Cao victory; Sun Quan retreat

Belligerents
Cao Cao	Sun Quan

Commanders and leaders
Zhang Liao; Li Dian; Yue Jin	Sun Quan; Gan Ning; Ling Tong (WIA); Lü Meng; Chen Wu †; Jiang Qin; Xu Sheng (WIA); Pan Zhang; Song Qian

Strength
7,000 soldiers inside Hefei fortress	~100,000, 1,000 bodyguards under Sun Quan, 300 men under Ling Tong

Casualties and losses
700+	1,300+
- Location within China

Battle of Xiaoyao Ford
- Traditional Chinese: 逍遙津之戰
- Simplified Chinese: 逍遥津之战
- Literal meaning: Battle of Leisure Ford
Transcriptions
Standard Mandarin
- Hanyu Pinyin: Xiāoyáojīn Zhī Zhàn

Battle of Hefei
- Traditional Chinese: 合肥之戰
- Simplified Chinese: 合肥之战
Transcriptions
Standard Mandarin
- Hanyu Pinyin: Héféi Zhī Zhàn

The Battle of Xiaoyao Ford, also known as the Battle of Leisure Ford, Battle of Hefei, and Hefei Campaign, was fought between the warlords Cao Cao and Sun Quan between 214 and 215 in the late Eastern Han dynasty. The two contending sides were fighting for control over a strategic fortress at Hefei, which was defended by Cao Cao's general Zhang Liao. Towards the end of the campaign, Zhang Liao made use of force concentration and launched a sneak counteroffensive on Sun Quan at Leisure Ford, where Sun only had 1,000 soldiers with him at the time. Amidst the chaos, Sun Quan barely escaped capture with the aid of his general Ling Tong. This action raised Zhang Liao to primacy among Cao Cao's generals.

== Background ==
Long before Sun Quan solidified his control over southeastern China, Cao Cao had appointed Liu Fu as the Inspector of Yang Province, and had him build fortifications against besiegers. Liu Fu oversaw the construction of Hefei fortress (合肥城), stocked with boulders, logs, and reserves of fish oil.

In late 208 after the Battle of Red Cliffs, Sun Quan led an army to invade Hefei but was unsuccessful despite several months of progress. The following year, the local powers and two former subordinates of Yuan Shu and Liu Fu, Chen Lan (陳蘭) and Mei Cheng (梅成), rebelled in Lujiang (盧江) after the death of Liu Fu (whom they trusted), but the revolt was suppressed by Cao Cao's generals Zhang Liao and Zang Ba. Cao Cao then ordered Zhang Liao, Yue Jin and Li Dian to lead 7,000 troops to enter Hefei fortress. Chen Lan's ally, Lei Bo (雷薄), surrendered to another warlord Liu Bei.

In 213 Cao Cao brought with him a 400,000 strong army to attack Sun Quan's 70,000 men at Ruxukou (濡須口), but victory eluded him for more than a month, and he was forced on the defensive. After his repeated failures against the southerners, Cao Cao was worried that the various counties along the Yangtze River would be taken by Sun Quan, so he adopted a Fabian strategy and started to form military communities, families of soldiers concentrated in fortified towns. The Yangtze region became depopulated as residents were relocated except for Wan County (皖縣; present-day Qianshan County, Anhui), which was situated south of Hefei. Cao Cao appointed Zhu Guang (朱光) as Administrator of Lujiang and garrisoned him at Wan County, promoting agriculture and bribing wealthy locals in Poyang (鄱陽) to spy on Sun Quan's forces and harass the enemy's rear.

== The campaign ==
=== Battle of Wan County ===
Around June or July 214, Sun Quan took advantage of heavy rains and floods in the Huai River region to sail up the Yangtze and attack Wan County (皖縣), which served as a billet and storehouse for Zhang Liao's and Xiahou Dun's armies. Sun Quan faced two options: to build siege engines, or attack right away with foot soldiers. Lü Meng suggested the latter option and recommended Gan Ning to lead the offensive. Upon knowing Sun Quan had arrived on the battlefield, Zhang Liao moved out of Hefei fortress to reinforce Wan County. However, Sun Quan's energetic troops took Wan County within a day, and Zhu Guang was captured along with his advisor Dong He (董和). By the time Zhang Liao reached Jiashi (夾石), he received news of the fall of Wan County and withdrew to Hefei.

Around this time, Liu Bei had taken over Yi Province (covering present-day Sichuan and Chongqing) from Liu Zhang, so Sun Quan sent Zhuge Jin to demand from Liu Bei the return of Jing Province. Liu Bei refused, and Guan Yu also drove away the officials Sun Quan sent to three commanderies in southern Jing Province. Sun Quan then withdrew his elite generals from the northern frontier and ordered Lü Meng and Ling Tong to lead 20,000 troops to take the three commanderies of Jing Province, while sending Lu Su to lead 10,000 men to garrison at Baqiu (巴丘) to resist Guan Yu, while he personally stationed at Lukou (陸口) to serve as backup. Liu Bei also led his army to Gong'an (公安) and sent Guan Yu with 30,000 men to Yiyang (益陽). Lü Meng and Ling Tong took three commanderies by strategy and led their men with Sun Jiao and Pan Zhang to support Lu Su at Yiyang. Taking advantage of the Liu-Sun conflict, Cao Cao led an army to attack Zhang Lu of Hanzhong. Liu Bei was afraid that if Hanzhong fell to Cao Cao, Yi Province would be in peril as Hanzhong was the "gateway" to Yi Province. Hence, Liu Bei made peace with Sun Quan by dividing southern Jing Province. In return, Sun Quan promised to divert Cao Cao's attention from the west by attacking Hefei fortress.

=== An unorthodox order ===
Before Cao Cao left to attack Zhang Lu, he left his representative Xue Ti (薛悌) with a letter that read "Open when the enemy arrives" on the envelope. As Sun Quan's army was already advancing towards Hefei, the defending generals opened the letter, which stated: "When Sun Quan arrives, generals Zhang (Liao) and Li (Dian) will engage him; General Yue (Jin) will remain behind to defend and not go into battle." The generals were uncertain about the orders but Zhang Liao said, "Our lord is away at war. By the time his reinforcements reach here, we're already done for. So he is actually instructing us to take advantage of the situation, when the enemy has just arrived and not fully gathered yet, to attack them and devastate their morale so as to calm our men and strengthen our defences. Victory or defeat, it all depends on this battle. Why are the two of you still hesitating?" Li Dian was moved and he said, "This is a national crisis. We'll see how your strategy works out. How can I let my personal affairs take precedence over my official duties?" Zhang Liao then selected 800 "die-hard" soldiers overnight in preparation for the upcoming battle, and threw a banquet for his men.

=== Battle around the fortress ===
The following morning, Zhang Liao led the 800 soldiers, as did Li Dian, on a raid. Zhang Liao personally killed tens of enemy soldiers and two officers, breaking through the barricades and shouting his name. In the chaos Chen Wu was killed, Xu Sheng and Song Qian's were put to flight, with Xu Sheng injured until and Pan Zhang killed two of the fleeing men to rally them. During the battle He Qi retrieved Xu Sheng's personal mao (矛, a 5m long spear).

As Zhang Liao arrived at Sun Quan's standard, Sun Quan retreated at the high ground, defending himself with lance and Zhang Liao shouted for Sun Quan to come down and fight him, but Sun did not dare to move. When Sun Quan saw how few men Zhang Liao had and ordered his troops to surround the raiding force but Zhang Liao fought fiercely and succeeded in breaking out of the encirclement. When his remaining men, still trapped inside, shouted, "Has our general abandoned us?" Zhang Liao ploughed back through enemy ranks and rescued his men. Sun Quan's men were stunned by Zhang Liao's valour and did not dare to stand in his way.

After the engagement, Pan Zhang was promoted to the rank of Lieutenant General for his role in rallying the troops but the long morning's battle had crushed the morale of Sun Quan's troops. Zhang Liao brought his survivors back to the city and fortified his defences. Zhang Liao's victory boosted his men's fighting spirits and reassured the defenders.

When Sun Quan's forces had all gathered, they launched an assault on the city. However, Hefei's defenses, prepared by Liu Fu, were not easy to breach. After several days, Sun Quan was still unable to take the city with a plague having hit the army, Sun Quan decided to withdraw.

=== Battle at Xiaoyao Ford ===
Sun Quan decided to personally oversee the rearguard, numbering only about 1,000 and were the last to move. Zhang Liao launched an attack, when Sun Quan had the fewest troops with Sun Quan's rearguard cut off from the rest of the army at Xiaoyao Ford when he, Li Dian, and Yue Jin led all their forces out of Hefei for an all-out assault.

When Sun Quan saw that the advancing attack, he realised his danger and hurriedly recalled his retreating units, but they could not return in time. As the 1,000 men of Sun Quan were engulfed by Zhang Liao's force, Ling Tong and his personal companions of 300 men cut a way out for Sun Quan. As Sun Quan's side was in confusion and battle signals were not given, Gan Ning drummed the other units to action, while he personally shot arrows at the enemy.

Sun Quan hurried to the southern shore until he reached the crossing at Xiaoyao Ford, but the bridge had been destroyed, leaving a nearly 10 metre-long gap. Gu Li, Sun Quan's bodyguard, told his master to sit tight, grab the reins firmly. Gu Li whipped the horse's flanks, and it made a mighty leap across to the southern side. Ling Tong turned back to hold off the enemy after seeing Sun Quan to safety.

On the northern shore, Ling Tong gave all for his lord's cause, fighting until all his 300 men had died and the other units had retreated while he himself was badly wounded having killed tens of men. Knowing Sun Quan was safety away by this time, Ling Tong found the bridge was broken and the roads blocked so, despite being armoured, waded through the water to safety.

By that time, Sun Quan had already boarded a boat and been secured by He Qi's arrival with three thousand men, and he was pleased to see Ling Tong again but Ling Tong wept at the death of all his close aides. Sun Quan comforted him, saying, "Gongji (Ling Tong's courtesy name), let the dead go. As long as you live, why worry that you'll have no men under you?" Sun Quan later put Ling Tong in command of twice his previous force while He Qi rebuked Sun Quan for his recklessness in the battle.

== Aftermath ==
During a banquet hosted by Sun Quan after the battle, He Qi wept and said, "My lord, as a leader of men, you should be prudent. Today we were almost wiped out and the men are in shock. I hope you will learn from this lesson." Sun Quan thanked He Qi for his advice and promised to remember it for life.

When the battle was over, Zhang Liao asked a captive soldier, "Who was that purple-bearded, long-bodied, short-legged man so skilled in mounted archery?" The soldier replied it was Sun Quan. Zhang Liao then told Yue Jin that he regretted not chasing after this purple-bearded fighter, for he could have caught him.

When the news reached Cao Cao, he could hardly believe what his officers had achieved, so he later travelled to Xiaoyao Ford to scrutinize the battlefield. Zhang Liao was promoted to the rank of "General Conqueror of the East". Li Dian was granted 100 more households, for a total of 300. Yue Jin received 500 more taxable households, for a total of 1,200. Five hundred households were allotted to Yue Jin's son, who had also fought. Yue Jin's son also received the title of marquis, while the father was promoted to "General of the Right".

On Sun Quan's side, Ling Tong and Pan Zhang were promoted to "Lieutenant General" while Jiang Qin was appointed "General Vanquisher of Bandits". Sun Quan also attended Chen Wu's funeral and ordered Chen's favourite concubine to join him in death.

== In popular culture ==
The battle is featured as a playable stage in Koei's video game series Dynasty Warriors. In the games, the battle is known as both the "Battle of He Fei" and the "Battle of Hefei" (depending on the installment), and is not to be confused with another stage (Battle of Hefei Castle), which refers to the Battle of Hefei (234).
