= Li Gu =

Li Gu may refer to:

- Li Gu (Han dynasty) (李固; 93–147), courtesy name Zijian (子堅), Eastern Han dynasty scholar and official
- Li Gu (Later Zhou) (李穀; 903–960), Later Zhou dynasty chancellor
- Li Gu (李固), fictional character in the novel Water Margin, Lu Junyi's housekeeper who betrayed his master

== See also ==
- Gu Li (disambiguation) for people surnamed Gu
