= Song Qian (Eastern Wu) =

Eastern Han general serving under warlords Sun Ce and Sun Quan

Song Qian 宋謙
- Born: Unknown
- Died: Unknown
- Occupation: Military officer

Song Qian (fl. 190s–220s) was a military officer serving under the warlords Sun Ce and Sun Quan during the late Eastern Han dynasty and early Three Kingdoms period of China.

== Life ==
Information about Song Qian's life is sparse and scattered throughout the various biographies of notable persons in the Records of the Three Kingdoms, the authoritative source for the history of the late Eastern Han dynasty and Three Kingdoms period. For example, his origins (e.g. birthplace, ancestral home), courtesy name, ranks and appointments held, etc., were not recorded in history.

Song Qian started his career under the warlord Sun Ce around 195, shortly after the latter defeated a rival warlord Liu Yao during his conquests in the Jiangdong region. After Sun Ce's death in 200, he continued serving under Sun Ce's younger brother and successor, Sun Quan.

Between 214 and 215, Song Qian fought on Sun Quan's side in the Battle of Xiaoyao Ford against the forces of a rival warlord, Cao Cao. During one of the early skirmishes, the units led by Song Qian and Xu Sheng were routed by troops led by Cao Cao's general Zhang Liao. As they were fleeing, Pan Zhang, another officer under Sun Quan, chased and executed two deserting soldiers and forced the others to return to battle. Nevertheless, Sun Quan and his army suffered a devastating defeat at Xiaoyao Ford and barely managed to escape alive.

Song Qian fought in the Battle of Xiaoting/Yiling of 221–222 under the command of Lu Xun, a general under Sun Quan, against the forces of Sun Quan's ally-turned-rival Liu Bei. During the battle, he attacked and destroyed five enemy camps and killed their commanding officers. When Liu Bei retreated to Baidicheng after his defeat at the Battle of Xiaoting, Song Qian suggested that they press on and attack Baidicheng to capture Liu Bei. However, Lu Xun did not approve because he foresaw that Sun Quan's other rival, Cao Pi, might take advantage of the situation to invade Sun Quan's territories. It is not known what happened to Song Qian after the Battle of Xiaoting.

== In Romance of the Three Kingdoms ==
The 14th-century historical novel Romance of the Three Kingdoms is a romanticisation of the events before and during the Three Kingdoms period of China. In the novel, Song Qian was slain by Li Dian, a general under the warlord Cao Cao, during the Battle of Xiaoyao Ford of 214–215.

== See also ==
- Lists of people of the Three Kingdoms
