= Yao Zhou =

Shu Han official (died 242)

- 姚伷

Deputy Director of the Secretariat (尚書僕射)
- In office 234 – 242
- Monarch: Liu Shan

Senior Clerk in the Office of the Imperial Chancellor (掾)
- In office 227 – 234
- Monarch: Liu Shan
- Chancellor: Zhuge Liang

Administrator of Guanghan (廣漢太守)
- In office 223 – 227
- Monarch: Liu Shan
- Chancellor: Zhuge Liang

Assistant Scribe (書佐) (under Liu Bei)
- In office 214 – ?
- Monarch: Emperor Xian of Han

Personal details
- Born: Unknown; Langzhong, Sichuan
- Died: 242; Chengdu, Sichuan
- Occupation: Official
- Courtesy name: Zixu (子緒)

Yao Zhou (died 242), courtesy name Zixu, was an official of the state of Shu Han during the Three Kingdoms period of China.

== Life ==
Yao Zhou was born in Langzhong (閬中), Baxi Commandery (巴西郡), which is present-day Langzhong, Sichuan. In July 214, after Liu Bei seized control over Yi Province, Yao Zhou served as an Officer of Merit (功曹) and Assistant Scribe (書佐). He was transferred to Ba Commandery along with another scholar Gong Lu. Both were famous and popular with high rank and salary yet they admired Zhang Ni whose status was lower than them due to his accomplishments and became friends with him.

Following Liu Bei's death in June 223, he was appointed as Administrator of Guanghan (廣漢太守). In 227, Zhuge Liang was stationed at Hanzhong and recalled Yao Zhou to serve as Senior Clerk (掾) in his office. While simultaneously, being responsible for the management of civil and military personals.

Zhuge Liang praised him and said: "There is nothing more important and useful than managing people well, allowing those individual to reach their respective office and bring benefice. At this moment, Clerk Yao is at the same time firm yet gentle. He certainly can be assessed as elegant in his handling and supervision of civil and military personals. In the past, auxiliaries wanted for the affairs to be managed as such, today their hopes are fulfilled."

He served as a military officer during Zhuge Liang's Northern Expeditions. After Zhuge Liang's death, he was appointed as deputy director of the Secretariat (尚書僕射). People at the time admired him for his honesty, sincerity and virtue. He died in 242. Thereafter his death, his work was eulogized.

== See also ==
- Lists of people of the Three Kingdoms
