= Cheng Ji (Shu Han) =

Chinese Shu Han military officer (died 222)

- 程畿
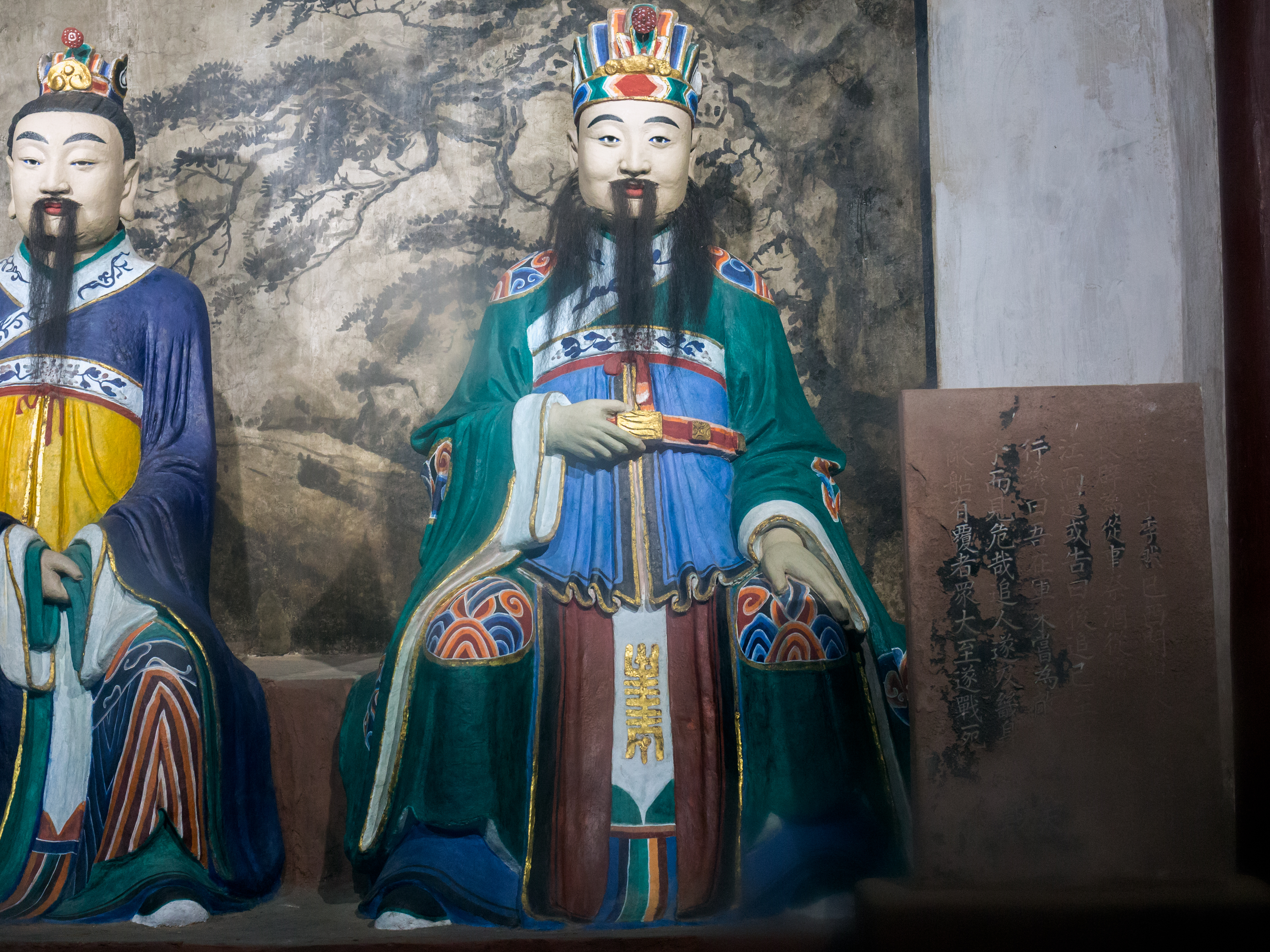
- Statue of Cheng Ji in the Zhuge Liang Memorial Temple in Chengdu, Sichuan

Personal details
- Born: Unknown Langzhong, Sichuan
- Died: 222 Yidu County or Changyang County, Hubei
- Children: Cheng Yu; Cheng Qi
- Occupation: Military officer
- Courtesy name: Jiran (季然)

Cheng Ji (died 222), courtesy name Jiran, was a Chinese military officer of the state of Shu Han during the Three Kingdoms period of China. He previously served under the warlord Liu Zhang during the late Eastern Han dynasty.

== Service under Liu Zhang ==
Cheng Ji was from Langzhong County (閬中縣), Baxi Commandery (巴西郡), which is in present-day Langzhong, Sichuan. He served as the Chief of Hanchang County (漢昌縣; in present-day Bazhong, Sichuan) under the warlord Liu Zhang, who controlled Yi Province (covering present-day Sichuan and Chongqing) during the late Eastern Han dynasty. An ethnic minority group, the Cong (賨), lived in Hanchang County. They were known for being fierce and warlike; Emperor Gao, the founding emperor of the Han dynasty, recruited Cong warriors to serve in his army when he conquered the Three Qins in 206–205 BCE. Cheng Ji's immediate superior was Pang Xi, the Administrator of Baxi Commandery, because Hanchang County was under Baxi Commandery's jurisdiction, and Baxi Commandery was administered by Yi Province.

As chaos broke out throughout China towards the end of the Eastern Han dynasty, Pang Xi wanted to improve security within Baxi Commandery, so he recruited more men to serve as soldiers. Around the time, Liu Zhang heard rumours that Pang Xi was planning to rebel against him and became more suspicious of Pang Xi. When Pang Xi heard about it, he became fearful and started making preparations to increase the strength of his military forces. He also sent Cheng Yu (程郁), Cheng Ji's son, who was serving in the commandery office, to persuade Cheng Ji to support him in rebelling against Liu Zhang. Cheng Ji wrote to Pang Xi: "Your original intention in recruiting more soldiers was not to start a rebellion. There might have been some misunderstanding, but what is more important is you are performing your duties. If you are fearful and start thinking of rebelling, I will not listen to you." He also wrote to Cheng Yu: "I received grace from the provincial government, so I am obliged to do my best to serve the Governor. You are serving in the commandery office, so you should do your best to serve the Administrator. You should not be thinking of rebelling."

Pang Xi sent a message to Cheng Ji: "Your son is serving in the commandery office. Your family will be in trouble if you do not obey the Administrator!" Cheng Ji replied: "Yue Yang (樂羊) ate his son's flesh not because he did not love his son, but because he was doing so for the sake of upholding righteousness. If you were to make me do the same thing, I will do it." Pang Xi realised that Cheng Ji would never support him, so he abandoned the idea of rebelling against Liu Zhang; instead, he apologised to Liu Zhang and was pardoned. When Liu Zhang heard about Cheng Ji's loyalty towards him, he promoted Cheng Ji to serve as the Administrator of Jiangyang Commandery (江陽郡; around present-day Luzhou, Sichuan).

== Service under Liu Bei ==
Cheng Ji came to serve under the warlord Liu Bei in around 215 after Liu Bei seized control of Yi Province from Liu Zhang. Liu Bei appointed him as an Assistant Officer and Libationer (從事祭酒).

In 221, Liu Bei declared himself emperor and established the state of Shu Han. In the same year, he launched a military campaign against the warlord Sun Quan, his former ally, and started the Battle of Xiaoting. After about six months of stalemate since the beginning of 222, Sun Quan's forces, led by Lu Xun, suddenly launched a counterattack, burnt down several Shu camps in a fire attack, and forced the remaining Shu forces to retreat. Cheng Ji remained behind to cover the retreat. As the enemy approached, someone urged him to abandon his boat and escape, but he replied: "I have never fled from battle throughout my career. Besides, the Emperor is currently in a dangerous situation." When the enemy showed up, Cheng Ji wielded a ji, fought fiercely and managed to sink some enemy boats before he was eventually overwhelmed by the enemy and killed.

== Family ==
Apart from Cheng Yu (程郁), Cheng Ji had another son, Cheng Qi (程祁), whose courtesy name was Gonghong (公弘). Cheng Qi was noted for his brilliance, but he died at the age of 19.

== Appraisal ==
In his Ji Han Fuchen Zan, the Shu official Yang Xi praised Cheng Ji for displaying steadfast loyalty and exemplary courage during the Battle of Xiaoting.

== See also ==
- Lists of people of the Three Kingdoms
