= Gu Li (Han dynasty) =

Close Attendant (親近監)
- In office ?–?

Personal details
- Born: Unknown
- Died: Unknown

Gu Li
- Chinese: 谷利
Transcriptions
Standard Mandarin
- Hanyu Pinyin: Gǔ Lì
- Wade–Giles: Ku Li

Gu Li (fl. 214–226) was a close aide of Sun Quan, a Chinese warlord of the late Eastern Han dynasty who later became the founding emperor of the state of Eastern Wu during the Three Kingdoms period.

== Life ==
Gu Li was initially a servant under Sun Quan. Sun Quan liked him for his attentive and forthright personality and promoted him to the position of Close Attendant (親近監). Gu Li was loyal, daring, and direct in speech, so Sun Quan trusted him even more and regarded him as a close aide.

In 215, during the Battle of Xiaoyao Ford, when Sun Quan was caught up in a fierce counterattack led by the enemy general Zhang Liao, he managed to break out of the encirclement and headed towards the ford. However, the bridge linking the north and south ends of the ford had been destroyed by Zhang Liao's men, leaving a gap more than one zhang wide. Gu Li came behind Sun Quan's horse, instructed his lord to sit tight and grab the reins firmly, then gave the horse a few whips to drive it forward. Sun Quan's horse successfully leapt across the broken bridge and brought its rider to safety. For his effort, Gu Li was later awarded the title of a Marquis of a Chief Village (都亭侯) by Sun Quan.

Around 226, Sun Quan had a large vessel constructed in Wuchang and he named the ship "Chang'an" (長安). He sailed on it towards Diaotaiyi (釣臺沂) but encountered a storm along the way. Gu Li then ordered the crew to head towards Fankou (樊口; northwest of present-day Echeng District, Ezhou, Hubei). Sun Quan said, "We should go to Luozhou (羅州; present-day Huazhou, Guangdong)." However, Gu Li brandished his sword at the crew and threatened, "I'll execute any person who does not go to Fankou." Upon reaching the port at Fankou, the storm had not subsided yet so they remained there. Sun Quan then asked Gu Li, "Were you afraid of the river?" Gu Li knelt down and said, "Your Majesty is the master of thousands. You should not venture into treacherous waters and brave the storm. The ship may be large and steady, but if you encounter danger, what will happen to the state? That was why I strongly objected (to sailing towards Luozhou)." When Sun Quan heard that, he respected Gu Li even more and started calling Gu by his surname since then.

== See also ==
- Lists of people of the Three Kingdoms
