= Guli, Bangladesh =

Coordinates: 22°42′30″N 90°41′15″E

Guli is a village in Dhania Union of Bhola Sadar Upazila, Bhola District, Barisal Division, Bangladesh.
