= Sun Huan (Shuwu) =

3rd century state of Eastern Wu general

- 孫桓

General Who Establishes Martial Might (建武將軍)
- In office 223 – 224?
- Monarch: Sun Quan

Personal details
- Born: 197/198
- Died: 224?
- Relations: See Eastern Wu family trees
- Parent: Sun He (father)
- Occupation: General
- Courtesy name: Shuwu (叔武)
- Peerage: Marquis of Dantu (丹徒侯)
- Other name: Yu Huan (俞桓)

Sun Huan (197/198 - 224?), birth name Yu Huan, courtesy name Shuwu, was a military general of the state of Eastern Wu during the Three Kingdoms period. He was a distant relative of Sun Quan, the founding emperor of Wu.

== Life ==
Sun Huan was the third son of Sun He (孫河), whose original family name was "Yu" (俞). Sun He was a distant nephew of the warlord Sun Jian, who changed Sun He's family name from "Yu" to "Sun". Sun Huan was known for his good looks, sociable personality, and for being well read and skilled in debating. He was held in high regard by Sun Quan, Sun Jian's second son and the founding emperor of Eastern Wu. Sun Quan appointed Sun Huan as a Commandant of Military Guards (武衞都尉). In 219, Sun Huan participated in an invasion of the territories of Liu Bei (Sun Quan's former ally) in Jing Province, which were defended by the general Guan Yu. Sun Quan's forces emerged victorious in the campaign. Sun Huan successfully induced about 5,000 of Guan Yu's soldiers into surrendering to him, and obtained much of the enemy's equipment and livestock.

Around 222, at the age of 24, Sun Huan was commissioned as General of the Household Who Pacifies the East (安東中郎將) and ordered to join Sun Quan's general Lu Xun at the Battle of Xiaoting against Liu Bei, who launched a campaign against Sun Quan to retake Jing Province. During the preliminary stages of the battle, Sun Huan led a separate force to attack Liu Bei's vanguard force at Yidao (夷道) but ended up being besieged by the enemy. He requested for reinforcements from Lu Xun but was denied. When the other officers urged Lu Xun to help Sun Huan, Lu declined, saying that Sun Huan was capable of holding his ground and that the siege would automatically be lifted later. Sun Quan's forces eventually inflicted a devastating defeat on Liu Bei's forces at the Battle of Xiaoting. As Lu Xun predicted, the siege on Yidao was lifted, after which Sun Huan led troops to block Liu Bei's retreat route, but Liu managed to escape by travelling across the mountainous areas. Liu Bei later remarked, "(Sun) Huan was still a child when I visited Jing, (Note: Jing (京), in present-day Zhenjiang, Jiangsu, was a county in Sun Quan's domain. Liu Bei visited Jing sometime in the early 210s to meet Sun Quan when they were still allies.) but now he is forcing me to this extent!" After the battle, Sun Huan came to see Lu Xun and he told the latter, "Earlier on, I was indeed very resentful when you refused to help me. But now, after the victory, I see that you have your own style of despatching the troops."

Sun Huan was promoted to General Who Establishes Martial Might (建武將軍) for his contributions in the battle and enfeoffed as the Marquis of Dantu (丹徒侯). He was ordered to garrison at Niuzhu (牛渚) and oversee the construction of a low wall at Hengjiang (橫江). He died shortly after.

== See also ==
- Lists of people of the Three Kingdoms
- Eastern Wu family trees#Sun He (Bohai)
