= Wang Fu (Three Kingdoms) =

Shu Han state official (died 222)

- 王甫

Assistant Officer in the Bureau of Deliberations (議曹從事)
- In office ? – 222
- Monarch: Liu Bei

Prefect of Mianzhu (綿竹令)
- In office 214 – ?

Assistant Scribe (書佐) (under Liu Zhang)
- In office ? – 214

Personal details
- Born: Unknown Santai County, Sichuan
- Died: 222 Zigui County, Hubei
- Relations: Wang Shi (cousin); Wang Shang (cousin)
- Children: Wang You
- Occupation: Official
- Courtesy name: Guoshan (國山)

Wang Fu (died 222), courtesy name Guoshan, was a Chinese general of the state of Shu Han during the Three Kingdoms period of China.

== Life ==
Wang Fu was from Qi County (郪縣), Guanghan Commandery (廣漢郡), which is in present-day Santai County, Sichuan. He started his career as an Assistant Scribe (書佐) under Liu Zhang, the Governor of Yi Province (covering present-day Sichuan and Chongqing).

In 214, after the warlord Liu Bei seized control of Yi Province from Liu Zhang, he appointed Wang Fu as the Prefect (令) of Mianzhu County (綿竹縣; southeast of present-day Mianzhu, Sichuan). Later, Wang Fu was reassigned to Jing Province to serve as an Assistant Officer in the Bureau of Deliberations (議曹從事).

In 222, Wang Fu accompanied Liu Bei on a campaign against his ally-turned-rival Sun Quan. After Liu Bei lost at the Battle of Xiaoting against Sun Quan's forces, Wang Fu covered Liu Bei while he retreated and was killed by enemy forces.

== In Romance of the Three Kingdoms ==
Wang Fu is a minor character in the 14th-century historical novel Romance of the Three Kingdoms, which romanticises the events before and during the Three Kingdoms period of China. In the novel, Wang Fu serves as a subordinate of Guan Yu, the general whom Liu Bei puts in charge of guarding Jing Province while he is away in Yi Province. Before Guan Yu leaves for the Battle of Fancheng, Wang Fu warns him about a possible invasion by Sun Quan, Liu Bei's estranged ally, while they are away at Fancheng. Guan Yu ignores Wang Fu's warning. Although he wins a Pyrrhic victory at the Battle of Fancheng, Wang Fu's fears come true as Sun Quan sends his general Lü Meng to conquer Jing Province in a stealth invasion while Guan Yu is away. As Guan Yu and his remaining troops are trapped and surrounded by Sun Quan's forces in Maicheng, he attempts to break out of the siege while Wang Fu remains behind to guard Maicheng. Later, upon learning of Guan Yu's capture and execution, Wang Fu commits suicide in Maicheng.

== See also ==
- Lists of people of the Three Kingdoms
