= Qin Mi =

Shu Han politician (died 226)

- 秦宓
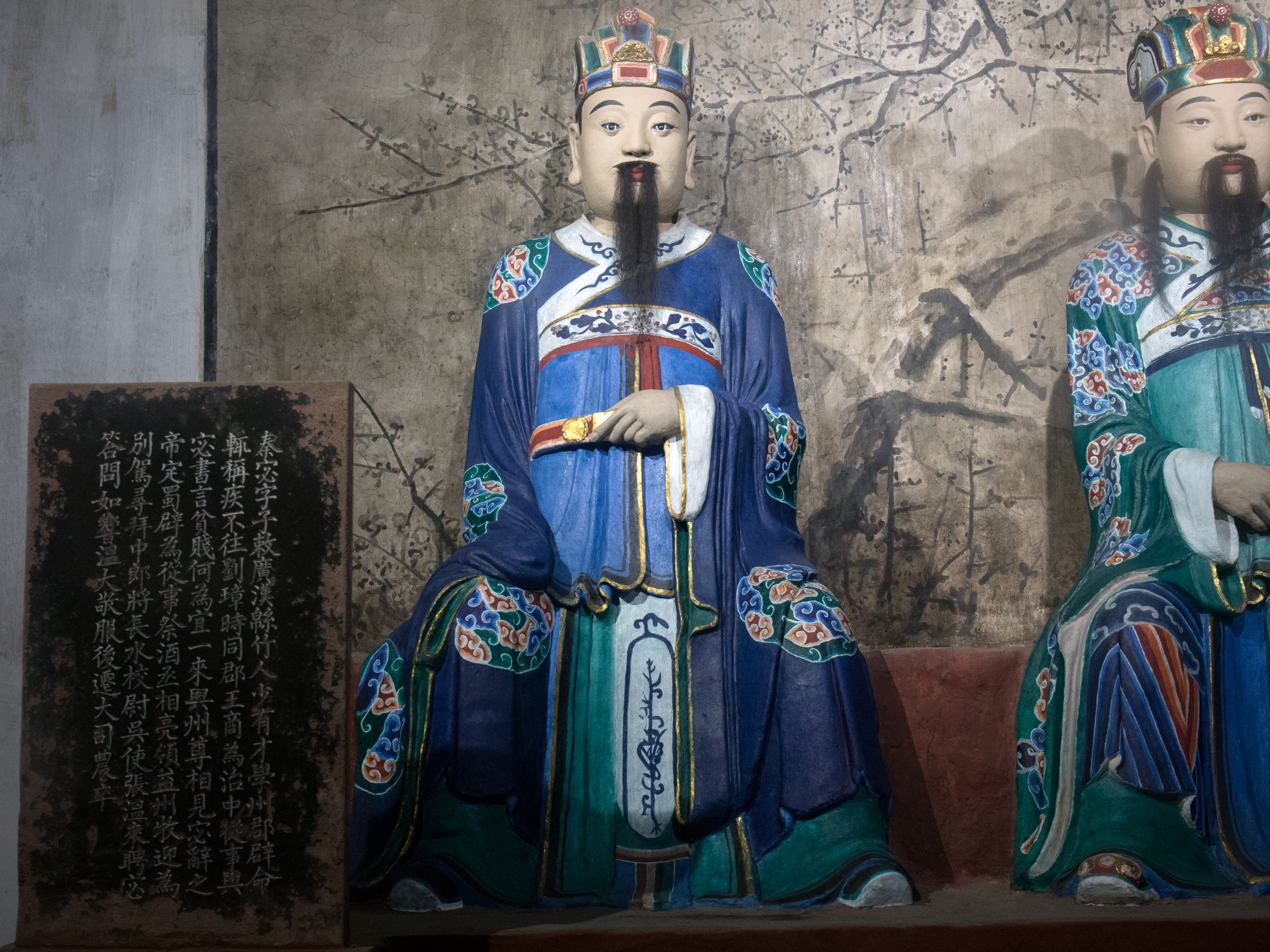
- Statue of Qin Mi in a temple in Chengdu, Sichuan

Minister of Finance (大司農)
- In office ? – 226
- Monarch: Liu Shan
- Chancellor: Zhuge Liang

Changshui Colonel (長水校尉)
- In office ?–?
- Monarch: Liu Shan
- Chancellor: Zhuge Liang

Left General of the Household (左中郎將)
- In office ?–?
- Monarch: Liu Shan
- Chancellor: Zhuge Liang

Assistant Officer to the Governor of Yi Province (益州牧別駕)
- In office 223 – ?
- Monarch: Liu Shan
- Chancellor: Zhuge Liang

Personal details
- Born: Unknown Mianzhu, Sichuan
- Died: 226
- Occupation: Official
- Courtesy name: Zichi (子勑)

Qin Mi (died 226), courtesy name Zichi, was an official of the state of Shu Han during the Three Kingdoms period of China.

== See also ==
- Lists of people of the Three Kingdoms
