= Yidu =

Yidu 宜都市 Itu
- County-level city
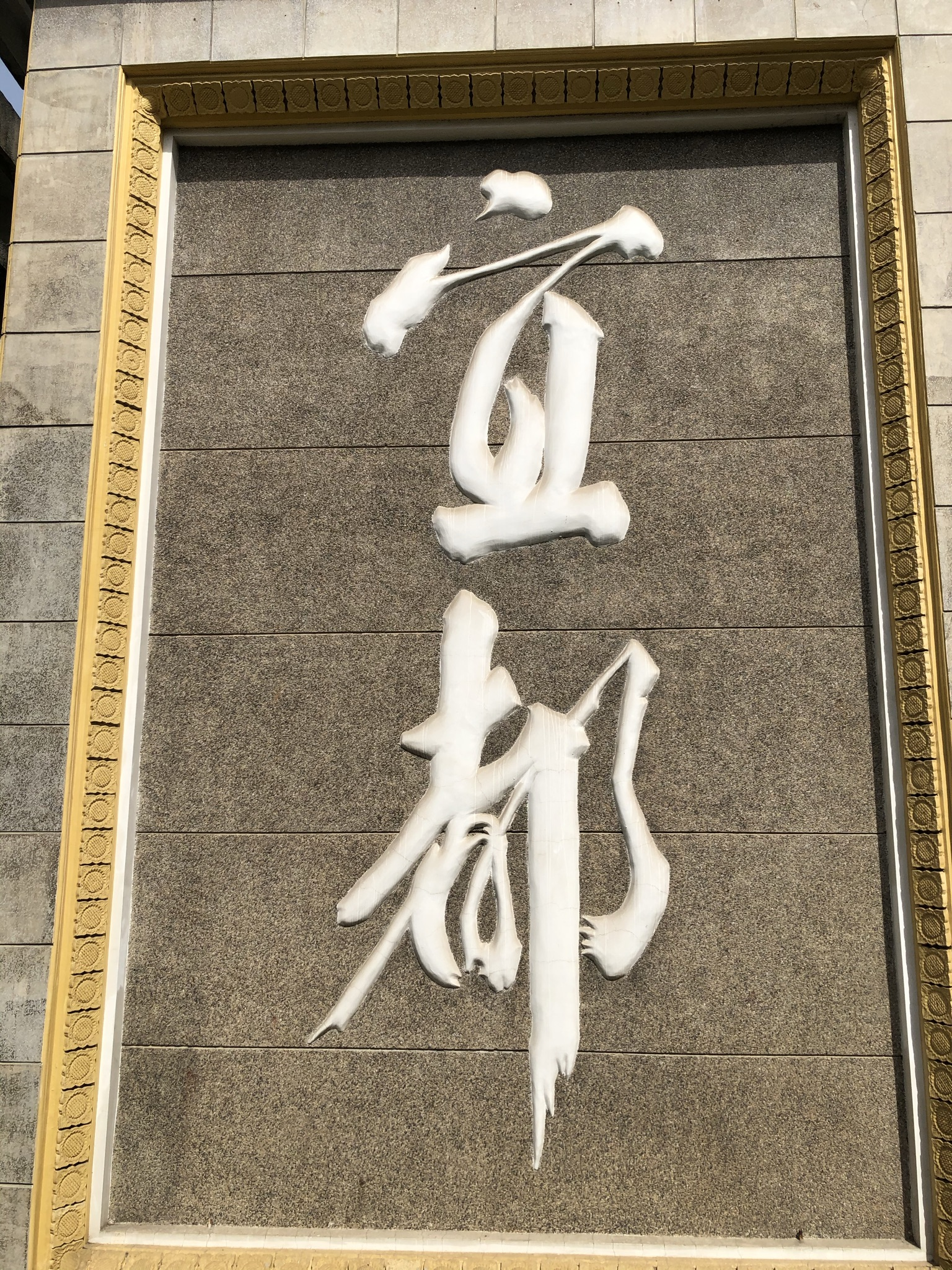
- Chinese Yidu

- Location in Hubei
- Coordinates (Yidu government): 30°22′41″N 111°27′00″E
- Country: People's Republic of China
- Province: Hubei
- Prefecture-level city: Yichang
- Founded: 196 BC

Area
  - County-level city: 1,357 km^{2} (524 sq mi)
  - Urban: 221.50 km^{2} (85.52 sq mi)

Population (2020)
  - County-level city: 347,388
  - Density: 256.0/km^{2} (663.0/sq mi)
  - Urban: 208,903
- Time zone: UTC+8 (China Standard)
- Website: www.yidu.gov.cn

Yidu (Chinese: 宜都; pinyin: Yídū) is a county-level city in western Hubei Province, China. It is under the administration of the prefecture-level city of Yichang. It has a population of 395,000 residents, and covers an area of 1,357 square kilometres (524 sq mi), divided into 1 subdistrict, 8 towns, and 1 township. Its GDP in 2015 was 50 billion yuan.

Yidu was established as a county in 196 BC during the Western Han dynasty, then called Yidao (夷道). In 210 AD, Liu Bei established Yidu Commandery.

== Administrative divisions ==
The only subdistrict is Lucheng Subdistrict (陆城街道)

Towns:

- Honghuatao (红花套镇), Gaobazhou (高坝洲镇), Niejiahe (聂家河镇), Songmuping (松木坪镇), Zhicheng (枝城镇), Yaojiadian (姚家店镇), Wuyanquan (五眼泉镇), Wangjiafan (王家畈镇)

Townships:

- Panjiawan Tujia Ethnic Township (潘家湾土家族乡)

== Climate ==
Climate data for Yidu, elevation 120 m (390 ft), (1991–2020 normals, extremes 1981–present)
Month	Jan	Feb	Mar	Apr	May	Jun	Jul	Aug	Sep	Oct	Nov	Dec	Year
Record high °C (°F)	21.7 (71.1)	29.1 (84.4)	36.4 (97.5)	36.3 (97.3)	38.7 (101.7)	39.6 (103.3)	40.8 (105.4)	40.6 (105.1)	39.1 (102.4)	33.7 (92.7)	30.7 (87.3)	24.0 (75.2)	40.8 (105.4)
Mean daily maximum °C (°F)	8.6 (47.5)	11.6 (52.9)	16.6 (61.9)	23.0 (73.4)	27.4 (81.3)	30.4 (86.7)	33.0 (91.4)	32.6 (90.7)	28.4 (83.1)	22.9 (73.2)	16.9 (62.4)	11.1 (52.0)	21.9 (71.4)
Daily mean °C (°F)	5.0 (41.0)	7.4 (45.3)	11.8 (53.2)	17.7 (63.9)	22.3 (72.1)	25.8 (78.4)	28.3 (82.9)	27.9 (82.2)	23.8 (74.8)	18.4 (65.1)	12.6 (54.7)	7.1 (44.8)	17.3 (63.2)
Mean daily minimum °C (°F)	2.2 (36.0)	4.2 (39.6)	8.2 (46.8)	13.6 (56.5)	18.4 (65.1)	22.3 (72.1)	24.8 (76.6)	24.5 (76.1)	20.5 (68.9)	15.2 (59.4)	9.4 (48.9)	4.2 (39.6)	14.0 (57.1)
Record low °C (°F)	−6.1 (21.0)	−3.6 (25.5)	−1.3 (29.7)	2.0 (35.6)	9.5 (49.1)	13.7 (56.7)	19.0 (66.2)	16.4 (61.5)	11.8 (53.2)	3.5 (38.3)	−1.1 (30.0)	−5.3 (22.5)	−6.1 (21.0)
Average precipitation mm (inches)	36.3 (1.43)	47.2 (1.86)	72.0 (2.83)	127.4 (5.02)	162.1 (6.38)	172.5 (6.79)	216.3 (8.52)	165.1 (6.50)	101.6 (4.00)	89.0 (3.50)	55.3 (2.18)	23.4 (0.92)	1,268.2 (49.93)
Average precipitation days (≥ 0.1 mm)	8.8	9.7	12.5	12.9	14.0	13.2	13.6	11.7	10.2	10.8	9.7	7.9	135
Average snowy days	3.9	2.7	0.9	0	0	0	0	0	0	0	0.2	1.1	8.8
Average relative humidity (%)	75	74	74	75	75	78	79	77	75	75	77	74	76
Mean monthly sunshine hours	78.0	82.8	115.4	142.5	156.8	154.4	193.1	201.1	143.6	126.6	109.7	93.5	1,597.5
Percentage possible sunshine	24	26	31	37	37	37	45	50	39	36	35	30	36
Source: China Meteorological Administration
