= Legends of the Three Kingdoms =

Chinese card game

The wars of the Three Kingdoms
- LTK
- Origin: China
- Alternative names: Sanguo Kill
- Type: Strategy
- Players: 2–10
- Age range: 12+; varies
- Cards: 108
- Rank (high→low): K Q J 10 9 8 7 6 5 4 3 2 A
- Play: counterclockwise
- Playing time: 20-40 minutes
- Chance: medium

Related games
- Bang! (card game)
- Website: https://www.sanguosha.com/ (Official website) http://www.3platform.com/3gs/ (Servers) http://www.sanguosha.us/ (Official website in US)

Legends of the Three Kingdoms (LTK)
- Traditional Chinese: 三國殺
- Simplified Chinese: 三国杀
- Literal meaning: Three Kingdoms Kill
Transcriptions
Standard Mandarin
- Hanyu Pinyin: Sānguóshā

Legends of the Three Kingdoms (simplified Chinese: 三国杀; traditional Chinese: 三國殺; literally Three Kingdoms Kill), or sometimes Sanguosha, LTK for short, is a Chinese card game based on the Three Kingdoms period of China and the semi-fictional 14th century novel Romance of the Three Kingdoms (ROTK) by Luo Guanzhong. The rules of the basic LTK are almost identical to the rules of the older Italian card game Bang!. LTK was released by YOKA games (游卡桌游) on January 1, 2008, and has been followed to date by a total of seven official expansion sets, an online version LTK Online, as well as a children's version LTK Q Version. There are self-created cards by players, but these are mostly unofficial.

LTK initially began with a strong following in China since the entire game is in Chinese. Sales of LTK totaled 20 million yuan in 2009, and 100 million yuan in 2010. However the game has begun to reach an international audience after players began translating the game into the English language and posting these translations on blogs and forums. Site visit statistics from one of these blogs showed that readers outside of Mainland China come primarily from Hong Kong, Taiwan, Singapore, the United States of America, Canada, Australia, United Kingdom, Malaysia, and New Zealand.

== Relevance to history ==
The cards and characters of LTK are all related to the ancient history of China, the most telling of which are the characters and their abilities. Each character is given an ability in the game which usually mirrors the historical character's personality, actions, strength/weakness, cause of death, and historical events in which the character was involved, etc. For example, Liu Bei's ability Kindness (仁德) allows him to give away his cards to other players, mirroring the benevolent and kind nature of Liu Bei in ROTK. Cao Cao, on the other hand, is given the ability Treachery (奸雄), which allows him to keep any card which causes him damage. This mirrors Cao Cao's style in ROTK of coaxing able advisers of his enemies to defect and join him, then utilizing them for his cause.

The relevance of these abilities to ROTK and the Three Kingdoms history is interesting enough to inspire players to discover more about ROTK and Three Kingdoms history for themselves. One blog author describes his knowledge of Three Kingdoms evolving from uninterested to semi-expert after immersing in the study of LTK abilities. In August 2012, UC Berkeley offered a course in LTK. The faculty sponsor of the course, Professor Robert Berring, wants to get undergrads "acquainted with essential philosophy dating back to China's ancient dynasties".

== Basic rules of the standard mode ==
Number of players	Monarch	Minister	Rebel	Traitors
2	1	0	1	0
3	1	0	1	1
4	1	1	1	1
5	1	1	2	1
6	1	1	3	1
6	1	1	2	2
7	1	2	3	1
8	1	2	4	1
8	1	2	3	2
9	1	3	4	1
10	1	3	4	2

The standard mode of LTK can be played by 2 to 10 people. Each player plays one of these four roles: Monarch (主公), Minister (忠臣), Rebel (反贼) and Traitors (内奸). There can be only one monarch in the game at all times, but the number of ministers, rebels and traitors are determined by the total number of players, as shown in the table on the right. Each player may have 3 or 4 Health points (see below), depending on their character.

- If there are 3 or more players playing, the player playing as the Monarch may increase his/her total Health points by 1.
- At the beginning of the game, each player must draw one "Role Card" to determine his or her role.
  - The player who draws the card "Monarch" must immediately show his or her role card. Others must keep their role card hidden until they are dead (Note: Deaths could be not due to player's kill (in terminology, without damage source (伤害来源)), such as those caused by Lightning (闪电).) in the game.
- When the role card has been distributed and all players know their role, each player draws 4 cards.
- The Monarch begins the first round. He will draw 2 cards from the deck and use the cards on hand appropriately.
- When a rebel is killed, the killer draws three cards.
- If the Monarch kills a Minister, the Monarch has to discard all of his cards including equipment cards.

=== Objectives ===
Different roles have different victory conditions:

- Monarch: Death of all the rebels and traitors.
- Minister: Protect the monarch no matter the cost (victory conditions are the same as the monarch).
- Rebel: Death of the Monarch (without leaving one Traitor as the sole survivor).
- Traitor (Secret Rebel): Death of every other player (including the other traitors), with the last death of the Monarch.

The game ends immediately if:

- The Monarch is dead, or
- All the rebels and traitors are dead.

As long as one of the scenarios listed above occur at the endgame, the associated roles can claim victory even if the character has already dead. In general, the Monarch and his ministers must work together to kill the rebels and traitors, while the rebels can cooperate to kill off the ministers before attacking the Monarch. Meanwhile, the traitor(s) can pretend to be ministers and help to kill the rebels, before revolting against the real ministers and finally confronting the Monarch.

=== Types of cards ===
LTK consists of a few types of cards, which serve different purposes in the game.

- ROLE card 角色牌 - These cards determine the individual player's role (Monarch/Ruler/Emperor, Minister/Loyalist, Rebel or Traitor/Turncoat) and his objectives. Aside from the Monarch, other players must keep their role cards secret throughout the game and reveal it when their character is dead in the game.
- Health card/HP card 体力牌 - These cards serve as an indication of units of health of a player. Players typically use their character cards to cover the health cards such that the remaining points of health are revealed.
- General card/Hero card 武将牌 - These cards determine the character that a player shall be using. The player assumes the allegiance and gender of the character selected, and also acquires the special abilities of that player. All characters in LTK are characters which appear in ROTK. The standard edition consists of 25 heroes: (Wei) Cao Cao, Sima Yi, Xiahou Dun, Zhang Liao, Xu Chu, Guo Jia, and Lady Zhen; (Shu) Liu Bei, Guan Yu, Zhang Fei, Zhuge Liang, Zhao Yun, Ma Chao, and Huang Yueying; (Wu) Sun Quan, Gan Ning, Lü Meng, Huang Gai, Zhou Yu, Elder Qiao, Lu Xun, and Sun Shangxiang; (Qun/Neutral/Kingdomless (Note: persons in the End of the Han dynasty but not classified to the three kingdoms)) Hua Tuo, Lü Bu, and Diaochan.
- BASIC cards 基本牌 - These are playable action cards which can be used on other players or themselves. Basic cards include Strike (杀), Dodge (闪), Peach (桃) and their variations, and can affect the health of a player. Strike is used to cause damage to other players, Dodge is used to deflect a Strike attack (or the player loses 1 point of Health), while Peach is used to recover 1 point of Health or save a dying character. Basic cards can be identified by a diamond logo behind Chinese characters in the twelve o'clock position of the card.
- SCROLL cards 锦囊牌 - These cards are cards which perform strategic actions or can affect multiple players. Some of them are DELAYED SCROLL cards (延时类锦囊牌) that only take effect during the target player's turn (Note: specifically, during Judgement phase). All of them can be neutralized by a Invulnerability (无懈可击) SCROLL card, including itself.
- Equipment cards 装备牌 - These cards are placed in front of the player and serve to modify distance and range calculations, as well as contribute to attack or defense attributes.

=== Play ===
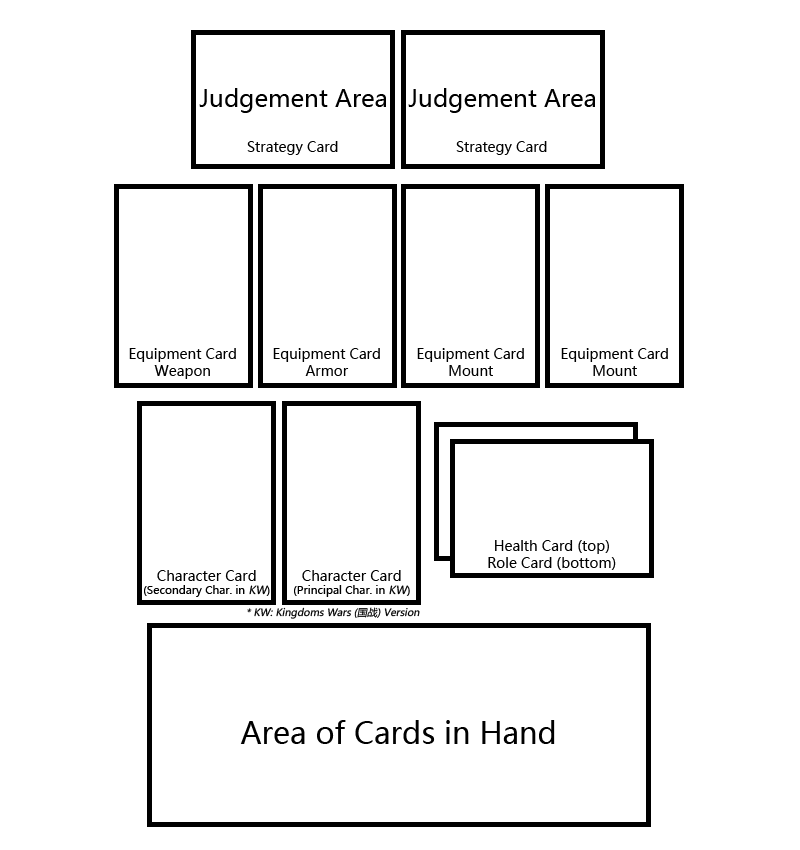
Placement of Personal Cards in a LTK Game

Any player's turn consists of six main phases in the following order, while some phases are skipped automatically due to lack of abilities.

1. Initial phase (准备阶段)
  - Certain characters (Note: such as Zhuge Liang or Lady Zhen) may use their special abilities to manipulate their own statuses or the cards in the deck.
2. Judgement phase (判定阶段)
  - Dealing with delayed scroll cards. If the card is not cancelled (Note: such as by Invulnerability (无懈可击). If all of them are cancelled, there are no judgement in this phase), the player directed at it must judge. For more than one of the cards, start from the last card put. Failure will result in penalties such as to skip Drawing phase, skip Action phase, or lose 3 health points from a Lightning card.
3. Drawing phase (摸牌阶段)
  - The player draws two cards from the deck. Certain characters (Note: such as Zhou Yu or Zhang Liao) may disrupt such as to take more cards or draw cards from other players.
4. Action phase/Playing phase (出牌阶段)
  - Any number of cards may be played, but generally, each player may only use the Strike card once, unless otherwise determined by their character or equipment (Note: such as Zhang Fei or Zhu Ge Crossbow (诸葛连弩)).
5. Discard phase (弃牌阶段)
  - The player discards cards in his hand such that the remaining number of cards is equal to his current Health points. Certain characters (Note: such as Lü Meng or Yuan Shao) may disrupt.
6. End phase (结束阶段)
  - Certain characters (Note: such as Diao Chan or Cao Ren) may use their special abilities.

=== Death ===
When a player's Health points is reduced to 0, he faces imminent death and must instantly take action: he may request to be saved by a Peach card (thus letting other players play the card), or may use one immediately if he has it. If he is successful, his health will recover to 1 point. Otherwise, he dies (except for some special characters (Note: such as Pang Tong or Zhou Tai)), and must reveal his role card and discard all other cards. As forementioned, the killer (if exists) must draw or discard according to the role card.

It is possible for a player's health to have a negative value (such as suffering from a Lightning (闪电) attack). In this case, the player will need as many Peach cards as he requires to raise his health back to 1 point in order to continue the game (for example, a Health point of -1 requires 2 Peach cards). The abilities of certain cards or characters may involve healing more than 1 points of health, or even prolonged living below 1 Health point.

=== Judgment ===
A judgment (判定), or to judge (进行判定), is done by a specific player revealing a card from above of the deck. This card is called Judgment result (判定结果), which identifies passing or failing (Note: usually by the suit or number). It can be altered before becoming effective by certain characters (Note: such as Sima Yi or Zhang Jue) , and shall be discarded if no characters (Note: such as Guo Jia or Cao Zhi) pick.

Judgments are typically done in Judgement phase.

=== Point duels ===
Certain characters (Note: such as Xun Yu or Sun Ce) may initiate point duels (拼点) with another player to unleash their special abilities. This is done when the initiator plays a card, the other player does the same, and both players compare the number printed on the upper left corner. The player with the larger number wins, with "Ace" as the smallest value and "King" as the largest value. In the case of ties, the initiator of the duel is considered to have "lost" the duel. Suits such as diamonds, hearts, etc. do not matter. Both cards are discarded into the discard deck; players cannot retrieve back the cards into their hands.

== Character allegiance ==
All LTK characters are separated into five historically-relevant allegiances: the Shu Kingdom, Wei Kingdom, Wu Kingdom, Jin Kingdom, and Neutral Heroes. In the original LTK, every character has only one allegiance, but later expansions introduced more allegiances for some characters. This is because of the complex changes of each historical figure. Some characters, such as Jia Xu, were allied to different kingdoms through the course of their lives, and is therefore represented by different cards for each allegiance.

With the introduction of the first LTK expansion pack, a new fictional allegiance known as the Demi-Gods was introduced. Demi-God characters are typically very significant characters in ROTK and Three Kingdoms history, and these characters are given abilities that are much more powerful than regular characters. The presence of Demi-God characters can severely imbalance a regular game, and thus most players choose not to include Demi-God characters into gameplay. Since Demi-God characters are obtained by chance in expansion packs, Demi-God character cards have become collectible pieces. Prices of single Demi-God cards have been known to equal, or exceed, the price of the whole expansion pack.

In 2011, YOKA released collectible SP cards that comes with every purchase of Zhuoyou Zhi (桌游志) magazine, a monthly magazine discussing board and card-games in China. Many SP cards are remakes of existing LTK characters with different allegiances, representing that character from a different time period in his or her career.

== Expansion packs and collectibles ==
As of October 2012, seven different official LTK expansion packs have been released. Two different Collector's Editions have also been released. Beginning January 2011, ultra-collectible SP cards were released monthly with every purchase of Zhuoyou Zhi magazine. As of October 2012, the SP Yang Xiu character released with the inaugural issue of Zhuoyouzhi magazine has been seen to sell for 500 yuan, which is over forty times the original price of the magazine.

=== Playing card expansion ===
- Battle Expansion Pack 军争篇 - A playing card expansion that includes elemental attribute Basic cards and new Tool cards.
- Kingdoms Wars 国战 Military Equipment Expansion Pack 势备篇 - A playing card expansion that includes elemental attribute Basic cards and new Tool cards. Available only in Kingdoms Wars.

=== Character card expansions ===
1. Wind Expansion Pack 风扩展包 (including Cao Ren, Xiahou Yuan, Huang Zhong, Wei Yan, Zhou Tai, Xiaoqiao, Zhang Jiao, and Yu Ji)
2. Fire Expansion Pack 火扩展包 (including Xun Yu, Dian Wei, Pang Tong, "Wolong" Zhuge Liang, Taishi Ci, Pang De, Yan Liang & Wen Chou, and Yuan Shao)
3. Woods Expansion Pack 林扩展包 (including Xu Huang, Cao Pi, Zhurong, Meng Huo, Sun Jian, Lu Su, Dong Zhuo, and Jia Xu)
4. Hills Expansion Pack 山扩展包 (including Zhang He, Deng Ai, Liu Shan, Jiang Wei, Sun Ce, Zhang Zhao & Zhang Hong, Zuo Ci, and Cai Wenji)
5. OverKnight Fame 2011 一将成名 2011 (including Cao Zhi, Yu Jin, Zhang Chunhua, Ma Su, Fa Zheng, Xu Shu, Wuguotai, Ling Tong, Xu Sheng, Gao Shun, and Chen Gong)
6. OverKnight Fame 2012 一将成名 2012 (including Cao Zhang, Xun You, Zhong Hui, Wang Yi, Liao Hua, Guan Xing & Zhang Bao, Ma Dai, Bu Lianshi, Cheng Pu, Han Dang, Liu Biao, and Hua Xiong)
7. OverKnight Fame 2013 一将成名 2013 (including Cao Chong, Guo Huai, Man Chong, Guan Ping, Liu Feng, Jian Yong, Pan Zhang & Ma Zhong, Yu Fan, Zhu Ran, Empress Fu, and Li Ru)
8. OverKnight Fame 2014 一将成名 2014 (including Cao Zhen, Chen Qun, Han Hao & Shi Huan, Wu Yi, Zhou Cang, Zhang Song, Sun Luban, Zhu Huan, Gu Yong, Ju Shou, and Lady Cai)
9. OverKnight Fame 2015 一将成名 2015 (including Cao Rui, Cao Xiu, Zhong Yao, Liu Chen, Lady Xiahou, Zhang Ni, Sun Xiu, Zhu Zhi, Quan Cong, Gongsun Yuan, and Guo Tu & Pang Ji)
10. Soul of Original Design 2016 原创之魂 2016 (including Empress Guo, Sun Zi & Liu Fang, Li Yan, Huang Hao, Sun Deng, Cen Hun, Liu Yu, and Zhang Rang)
11. Soul of Original Design 2017 原创之魂 2017 (including Xin Xianying, Ji Kang, Wu Xian, Qin Mi, Lady Xu, Xue Zong, Cao Jie, and Cai Yong)
12. Shadow Expansion Pack 阴扩展包 (including Wang Ji, Kuai Liang & Kuai Yue, Yan Yan, Wang Ping, Lu Ji, Sun Liang, Xu You, and Lu Zhi)
13. Thunder Expansion Pack 雷扩展包 (including Guanqiu Jian, Hao Zhao, Chen Dao, Zhuge Zhan, Lu Kang, Consort Zhou, Yuan Shu, and Zhang Xiu）
14. Kingdoms Wars 国战 Order Expansion Pack 阵扩展包 (newly introduced heroes including Cao Hong, Jiang Wan & Fei Yi, Jiang Qin, and Empress He)
15. Kingdoms Wars 国战 Situation Expansion Pack 势扩展包 (newly introduced heroes including Li Dian, Zang Ba, Lady Mi, Chen Wu & Dong Xi, and Zhang Ren)
16. LTK "1v1" Edition 一战到底 Expansion Pack (2014) (newly introduced heroes including He Jin, Niu Jin, and Han Sui)

=== Collector's editions ===
1. Black Collector's Edition (2010)
2. Red Collector's Edition (2012)

== Variations ==
Variations to the original game are played by people from all over China. The game has since been translated into English. Many people created different ways of playing LTK with no roles.

1. For three players. Two things have to be concerned about: each player must kill the one that is on your right (who takes the next turn) and also try to save to one on the player's left (who takes the preceding turn). A player dies if the player on the left dies.
2. Kingdoms War (with 5 to 12 players) has the same rules without the roles. Everyone chooses their character (five characters to choose from). A few things are different from the original game. The objective is to find the player's ally (who has the same country) and team up to kill other ally. There are no king's abilities. First, players put their character card face down and do not show it to others. Then, whenever a player chooses to use the character's abilities or flip riskily to let others know who the player is. The card is permanently face up because everyone knows which country the player is except when they flip character abilities.
3. Advanced Kingdoms War: Basically same on Kingdoms War. Difference are choose from (6 character cards), from those 6 character cards, players choose two character cards with the same Country. During the game, a player's first character that is revealed is the player's gender for the rest of the game.
4. Fighting the Landlord: A 1v2 gamemode where two Peasants go up against a single Landlord. In order to balance the game, the Landlord always goes first, draws one more card during his drawing phase and can use one more Strike card every turn.

=== Alternate versions (officially released by YOKA) ===
1. LTK "Q" Edition (Kid's version) (2010)
2. LTK "3v3" Edition (2010)
3. LTK "Q God" Edition (Kid's version) (2011)
4. LTK "3v3" Edition 2 (2011)
5. LTK "High School" Edition 校园版 (2012)
6. Kingdoms Wars 国战 (2012)
7. LTK "3v3" Edition 3 (2013)
8. LTK "1v1" Edition (2013)
9. 神话再临 Expansion (Renewed Version) (2013)
10. 界限突破 - 新标无改 (2013)
11. 界限突破 - 修改新将 (2013)

== Criticisms ==
LTK is influenced by Bang! and the two share a lot of characteristics, e.g. the basic cards and tool cards. The similarity motivated the creators of Bang! to sue LTK and its Western distributor. While the court found there was potential for copyright infringement on its initial hearing, it ultimately ruled in favor of Ziko Games and dismissed the case in 2016.

== See also ==
- Bang! (card game)
