= Sun Ce's conquests in Jiangdong =

Military campaigns by warlord Sun Ce (194-199)

- Part of the wars at the end of the Han dynasty
| Date | 194–199 CE |
| Location | Jiangnan region, China |
| Result | Sun Ce victory; foundation laid for the state of Eastern Wu |

Belligerents
| Sun Ce | Various warlords, Shanyue |

Commanders and leaders
| Sun Ce; Zhou Yu; Wu Jing; Sun Ben; Sun Fu; Cheng Pu; Han Dang; Huang Gai; Zhou Tai; Ling Cao; Jiang Qin; Dong Xi; Chen Wu; Lü Meng; Zhang Zhao; Zhang Hong | Liu Yao; Yan Baihu; Xu Gong; Wang Lang; Lu Kang; Liu Xun; Yan Yu †; Huang Longluo †; Ze Rong †; Taishi Ci (surrendered) |

Sun Ce's conquests in Jiangdong
- Traditional Chinese: 孫策平江東之戰
- Simplified Chinese: 孙策平江东之战
- Literal meaning: Sun Ce's war of pacification in Jiangdong
Transcriptions
Standard Mandarin
- Hanyu Pinyin: Sūn Cè Píng Jiāngdōng Zhī Zhàn

Sun Ce's conquests in Jiangdong were a series of military campaigns by the warlord Sun Ce to conquer territories in the Jiangdong and Wu regions from 194 to 199 towards the end of the Eastern Han dynasty. The conquered lands served as a foundation for the state of Eastern Wu during the Three Kingdoms period (220–280).

== Background ==
Sun Ce was the eldest son of the warlord Sun Jian, who was killed in action during the Battle of Xiangyang in 191 against Liu Biao, the Governor of Jing Province. Although Sun Ce was 16 when his father died, he was already well-known and was acquainted with many reputable men.

In 194, Sun Ce went to meet the warlord Yuan Shu, to whom his father was previously subordinate. Yuan Shu was surprised to see Sun Ce, but he refused to return the command of Sun Jian's troops to Sun Ce. At the time, Sun Ce's maternal uncle Wu Jing, the Administrator of Danyang Commandery, was also a subordinate of Yuan Shu. Yuan Shu then ordered Sun Ce to travel to Danyang Commandery and rally his own troops there. Although he managed to muster about a few hundred men, Sun Ce came under attack by Zu Lang (祖郎), a bandit leader in Jing County, and almost lost his life. Sun Ce met Yuan Shu again later. This time, Yuan Shu agreed to return about 1,000 of Sun Jian's troops to Sun Ce. Yuan Shu also initially promised to let Sun Ce be the Administrator of Jiujiang Commandery, but he went back on his word and appointed Chen Ji instead. Yuan Shu planned to attack Xu Province, so he requested 30,000 hu of grain from Lu Kang, the Administrator of Lujiang Commandery, as supplies for his army. However, Lu Kang refused to provide the grain. Sun Ce bore a grudge against Lu Kang because the latter belittled him before. Yuan Shu then sent Sun Ce to attack Lu Kang and told him before he left, "It was my mistake to appoint Chen Ji, and now I often regret not abiding by my original decision. If you defeat Lu Kang, Lujiang will truly be yours." However, Yuan Shu broke his promise again after Sun Ce conquered Lujiang Commandery as he appointed Liu Xun as the Administrator instead. Sun Ce became disappointed with Yuan Shu. In the meantime, Sun Ce had gained the support of other notable persons in Wu territory, such as Ling Cao and Zhou Tai.

Around the time, the territories in Yang Province were under the jurisdiction of Liu Yao, who had been appointed as the Inspector of Yang Province by the Han central government. However, Liu Yao only controlled the four commanderies of Danyang, Wu, Kuaiji and Yuzhang, with Jiujiang and Lujiang (both located north of the Yangtze River) out of his control. Shouchun was initially the capital of Yang Province, but since it was under Yuan Shu's control, Liu Yao moved the provincial capital of his administration to Qu'e County. Liu Yao drove away Wu Jing, the Administrator of Danyang Commandery appointed by Yuan Shu. Wu Jing and Sun Ben (the former Commandant of Danyang, and a cousin of Sun Ce) retreated to Liyang County. As a defensive measure against Wu Jing, Liu Yao ordered Fan Neng (樊能) and Yu Mi (于糜) to garrison at Hengjiang Ford (southeast of present-day He County, Anhui), Zhang Ying (張英) to defend Danglikou (east of present-day He County, Anhui). Yuan Shu appointed his follower Hui Qu (惠衢) as the Inspector of Yang Province and Wu Jing as Military Inspector-General of the Household, and then sent them along with Sun Ben to attack Liu Yao's forces.

== The conquests ==
=== Campaign against Liu Yao ===
In 195, Sun Ce requested permission from Yuan Shu to assist Wu Jing in fighting Liu Yao. Yuan Shu agreed and appointed Sun Ce as Colonel Who Breaks and Charges (折衝校尉) and acting General Who Exterminates Bandits (殄寇將軍). Sun Ce initially had about 1,000 troops, tens of warhorses and hundreds of followers. When he reached Liyang County (present-day He County, Anhui), he had rallied about 5,000 to 6,000 men. Sun Ce's army then crossed the Yangtze River and attacked Liu Yao's base at Niuzhu, obtaining much weapons and provisions. Some time earlier, Xue Li (薛禮), the Chancellor of Pengcheng, and Ze Rong, the Chancellor of Xiapi, both led troops southward and supported Liu Yao as their leader. Xue Li garrisoned at Moling (present-day Nanjing, Jiangsu) while Ze Rong fortified his base at south of Moling. Sun Ce attacked Ze Rong first, defeating him and killing more than 500 of Ze's men. Ze Rong retreated to Moling and remained in the city.

Sun Ce turned his attention towards attacking Xue Li but Xue escaped. At this time, Fan Neng and Yu Mi combined forces to besiege Niuzhu. When Sun Ce heard of that, he returned to break the siege, defeated Fan Neng and Yu Mi, and brought thousands of civilians under his control with his victory. Sun Ce then headed back to attack Ze Rong, but was wounded by a stray arrow during the battle so he stayed in the camp at Niuzhu. To lure Ze Rong out of Moling, Sun Ce ordered his soldiers to spread false rumours that he had died from his injury. Ze Rong fell for the ruse and sent his subordinate Yu Zi (于茲) to attack Sun Ce. Sun Ce sent a few hundred men to engage Yu Zi and lure him into an ambush, where Yu Zi suffered a crushing defeat. Sun Ce then went to Ze Rong's camp and ordered his men to shout, "So, what do you think of Sun Ce now?" Yu Zi was terrified and escaped at night.

When Ze Rong learnt that Sun Ce was still alive, he immediately strengthened his defences by ordering deeper trenches to be dug and higher ramparts built. As Ze Rong was in a strategic defensive position, Sun Ce abandoned the assault. Sun Ce defeated Liu Yao's forces at Hailing, conquered Hushu and Jiangcheng, and led his troops to besiege Qu'e County, the administrative centre of Liu Yao's territories. Around this time, Taishi Ci arrived from Donglai to assist Liu Yao. Although his subordinates advised him to make good use of Taishi Ci in resisting Sun Ce, Liu Yao was suspicious of Taishi Ci and did not dare to let Taishi Ci assume important responsibilities.

One day, when Taishi Ci was scouting outside Qu'e County, he encountered Sun Ce at Shen Village. Sun Ce had about 13 riders accompanying him at the time, including Han Dang, Huang Gai and Song Qian. Taishi Ci knew that the lead rider was Sun Ce so he rode forth to challenge Sun Ce to a duel. During the fight, Sun Ce managed to grab one of Taishi Ci's jis but he also lost his helmet to his opponent. By then, reinforcements from both sides had arrived so Sun Ce and Taishi Ci retreated to their respective bases.

Not long later, Liu Yao was defeated in battle by Sun Ce and his troops abandoned the city and fled. After occupying Qu'e County, Sun Ce rewarded his men and issued an order to the people: "Those who previously served Liu Yao and Ze Rong will not be subject to questioning if they surrender. For those who wish to join the army, one man from each household is sufficient; those who are unwilling will not be compelled." Within one day, Sun Ce succeeded in rallying more than 20,000 troops and 1,000 warhorses.

Meanwhile, Liu Yao and Ze Rong retreated to Yuzhang Commandery. Ze Rong used a scheme to kill Zhu Hao, the Administrator of Yuzhang Commandery, and take over the commandery. Liu Yao led an army from Pengze County (present-day Hukou County, Jiangxi) to attack Ze Rong. Ze Rong fled into the hills after his defeat and met his end at the hands of the natives. The Han central government then appointed Hua Xin as the new Administrator of Yuzhang Commandery to replace Zhu Hao.

While these events were happening in Yuzhang Commandery, Zhu Zhi, one of Sun Ce's subordinates, defeated Xu Gong and seized control of Wu Commandery for his lord. Xu Gong escaped from Wu Commandery and joined the bandit leader Yan Baihu.

=== Campaign against Wang Lang ===
In 196, Sun Ce's subordinates advised him to attack Yan Baihu, but Sun Ce said, "Yan Baihu and his bandits do not have great aspirations. I'll capture them later eventually." Sun Ce then led his troops on a detour, bypassing Yan Baihu's position at the south of Wu Commandery, and proceeded to attack Wang Lang, the Administrator of Kuaiji Commandery along the southern shore of Hangzhou Bay. Yu Fan, an officer under Wang Lang, advised his lord to avoid Sun Ce since they were weaker in terms of military strength. As Sun Ce advanced towards Kuaiji Commandery, Wang Lang moved to defend his territory on the line of the Qiantang estuary at the head of Hangzhou Bay. During his march through Wu Commandery, Sun Ce used the opportunity to rally support from his connections in the region. Sun Ce's uncle, Sun Jing, responded and joined him at Qiantang.

Wang Lang's army was stationed at Guling, where Sun Ce attempted several times to force his way through but failed. Sun Ce then heeded Sun Jing's suggestion and arranged for his uncle to lead a detachment south to a river crossing at Zhadu County (southwest of present-day Xiaoshan District, Zhejiang). From there, Sun Jing headed back to attack Wang Lang's forces at Gaoqian County (northwest of present-day Shaoxing, Zhejiang). That night, Sun Ce then ordered his remaining troops to light the usual number of campfires even though they had less troops, so as to create an illusion that his army's strength was still the same. While Wang Lang was taken by surprise, Sun Ce's forces quickly established a position across the river.

Initially, Wang Lang attempted to organise a retreat and regroup his troops, so he sent Zhou Xin to hold the line against Sun Ce's attack. Sun Ce defeated and killed Zhou Xin, forcing Wang Lang to abandon his territories and escape south to Dongye by sailing along the coast. Wang Lang later surrendered to Sun Ce and spent two years in the region before returning to the Han central government in Xuchang.

Sun Ce appointed himself as the Administrator of Kuaiji Commandery and recruited Yu Fan to serve under him. By 197, Sun Ce had already established a strong foothold in the Jiangdong region and broke off relations with Yuan Shu. In 198, the Han central government promoted Sun Ce to General Who Attacks Rebels (討逆將軍) and enfeoffed him as the Marquis of Wu (吳侯). In addition, Sun Ce's younger brother Sun Kuang married Cao Cao's niece, while Cao Cao's son Cao Zhang married the daughter of Sun Ben (Sun Ce's cousin).

=== Campaign against Yan Baihu, bandits and the Shanyue ===
When Sun Ce defeated Wang Lang, the Prime Minister Cao Cao appointed Chen Yu (陳瑀) from Haixi (southeast of present-day Guannan County, Jiangsu) the Administrator of Wu Commandery. Chen Yu secretly plotted to ally with Yan Baihu to attack Sun Ce. However, Sun Ce sent a naval detachment led by Lü Fan to launch a surprise attack against Chen Yu while he defeated Yan Baihu. Chen Yu was quickly driven out and fled to join Yuan Shao, whose territory was far away from Sun's.

In 198, Yuan Shu sent a messenger to Zu Lang, a bandit leader in Danyang Commandery, promising to grant him an official post if he would oppose Sun Ce. Previously, after Liu Yao's defeat, Taishi Ci escaped to the hills around present-day Wuhu City. He appointed himself as the Administrator of Danyang Commandery and moved to Jing County, where he amassed a large number of Shanyue followers.

After pacifying eastern Danyang Commandery, Sun Ce led his troops to attack Zu Lang at Lingyang County (west of present-day Taiping County, Anhui) and captured him. Although Sun Ce almost lost his life in an earlier battle against Zu Lang before he started his conquests, he spared Zu Lang and allowed him to serve as his subordinate. Later, Sun Ce defeated Taishi Ci at Yongli County (in present-day Jing County, Anhui) and captured him. Sun Ce freed Taishi Ci and succeeded in persuading him to be his subordinate. When Sun Ce's army marched back in triumph, both Taishi Ci and Zu Lang were in the lead. With his victory, Sun Ce gained control over the six counties west of Jing County and fully secured three commanderies in the Jiangdong region.

Around the time, Liu Yao had died of illness in Yuzhang Commandery, leaving behind more than 10,000 followers. Sun Ce sent Taishi Ci to recruit them, saying that it was purely voluntary for Liu Yao's men to join him. When Sun Ce asked Taishi Ci how many men he wanted to bring along with him, the latter replied that he needed only ten men. Sun Ce's aides suspected that Taishi Ci would not return, but Sun Ce said that if Taishi Ci deserted him, he would have no one else to turn to. Sun Ce personally saw Taishi Ci off, held his hand and asked him when he would come back. Taishi Ci replied that he would return within 60 days. As promised, Taishi Ci did return on time and brought along with him several of Liu Yao's followers.

=== Sun Ce breaking relations with Yuan Shu ===
While Sun Ce was attacking the warlords in the Jiangdong region, Yuan Shu was making plans to become emperor. Despite having been in the Huai River region (in present-day Anhui) for years, Yuan Shu did not make any great achievements. Instead, he oppressed the people and disrupted agricultural production with his policies. Although he did not have a good record of successes in battles against rival warlords, he still insisted on becoming emperor against the advice of his followers.

When Sun Ce heard that Yuan Shu was about to declare himself emperor, he wrote a letter to warn Yuan Shu about the potential harms of committing treason. Yuan Shu ignored Sun Ce and hurriedly declared himself emperor and started a new Zhong dynasty around late 196 or early 197. Yuan Shu soon found himself a public enemy because he had committed treason against the reigning figurehead Emperor Xian by declaring himself emperor. Sun Ce officially broke ties with him. The Han central government, then under Cao Cao's control, issued imperial edicts to the warlords Lü Bu and Sun Ce and ordered them to lead their forces to eliminate Yuan Shu's regime. Yuan Shu sent an force south to attack Sun Ce, but it was defeated by his cousin Sun Fu at Liyang. Yuan Shu now send agents into the south to stir up rebellions against Sun Ce, and these caused some trouble for Sun Ce’s regime, taking some time to find and stop all of them.

=== Conquest of Lujiang ===
In the winter of 199, Han imperial forces defeated Yuan Shu and eliminated his Zhong dynasty. Yuan Shu himself died of illness while attempting to flee to northern to join his half-brother, Yuan Shao. Yuan Shu's former subordinates, Yang Hong (楊弘) and Zhang Xun (張勳), planned to surrender to Sun Ce, along with their followers and Yuan Shu's family. However, Liu Xun, the Administrator of Lujiang Commandery, attacked them, took them captive and looted their possessions. When Sun Ce heard about the incident, he pretended to ally with Liu Xun by sending Liu Xun expensive gifts and showering him with praises.

Sun Ce then sought help from Liu Xun in attacking Shangliao County (in present-day Jiangxi), which Liu Xun had already been eyeing for some time. Liu Xun's adviser Liu Ye attempted to dissuade him from attacking Shangliao County, but Liu Xun ignored him. After Liu Xun's army left, Sun Ce split his army into two groups to attack Lujiang Commandery: Sun Ben and Sun Fu led a contingent to Pengze County to cut off Liu Xun's return route; Sun Ce and Zhou Yu led 20,000 troops to assault Lujiang Commandery's capital, Wancheng (皖城; present-day Qianshan County, Anhui), conquered it quickly, and captured Liu Xun's family and subordinates and rescued Yuan Shu's family. Sun Ce then relocated the residents of Lujiang Commandery back to his territories across the Yangtze River. After leaving Li Shu (李術) behind with a garrison of soldiers to guard Lujiang Commandery, Sun Ce returned to join his cousins at Pengze County.

Liu Xun attempted to take Haihun by surprise but the people were forewarned about his attack and he was unsuccessful. When Liu Xun learnt of Sun Ce's attack on Wancheng, he wanted to head back but was cut off by Sun Ben's army at Pengze County and forced to head further west up the Yangtze River. Liu Xun then halted to fortify defensive positions near Mount Xisai, where he requested reinforcements from Liu Biao and Huang Zu. Huang Zu's son, Huang She (黃射), led 5,000 men and a fleet of ships from Jiangxia Commandery to help Liu Xun. Sun Ce defeated the combined forces and captured more than 2,000 enemy troops and 1,000 ships. Liu Xun fled north to join Cao Cao after his defeat. The battle against Huang Zu had been wildly successful for Sun Ce, and he had slain two of Liu Biao's officers while capturing many of Huang Zu's family members and followers. However, his cousin, Xu Kun, had died during the battle.

=== Conquest of Yuzhang ===
Following his victory, Sun Ce moved west to attack Jiangxia Commandery and defeated Huang Zu at Shaxian County (in present-day Wuhan, Hubei). Many enemy soldiers were either killed or drowned. Sun Ce also captured Huang Zu's family and obtained 6,000 vessels. He then turned south to attack Yuzhang Commandery (around present-day Nanchang, Jiangxi) and sent Yu Fan to persuade Hua Xin, the Administrator of Yuzhang Commandery, to surrender. After the elderly Hua Xin surrendered, Sun Ce treated him respectfully like an honoured guest.

== Aftermath ==
In the summer of 200, Sun Ce led his army west to attack Huang Zu again. Chen Deng, the Administrator of Guangling Commandery, allied with Yan Baihu's remnants and attempted to launch a sneak attack on Wu Commandery. However, Sun Ce defeated Huang Zu and returned to deal with Chen Deng, but his army temporarily halted at Dantu County on the way back to await for supplies to arrive. In the meantime, Sun Ce went on a hunting trip with a few men, but the men fell behind as Sun Ce's horse moved faster than theirs. When Sun Ce was alone, he was ambushed by three former servants of Xu Gong, the Administrator of Wu Commandery, whom he killed earlier. He was hit in the cheek by an arrow fired by one of them before his men arrived and killed the assassins. Sun Ce eventually died from his wound days later.

Sun Ce's younger brother, Sun Quan, inherited and expanded his legacy based on the conquered territories in Jiangdong. Sun Quan later became the founding emperor of the state of Eastern Wu during the Three Kingdoms period.

== Order of battle ==
=== Sun Ce forces ===
- Sun Ce
  - † Xu Kun (徐琨), Sun Ce's paternal cousin and Lady Sun's son. Died fighting against Liu Biao's forces at Shaxian.
  - Sun He (孫河), Sun Ce's distant cousin and bodyguard.
  - Cheng Pu
  - Huang Gai
  - Han Dang
  - Zhu Zhi
  - Song Qian
  - Lü Fan
  - Xu Yi (徐逸)
  - Zhang Zhao
  - Jiang Qin
  - Zhou Tai
  - Chen Wu
  - Ling Cao
  - Dong Xi
  - Xu Sheng
  - Quan Rou (全柔)
  - Li Shu (李術)
- Zhou Shang (周尚), Zhou Yu's uncle. He served as the Administrator of Danyang when Wu Jing was attacking Guangling.
  - Zhou Yu, the Chief of Juchao. He helped Sun Ce pacify Jiangdong under the pretext of visiting his uncle.
- Wu Jing, the Administrator of Danyang, Sun Ce's maternal uncle.
  - Sun Ben, the Commandant of Danyang, Sun Ce's cousin. He became the Administrator of Yuzhang after Liu Yao's death.
  - Sun Fu, Sun Ben's younger brother.
- Yuan Shu's support forces:
  - Hui Qu (惠衢)
  - Yuan Yin (袁胤), Yuan Shu's relative. He was driven away by Xu Kun when Yuan Shu sent him to be the Administrator of Danyang.

=== Opposing forces in Yang Province ===
- Liu Yao, the Inspector of Yang Province. He retreated to Yuzhang after being defeated by Sun Ce, and eventually died of illness in 197.
  - Xu Shao, served as an adviser to Liu Yao. Died of illness around the same time as Liu Yao.
  - Fan Neng (樊能), the defending officer of Hengjiang Ford.
  - Yu Mi (于糜), the defending officer of Hengjiang Ford.
  - Zhang Ying (張英), the defending officer of Danglikou.
  - (surrendered) Taishi Ci
- † Ze Rong, a Buddhist leader and the Chancellor of Xiapi. Murdered Xue Li and Zhu Hao (朱皓). He was defeated by Liu Yao and later killed by the Shanyue tribes.
  - Yu Zi (于茲), fled the field after being defeated by Sun Ce.
- † Xue Li (薛禮), the Chancellor of Pengcheng. He was killed by Ze Rong.
- Yan Baihu, a bandit leader in Wu.
  - Yan Yu (嚴輿), Yan Baihu's younger brother. He was killed by Sun Ce while negotiating for peace.
- † Xu Gong, the Commandant of Wu. After suffering initial defeats at the hands of Sun Ce, he attempted to conspire with Cao Cao, but was captured and executed.
- (surrendered) Wang Lang, the Administrator of Kuaiji. Eventually was forced to surrender, then was sent north to join Cao Cao.
  - † Zhou Xin, the former Administrator of Danyang.
  - (surrendered) Yu Fan, an adviser to Wang Lang. He opposed Wang Lang's support of Yan Baihu and joined Sun Ce after Wang Lang's initial defeat.
  - (surrendered) He Qi, the Chief of Yan (剡) County. He chose to support Sun Ce after Wang Lang's initial defeat.
  - Zhang Ya (張雅), a local bandit leader of Houguan. He supported Wang Lang after the latter lost his city to Sun Ce.
  - Xu Jing, Xu Shao's brother. He fled to Shi Xie after Wang Lang's defeat.
- Lu Kang, the former Administrator of Lujiang. He died of illness during the siege of Lujiang.
- Chen Deng, the Administrator of Guangling. Did not participate in fighting directly, but coordinated with Yan Baihu.
  - Chen Jiao (陳矯)
- Chen Yu (陳瑀), Cao Cao's subordinate who was sent to act as an agent against Sun Ce. He was defeated by Lü Fan in a surprise attack and fled to Yuan Shao.
  - † Chen Mu (陳牧), died in battle against Lü Fan.
- (surrendered) Zu Lang (祖郎), a bandit leader in Jing County.
- Huang Longluo (黃龍羅), a bandit leader in Shanyin.
- Zhou Bo (周勃), a bandit leader in Shanyin.
- Liu Biao's support forces:
  - Liu Pan (劉磐), Liu Biao's nephew.
  - Huang Zu, the Administrator of Jiangxia.
  - Huang She (黃射), Huang Zu's son.
  - † Liu Hu (劉虎), Liu Biao's nephew. Killed in battle by Sun Ce at Shaxian.
  - † Han Xi (韓希). Killed in battle by Sun Ce at Shaxian.
- Liu Xun, the Administrator of Lujiang. He joined Cao Cao after being defeated by Sun Ce.
  - Liu Xie (劉偕), Liu Xun's nephew.
  - Liu Ye, joined Cao Cao along with Liu Xun.

== In popular culture ==
The campaign is featured as a playable stage in Koei's video game series Dynasty Warriors, in which it is also known as the Battle of Jiangdong. In 3, by defeating Liu Yao before the other two warlords (Wang Lang and Yan Baihu), the player can force Taishi Ci to surrender. In 5, Liu Yao retreats and Taishi Ci becomes the enemy commander. He joins Sun Ce's side after the player defeats him. In addition, a special event is included, in which Sun Quan is trapped inside one of the enemy forts and the player needs to save him. If the player is playing as Zhou Tai, a cutscene will be triggered, showing a conversation between Zhou Tai and a grateful Sun Quan.
