= Liu Xun =

Liu Xun is the name of:

- Emperor Xuan of Han (91BC – 49BC), given name Liu Xun, emperor of the Han dynasty
- Liu Xun (warlord) (fl. 197–199), warlord and prefect of Lujiang during the late Han dynasty
- Liu Xun (Liu Zhang's son) (fl. 212–214), son of the warlord Liu Zhang during the late Han dynasty
- Liu Xun (Later Liang) (858–921), major general under Zhu Wen during the Tang and Later Liang dynasties
