= Cheng Pu =

Chinese general and politician (fl.170-210)

- 程普

General Who Defeats Bandits (盪寇將軍)
- In office ?–?

Administrator of Jiangxia (江夏太守)
- In office c. early 210s – ?

Administrator of Nan Commandery (南郡太守)
- In office 210 – c. early 210s

Personal details
- Born: Unknown (Note: While Cheng Pu's birth year was not recorded, a Jiang Biao Zhuan annotation in Zhou Yu's biography in Sanguozhi indicated that he was much older than Zhou. Cheng's own biography in Sanguzhi also indicated that he was the oldest among the first-generation generals (likely referring to those who served under Sun Jian).) Fengrun District, Tangshan, Hebei
- Died: Between 210 and 229 (Note: The Sanguozhi did not record when Cheng Pu died. However, it is known that he died after 210, the year in which Zhou Yu died. Cheng had definitely died by 229, when Sun Quan declared himself emperor.)
- Children: Cheng Zi
- Occupation: General, politician
- Courtesy name: Demou (德謀)
- Other names: "Elder Cheng" (程公)

Cheng Pu (fl.170-210), courtesy name Demou, was a Chinese military general and politician serving under the warlord Sun Quan during the late Eastern Han dynasty of China. He previously served under Sun Quan's predecessors: Sun Jian (Sun Quan's father) and Sun Ce (Sun Quan's elder brother).

== Early career under Sun Jian ==
Cheng Pu was from Tuyin County (土垠縣), Youbeiping Commandery (右北平郡), which is located east of present-day Fengrun District, Tangshan, Hebei. He initially served as a minor official in the local commandery office. He was good-looking, resourceful, and well versed in military strategy.

Cheng Pu later came to serve Sun Jian and joined him in suppressing the Yellow Turban Rebellion in the 180s, defeating the rebels at Wan (宛; present-day Wancheng District, Nanyang, Henan) and Deng (鄧; present-day Dengzhou, Henan). In 190, he participated in the campaign against Dong Zhuo on Sun Jian's side, and defeated Dong Zhuo's forces at Yangren (陽人; believed to be near present-day Wenquan, Henan). Cheng Pu fought in several battles and had been wounded many times.

== Service under Sun Ce ==
Sun Jian died in 191 and was succeeded by his eldest son Sun Ce. Cheng Pu continued serving under Sun Ce and accompanied him on his conquests in the Jiangdong region. He aided Sun Ce in conquering Lujiang Commandery (廬江郡) before they crossed the Yangtze River and attacked Hengjiang (橫江) and Dangli (當利), where they defeated Zhang Ying (張英) and Yu Mi (于糜), the subordinates of a rival warlord Liu Yao. Cheng Pu also participated in the conquests of Moling (秣陵), Hushu (湖熟), Jurong (句容) and Qu'e (曲阿). In recognition of his contributions, he was given an additional 2,000 troops under his command and awarded 50 horses. He made many achievements in battle in the subsequent conquests of Wucheng (烏程), Shimu (石木), Bomen (波門), Lingchuan (陵傳) and Yuhang (餘杭).

After Sun Ce conquered Kuaiji Commandery (around present-day Shaoxing, Zhejiang) from its administrator Wang Lang, he appointed Cheng Pu as the Commandant (都尉) of Wu Commandery, with his administrative headquarters at Qiantang County (錢唐縣; present-day Hangzhou, Zhejiang). Cheng Pu was later reassigned as the Commandant of Danyang Commandery (丹楊郡) and he moved to Shicheng County (石城縣). He participated in the campaigns at Xuancheng (宣城) and Jing (涇), and helped to pacify rebellions in Wu (吳), Lingyang (陵陽) and Chungu (春穀) counties. When Sun Ce was attacking the bandits led by Zu Lang (祖郎), he was surrounded by the enemy, but Cheng Pu, accompanied by only one horseman, charged into the encirclement to rescue his lord. Cheng Pu fought fiercely and the bandits withdrew in fear, allowing Sun Ce to escape. Cheng Pu was later appointed as General of the Household Who Defeats Bandits (盪寇中郎將) and the Administrator (太守) of Lingling Commandery (零陵郡). He followed Sun Ce in the campaigns against Liu Xun and Huang Zu at Xunyang (尋陽) and Shaxian (沙羨) respectively, before returning to his garrison at Shicheng.

== Service under Sun Quan ==
When Sun Ce died in 200, Cheng Pu, along with Zhang Zhao and others, pledged allegiance to Sun Quan (Sun Ce's younger brother) and travelled around Sun Quan's territories to attack those who refused to submit to the new lord. Under Sun Quan, Cheng Pu fought at the Battle of Jiangxia in 208 and aided in the conquest of Le'an (樂安) when he passed by Yuzhang (豫章). He later replaced Taishi Ci as the commander of a garrison at Haihun (海昏). During the Battle of Red Cliffs of 208–209, Cheng Pu and Zhou Yu served as the Left and Right Commanders of Sun Quan's army respectively, and scored a major victory in the battle against Cao Cao's forces. Cheng Pu and Zhou Yu also led Sun Quan's forces in the subsequent Battle of Jiangling, a follow-up to the Battle of Red Cliffs, and defeated Cao Cao's general Cao Ren. After those battles, Cheng Pu was promoted to Major-General (裨將軍) and he served as the Administrator (太守) of Jiangxia Commandery (江夏郡), with the commandery capital at Shaxian County (沙羨縣), and was in charge of four counties.

Cheng Pu was the eldest among all the senior military officers under Sun Quan, so the others often addressed him as "Elder Cheng" (程公) to show their respect towards him. He was also known to be a generous man who enjoyed mingling with the scholar-gentry. When Zhou Yu died, Cheng Pu was assigned to replace him as the Administrator (太守) of Nan Commandery (南郡). After Sun Quan agreed to allow his ally Liu Bei to temporarily occupy Nan Commandery, Cheng Pu was relocated to Jiangxia Commandery. Cheng Pu was subsequently promoted to General Who Defeats Bandits (盪寇將軍). It is not known when he died.

== Death ==
Cheng Pu's biography did not state when he died. However, the Wu Shu (吳書; Book of Wu), written by Wei Zhao, mentioned that Cheng Pu killed hundreds of traitors and had their bodies thrown into a fire. He became ill after that incident and died after more than 100 days later.

In May 229, after Sun Quan declared himself emperor and established the state of Eastern Wu, he granted Cheng Pu's son, Cheng Zi (程咨), a marquis title in recognition of Cheng Pu's contributions.

== In popular culture ==
Cheng Pu became a playable character in Koei's Dynasty Warriors 9. He is also a character in Total War: Three Kingdoms.

In the 2010 TV show Three Kingdoms, Cheng Pu dies from an arrow shot by Shamoke during a battle around 220 with Shu forces. After claiming Jing Province back and also beheading Guan Yu, Liu Bei declared war on Sun Quan's Wu out of retaliation and grief. To counter the move, Sun Quan sent two generals, Han Dang and Zhou Tai with around 80,000 troops to face the oncoming Shu forces. However, Shu's Huang Zhong and Shamoke routed Wu's forces without much issue which caused both Han Dang and Zhou Tai to be stuck in the melee without any way of escape. Cheng Pu then charged into the battle zone with around 500 cavalry units to try and extract both Han Dang and Zhou Tai out but in the process got shot in the chest by Shamoke and subsequently died of his wounds.

== See also ==
- Lists of people of the Three Kingdoms
