= Jiang Qin =

General serving warlord Sun Quan (died 219)

- 蔣欽

Right Protector of the Army (右護軍)
- In office late 210s – 219

Area Commander of Ruxu (濡須督)
- In office c. 215–?

General Who Defeats Bandits (盪寇將軍)
- In office c. 215–?

Personal details
- Born: Unknown Shou County, Anhui
- Died: late 219/early 220 (Note: The Sanguozhi recorded that Jiang Qin died of illness on his way back to Wu after participating in Lü Meng's invasion of Jing Province in 219.)
- Children: Jiang Yi; Jiang Xiu
- Occupation: General
- Courtesy name: Gongyi (公奕)

Jiang Qin (died late 219/early 220), courtesy name Gongyi, was a military general and naval specialist serving under the warlord Sun Quan during the late Eastern Han dynasty of China. He previously served under Sun Quan's elder brother and predecessor, Sun Ce, and participated in various battles throughout his service under the Sun family, including Sun Ce's conquests in Jiangdong, the Battle of Xiaoyao Ford and Lü Meng's invasion of Jing Province, twice holding joint command of the Sun armies.

== Service under Sun Ce ==
Jiang Qin was from Shouchun County (壽春縣), Jiujiang Commandery (九江郡), which is in present-day Shou County, Anhui. He and Zhou Tai joined Sun Ce in 194, serving as an Attendant (給事) under Sun Ce when Sun Ce served under the warlord Yuan Shu. When Sun Ce crossed the Yangtze River to start his conquests of the territories in the Jiangdong region, Jiang Qin was appointed as a Major of Separate Command (別部司馬) and placed in command of some troops. He accompanied Sun Ce on the campaigns and assisted in the conquests of Danyang (丹陽), Wu (吳), Kuaiji (會稽) and Yuzhang Commanderies (豫章郡). He was later reassigned to be the Commandant of Geyang (葛陽尉) and was placed in charge of three counties. During his tenure, he defeated bandits and rebels so was promoted by Sun Quan to Commandant of the West (西部都尉) where he could help the new regime.

When Lü He (呂合) and Qin Lang (秦狼) led an uprising in the five eastern counties in Kuaiji Commandery, Jiang Qin led his troops to fight them and succeeded in pacifying the five counties and capturing the two rebel leaders. For his achievement, he was promoted to General of the Household Who Attacks the Yue (討越中郎將) and placed in charge of Jingqu (涇拘) and Zhaoyang (昭陽) counties. Jiang Qin later led 10,000 troops to assist He Qi in expanding Sun reach south against the local people (黝縣) in Min River and Xindu campaigns.

== Service under Sun Quan ==
Jiang Qin participated in the Battle of Xiaoyao Ford in 214-215. He was with his lord Sun Quan when they came under attack by the enemy general Zhang Liao at Xiaoyao Ford, Jiang Qin fought bravely and was promoted to General Who Defeats Bandits (盪寇將軍). He shared joint command with Lü Meng, whom Sun Quan had both urged to study, in the 217 defense of Ruxu against Cao Cao with Jiang Qin controlling the navy, though they suffered in a storm and lost Dong Xi, Cao Cao retreated. He was later recalled to the Wu capital and was commissioned as Right Protector of the Army (右護軍) which gave him responsibility for army discipline.

In 219, Sun Quan ordered Lü Meng to lead an army to invade Jing Province when its defender, Guan Yu (a general under Liu Bei), was away at the Battle of Fancheng. Jiang Qin participated in the campaign and led a naval force up the Mian (沔), acting as a guard against any counter measure by Guan Yu.

== Anecdotes ==
=== Sun Quan's home visit ===
Sun Quan once visited Jiang Qin's house and saw that Jiang's mother had only a light bed-curtain and cotton blankets, while Jiang's wife and concubines wore only simple cloth dresses. Sun Quan was so impressed with Jiang Qin's frugality that he ordered his own household to make silk blankets for Jiang's mother and exchange her curtains for better ones. Jiang Qin's wife and concubines also received silk and embroidered garments.

=== Incident with Xu Sheng ===
Once, when Jiang Qin was stationed in Xuancheng County (宣城縣) and was out fighting rebels in Yuzhang Commandery, Xu Sheng, who was then the Prefect (令) of Wuhu, arrested an officer under Jiang Qin and requested for permission from Sun Quan to have the officer executed. As Jiang Qin was away at that time, Sun Quan denied the request. Xu Sheng had since estranged himself from Jiang Qin. Later, during the Battle of Ruxu in 217, Jiang Qin and Lü Meng were put in charge of military discipline. Xu Sheng was constantly worried that Jiang Qin would find fault with him, but, much to his surprise, Jiang praised him instead, and Xu was very impressed by Jiang's virtuous behaviour. Jiang Qin became more highly regarded after this incident. Sun Quan later asked Jiang Qin, "Xu Sheng offended you earlier on, but yet now you praise him. You wish to emulate Qi Xi, (Note: Qi Xi (祁奚) was a politician in the Jin state during the Spring and Autumn period. He once recommended Xie Hu (解狐), whom he had a personal feud with, to assist Duke Dao of Jin.) don't you?” Jiang Qin replied, “I heard that one should not let his personal feuds affect his official duties. Xu Sheng is loyal and hardworking, possesses both courage and talent, and is capable of leading thousands of troops. Now, we've yet to accomplish our great task, so I should help to scout for and recommend talents to serve the state instead of letting my private problems cloud my judgment.” Sun Quan was very pleased.

== Legacy and descendants ==
After the victory against Guan Yu, Jiang Qin fell sick and died on the way back to Wu. Sun Quan, who saw Jiang Qin and Lü Meng as exemplary men who understood the value of learning as adults, personally donned mourning attire when he attended Jiang Qin's funeral. Rafe De Crespigny notes Jiang Qin seems to have been something of a naval specialist and a notable loss to Sun Quan. The southern scholar Lu Ji after the war writing his Dialects of Destruction listed Jiang Qin as one of the many valiant warriors Sun Quan brought to his flag and who exerted their power for the state.

Sun Quan gave 200 taxable households and 200 acres (0.81 km^{2}) of land in Wuhu to Jiang Qin's family. Jiang Qin's son, Jiang Yi (蔣壹), received the title "Marquis of Xuancheng” (宣城侯) and fought well at the Battle of Xiaoting in 221-222 against Liu Bei's forces. He was later dispatched to Nan Commandery (南郡) to join in the Battle of Jiangling but was killed in service of Wu. Jiang Yi had no son so his military post was inherited by his younger brother, Jiang Xiu (蔣休). Jiang Xiu was later discharged from service for committing an offence.

== In Romance Of The Three Kingdoms ==
First appears when Sun Ce fights Liu Yao, he and Zhou Tai are brigands who hear Sun Ce values men of talent so gather three hundred supporters and set fire to Zhang Ying's camp to force Liu Yao to retreat, he and Zhou Tai are given a command role in the vanguard. Against Yan Baihu with Yan Yu holding a key bridge, goes with Chen Wu on a small boat to fire upon the defenders on the bank then charges with sword out, forcing the defenders back. Takes part at Battle of Red Cliffs with command of the right squadron of Zhou Yu's naval force. Successfully volunteers to lead vanguard in Battle of Jiangling but is nearly executed for failure to stop Cao Ren and Niu Jin cutting their way out of trap. Takes leading part in the fictional attempt to stop Liu Bei and his new wife Lady Sun leaving, pressing the other Sun officers to pursue but Zhuge Liang arrives in time to thwart them.

== See also ==
- Lists of people of the Three Kingdoms
