= Yan Baihu =

Late 2nd century Eastern Han bandit leader

- Traditional Chinese: 嚴白虎
- Simplified Chinese: 严白虎
Transcriptions
Standard Mandarin
- Hanyu Pinyin: Yán Báihǔ

Yan Baihu, also known as White Tiger Yan, was a bandit leader active in the Wu or Jiangdong region during the late Eastern Han dynasty of China. While he did not have his own biography in Records of the Three Kingdoms by Chen Shou, he was mentioned in Sun Ce's biography in the work.

== Life ==
"Baihu" was not Yan's real name, but a nickname given to him due to his physical prowess or skin colour; thus his name should be translated as "White Tiger Yan". According to the Records of the Three Kingdoms, Yan Baihu was very influential with the Shanyue tribes and even with the Han officials in the Wu area. When Liu Yao was appointed as Governor of Yang Province, he approached Yan Baihu to bribe him to get his support against the warlord Yuan Shu, who had a large army in the Huai River valley.

After the warlord Sun Ce defeated Liu Yao at the beginning of a series of conquests in the Jiangdong region, Yan Baihu successfully re-established and then increased his private army to tens of thousands, composed of elite Shanyue fighters, in preparation for a final showdown with Sun Ce. As head of a loose confederation of bandits and local officials, Yan Baihu formed an alliance with another warlord, Wang Lang, who had enough provisions to account for all of the alliance's soldiers.

Despite Yan Baihu's preparations, Sun Ce was able to outwit Wang Lang and took his supply base through the use of superior tactics. With no supplies, Yan Baihu and Wang Lang were easily defeated by Sun Ce. Yan Baihu then fled into the hills, where he continued to encourage the Shanyue people to oppose Sun Ce's rule over the Jiangdong territories. Yan Baihu lived at least up until the time of Sun Ce's death.

== In Romance of the Three Kingdoms ==
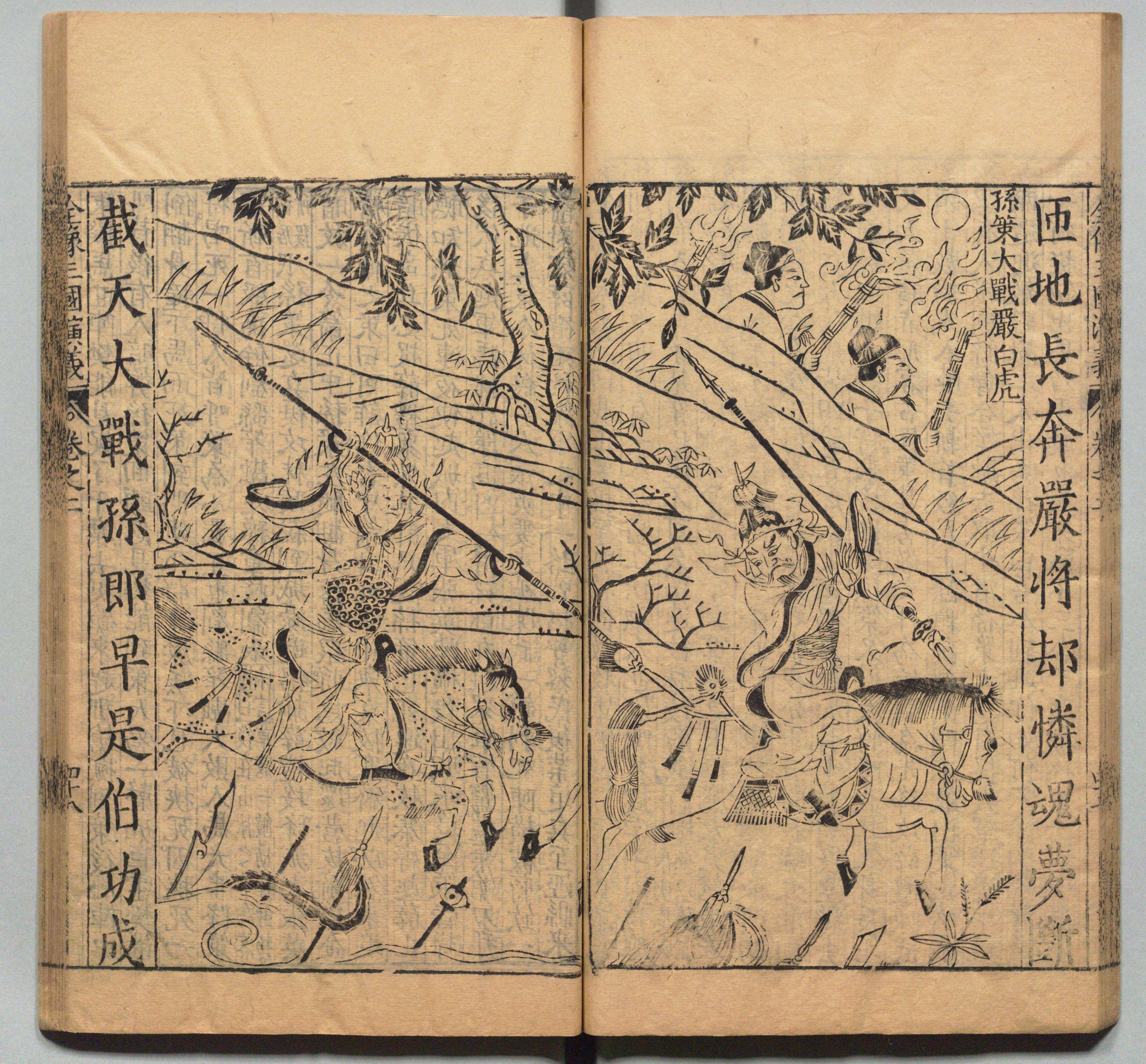
Ming dynasty woodblock print of Sun Ce battling Yan Baihu

In the 14th-century historical novel Romance of the Three Kingdoms, Yan Baihu was attacked by Sun Ce and then fled to Wang Lang to seek help. While seeking the aid of Wang Lang, however, his army was defeated by Ling Cao and his son, Ling Tong. During Yan Baihu's retreat, Dong Xi caught up with him and slew him. Dong Xi then sent Yan Baihu's head in a box to Sun Ce.

== See also ==
- Lists of people of the Three Kingdoms
