= Liu Ye (Three Kingdoms) =

Chinese adviser to warlord Cao Cao (died 234)

- 劉曄

Palace Counsellor (太中大夫)
- In office ? – 234
- In office 232 – ?
- Monarch: Cao Rui

Grand Herald (大鴻臚)
- In office c.230s–?
- Monarch: Cao Rui

Palace Attendant (侍中)
- In office 220 – ?
- Monarch: Cao Pi

Personal details
- Born: 170s Shou County, Anhui
- Died: 234 (Note: Liu Ye's biography in the Sanguozhi recorded that he was in ill health when he was appointed Palace Counsellor in the 6th year of the Taihe era (227–233) of Cao Rui's reign. During this period, he also served as Grand Herald for about two years before being re-appointed Palace Counsellor; this was his last post before his death. Therefore, it is deduced that he died in 234, which corresponds to the 2nd year of the Qinglong era (233–237) of Cao Rui's reign. Vol.72 of Zizhi Tongjian dated his death to 232.)
- Relations: Liu Huan (brother)
- Children: Liu Yu; Liu Tao
- Parent: Liu Pu (father)
- Occupation: Official
- Courtesy name: Ziyang (子揚)
- Posthumous name: Marquis Jing (景侯)
- Peerage: Marquis of Dong Village (東亭侯)

Liu Ye (170s (Note: According to the chronology of Liu Ye's biography in Sanguozhi, he was in his 20s while serving under Liu Xun. Liu Xun was independent only in 199, after Yuan Shu's death. By calculation, Liu Ye's birth year should be in the 170s.) - 234), courtesy name Ziyang, was an adviser to the warlord Cao Cao during the late Eastern Han dynasty of China. After the fall of the Eastern Han dynasty, he served as an official in the state of Cao Wei during the Three Kingdoms period, serving under Cao Pi and Cao Rui. He was a member of the House of Liu, the imperial clan of the Han dynasty, and a direct descendant of Emperor Guangwu, via Guangwu's seventh son Liu Yan. He had two sons: Liu Yu (劉寓) and Liu Tao (劉陶).

== Early life ==
Liu's mother died when he was six. On her deathbed, she told him and his brother Liu Huan to kill a dangerous and treacherous servant belonging to his father Liu Pu (劉普) once they were older. Liu killed the servant six years later. Liu Pu was angry and asked his son the reason for the murder. Liu Ye replied that he was just following his mother's last wish and was ready to take punishment. After hearing the explanation, Liu Pu had a change of heart, and forgave Ye.

While Xu Shao was at Yangzhou, he praised Liu Ye as someone with the ability to help a sovereign govern his realm.

Due to his family background and act of killing the servant, Liu already had a great reputation when he was in his early twenties. During this time, some local rich landowners had formed their own private armies. Among them, Zheng Bao (郑宝) was the strongest and he wanted to force people living in Huainan to move to another prefecture. Zheng wanted to take advantage of Liu's reputation to assist with the eviction; Liu Ye was unwilling to do so. Around this period, an emissary from Cao Cao came to visit Liu Ye to discuss current state of affairs; Liu Ye persuaded the emissary to stay with him for a few days. Zheng Bao wanted to meet Cao Cao's emissary, so he went to Liu's home with hundreds of soldiers, bringing along cows and wine. Liu Ye then entertained Zheng with a feast. During the feast, he killed Zheng during a toast and threatened the now-leaderless soldiers to withdraw by claiming that by Cao Cao's orders, anyone who attacked would be guilty of the same offences as Zheng. After the feast, Liu went to Zheng Bao's military camp with several servants. At the camp, Liu persuaded Zheng's private army to surrender by analysing the situation for the soldiers. Liu Ye felt that as a member of the imperial Liu clan, he should not have his own army as the Han dynasty was by then floundering; he then gave these thousands of surrendered soldiers to the local governor, Liu Xun (劉勛). After this incident, Liu Ye became a counselor serving under Liu Xun.

Liu Ye could be the "Liu Ziyang" mentioned in Lu Su's biography in Sanguozhi, who was a friend of Lu and wrote a letter to him, asking him to join Zheng Bao. Sima Guang, author of Zizhi Tongjian, was skeptical that "Liu Ziyang" was Liu Ye. (Note: In Zizhi Tongjian, Sima Guang dated Liu Ye's killing of Zheng Bao to the 4th year of the Jian'an era (c.199), while dating Zhou Yu's persuasion to Lu Su to stay in Jiangdong to the 5th year of said era (c.200). In the record of the incident found in Tongjian, there was no mention of Liu Ziyang. In Zizhi Tongjian Kaoyi, Sima Guang expressed his skepticism that the "Liu Ziyang" mentioned in Lu Su's biography in Sanguozhi was referring to Liu Ye. Sima Guang argued that Lu Su was about to join Zhou Yu, and by extension, Sun Quan. According to the account in Liu Ye's biography in Sanguozhi, Liu killed Zheng Bao and Zheng Bao's troops subsequently joined Liu Xun. Liu Xun was then defeated by Sun Ce. If "Liu Ziyang" was indeed Liu Ye, then the chronology of events would not make sense.)

== Serving Liu Xun ==
While Liu Ye was serving under Liu Xun, Sun Ce invited Liu Xun to attack Shangliao City (上缭城); Sun sent Liu Xun gifts and Sun's emissary was overly humble. Liu Ye advised Liu Xun not to attack Shangliao, but Liu Xun did not listen. During the attack on Shangliao, Sun Ce attacked Liu Xun. The defeated Liu Xun then decided to join Cao Cao, and Liu Ye followed suit.

== Serving Cao Cao ==
Before Wei Feng's rebellion, he had an excellent reputation, and many middle- and low- ranking officials were close friends of Wei. However, Liu Ye, upon seeing Wei for the first time, claimed that Wei will eventually rebel.

After Zhang Lu had surrendered to Cao Cao, Liu Ye urged Cao to use the opportunity to attack Yi Province which at the time was newly occupied by Liu Bei; he further warned that if Liu Bei was allowed to establish himself, he would cause trouble to Cao Cao in the future. However, Cao Cao rejected the idea. (Note: Sima Yi also advised Cao Cao to attack Yi Province, but Cao also declined.)

== Serving Cao Pi ==
After Guan Yu's death, Cao Pi once held a meeting with court officials to discuss if Liu Bei would invade Wu to avenge Guan. Most officials were of the opinion that Shu was a "small country" and only had one famous general: Guan; now that Guan was dead and his troops scattered, Shu would be filled with fear and would not dare to attack. However, Liu Ye gave a different opinion: "Shu may be weak, but given Liu Bei's desire to have a show of force, he'll definitely mobilise his armies to show that he is still a threat to be reckoned with. Also, Guan Yu and Liu Bei have a deep relationship: they are sovereign and subject, as well as father and son. If Liu Bei cannot mobilise his armies to avenge Guan, it would not be a fitting end to this relationship."

In late 220 or early 221, (Note: The 1st year of the Huangchu era ends on 9 Feb 221 in the Julian calendar.) not long after Cao Pi crowned himself emperor, Meng Da defected to Wei and brought with him 4000 soldiers. Meng Da received various important appointments and the title of a marquis. In addition, Cao Pi merged the three commanderies of Fangling, Shangyong and Xicheng (西城) to form a larger commandery, Xincheng (新城), and he appointed Meng Da as the Administrator (太守) of Xincheng and tasked him with defending Wei's southwestern border. Liu Ye advised Cao Pi, "Meng Da is always looking out for rewards which are not rightfully his, and he is prone to schemes due to his talent. Thus, he will not be grateful to Your Excellency. Xincheng borders Sun Quan's and Liu Bei's territories. If the regional situation changes, it will create troubles for the realm."; Cao Pi ignored Liu. (Note: Meng Da would eventually rebel after Cao Pi's death.)

Also in 220, Liu Ye was made Palace Attendant (侍中) and bestowed the peerage of a Secondary Marquis (關內侯). At that time, Cao Pi asked his court whether Liu Bei would avenge Guan Yu, who was killed during Sun Quan's attack on Jingzhou. Most of them opined that Shu was a small state and that Guan Yu was its only famous general. But Liu Ye thought that Liu Bei would definitely wage war to revive his prestige; he also believed that Liu Bei and Guan Yu had a very close relationship and so Liu would avenge Guan. In the end, Liu Bei did attack Sun Quan the following year. By then, Sun Quan was mobilising the power of the entire state of Wu to deal with the invasion, and he proclaimed himself a vassal to Cao Wei. Many officials congratulated Cao Pi, but Liu Ye believed that Sun Quan had no intention of submitting, and submitted himself as a vassal only as a last resort. Liu Ye even suggested that Cao Pi take advantage of the situation to lead troops to attack Wu to avoid future troubles. But Cao Pi disagreed, in a decision that most historians believe doomed his domain to ruling only the northern frontiers of China - such an opportunity would not come again; Cao Pi's future expeditions against Eastern Wu would all end in failure.

When Zhang Liao fell ill while stationed at Yongqiu, Cao Pi sent Liu Ye, along with imperial physicians, to visit Zhang. Also, just before Cao Pi's death, he asked various officials, including Liu Ye, about Yang Fu. At the officials' recommendations, Cao Pi wanted to promote Yang, but died before he could do so.

== Serving Cao Rui ==
Liu Ye continued his service under Emperor Cao Rui. According to the Zizhi Tongjian, at one point Liu Ye gave conflicting perspectives about attacking Shu. He supported the campaign in front of Cao Rui, but he told other officials that he was actually against the campaign. When Cao Rui asked him about it, Liu Ye said that he was doing that to make sure the war plans were not spreading. However, Liu Ye's relationship with Cao Rui became distant when the emperor was warned by someone that Liu was good in reading Cao Rui's intention and then just agreeing with him. Cao Rui decided to test this out by consulting Liu Ye about something that he actually did not agree with, and he found Liu Ye agreeing with him. When he realized that Liu Ye was indeed pandering to him, he began to avoid Liu. He continued serving Wei until he died in 234.

The historical novel Romance of the Three Kingdoms told a similar event. Cao Rui consults Liu Ye about the plan of invading Shu, and the advisor agrees. But later Liu Ye tells other officials that attacking Shu is actually too difficult. After hearing about this, Cao Rui confronts Liu Ye. However, the advisor says he is simply keeping the plan secret, and Cao Rui believes that.

== See also ==
- Lists of people of the Three Kingdoms
