= Huang Gai =

Han dynasty general under warlord Sun Quan

- 黃蓋
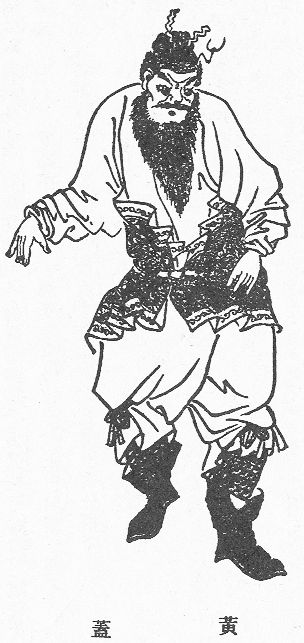
- A Qing dynasty illustration of Huang Gai

Administrator of Wuling (武陵太守)
- In office 209 or after – ?

Lieutenant-General (偏將軍)
- In office 209 or after – ?

General of the Household of Martial Edge (武鋒中郎將)
- In office 209 or after – ?

Commandant of Danyang (丹楊都尉)
- In office ?–?

Prefect of Xunyang (尋陽令)
- In office ?–?

Chief of Chungu (春穀長)
- In office ?–?

Personal details
- Born: Lingling District, Yongzhou, Hunan
- Died: Changde, Hunan
- Children: Huang Bing
- Occupation: General
- Courtesy name: Gongfu (公覆)

Huang Gai (fl. 180s–210s), courtesy name Gongfu, was a military general who served under the warlord Sun Quan during the late Eastern Han dynasty of China. He previously served under Sun Quan's predecessors – Sun Jian (Sun Quan's father) and Sun Ce (Sun Quan's elder brother).

== Early life ==
Huang Gai was from Quanling County (泉陵縣), Lingling Commandery (零陵郡), which is present-day Lingling District, Yongzhou, Hunan. He was a descendant of Huang Zilian (黃子廉), a former Administrator of Nanyang Commandery. Huang Gai's grandfather moved from Nanyang to Lingling and had remained there since. Huang Gai was orphaned at a young age and he experienced hardships in his early days. However, he had high ambitions and, despite being poor, he worked hard and read books and studied military arts on his own.

== Early career and service under Sun Jian and Sun Ce ==
Huang Gai later became a minor official in the local commandery office before he was nominated as a xiaolian and employed as an assistant in the office of one of the Three Ducal Ministers. Around the 180s, when the warlord Sun Jian was raising a militia to help government forces suppress the Yellow Turban Rebellion, Huang Gai responded to the call and became one of Sun Jian's subordinates. Huang Gai accompanied Sun Jian in attacking bandits in the region and also participated in the campaign against Dong Zhuo under Sun Jian's banner. Huang Gai was later appointed as a Major of Separate Command (別部司馬). After Sun Jian's death in 191, Huang Gai continued to serve under Sun Jian's eldest son, Sun Ce, and later under Sun Quan, Sun Ce's younger brother. He was involved in Sun Ce's conquests in the Jiangdong region.

== Service under Sun Quan ==
=== Maintaining peace and stability within Wu ===
When Sun Quan was in control of the Wu territories, the lands were not very peaceful as the Shanyue tribes in the region often raided counties and caused much trouble. Huang Gai was sent to pacify the Shanyue. Once, Huang Gai was assigned to oversee Shicheng County and he knew that the local officials did not follow the laws and were difficult to control. After entering the county office, he chose two officers to be his assistants and ordered them to manage the office. He also gave instructions for all the officers to abide by rules and regulations and perform their duties well. The two officers were afraid of Huang Gai so they put in full effort in their work. However, as time passed, they realised that Huang Gai did not inspect their work, so they became lax and reverted to their old ways. Huang Gai was actually aware of what was going on. He invited all the local officials to attend a banquet later and exposed the two officers' misdeeds in front of everyone. The officers were frightened and started begging for their lives, but Huang Gai still executed them. This incident shocked everyone in the county. Huang Gai was later reassigned to be the Chief of Chungu County (春穀縣; northwest of present-day Fanchang County, Anhui) and the Prefect of Xunyang County (尋陽縣; southwest of present-day Huangmei County, Hubei). The nine counties under his governorship were peaceful and stable. Huang Gai was subsequently promoted to Commandant of Danyang Commandery (丹楊郡; around present-day Nanjing, Jiangsu). He helped the poor and earned the respect of the Shanyue.

=== Battle of Red Cliffs ===
In the winter of 208–209, Huang Gai fought in the Battle of Red Cliffs against Cao Cao's forces. He was a subordinate of Zhou Yu, who was the frontline commander of Sun Quan's forces in that battle. Huang Gai told Zhou Yu: "The enemy are superior in numbers in comparison with our side. I fear that we cannot last long. However, I observe that Cao Cao's ships are linked to each other. We can destroy them by fire." Huang Gai then prepared about ten mengchongs and doujians (鬬艦; a type of warship) and filled them with the ingredients necessary for starting a fire. He then wrote a letter to Cao Cao, pretending that he wanted to surrender and defect to Cao Cao's side. Cao Cao told Huang Gai's messenger: "I only fear that this is a trick. However, if what Huang Gai said is true, I will reward him handsomely."

Huang Gai also prepared some zouges (走舸; a smaller type of boat), which would follow behind the mengchongs and doujians, and his small fleet sailed towards Cao Cao's base. The wind was blowing strongly from the southeast. When Huang Gai's fleet reached the middle of the river, the ships all raised their sails, and Huang Gai lifted a torch and instructed his men to shout "We surrender!" Cao Cao's troops came out of the camp to look and they said Huang Gai was coming to join them. When Huang Gai was about 20 li away from the enemy base, he ordered his men to set the ships on fire and they boarded the smaller boats behind. As the wind was very strong, the flaming ships sailed towards Cao Cao's warships at fast speed and caused them to catch fire as well. Cao Cao's ships were all burnt down and the flames also spread quickly to his camps on land. Zhou Yu then ordered an attack on Cao Cao's base and scored a major victory. Cao Cao retreated north with his surviving troops after his defeat.

Huang Gai was hit by a stray arrow during the battle and fell into the river. He was saved by Zhou Yu's men, who did not recognise him and left him on a toilet seat. When Han Dang passed by, Huang Gai managed to call out to him. Han Dang recognised Huang Gai's voice so he rushed towards him. With tears in his eyes, Han Dang helped Huang Gai remove his clothing so that the wound can be treated, and Huang Gai survived.

=== Later career and death ===
Huang Gai was promoted to General of the Household of Martial Edge (武鋒中郎將). When the tribal people in Wuling Commandery (武陵郡; around present-day Changde, Hunan) started a rebellion, Huang Gai was appointed as the Administrator of Wuling and was sent to quell the uprising. At that time, there were only 500 troops in the commandery and they were heavily outnumbered by the rebels. However, Huang Gai ordered the city gates to be opened, and when about half of the rebel army had entered, he launched an assault on them, killing hundreds of enemies while the surviving ones fled. Huang Gai later succeeded in pacifying the rebellion over the following three months by targeting the rebel chiefs and pardoning the rebels who surrendered. By summer, all the tribal chiefs had submitted to Huang Gai. Peace was restored in Wuling.

Later, when Huang Gai received news that Yiyang County was under attack by bandits, he led his forces to fight the bandits and succeeded in restoring peace in the region. Huang Gai was subsequently promoted to Lieutenant-General (偏將軍). He died in office while serving as the Administrator of Wuling Commandery.

== Huang Bing ==
In 229, after Sun Quan declared himself emperor and established the state of Eastern Wu, he granted the title of a Secondary Marquis (關內侯) to Huang Gai's son, Huang Bing (黃柄), in recognition of Huang Gai's contributions.

== Appraisal ==
Huang Gai was described as having a stern and serious appearance, and was known to be a good disciplinarian. Every time he went into battle, the men under him would compete fiercely to earn the top credit. Huang Gai was also known to be just and decisive when he handled cases in court and he never had any lapses. After his death, he was fondly remembered by the people of Wu, and they even created portraits of him and worshipped him.

== In Romance of the Three Kingdoms ==
Huang Gai is a minor character in the 14th-century historical novel Romance of the Three Kingdoms, which romanticises the historical events before and during the Three Kingdoms period. He appears mainly in the chapters covering the events leading to the Battle of Red Cliffs. His most significant moment in the novel is a fictional episode in which he proposes a "self-torture ruse" (苦肉計) to win Cao Cao's trust so that Zhou Yu's fire attack plan can be carried out. Huang Gai has a secret conversation with Zhou Yu one night and suggests his plan. The following morning, when Zhou Yu calls for an assembly of the officers to discuss their battle plans, Huang Gai pretends to openly challenge and insult Zhou Yu. Zhou Yu pretends to be furious and he orders Huang Gai to be executed, but with some intervention from Gan Ning and others, he spares Huang Gai's life and has him severely flogged. Huang Gai then writes a letter to Cao Cao, expressing his willingness to defect over to Cao Cao's side because he is unhappy with Zhou Yu. Cai Zhong and Cai He, two spies planted by Cao Cao in Zhou Yu's camp, confirm Huang Gai's account that he was flogged on Zhou Yu's order because of an argument. Kan Ze later helps to convince Cao Cao that Huang Gai's defection is genuine, even though Cao initially saw through the ruse. Huang Gai then arranges with Cao Cao that on a certain night, he would sail across the river over to Cao's camp. That night, Huang Gai uses the opportunity to launch the fire attack, sparking off the Battle of Red Cliffs.

== In popular culture ==
Huang Gai appears as a playable character in Koei's Dynasty Warriors and Warriors Orochi video game series.

He is portrayed by Liu Kui in the 2010 Chinese television series Three Kingdoms.

== See also ==
- Lists of people of the Three Kingdoms
