= Taishi Ci =

Eastern Han Dynasty general (166–206)

- 太史慈
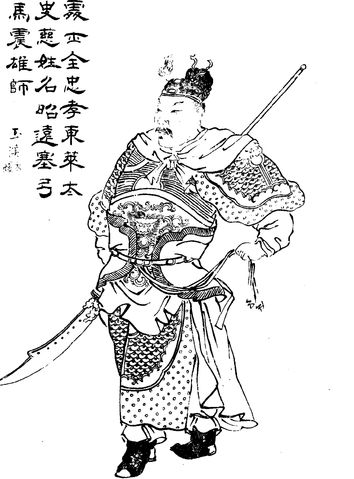
- A Qing dynasty illustration of Taishi Ci

Commandant of Jianchang (建昌都尉)
- In office ? – 206

General of the Household Who Breaks Waves (折衝中郎將)
- In office ?–?

Administrator of Danyang (丹楊太守) (self-appointed)
- In office ?–?

Personal details
- Born: 166 (Note: The Sanguozhi mentioned that Taishi Ci died in the 11th year of the Jian'an era (196–222) in the reign of Emperor Xian of Han at the age of 41 (by East Asian age reckoning). By calculation, his birth year should be around 166. See this section for the source.) Longkou, Shandong
- Died: 206 (aged 40)
- Children: Taishi Xiang
- Occupation: General
- Courtesy name: Ziyi (子義)

Taishi Ci (166–206), courtesy name Ziyi, was a Chinese military general who lived during the late Eastern Han dynasty of China. He had served as a minor Han official, before eventually coming to serve warlords Liu Yao, Sun Ce, and Sun Ce's successor Sun Quan.

A native of Donglai Commandery, he started his career as a minor official in the local commandery office. In 186, at the age of 20, he became famous after successfully completing a mission to prevent a letter from the provincial administration from reaching the imperial court in Luoyang first. However, out of fear that the provincial administration would take revenge against him, he went into hiding in Liaodong. After returning from Liaodong, he travelled to Beihai (around present-day Weifang, Shandong) to rescue the warlord Kong Rong, who was besieged by Yellow Turban rebels. By resorting to trickery, he managed to break out of the siege and seek aid from another warlord, Liu Bei. The siege was lifted when Taishi Ci returned to Beihai with reinforcements from Liu Bei. Taishi Ci travelled to Yang Province later to join the warlord Liu Yao, an old acquaintance of his. He fought for Liu Yao in the war between Liu Yao and Sun Ce, once engaging Sun Ce in a one-on-one fight. Following Liu Yao's defeat, Taishi Ci headed to Jing County (north of present-day Jing County, Anhui) and tried to establish his own power base there. However, he was eventually defeated and captured by Sun Ce's forces. Touched by Sun Ce's sincerity and generosity towards him, Taishi Ci agreed to serve Sun Ce and even helped to persuade many former followers of Liu Yao to join Sun Ce as well. Sun Ce appointed him as a Commandant and put him in charge of security around Jianchang County (present-day Fengxin County, Jiangxi). During this time, he drove back Liu Pan (劉磐) and his men, who often raided Sun Ce's territories in that area. After Sun Ce's death, Taishi Ci continued serving under Sun Ce's successor, Sun Quan. Sun Quan deeply mourned Taishi Ci when the latter died in 206.

Taishi Ci's biography in the Records of the Three Kingdoms (Sanguozhi) described him as seven chi tall (approximately 178–182 cm) and having a shiny and beautiful beard. He was famous for his archery skills. (Note: (慈長七尺七寸，美鬚髯，猨臂善射，弦不虛發。) Sanguozhi vol. 49.)

== Early career in Donglai Commandery ==
Taishi Ci was from Huang County (黃縣), Donglai Commandery (東萊郡), which is in present-day Longkou, Shandong. As a youth, he was known for being studious. He served as a zoucaoshi (奏曹史; a minor official) in the local commandery office. Around 186, (Note: Since the Sanguozhi explicitly mentioned Taishi Ci's year of death and age at death, we can deduce his year of birth to be 166 CE. The Sanguozhi stated that Taishi Ci was 21 years old (by East Asian age reckoning) when this incident occurred. Hence, we can deduce that this incident took place in around 186 CE.) the commandery administration had a dispute with their superiors, the provincial administration of Qing Province. Both sides wrote to the imperial court in the capital Luoyang to complain about each other. At the time, since the imperial court often made decisions on a first-come, first-served basis, it meant that the court would tend to rule in favour of the party whose document it received first. Since the provincial administration had already sent a courier to deliver their complaint letter, the Administrator (太守) of Donglai Commandery began to feel anxious and started looking for someone to help him deliver his letter. Taishi Ci, then 20 years old, was chosen for the task. (Note: (太史慈字子義，東萊黃人也。少好學，仕郡奏曹史。會郡與州有隙，曲直未分，以先聞者為善。時州章已去，郡守恐後之，求可使者。慈年二十一，以選行， ...) Sanguozhi vol. 49.)

When Taishi Ci finally reached Luoyang after travelling day and night, he saw the provincial administration's courier near the city gate. He approached him and asked, "Sir, are you delivering a document?" The courier replied, "Yes." Taishi Ci asked again, "Where is the document?" The courier replied, "In the carriage." Taishi Ci said, "Are you sure there is no mistake in the addressee's details on the document? Let me see it." The courier did not know that Taishi Ci was from Donglai Commandery so he showed him the letter. Taishi Ci took out a knife and destroyed the letter. The courier started shouting, "This man destroyed my document!" Taishi Ci pulled him into the carriage and said, "If you didn't show me the document, I wouldn't have been able to destroy it. Regardless of the consequences, neither of us can say he is not responsible for what happened. I suggest we remain silent and escape. By doing this, we can avoid punishment and keep our heads. Otherwise, both of us will be executed." The courier asked, "Your master sent you to destroy this document. Now that you have accomplished your mission, why do you still need to go on the run?" Taishi Ci replied, "He ordered me to only check whether the document has been delivered. However, I went too far and ended up destroying the document. If I go back, I am afraid that my master will blame me, so I suggest we escape together." The courier was persuaded by Taishi Ci so they fled from Luoyang together. (Note: (... 晨夜取道，到洛陽，詣公車門，見州吏始欲求通。慈問曰：「君欲通章邪？」吏曰：「然。」問：「章安在？」曰：「車上。」慈曰：「章題署得無誤邪？取來視之。」吏殊不知其東萊人也，因為取章。慈已先懷刀，便截敗之。吏踴躍大呼，言「人壞我章」！慈將至車間，與語曰：「向使君不以章相與，吾亦無因得敗之，是為吉凶禍福等耳，吾不獨受此罪。豈若默然俱出去，可以存易亡，無事俱就刑辟。」吏言：「君為郡敗吾章，已得如意，欲復亡為？」慈荅曰：「初受郡遣，但來視章通與未耳。吾用意太過，乃相敗章。今還，亦恐以此見譴怒，故俱欲去爾。」吏然慈言，即日俱去。) Sanguozhi vol. 49.)

After leaving Luoyang, Taishi Ci secretly returned later and delivered the commandery administration's letter to the imperial court. When the provincial administration of Qing Province found out, they sent another letter to the central government again. However, as the second letter contained some discrepancies, the imperial court ruled against the provincial administration in the dispute. Taishi Ci became famous after this incident. However, out of fear that the provincial administration would take revenge against him, he fled from Donglai Commandery and took shelter in Liaodong. (Note: (慈旣與出城，因遁還通郡章。州家聞之，更遣吏通章，有司以格章之故不復見理，州受其短。由是知名，而為州家所疾，恐受其禍，乃避之遼東。) Sanguozhi vol. 49.)

== Saving Kong Rong from the siege of Duchang ==
Kong Rong, the Chancellor (相) of Beihai State (北海國; around present-day Weifang, Shandong), heard about Taishi Ci and regarded him as an extraordinary talent. He sent his subordinates to visit Taishi Ci's mother on multiple occasions and passed her many gifts. In the late 180s or early 190s, when Beihai came under attack by Yellow Turban rebels, Kong Rong led his troops to a fortress at Duchang (都昌; in present-day Weifang, Shandong). The rebels, led by Guan Hai (管亥), besieged the Duchang fortress. After Taishi Ci returned from Liaodong, his mother told him, "You haven't met Kong Rong. He treated me very generously – almost like an old friend – while you were away. Now that he is in trouble, you should quickly go to help him." Three days later, Taishi Ci travelled alone on foot to Duchang. (Note: (北海相孔融聞而奇之，數遣人訊問其母，并致餉遺。時融以黃巾寇暴，出屯都昌，為賊管亥所圍。慈從遼東還，母謂慈曰：「汝與孔北海未嘗相見，至汝行後，贍恤殷勤，過於故舊，今為賊所圍，汝宜赴之。」慈留三日，單步徑至都昌。) Sanguozhi vol. 49.)

At the time, the rebels had yet to completely surround Duchang, so Taishi Ci managed to sneak past the enemy at night and enter the fortress to meet Kong Rong. He asked Kong Rong to let him lead soldiers to fight their way out, but Kong refused and insisted on waiting for reinforcements. The rebels came closer day by day. Kong Rong wanted to seek help from Liu Bei, the Chancellor of Pingyuan State (平原國), but no one had any idea on how to break out of the siege. Taishi Ci volunteered to fight his way out and seek reinforcements from Liu Bei, but Kong Rong said, "The rebels have completely surrounded the fortress. Everyone thinks it is impossible to break out. It will be very difficult for you to break out no matter how courageous you are." Taishi Ci replied, "When I was away, you treated my mother very generously. She feels grateful, hence she told me to help you. She knew that I know what I am doing, and that I can help you. Now, everyone says it is impossible to break out. If I were to agree with them, I will not be able to repay your kindness. Why, then, did my mother send me here for? We are in a very desperate situation. I hope you won't hesitate any longer." Kong Rong agreed to let him break out of the siege. (Note: (時圍尚未密，夜伺間隙，得入見融，因求兵出斫賊。融不聽，欲待外救。外救未有至者，而圍日偪。融欲告急平原相劉備，城中人無由得出，慈自請求行。融曰：「今賊圍甚密，衆人皆言不可，卿意雖壯，無乃實難乎？」慈對曰：「昔府君傾意於老母，老母感遇，遣慈赴府君之急，固以慈有可取，而來必有益也。今衆人言不可，慈亦言不可，豈府君愛顧之義，老母遣慈之意邪？事已急矣，願府君無疑。」融乃然之。) Sanguozhi vol. 49.)

Taishi Ci packed his equipment and had a full meal. At dawn, he brought his bow and a quiver of arrows with him, and rode out of the fortress. He was accompanied by two riders, each carrying a target stand for archery practice. When the rebels saw Taishi Ci coming out of the fortress, they immediately readied themselves for battle. To their surprise, Taishi Ci took the two stands, placed them in the ditch around the fortress, fired some arrows at them, and then returned to the fortress. The following day, he repeated the entire process. Some of the rebels stood up and prepared for battle upon seeing him, while others ignored him and remained relaxed. On the third day, when Taishi Ci came out again, the rebels thought that he was going to practise archery again, so they paid no attention to him. Taishi Ci then seized the opportunity to break out of the siege. By the time the rebels realised what was going on, Taishi Ci had already escaped and killed several rebels along the way. None of them dared to pursue him. (Note: (於是嚴行蓐食，須明，便帶鞬攝弓上馬，將兩騎自隨，各作一的持之，開門直出。外圍下左右人並驚駭，兵馬互出。慈引馬至城下塹內，植所持的各一，出射之，射之畢，徑入門。明晨復如此，圍下人或起或卧，慈復植的，射之畢，復入門。明晨復出如此，無復起者，於是下鞭馬直突圍中馳去。比賊覺知，慈行已過，又射殺數人，皆應弦而倒，故無敢追者。) Sanguozhi vol. 49.)

When Taishi Ci arrived at Pingyuan, he told Liu Bei, "I, (Taishi) Ci, am a commoner from Donglai. I am neither a relative nor an acquaintance of Kong Rong. But I have heard of him and we not only share similar beliefs, but also experienced difficult times together. Now, Guan Hai and the rebels have besieged Kong Rong; he is desperately in need of help. You are known for your kindness, righteousness, and willingness to help those in need. Kong Rong admires you and has placed his hopes in you, hence he sent me to fight my way out of the siege to seek help from you. Only you can save him." Liu Bei's facial expression turned serious and he said, "So Kong Rong knows that Liu Bei exists in this world!" He then sent 3,000 troops to follow Taishi Ci back to Duchang. When the rebels heard that reinforcements had arrived, they fled and the siege of Duchang was automatically lifted. Kong Rong regarded Taishi Ci even more highly after this event. He told Taishi Ci, "You are a young friend of mine." When Taishi Ci returned home and told his mother about it, she said, "I am very happy that you can repay Kong Rong's kindness in this way." (Note: (遂到平原，說備曰：「慈，東萊之鄙人也，與孔北海親非骨肉，比非鄉黨，特以名志相好，有分災共患之義。今管亥暴亂，北海被圍，孤窮無援，危在旦夕。以君有仁義之名，能救人之急，故北海區區，延頸恃仰，使慈冒白刃，突重圍，從萬死之中自託於君，惟君所以存之。」備斂容荅曰：「孔北海知世間有劉備邪！」即遣精兵三千人隨慈。賊聞兵至，解圍散走。融旣得濟，益奇貴慈，曰：「卿吾之少友也。」事畢，還啟其母，母曰：「我喜汝有以報孔北海也。」) Sanguozhi vol. 49.)

== Coming to serve Sun Ce ==
Liu Yao, the Inspector (刺史) of Yang Province, was not only also from Donglai Commandery like Taishi Ci, but also an old acquaintance of Taishi Ci. Taishi Ci had not met Liu Yao since his return from Liaodong, so he crossed the Yangtze River and travelled to Qu'e County (曲阿縣; present-day Danyang, Jiangsu) to find Liu Yao. Before he left, the warlord Sun Ce led his forces to attack Liu Yao's territories. Someone advised Liu Yao to appoint Taishi Ci as a general to lead his troops to counter Sun Ce, but Liu Yao said, "If I appoint Taishi Ci, Xu Zijiang will laugh at me." He then sent Taishi Ci on a reconnaissance mission to assess the strength of Sun Ce's forces. (Note: (楊州刺史劉繇與慈同郡，慈自遼東還，未與相見，暫渡江到曲阿見繇，未去，會孫策至。或勸繇可以慈為大將軍，繇曰：「我若用子義，許子將不當笑我邪？」但使慈偵視輕重。) Sanguozhi vol. 49.)

Taishi Ci, accompanied by only a single horseman, encountered Sun Ce at Shen Village (神亭; somewhere in present-day Danyang, Jiangsu) during his mission. Sun Ce had 13 other men with him, including Han Dang, Song Qian and Huang Gai. Taishi Ci rode forth and engaged Sun Ce in battle. Sun Ce thrust his spear at Taishi Ci's horse and managed to grab the handheld ji that Taishi carried on his back. Taishi Ci, on the other hand, managed to get hold of Sun Ce's helmet. Their fight was broken up when their respective subordinates showed up. (Note: (時獨與一騎卒遇策。策從騎十三，皆韓當、宋謙、黃蓋輩也。慈便前鬬，正與策對。策刺慈馬，而擥得慈項上手戟，慈亦得策兜鍪。會兩家兵騎並各來赴，於是解散。) Sanguozhi vol. 49.)

After Liu Yao was defeated by Sun Ce subsequently in battle, Taishi Ci originally planned to accompany Liu Yao as he fled to Yuzhang Commandery (豫章郡; around present-day Nanchang, Jiangxi) for shelter. However, Taishi Ci went into hiding in the hills at Wuhu County (蕪湖縣; east of present-day Wuhu, Anhui) and declared himself the Administrator (太守) of Danyang Commandery (丹楊郡). By then, Sun Ce had conquered the territories east of Xuancheng County (宣城縣; present-day Xuancheng, Anhui); only the six counties west of Jing County (涇縣; north of present-day Jing County, Anhui) remained outside of Sun Ce's control. Taishi Ci headed to Jing County, where he established a base and managed to recruit the Shanyue people to join him. Sun Ce personally led his forces to attack Taishi Ci, defeated him in battle, and captured him. Later, he released Taishi Ci from his bonds, held his hand and asked, "Do you still remember our fight at Shen Village? What would you do if you captured me?" Taishi Ci replied, "I can't be certain about this." Sun Ce laughed and said, "I shall manage the present-day affairs of the state together with you from this moment onwards." (Note: (慈當與繇俱奔豫章，而遁於蕪湖，亡入山中，稱丹楊太守。是時，策已平定宣城以東，惟涇以西六縣未服。慈因進住涇縣，立屯府，大為山越所附。策躬自攻討，遂見囚執。策即解縛，捉其手曰：「寧識神亭時邪？若卿爾時得我云何？」慈曰：「未可量也。」策大笑曰：「今日之事，當與卿共之。」) Sanguozhi vol. 49.)

Sun Ce asked Taishi Ci, "In the past, you helped your commandery's administrator destroy a letter from the provincial administration, saved Wenju (Kong Rong) from danger, and successfully obtained reinforcements from Xuande (Liu Bei). These are all acts of heroism. You are one of the most intelligent people in this world, yet you haven't found someone who appreciates your talent. The ancients could forget about she gou zhan qu. (Note: The she gou (射鈎; lit. "fire an arrow at a (dai)gou") refers to the incident when Guan Zhong fired an arrow at Duke Huan of Qi, intending to kill him, but the arrow hit a daigou (帶鈎; an ornamental piece) that the duke was wearing. Later, the duke pardoned Guan Zhong and even appointed him as the chancellor. The zhan qu (斬袪; lit. "cut sleeve") refers to the incident when Duke Xian of Jin sent an assassin, Pi (披), to kill the future Duke Wen of Jin. Duke Wen escaped, but Pi managed to cut off part of the duke's sleeve. After Duke Wen came to power, he pardoned Pi. By mentioning these two examples, Sun Ce was hinting to Taishi Ci that he, too, was willing to be like Duke Huan and Duke Wen, and forget that he and Taishi Ci used to be enemies.) I am someone who appreciates you. You don't need to worry that you will feel unhappy if you join me." Sun Ce also said, "If a dragon wishes to soar into the sky, it has to take off from a piece of wood." (Note: Sun Ce was alluding to a line from the classic text Lunheng written by Wang Chong. The line said that a dragon has to take off from a piece of wood before it can soar into the sky. (短書言:「龍無尺木,無以升天。」) He was essentially hinting that Taishi Ci's past experiences were like the piece of wood, or a "takeoff platform" of sorts.) (Note: (江表傳曰：策問慈曰：「聞卿昔為太守劫州章，赴文舉，詣玄德，皆有烈義，天下智士也，但所託未得其人耳。射鈎斬袪，古人不嫌。孤是卿知己，勿憂不如意也。」出教曰：「龍欲騰翥，先階尺木者也。」) Jiang Biao Zhuan annotation in Sanguozhi vol. 49.)

=== Alternative account in the Wu Li ===
The Wu Li (吳歷) provided a different account of how Taishi Ci came to serve Sun Ce. It mentioned that Taishi Ci was defeated and captured by Sun Ce after their fight at Shen Village. Sun Ce had heard of Taishi Ci before so he released Taishi Ci from his bonds and asked him for advice on his future conquests. Taishi Ci replied, "I am an officer of a defeated army. I am not qualified to speak on such matters." Sun Ce said, "In the past, Han Xin heeded advice from Guangwu. In the present, I seek advice from a man of righteousness. What are you talking about?" Taishi Ci replied, "My army has recently been defeated. The troops are scattered and low on morale. It may be difficult, but I still intend to gather and bring them together. I am afraid this is not what you wish to see." Sun Ce knelt down and said, "What I want is your sincerity. I hope you will return by midday tomorrow." When Sun Ce's subordinates raised doubts about Taishi Ci's loyalty, Sun Ce said, "Taishi Ziyi is a famous man from Qing Province. He is known for keeping his promises. I believe he will not deceive me." The following day, Sun Ce hosted a banquet and had a pole erected in the middle, so as to keep track of time by observing its shadow. By midday, when the shadow was shortest, Taishi Ci returned as promised. Sun Ce was overjoyed. He often consulted Taishi Ci on military affairs later on. (Note: (吳歷云：慈於神亭戰敗，為策所執。策素聞其名，即解縛請見，咨問進取之術。慈荅曰：「破軍之將，不足與論事。」策曰：「昔韓信定計於廣武，今策決疑於仁者，君何辭焉？」慈曰：「州軍新破，士卒離心，若儻分散，難復合聚；欲出宣恩安集，恐不合尊意。」策長跪荅曰：「誠本心所望也。明日中，望君來還。」諸將皆疑，策曰：「太史子義，青州名士，以信義為先，終不欺策。」明日，大請諸將，豫設酒食，立竿視影。日中而慈至，策大恱，常與參論諸軍事。) Wu Li annotation in Sanguozhi vol. 49.)

Pei Songzhi, who added the Wu Li account as an annotation to Taishi Ci's biography in the Sanguozhi, noted that the Wu Li account deviated significantly from what was recorded in Taishi Ci's Sanguozhi biography. He suspected that there was a mistake. (Note: (臣松之案；吳歷云慈於神亭戰敗，為策所得，與本傳大異，疑為謬誤。) Pei Songzhi's annotation in Sanguozhi vol. 49.)

== Persuading Liu Yao's followers to surrender to Sun Ce ==
After returning to his base in Wu Commandery (around present-day Suzhou, Jiangsu), Sun Ce commissioned Taishi Ci as a "General of the Household Who Breaks Waves" (折衝中郎將). Although Liu Yao had already died in Yuzhang Commandery (豫章郡; around present-day Nanchang, Jiangxi) in 198, there were still thousands of his former followers scattered around the area. Sun Ce sent Taishi Ci to persuade them to surrender. (Note: (即署門下督，還吳授兵，拜折衝中郎將。後劉繇亡於豫章，士衆萬餘人未有所附，策命慈往撫安焉。) Sanguozhi vol. 49.)

Sun Ce told Taishi Ci, "In the past, when Liu Yao criticised me for helping Yuan Shu conquer Lujiang, he didn't have good intentions and his reasons were not convincing. Why? Yuan Shu had control over the thousands of troops which used to be under my father's command. I wanted to make great achievements, so I had no choice but to submit to Yuan Shu and ask him to give me control of my father's troops. Even then, he only gave me back about 1,000 men. When he ordered me to attack Lujiang, the circumstances I was in were so desperate that I had no choice but to obey him. Later on, he turned evil and wanted to commit treacherous acts. I tried to dissuade him but he wouldn't listen. That was when I decided to sever ties with him. My relationship with Yuan Shu is only up to this extent. Now that Liu Yao is dead, there is no chance for me to explain to him anymore. However, his son still lives in Yuzhang. I don't know how Hua Ziyu treats him, and whether Liu Yao's former followers have decided to serve Hua Ziyu. You are from the same commandery as Liu Yao, and you served under him before. I hope you can visit his son and convey my wishes to his followers. If they wish to join me, I will welcome them; if they don't, do treat them kindly. At the same time, you can assess how strong Hua Ziyu's defences are, and see if the peoples of Luling and Poyang are willing to join me. You can bring along as many men as you wish." Taishi Ci replied, "I have committed unpardonable acts. Yet, you treat me as generously as how Duke Huan of Qi and Duke Wen of Jin treated former enemies who surrendered to them. The ancients lived by a code of loyalty until death. I don't need too many men to accompany me. Just a dozen or so will be sufficient." (Note: (江表傳曰：策謂慈曰：「劉牧往責吾為袁氏攻廬江，其意頗猥，理恕不足。何者？先君手下兵數千餘人，盡在公路許。孤志在立事，不得不屈意於公路，求索故兵，再往纔得千餘人耳。仍令孤攻廬江，爾時事勢，不得不為行。但其後不遵臣節，自棄作邪僭事，諫之不從。丈夫義交，苟有大故，不得不離，孤交求公路及絕之本末如此。今劉繇喪亡，恨不及其生時與共論辯。今兒子在豫章，不知華子魚待遇何如，其故部曲復依隨之否？卿則州人，昔又從事，寧能往視其兒子，並宣孤意於其部曲？部曲樂來者便與俱來，不樂來者且安慰之。并觀察子魚所以牧禦方規何似，視廬陵、鄱陽人民親附之否？卿手下兵，宜將多少，自由意。」慈對曰：「慈有不赦之罪，將軍量同桓、文，待遇過望。古人報生以死，期於盡節，沒而後已。今並息兵，兵不宜多，將數十人，自足以往還也。」) Jiang Biao Zhuan annotation in Sanguozhi vol. 49.)

Sun Ce's aides cautioned him, "(Taishi) Ci will not come back if he leaves." However, Sun Ce said, "If Ziyi abandons me, who else can he turn to?" He personally saw Taishi Ci off, held his hand and asked, "When will you return?" Taishi Ci replied, "Not more than 60 days." He kept his word and returned within 60 days. (Note: (左右皆曰：「慈必北去不還。」策曰：「子義捨我，當復與誰？」餞送昌門，把腕別曰：「何時能還？」荅曰：「不過六十日。」果如期而反。) Sanguozhi vol. 49.)

When Sun Ce sent Taishi Ci to persuade Liu Yao's followers to surrender, many of Sun Ce's aides felt that Taishi Ci could not be trusted. They believed that Taishi Ci would defect to either Hua Xin or Huang Zu. However, Sun Ce said, "All of you are wrong. I trust my judgment. Taishi Ci may be brave and headstrong, but he is not an impulsive person. He is a man of exemplary character and a man who keeps his word. I treat him like a close friend and will not betray him. All of you don't need to worry." Sun Ce's aides only trusted Taishi Ci after he kept his promise and returned from Yuzhang Commandery. When Taishi Ci met Sun Ce again, he said, "Hua Ziyu is a man of virtue, but not a talented leader. He has no grand plan; he only wants to preserve the status quo. Tong Zhi (僮芝) from Danyang lied that he has been appointed as the Administrator of Luling and has taken control of the commandery. The local clans in Poyang have formed their own ruling body and driven away the officials sent by Hua Ziyu to govern the area. Hua Ziyu is unable to control Luling and Poyang. Moreover, about 5,000 to 6,000 local clans in Haihun (海昏) have formed their own ruling body too and rejected control by the commandery administration. Hua Ziyu can do nothing about this." Sun Ce clapped his hands and laughed. Later on, he pacified Yuzhang Commandery and successfully induced Hua Xin to surrender to him. (Note: (江表傳曰：策初遣慈，議者紛紜，謂慈未可信，或云與華子魚州里，恐留彼為籌策，或疑慈西託黃祖，假路還北，多言遣之非計。策曰：「諸君語皆非也，孤斷之詳矣。太史子義雖氣勇有膽烈，然非縱橫之人。其心有士謨，志經道義，貴重然諾，一以意許知己，死亡不相負，諸君勿復憂也。」慈從豫章還，議者乃始服。慈見策曰：「華子魚良德也，然非籌略才，無他方規，自守而已。又丹楊僮芝自擅廬陵，詐言被詔書為太守。鄱陽民帥別立宗部，阻兵守界，不受子魚所遣長吏，言『我以別立郡，須漢遣真太守來，當迎之耳』。子魚不但不能諧廬陵、鄱陽，近自海昏有上繚壁，有五六千家相結聚作宗伍，惟輸租布於郡耳，發召一人遂不可得，子魚亦覩視之而已。」策拊掌大笑，乃有兼并之志矣。頃之，遂定豫章。) Jiang Biao Zhuan annotation in Sanguozhi vol. 49.)

== Service under the Sun family ==
Liu Pan (劉磐), a nephew of Jing Province's governor Liu Biao, often led his troops to raid Sun Ce's territories in Ai County (艾縣; west of present-day Xiushui County, Jiangxi), Xi'an County (西安縣; present-day Putian District, Wuning County, Jiangxi) and the nearby counties. Sun Ce created a commandery composed of Haihun County (海昏縣; present-day Xiangshan Town, Xinjian District, Nanchang, Jiangxi), Jianchang County (建昌縣; present-day Fengxin County, Jiangxi) and six other counties, and appointed Taishi Ci as its Commandant (都尉), with the administrative centre at Haihun County. Taishi Ci led troops from these counties to drive back Liu Pan. Liu Pan stopped his raids after that. (Note: (劉表從子磐，驍勇，數為寇於艾、西安諸縣。策於是分海昏、建昌左右六縣，以慈為建昌都尉，治海昏，并督諸將拒磐。磐絕跡不復為寇。) Sanguozhi vol. 49.)

Taishi Ci was famous for his archery skills. One notable incident, detailed in the Sanguozhi, was when he accompanied Sun Ce to attack rebels in Mabao (麻保). The rebel leader stood at the viewing platform above the gate, with his hand resting against a wooden pillar, and hurled verbal abuse at Sun Ce. Taishi Ci took aim and fired an arrow at him. The arrow pierced through both the pillar and the rebel's hand. Everyone was awed by Taishi Ci's skill. When the warlord Cao Cao heard about Taishi Ci, he wrote a letter to him and put it inside a box containing a few pieces of danggui. (Note: (嘗從策討麻保賊，賊於屯裏緣樓上行詈，以手持樓棼，慈引弓射之，矢貫手着棼，圍外萬人莫不稱善。其妙如此。曹公聞其名，遺慈書，以篋封之，發省無所道，而但貯當歸。) Sanguozhi vol. 49.) (Note: Danggui (當歸) literally means "ought to return" or "should return". Cao Cao was hinting to Taishi Ci that he should leave Sun Ce and come to serve him.)

Sun Ce died in 200 CE and was succeeded by his younger brother, Sun Quan. When Sun Quan came to power, he continued to put Taishi Ci in charge of security in the areas around Haihun County because he knew that Taishi Ci was capable of deterring Liu Pan. (Note: (孫權統事，以慈能制磐，遂委南方之事。) Sanguozhi vol. 49.)

== Death ==
Taishi Ci died in 206 at the age of 41 (by East Asian age reckoning). (Note: (年四十一，建安十一年卒。) Sanguozhi vol. 49.) Before his death, he sighed and said, "A man living in this world should aspire to carry a seven chi-long sword and rise to the position of a Son of Heaven. Now, I have yet to realise my ambition. How unfortunate that I am going to die soon!" Sun Quan deeply mourned Taishi Ci's death. (Note: (吳書曰：慈臨亡，歎息曰：「丈夫生世，當帶七尺之劒，以升天子之階。今所志未從，柰何而死乎！」權甚悼惜之。) Wu Shu annotation in Sanguozhi vol. 49.)

== Family ==
Taishi Ci had a son, Taishi Xiang (太史享), whose courtesy name was "Yuanfu" (元復). Taishi Xiang served in Eastern Wu and held the appointments of Colonel of Yue Cavalry (越騎校尉), Imperial Secretary (尚書), and Administrator (太守) of Wu Commandery. (Note: (子享，官至越騎校尉。) Sanguozhi vol. 49.) (Note: (吳書曰：享字元復，歷尚書、吳郡太守。) Wu Shu annotation in Sanguozhi vol. 49.)

== Appraisal ==
Chen Shou, who wrote Taishi Ci's biography in the Sanguozhi, commented on Taishi Ci as follows: "Taishi Ci was loyal, righteous, trustworthy and upright. He possessed traits of ancient sages."

== In Romance of the Three Kingdoms ==
Taishi Ci appears as a character in the 14th century historical novel Romance of the Three Kingdoms by Luo Guanzhong. His death was exaggerated for dramatic effect in Chapter 53 of the novel's version of the Battle of Hefei (208).

== In popular culture ==
Taishi Ci is featured as a playable character in the video game series Romance of the Three Kingdoms, Dynasty Warriors and Warriors Orochi by Koei.

Taishi Ci appears in the 2007 anime Kōtetsu Sangokushi, which is loosely based on Romance of the Three Kingdoms, as a general of the "barbaric" Go (Wu) faction. The character Taishiji Shigi of the anime series Ikki Tousen is also based roughly on Taishi Ci.

Taishi Ci is a playable character in Total War: Three Kingdoms, being a part of various factions depending on the campaign.

== See also ==
- Lists of people of the Three Kingdoms
