= Zhou Tai =

General serving warlord Sun Quan (died c.223)

- 周泰
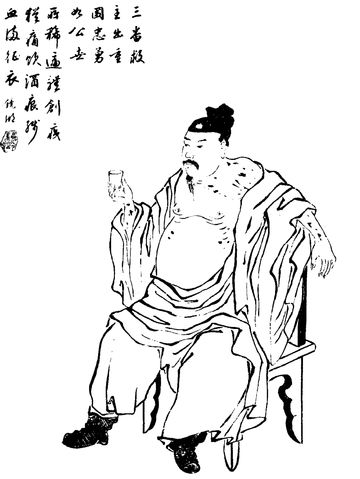
- Qing dynasty illustration of Zhou Tai

General of Vehement Might (奮威將軍)
- In office 219 – ?

Administrator of Hanzhong (漢中太守) (nominal)
- In office 219 – ?

General Who Pacifies Barbarians (平虜將軍)
- In office 217 – 219

Personal details
- Born: Unknown; Fengtai County, Anhui
- Died: c. 223 (Note: The Sanguozhi recorded that Zhou Tai died sometime during the Huangwu era (222-229) of Sun Quan's reign.)
- Children: Zhou Shao; Zhou Cheng
- Occupation: General
- Courtesy name: Youping (幼平)
- Peerage: Marquis of Lingyang (陵陽侯)

Zhou Tai (died c. 223), courtesy name Youping, was a military general serving under the warlord Sun Quan during the late Eastern Han dynasty and early Three Kingdoms period of China. He previously served under Sun Ce, Sun Quan's elder brother and predecessor.

== Service under Sun Ce ==
Zhou Tai was from Xiacai County (下蔡縣), Jiujiang Commandery (九江郡), which is present-day Fengtai County, Anhui. Around the early 195, he and Jiang Qin came to serve Sun Ce, who was on a series of conquests in the Jiangdong region, where Zhou Tai helped Sun Ce to defeat Liu Yao and Wu Ju in this campaign. When Sun Ce occupied Kuaiji Commandery (present-day Shaoxing, Zhejiang) after the commandery's Administrator, Wang Lang, surrendered to him, he appointed Zhou Tai as a Major of Separate Command (別部司馬) and put him in command of some troops.

Sun Ce's younger brother, Sun Quan, favoured Zhou Tai so he requested for Zhou to be transferred to his unit. Once, when Sun Ce was away on a campaign against some bandits who had emerged in the six counties of Kuaiji, Sun Quan was left in Xuancheng County (宣城縣; present-day Xuancheng, Anhui) with less than 1,000 men. Out of negligence, Sun Quan did not set up defence posts, so when thousands of bandits suddenly attacked Xuancheng, he attempted to flee. However, by then, Sun Quan had already been surrounded by the bandits, who attacked him and slashed at his saddle, causing much panic among his men. Only Zhou Tai, with his spirits roused, rushed to protect Sun Quan, emboldening those near him and making them able to fight again. When the bandits finally dispersed, Zhou Tai had sustained 12 deep wounds all over his body and he took a long time to recover.

In 199, Zhou Tai followed Sun Ce to attack Liu Xun at Wan County (皖縣; present-day Qianshan County, Anhui) and Huang Zu at Jiangxia Commandery (江夏郡; commandery capital in present-day Xinzhou District, Wuhan, Hubei). When he returned from the campaigns, he passed by Yuzhang Commandery (豫章郡) and was appointed as the Chief (長) of Yichun County (宜春縣; present-day Yichun, Jiangxi). The residents in the counties under his governorship provided him with the necessary funding and supplies for his troops.

== Service under Sun Quan ==
Sun Ce was assassinated in 200 CE while he was out on a hunting expedition and was succeeded by Sun Quan. In 208, Zhou Tai participated in the Battle of Jiangxia against Huang Zu. Later that year, Zhou Tai fought at the Battle of Red Cliffs under the command of Zhou Yu and Cheng Pu, and the allied forces of Sun Quan and Liu Bei scored a major victory over Cao Cao's forces. Zhou Tai was also involved in the Battle of Jiangling, a follow-up to Red Cliffs, and Sun Quan's forces defeated Cao Cao's general Cao Ren and captured Nan Commandery (南郡; around present-day Jingzhou, Hubei). After the battles, Zhou Tai was ordered to garrison at Cen County (岑縣).

In 217, Cao Cao launched another attack on Sun Quan, leading to the Battle of Ruxu. Zhou Tai participated in the defence of Ruxu, and Sun Quan's forces succeeded in driving back the invaders. After Cao Cao's retreat, Zhou Tai was appointed General Who Pacifies Barbarians (平虜將軍) and was ordered to remain behind to guard Ruxu. At the time, Zhu Ran and Xu Sheng were also stationed at Ruxu and were Zhou Tai's subordinates, but they were reluctant to submit to Zhou's command. Sun Quan made a special trip to Ruxu and he threw a party for all the military officers there. Sun Quan personally served wine to Zhou Tai and asked him to undress. He pointed at every scar on Zhou Tai's body and asked Zhou about it, whereupon Zhou would relate stories of the battles he fought in. At the end, Sun Quan told Zhou Tai to put on his clothes and they revelled through the night. The following day, Sun Quan instructed a herald to grant Zhou Tai his imperial parasol.

The Jiang Biao Zhuan (江表傳) further described this incident as follows:

Sun Quan held [Zhou Tai's] arm and tears crossed his face. He called Zhou Tai by his courtesy name, saying, "Youping, you've fought like bears and tigers for me and my brother. You were willing to lay down your life and you've sustained wounds all over your body. [The scars] appear as though they have been etched into your skin. How can I not treat you like a brother, and not grant you any military appointments? You've rendered meritorious service to Wu, and I'll stand by you whether in honour or shame, and I'll share joy and sorrow with you. Youping, be merry. Don't be disheartened by the fact that you come from a humble background." Sun Quan then bestowed an imperial silk parasol of blue veils upon Zhou Tai. After all was over, he asked Zhou Tai to lead him out of Ruxu, with the sounds of drums and horns in the background.

Zhu Ran, Xu Sheng and the other officers were impressed with Zhou Tai and they submitted to his command.

In 219, Sun Quan sent his general Lü Meng to invade and seize Liu Bei's territories in Jing Province, which were defended by Guan Yu. After the success of the invasion, Sun Quan planned to attack Liu Bei in Shu (covering present-day Sichuan and Chongqing) so he appointed Zhou Tai as the Administrator (太守) of Hanzhong Commandery even though Hanzhong was still under Liu Bei's control then. He also appointed Zhou Tai as General of Vehement Might (奮威將軍) and awarded him the title "Marquis of Lingyang" (陵陽侯).

== Death ==
Zhou Tai died sometime during the Huangwu era (222–229) in Sun Quan's reign. His year of death was not specified, but the Australian sinologist Rafe de Crespigny estimated it to be around 223.

== Descendant ==
Zhou Tai's son, Zhou Shao (周邵), was appointed as a Cavalry Commandant (騎都尉) and commanded some troops. He fought in the Battle of Ruxu of 222–223 against the Wei general Cao Ren and made contributions in battle. Later in 228, he participated in the Battle of Shiting under Lu Xun's command, which saw a victory for Wu forces over the Wei army led by Cao Xiu. Zhou Shao was promoted to Major-General (裨將軍) for his achievement. He died in 230 and was succeeded by his younger brother, Zhou Cheng (周承), who inherited his military appointment and their father's marquis title.

== Appraisal ==
Zhou Tai was noted to be faithful and polite.

Zhou Tai's bravery saving Sun Quan during the bandits' attack on Xuancheng was greatly appreciated by Sun Ce, who appointed him as the Chief (長) of Chungu County (春穀縣; northwest of present-day Fanchang County, Anhui). This made Sun Quan remind his generals about Zhou Tai's personal deeds saving Sun Quan's life.

Zhou Tai was praised by Chen Shou as one of the "twelve tiger minister of Jiangdong" (江東十二虎臣). The appraisal of courage and strength of Zhou Tai was also given by Lu Ji.

== In popular culture ==
Zhou Tai appears as a playable character in Koei's Dynasty Warriors and Warriors Orochi video game series.

Zhou Tai appears in Total War: Three Kingdoms, serving under Sun Ce in 200.

== See also ==
- Lists of people of the Three Kingdoms

== Appendix ==
=== Bibliography ===
- Chen, Shou (3rd century). Records of the Three Kingdoms (Sanguozhi).
- de Crespigny, Rafe (2007). A Biographical Dictionary of Later Han to the Three Kingdoms 23-220 AD. Leiden: Brill. ISBN 9789004156050.
- Pei, Songzhi (5th century). Annotated Records of the Three Kingdoms (Sanguozhi zhu).
