= Han Dang =

Chinese military general (died 227)

- 韓當

Administrator and Area Commander of Guanjun (冠軍太守兼都督)
- In office 223 – 227

General of Vehement Might (威烈將軍)
- In office 222 – 223

Administrator of Yongchang (永昌太守)
- In office 219 – 222

Personal details
- Born: Unknown; Qian'an, Hebei
- Died: 227 (Note: The Zizhi Tongjian recorded that Han Dang died in 227.)
- Children: Han Zong
- Occupation: General
- Courtesy name: Yigong (義公)
- Peerage: Marquis of Shicheng (石城侯)

Han Dang (died 227), courtesy name Yigong, was a military general serving under the warlord Sun Quan during the late Eastern Han dynasty and early Three Kingdoms period of China. He previously served under Sun Quan's predecessors – Sun Jian (Sun Quan's father) and Sun Ce (Sun Quan's elder brother).

== Life ==
Han Dang was from Lingzhi County (令支縣), Liaoxi Commandery (遼西郡), which is in present-day Qian'an, Hebei. He possessed great physical strength and was highly skilled in archery and horse riding. The warlord Sun Jian recognised his abilities and recruited him. Han Dang accompanied Sun Jian on his military exploits throughout the 180s until 191, from the Yellow Turban Rebellion to the campaign against Dong Zhuo. He was hardworking and made many contributions in battle. However, even though he was serving in an army, he was actually more of a youxia or mercenary, so he was not awarded any titles for his achievements. He remained as a Major of Separate Command (別部司馬) under Sun Jian.

After Sun Jian's death in 191, Han Dang continued serving under Sun Jian's eldest son, Sun Ce. He accompanied Sun Ce on his conquests in the Jiangdong (or Wu) region. The captured territories later served as the foundation of the state of Eastern Wu. Han Dang was promoted to Colonel Who is First to Ascend (先登校尉) and given 2,000 troops under his command and 50 horses. In 200, Han Dang pledged allegiance to Sun Ce's younger brother, Sun Quan, after Sun Ce was assassinated in a hunting expedition. He participated in the battle against a minor warlord Liu Xun, the Battle of Jiangxia, and the campaign at Poyang (鄱陽). He was later appointed as the Chief (長) of Le'an County (樂安縣; northeast of present-day Dexing, Jiangxi). The Shanyue – tribal peoples in the Wu territories – were afraid of him and submitted to his administration.

Han Dang participated in various battles and campaigns during his service under Sun Quan. In the winter of 208–209, he fought against Cao Cao's forces under the command of Zhou Yu at the Battle of Red Cliffs. In 219, he joined Lü Meng in the successful invasion of Jing Province, which resulted in Sun Quan seizing all territories in the province which used to be under Liu Bei's control. Han Dang was promoted to Lieutenant-General (偏將軍) and appointed as the Administrator (太守) of Yongchang Commandery (永昌郡). Between 221 and 222, Liu Bei launched a campaign against Sun Quan to retake Jing Province, leading to the Battle of Xiaoting. Han Dang fought in the battle and he, together with Lu Xun, Zhu Ran and others, scored a major victory over Liu Bei. For his contributions, Han Dang was further promoted to General of Vehement Might (威烈將軍) and received the title of a Marquis of a Chief Village (都亭侯). In 223, Han Dang participated in the Battle of Jiangling and resisted the Wei forces led by Cao Zhen.

In 223, Han Dang was granted the title "Marquis of Shicheng" (石城侯), promoted to General of Illustrious Martial Might (昭武將軍), and appointed as the Administrator of Guanjun Commandery (冠軍郡). He was later given an additional appointment of Area Commander (都督) to oversee the military affairs in his jurisdiction. When some bandits caused trouble in Danyang Commandery (丹楊郡), Han Dang led 10,000 elite troops to attack the bandits and defeated them.

Han Dang died in 227, about two years before Sun Quan officially declared himself emperor and established the state of Eastern Wu.

== Family ==
Han Dang's title and military command were passed on to his son, Han Zong (韓綜). In 227, when Sun Quan was attacking Shiyang (石陽), he did not bring Han Zong along because he feared that Han would cause trouble. Han Zong was stationed at Wuchang (武昌; present-day Ezhou, Hubei) then, and he behaved badly and abused his authority. Sun Quan did not pursue the matter in consideration of the meritorious service of Han Zong's late father.

Han Zong wanted to rebel against Sun Quan but he feared that his subordinates would not agree. He told lies and forced his sisters and female relatives to marry his subordinates and gave his servants to his close aides to gain their trust and support. In January or February 228, he fled to the state of Cao Wei, bringing along his deceased father's body, family members and followers, numbering more than 1,000 people in total. Han Zong became a general in Wei and was enfeoffed as the Marquis of Guangyang. He often led Wei soldiers to raid the Wu border, killing many civilians. Sun Quan was very angry with Han Zong.

In early 253, Han Zong served as the vanguard of the Wei army during the Battle of Dongxing, fought between Wei and Wu. He was defeated and killed in battle. The Wu commander Zhuge Ke had Han Zong's body decapitated and sent Han's head to Sun Quan's temple as a propitiation, because Sun Quan – who died eight months before the battle – hated Han Zong when he was still alive.

== Appraisal ==
Han Dang was known to be a good military commander who often encouraged his men to be united in spirit. He also respected his superiors and adhered to rules and regulations faithfully. Sun Quan was very pleased with him.

== In popular culture ==
Han Dang is first introduced as a playable character in the eighth instalment of Koei's Dynasty Warriors video game series.

He is portrayed by Liu Jun in the 2010 Chinese television series Three Kingdoms.

He appears in Total War: Three Kingdoms, serving under various factions.

== See also ==
- Lists of people of the Three Kingdoms
