= Shanyue =

Conglomeration of upland Yue tribes

The Shanyue (山越) were an ancient conglomeration of upland Yue hill tribes living in what is today the mountainous regions of Southern China and Northern Vietnam during the Han dynasty. Since the Southern part of modern China prior to the Qin conquest was not yet controlled by the Han dynasty. As the Han imperial court only claimed ownership of the territories of the southern portions, the empire lacked the military means to realistically control and subdue them prior the southward expansion. To ensure a sustainable source of livelihood to support their survival, the Shanyue would regularly conduct sneak attacks and perform rebellions against any unfortunate Han Chinese wanderer that crossed paths with them by lurking around their domains to loot and gather rudimentary living essentials. At the time of the Eastern Han dynasty, the Shanyue tribe became a major geopolitical impetus and by the end of the Eastern Han dynasty, the Shanyue tribes were subsumed into Han Empire after the Sun family established a strong local government in Jiangdong.

The Kingdom of Wu, founded by Sun Quan, launched numerous campaigns against the Shanyue, but to no avail because the tribesmen of Shanyue had lived in the hills for generations and knew the area well, and would strategically retreat by going into hiding once they lost a battle. However, one of the Wu generals, Ling Tong, attempted a different military approach to deal with the Shanyue tribes, he proposed that Sun Quan should attempt to win the hearts and minds of the Shanyue peoples and assimilate them through persuasive rhetoric, crafty guile, deceit and peaceful means instead of purely using military force to hamper and subdue them. Ling reasoned that if they could impress the Shanyue with Wu's and Chinese clemency, compassion, and dignity and potential rewards, the Shanyue tribesmen would submit to their government without bloodshed. After he was granted the authority to request material from counties when required, Ling led a unit with decorative weapons and armors to go deep into the hills. When the Shanyue discovered Wu troops, they were impressed by Ling's contingent; then Ling emerged and told them that if they would join the Wu forces, handsome rewards would be offered to sway the Shanyue's loyalty. Tens of thousands of the Shanyue complied by coming out from their caverns and joined Ling. Ling selected 10,000 strong men to form a unit, and returned. Because of Ling Tong’s diplomatic success, Zhuge Ke, another Wu general and future regent, would adopt his strategy. In 203, the Shanyue rebelled against Sun Quan's rule and were defeated by the generals Lü Fan, Cheng Pu, and Taishi Ci. In 217, Sun Quan appointed Lu Xun supreme commander of an army to suppress martial activities orchestrated by the Shanyue in Guiji (modern-day Shaoxing). In 234 AD, Ke proposed to Sun Quan that the Shanyue of Danyang could be subdued, and he just needed full governing powers to set his plan in motion. Zhuge's requests were granted, and upon Zhuge's arrival, he requested the four neighboring commanderies to seal their borders and not combat the Shanyue; then, when the rice became ready for harvest, he had the rice harvested quickly and then safely gathered up, away from the imperilment of the potential threat posed by the pilfering Shanyue. The result of the strategic maneuvers crippled the Shanyue from being able to regularly stage their random sneak attacks and pillaging rampages against unfortunate Chinese wanderers at will. Consequently, the Shanyue, deprived of food supplies were thus starved into submission as their previous tactics involving the gathered food by plundering any unfortunate Han wanderer that came across their path instead of planting it themselves ultimately left them hamstrung upon their submission to the Chinese. As soon as the subdued Shanyue submitted, Zhuge Ke under his outwardly generous façade of charitable demeanor treated them with benevolence. The military operation ran for approximately three to four years, with virtually all the Shanyue tribes within Dangyang having surrendered to the Kingdom of Wu, indicative of their final acquiescence to have their eventual fates to be assimilated into the Han empire.

In the year 234, subsequent to the designation of Zhuge Ke as the governor of Danyang, Ke discarded his outwardly magnanimous pose of compassion and noble posture of benevolence by embarking on a campaign to forcibly remove the Shanyue population from the region presently known as Southern China, thus initiating a process of brutal ethnic cleansing during his early tenure in office. Ke strategically engineered and ruthlessly executed the systematic destruction of their settlements in order to starve them into submission. The Three Kingdom's immense imperial military power coupled with its vast strategic intensification of internal Han Chinese migratory pressures ultimately led to their eventual demographic displacement and territorial dispossession. Captured Shanyue tribesmen were either driven out to the coastal extremities such as the river valleys and highland areas where they eventually became marginal scavengers and outcasts or recruited in the Imperial Chinese army during its imperial military excursions. The remaining Shanyue tribes who cooperated with the Han imperial military authorities in the lowlands would go on to become tenant farmers on the agricultural settlements administered and presided by Han Chinese landlords.

== See also ==
- Âu Lạc
- Baiyue
- Dong'ou Kingdom
- Lạc Việt
- Minyue
- Nam Việt
- Xirong
