= Liu Xun (warlord) =

2nd-century Chinese general and warlord

- 劉勛

General Who Attacks Barbarians (征虜將軍) (under Cao Cao)
- In office 199 – ?
- Monarch: Emperor Xian of Han

Administrator of Lujiang (盧江太守) (under Yuan Shu)
- In office 194 – ?
- Monarch: Emperor Xian of Han
- Preceded by: Lu Kang

Personal details
- Born: Unknown
- Died: Unknown
- Spouses: Wang Song; Lady Sima
- Relatives: at least one brother; Liu Wei (nephew)
- Occupation: General, warlord
- Courtesy name: Zitai (子台)

Liu Xun (fl. 180s–190s), courtesy name Zitai, was a military general and minor warlord who lived during the late Eastern Han dynasty of China.

== Life ==
Liu Xun was from Langya Commandery (琅邪郡), which is around present-day Linyi, Shandong. Sometime towards the end of the Zhongping era (184–189) of Emperor Ling's reign, he served as the Chief (長) of Jianping County (建平縣; southwest of present-day Xiayi County, Henan) in Pei State (沛國). During this time, he met and became an acquaintance of Cao Cao.

Liu Xun later served as a military general under the warlord Yuan Shu. In 194, Yuan Shu ordered Sun Ce, then serving under him, to lead troops to attack Lujiang Commandery (廬江郡; around present-day Lu'an, Anhui) and seize it from its Administrator (太守), Lu Kang. Although Yuan Shu had promised Sun Ce earlier that he would appoint him as the new Administrator, he broke his promise and appointed Liu Xun as the Administrator after Sun Ce conquered the commandery for him.

In 197, Yuan Shu declared himself emperor of Zhong state (仲国) – an act seen as treason against the figurehead Emperor Xian of the Eastern Han dynasty – and soon came under attack by various warlords such as Cao Cao, Lü Bu and even his former ally Sun Ce. After Yuan Shu's downfall and death in c.July 199, his relative Yuan Yin (袁胤) and other surviving members of the Yuan family fled to Wan (皖; or Wancheng 皖城; present-day Qianshan County, Anhui) in Lujiang Commandery and took shelter under Liu Xun.

Around 199, Liu Xun had become a minor warlord in the Southern Huai River region with a sizeable army under his command. Sun Ce, who had conquered territories in the Jiangdong region after leaving Yuan Shu, planned to seize control of Lujiang Commandery from Liu Xun. He sent a messenger to meet Liu Xun and seek his assistance in attacking Shangliao (上繚; southeast of present-day Xiushui County, Jiangxi). As the messenger brought him gifts and spoke to him in a flattering tone, Liu Xun was so pleased that he readily agreed to help Sun Ce. However, Liu Ye, then an adviser to Liu Xun, cautioned his lord against falling for Sun Ce's ruse. Liu Ye pointed out that Shangliao could not be conquered easily and warned Liu Xun that Sun Ce might take advantage of the situation to attack Lujiang Commandery. Liu Xun ignored Liu Ye's warning and led his troops to attack Shangliao. As Liu Ye foresaw, Sun Ce invaded and seized control of Lujiang Commandery while Liu Xun was away.

After losing Lujiang Commandery, Liu Xun, along with his younger brother and followers, went to join Cao Cao, who had become a warlord and now controlled the Han central government and the figurehead Emperor Xian. Cao Cao recommended the central government to enfeoff Liu Xun as a marquis and appoint him as General Who Attacks Barbarians (征虜將軍).

As Liu Xun was an old acquaintance of Cao Cao, he thought highly of himself and behaved arrogantly. He broke the law on numerous occasions and defamed others. He was arrested and executed for his crimes after one Li Shencheng (李申成) reported to him to the authorities.

== Family ==
Liu Xun's first wife was Wang Song (王宋). She was captured by Sun Ce's forces when they conquered Lujiang Commandery, but managed to return to her husband later. Although Wang Song had been married to Liu Xun for over 20 years, the couple did not have any children. Liu Xun started to favour his concubine, who was from a certain Sima family in Shanyang Commandery (山陽郡; in present-day Shandong), and had the intention of divorcing Wang Song and replacing her with his concubine. Wang Song then left Liu Xun. Later, she wrote two poems to describe her feelings (see here).

Liu Xun had an elder brother who served as the Inspector (刺史) of Yu Province around the time he joined Cao Cao. After Liu Xun's brother died of illness, his son Liu Wei (劉威) became the acting Inspector. Liu Wei was removed from office after his uncle Liu Xun was executed for his crimes.

== See also ==
- Lists of people of the Three Kingdoms
