= AD 195 =

195 in various calendars
- Gregorian calendar: 195; CXCV
- Ab urbe condita: 948
- Assyrian calendar: 4945
- Balinese saka calendar: 116–117
- Bengali calendar: −399 – −398
- Berber calendar: 1145
- Buddhist calendar: 739
- Burmese calendar: −443
- Byzantine calendar: 5703–5704
- Chinese calendar: 甲戌年 (Wood Dog); 2892 or 2685 — to — 乙亥年 (Wood Pig); 2893 or 2686
- Coptic calendar: −89 – −88
- Discordian calendar: 1361
- Ethiopian calendar: 187–188
- Hebrew calendar: 3955–3956
- Hindu calendars
- Vikram Samvat: 251–252
- Shaka Samvat: 116–117
- Kali Yuga: 3295–3296
- Holocene calendar: 10195
- Iranian calendar: 427 BP – 426 BP
- Islamic calendar: 440 BH – 439 BH
- Javanese calendar: 72–73
- Julian calendar: 195; CXCV
- Korean calendar: 2528
- Minguo calendar: 1717 before ROC 民前1717年
- Nanakshahi calendar: −1273
- Seleucid era: 506/507 AG
- Thai solar calendar: 737–738
- Tibetan calendar: ཤིང་ཕོ་ཁྱི་ལོ་ (male Wood-Dog); 321 or −60 or −832 — to — ཤིང་མོ་ཕག་ལོ་ (female Wood-Boar); 322 or −59 or −831

Year 195 (CXCV) was a common year starting on Wednesday of the Julian calendar. At the time, it was known in Rome as the Year of the Consulship of Scrapula and Clemens (or, less frequently, year 948 Ab urbe condita). The denomination 195 for this year has been used since the early medieval period, when the Anno Domini calendar era became the prevalent method in Europe for naming years.

== Events ==
=== By place ===
==== Roman Empire ====
- Emperor Septimius Severus has the Roman Senate deify the previous emperor Commodus, in an attempt to gain favor with the family of Marcus Aurelius.
- King Vologases V and other eastern princes support the claims of Pescennius Niger. The Roman province of Mesopotamia rises in revolt with Parthian support. Severus marches to Mesopotamia to battle the Parthians.
- The Roman province of Syria is divided and the role of Antioch is diminished. The Romans annex the Syrian cities of Edessa and Nisibis. Severus re-establishes his headquarters and the colonies there.
- Lucius Septimius Bassianus (or Caracalla), age 7, changes his name to Marcus Aurelius Antoninus, to solidify connections with the family of Marcus Aurelius, and is given the title Caesar.
- Clodius Albinus, who had been proclaimed emperor in Britain, crosses into Gaul with his legions, while at the same time recruiting new soldiers. He is soon the head of an army of 150,000 men, according to Cassius Dio. Severus, still in Mesopotamia, hastily returns to Rome.
- The denarius is devalued by Severus. The coin now contains only 50% precious metal.

==== China ====
- In China, the Xiongnu federation crosses the Great Wall and establishes itself in Shanxi Province.
- Last (2nd) year of the Xingping era during the Han dynasty.

== Births ==
- Cao Biao (or Zhuhu), Chinese imperial prince (d. 251)
- Gong Lu (or Dexu), Chinese official and politician (d. 225)
- He Yan (or Pingshu), Chinese official and philosopher (d. 249)
- Wang Su, Chinese official and Confucian scholar (d. 256)

== Deaths ==
- Fan Chou, Chinese general and politician
- Huangfu Song (or Yizhen), Chinese general
- Liu Yao, Chinese warlord and governor (b. 157)
- Lu Kang (or Jining), Chinese politician (b. 126)
- Xu Shao (or Zijiang), Chinese official (b. 150)
- Ze Rong, Chinese warlord and Buddhist leader
- Zhang Miao, Chinese warlord and official
- Zhu Jun, Chinese general and official
