= Xu Shao =

Han dynasty official and commentator (150-196)

- 許劭

Officer of Merit (功曹)
- In office ?–?
- Monarch: Emperor Ling of Han

Personal details
- Born: 150 Pingyu County, Henan
- Died: c.195 (Note: Xu Shao's biography in Houhanshu recorded that Xu Shao died soon after Sun Ce conquered Wu. Vol.556 of Taiping Yulan, citing Yuzhang Ji, recorded that Xu died in 195 (《豫章记》曰：许子将墓在郡南四里。昔子将以中国大乱，远来渡江，随刘繇而卒，藏于昌门里。于时汉兴平二年也。).) (aged 45) Nanchang, Jiangxi
- Relatives: Xu Jing (cousin)
- Occupation: Philosopher, politician
- Courtesy name: Zijiang (子將)

Xu Shao (Chinese: 許劭; pinyin: Xǔ Shào) (150–c.195), courtesy name Zijiang, was a Chinese philosopher and politician who lived in the Eastern Han dynasty.

== Early life and career ==
Xu Shao was from Pingyu County (平輿縣), Runan Commandery (汝南郡), which is present-day Pingyu County, Henan. As a youth, he maintained a good reputation and had a keen interest in the study of human relations. When he was ten (by East Asian reckoning), the commentator Xie Zhen (谢甄; courtesy name Ziwei [子微]) saw him and said, "This boy is a great man rarely seen elsewhere". (Note: Later, when Xu Shao and his brother Xu Qian were older and close to adulthood (ruoguan), Xie Zhen saw them together. This time, he said, "The deep pool of Pingyu County had two loong.")

Xu Shao was known for appraising people. His fame put him on par with others such as Fan Zizhao (樊子昭) and He Yangshi (和陽士). Xu Shao and Guo Tai (郭泰; 128-169) (Note: In Book of the Later Han, Guo's name was recorded as "太", as Fan Ye observed naming taboo for his father Fan Tai.) were famous character evaluators at the time and their appraisals were highly valued among scholar-officials.

Xu Shao started his civil career as an Officer of Merit (功曹) in his home commandery. Xu Qiu (徐璆), the commandery administrator, treated him very respectfully. The other officials in the commandery office became more cautious and conservative in their manners when they heard that Xu Shao was going to be their colleague. When Yuan Shao was on his way home to Runan County after resigning from his post of Prefect (令) of Puyang County, he rode in a carriage and was surrounded by many guards and attendants. Before entering Runan, he ordered his men to leave, saying, "How can I let Xu Zijiang see me like this?" He then travelled home in a single carriage.

== Appraisal of Liu Ye ==
While Xu Shao was at Yangzhou, he praised Liu Ye as someone with the ability to help a sovereign govern his realm. (Note: In his Wanji Lun (万机论), Jiang Ji supposedly criticized Xu Shao for his biased appraisal, by elevating Fan Zizhao and demeaning his cousin Xu Jing; Liu Ye had a discussion with Jiang over the topic.)

== Appraisals of Chen Shi and Chen Fan ==
When a teenage (Note: As Xu Shao was around 18 years old when Chen Fan died in Oct 168, this anecdote most likely took place in the 160s.) Xu Shao went to Yingchuan Commandery (潁川郡; covering present-day southern and central Henan), he visited and mingled with many reputable men in the region, except for Chen Shi. Later, when Chen Fan's wife died, many people attended her funeral but Xu Shao did not show up. When asked, Xu Shao replied, "Taiqiu (Note: As Chen Shi was the mayor (長) of Taiqiu County (太丘縣), he was also known as Chen Taiqiu (陳太丘).) is too well-acquainted, it's difficult for him to be thorough; Zhongju (Chen Fan's courtesy name) is a serious person who hardly makes compromises. These are the reasons why I didn't visit them."

== Appraisal of Cao Cao ==
When Cao Cao was still relatively unknown, he prepared expensive gifts and behaved humbly when he visited Xu Shao in the hope of receiving an appraisal. Xu Shao viewed Cao Cao with contempt and refused to evaluate him, but Cao later found an opportunity to threaten and coerce Xu into giving comments about him. Xu Shao said, "You're a treacherous villain in times of peace and a hero in times of chaos." Cao Cao was very pleased and he left.

However, Sun Sheng's Yitong Zayu (異同雜語) recorded a different quote from Xu Shao. It mentioned that when Cao Cao asked Xu Shao to give him an appraisal, Xu initially refused but eventually relented and said, "You'll be a capable minister in times of peace, and a jianxiong (Note: The archaic term jianxiong (奸雄) is composed of two Chinese characters – jian (奸; "crafty", "villainous") and xiong (雄; "majestic", "heroic"). It was used to describe a person who is very ambitious (typically power hungry) and who resorts to cunning means to achieve aims. See the dictionary definition of jianxiong.) in times of chaos." Cao Cao laughed when he heard that.

== Relationships with others ==
Xu Shao's granduncle was Xu Jing (許敬). Xu Jing's son was Xu Xun (許訓). Xu Xun's son, Xu Xiang (許相), became one of the Three Ducal Ministers by flattering the court eunuchs. Xu Xiang invited Xu Shao to meet him numerous times, but Xu Shao despised him for being a sycophant towards the eunuchs and refused to see him.

Xu Shao was initially on good terms with Li Kui (李逵), who was from the same hometown as him and was known for his good moral conduct, but relations between them soured later. Xu Shao also could not get along with his cousin Xu Jing (許靖). These two incidents caused some damage to Xu Shao's reputation. Before falling out with each other, Xu Shao and his cousin Xu Jing were famous commentators and they would give comments on certain persons or topics on the first day of every month.

== Later life and death ==
Yang Biao (楊彪), the Excellency of Works (司空; one of the Three Ducal Ministers), once attempted to recruit Xu Shao to serve in his office but the latter refused. Later, when the Han imperial court wanted to recruit Xu Shao again, he declined, "Villains are rampant. The political scene is about to become chaotic. I intend to seek refuge in Huaihai (淮海) and keep my family safe." He then moved south to Guangling (廣陵; around present-day Yangzhou, Jiangsu). Tao Qian, the Inspector (刺史) of Xu Province, treated Xu Shao generously, but Xu felt uneasy and he told others, "Tao Gongzu (Tao Qian) appears to enjoy a good reputation but he is actually not sincere and faithful on the inside. He may treat me very well but his attitude towards me will worsen later. I'd better leave." He then headed further south to Qu'e County (曲阿縣; present-day Danyang, Jiangsu), where he joined Liu Yao, the Inspector of Yang Province. Later, as Xu Shao predicted, Tao Qian arrested all his reputable guests.

When Sun Ce was on a series of conquests in the Wu region, Xu Shao and Liu Yao fled south to Yuzhang Commandery (豫章郡; around present-day Nanchang, Jiangxi). At the time, Zhou Shu (周術), the previous Administrator of Yuzhang Commandery, had died of illness so his office was vacant. Liu Biao, the Governor of Jing Province, supported Zhuge Xuan to be the new Administrator, but that became a problem because the Han imperial court had appointed Zhu Hao (son of Zhu Jun) to succeed Zhou Shu. While waiting at Pengze County (彭澤縣; east of present-day Hukou County, Jiangxi), Liu Yao sent Ze Rong to lead troops to attack Zhuge Xuan. Xu Shao cautioned Liu Yao, "Ze Rong doesn't care about how others see him. Zhu Wenming (Zhu Hao) is too trusting of people. You should warn him to be wary (of Ze Rong)." After driving Zhuge Xuan away, as Xu Shao foresaw, Ze Rong killed Zhu Hao and took control of Yuzhang Commandery. Later, Xu Shao died at Yuzhang at the age of 46 (by East Asian age reckoning).

== Family and descendants ==
Xu Shao was recorded to have an elder brother, Xu Qian (许虔; courtesy name Zizheng [子政]; died before 184), who was also famous; the people of Runan claimed that the deep pool of Pingyu County had two loong. (Note: The Runan Xianxian Zhuan (汝南先贤传; cited as an annotation in vol.8 of Shishuo Xinyu) had a short biography on Xu Qian; it also indicated that Xu Qian died at the age of 35 (by East Asian reckoning).)

Xu Shao was recorded to have a son, Xu Hun (许混; fl.195-226), who was pure and discerning of human nature; he served as a Master of Writing during Cao Rui's reign.

== See also ==
- Lists of people of the Three Kingdoms
