= Xu Jing (Three Kingdoms) =

Shu Han state official (died 222)

- 許靖

Minister over the Masses (司徒)
- In office May 221 – September or October 222
- Monarch: Liu Bei
- Chancellor: Zhuge Liang

Grand Tutor (太傅)
- In office 219 – May 221
- Monarch: Liu Bei

Chief Clerk to the General of the Left (左將軍長史)
- In office c. 215 – 219
- Monarch: Emperor Xian of Han

Administrator of Shu Commandery (蜀郡太守)
- In office ? – 214
- Monarch: Emperor Xian of Han

Administrator of Guanghan (廣漢太守)
- In office ?–?
- Monarch: Emperor Xian of Han

Administrator of Ba Commandery (巴郡太守)
- In office ?–?
- Monarch: Emperor Xian of Han

Personal details
- Born: Unknown Pingyu County, Henan
- Died: 222 Chengdu, Sichuan
- Relations: Xu Chang (cousin); Xu Shao (cousin); Xu You (许游) (grandson; son of Xu Qin)
- Children: Xu Qin (许钦)
- Occupation: Politician
- Courtesy name: Wenxiu (文休)

Xu Jing (c.late 140s - September or October 222), courtesy name Wenxiu, was a Chinese politician of the state of Shu Han in the early Three Kingdoms period of China. After Liu Zhang announced his submission to Liu Bei, Xu Jing swore his allegiance to Liu Bei. Like his cousin Xu Shao, Xu Jing was famous for being a good character evaluator. However, the cousins could not get along with each other. Before falling out with each other, they would give comments on certain persons or topics on the first day of every month.

After Liu Bei was declared himself emperor and established the Shu Han state on 15 May 221, he appointed Xu Jing as Minister over the Masses, an office ranking just below Imperial Chancellor (held by Zhuge Liang). Xu Jing died in September or October 222, after holding office for about 16 months. The office of Minister of the Masses wasn't filled after Xu's death.

As Xu Jing's elder brother once served under Chen Ji, Xu Jing was on good terms with Yuan Huan, Hua Xin and Wang Lang. After Cao Cao was made Duke of Wei in 213, Hua Xin, Wang Lang and Chen Qun (Chen Ji's son) served as important officials of Wei. Despite their different allegiances, the three frequently exchanged warm letters with Xu Jing, reminiscing about the past.

Chen Zhi was a maternal grandson of an elder brother of Xu Jing. As Chen was orphaned at a young age, he was raised by Xu Jing.

== See also ==
- Lists of people of the Three Kingdoms
