= Liu Ji (Eastern Wu) =

Chinese state of Eastern Wu official (185-233)

- 劉基

Minister of the Household (光祿勳)
- In office 229 – 233
- Monarch: Sun Quan

Grand Prefect of Agriculture (大農令)
- In office 221 – 229
- Monarch: Sun Quan

Personal details
- Born: 185 (Note: If Liu Ji was about 48 years old when he died in 233, his birth year should be c.185.)
- Died: 233 (aged 48)
- Children: Sun Ba's wife
- Parent: Liu Yao (father)
- Occupation: Politician
- Courtesy name: Jingyu (敬輿)

Liu Ji (185–233), courtesy name Jingyu, was a Chinese politician of the state of Eastern Wu in the Three Kingdoms period of China. He was a descendant of the imperial clan of the Han dynasty and the eldest son of the minor warlord Liu Yao.

== Life ==
Liu Ji was of noble descent. His ancestor was Liu Fei, the eldest son of the Han dynasty's founder, Liu Bang (Emperor Gao). (Note: See Liu Yao (warlord)#Family background for details.) His father, Liu Yao, was a minor warlord who served as the governor of Yang Province from 194 to 198.

When Liu Yao died in 198 in Yuzhang Commandery (豫章郡; around present-day Nanchang, Jiangxi), Liu Ji, then 13 years old, presided over his father's funeral. He received many condolence gifts from those who attended the funeral but he declined all of them. A year later, when the warlord Sun Ce passed by Yuzhang Commandery, he collected Liu Yao's remains, arranged a proper memorial service for Liu Yao, and treated Liu Yao's family kindly. Wang Lang also advised Sun Ce to treat Liu Ji well: "[...] The eldest son of Zhengli (Note: Liu Yao's courtesy name) has great ambition. I believe there is something extraordinary about him. [...] Wouldn't it be good to treat him with kindness?"

Liu Ji grew up in poverty and hardship with his two younger brothers, Liu Shuo (劉鑠) and Liu Shang (劉尚). The environment trained him to be sensible and empathetic. He often slept late and woke up early. Even his wife and concubine(s) hardly saw him. His brothers respected and feared him, and treated him like their father. He also refrained from having a wide social network, and rarely hosted guests at home.

Liu Ji had a good-looking appearance. Sun Ce's younger brother and successor, Sun Quan, highly respected and favoured him. In 219, when Sun Quan was appointed General of Agile Cavalry (驃騎將軍) by the Han imperial court, he recruited Liu Ji to serve as an Assistant in the East Bureau (東曹掾) and subsequently promoted him to Colonel Who Upholds Righteousness (輔義校尉) and Palace Gentleman Who Builds Loyalty (建忠中郎).

In 221, after Sun Quan received the nominal vassal title "King of Wu" (吳王) from the Wei emperor Cao Pi, he appointed Liu Ji as Grand Prefect of Agriculture (大農令). He threw a feast to celebrate with his subjects. During the feast, Yu Fan, an official under Sun Quan, showed disrespect towards his lord. When an enraged Sun Quan drew his sword and wanted to kill Yu Fan, Liu Ji stood up, grabbed Sun Quan and pleaded with him to spare Yu Fan. He told Sun Quan, "If Your Majesty kills a good man when you're drunk, even if Yu Fan is in the wrong, who would understand the truth? Your Majesty is famous and respected because you showed acceptance and tolerance towards virtuous and talented people over the years. Is it worth ruining your good reputation in just one day?" Sun Quan said, "If Cao Mengde can kill Kong Wenju, why can't I do the same to Yu Fan?" Liu Ji replied, "Mengde killed virtuous people recklessly, hence he didn't win over people's hearts. Your Majesty promotes moral values and righteousness, and wishes to be compared to Yao and Shun. Why are you comparing yourself to him?" Sun Quan then spared Yu Fan and instructed his men to ignore his orders in the future if he was not sober when he ordered someone to be executed.

On one hot summer day, when Sun Quan was feasting on board a ship, a thunderstorm suddenly broke out. After his servants came to shelter him from the downpour, Sun Quan ordered them to do the same for Liu Ji too, but not any other subject. This incident showed how much Sun Quan favoured Liu Ji. Liu Ji later became the Prefect of the Gentlemen of the Palace (郎中令).

In 229, after Sun Quan declared himself emperor and established the state of Eastern Wu, he appointed Liu Ji as Minister of the Household (光祿勳; or Superintendent of the Imperial Court), in addition to giving him some duties of a Master of Writing (尚書).

Liu Ji died in 233 at the age of 49 (by East Asian age reckoning).

Liu Ji's daughter married Sun Ba, one of Sun Quan's sons. She lived in a first-class residence and received gifts from Sun Quan all year round. Sun Quan's treatment of her was equivalent to that of two of his other daughters-in-law – Quan Huijie (Sun Liang's wife) and Consort Zhang (Sun He's wife).

== See also ==
- Lists of people of the Three Kingdoms
- Eastern Wu family trees
