= AD 157 =

157 in various calendars
- Gregorian calendar: 157; CLVII
- Ab urbe condita: 910
- Assyrian calendar: 4907
- Balinese saka calendar: 78–79
- Bengali calendar: −437 – −436
- Berber calendar: 1107
- Buddhist calendar: 701
- Burmese calendar: −481
- Byzantine calendar: 5665–5666
- Chinese calendar: 丙申年 (Fire Monkey); 2854 or 2647 — to — 丁酉年 (Fire Rooster); 2855 or 2648
- Coptic calendar: −127 – −126
- Discordian calendar: 1323
- Ethiopian calendar: 149–150
- Hebrew calendar: 3917–3918
- Hindu calendars
- Vikram Samvat: 213–214
- Shaka Samvat: 78–79
- Kali Yuga: 3257–3258
- Holocene calendar: 10157
- Iranian calendar: 465 BP – 464 BP
- Islamic calendar: 479 BH – 478 BH
- Javanese calendar: 33–34
- Julian calendar: 157; CLVII
- Korean calendar: 2490
- Minguo calendar: 1755 before ROC 民前1755年
- Nanakshahi calendar: −1311
- Seleucid era: 468/469 AG
- Thai solar calendar: 699–700
- Tibetan calendar: མེ་ཕོ་སྤྲེ་ལོ་ (male Fire-Monkey); 283 or −98 or −870 — to — མེ་མོ་བྱ་ལོ་ (female Fire-Bird); 284 or −97 or −869

Year 157 (CLVII) was a common year starting on Friday of the Julian calendar. At the time, it was known as the Year of the Consulship of Civica and Aquillus (or, less frequently, year 910 Ab urbe condita). The denomination 157 for this year has been used since the early medieval period, when the Anno Domini calendar era became the prevalent method in Europe for naming years.

== Events ==
=== Roman Empire ===
- A revolt against Roman rule begins in Dacia.

=== Asia ===
- In Jiuzhen (modern day Northern Vietnam), during the second Era of Northern Domination, a rebellion led by Chu Đạt breaks out and lasts for two to three years, until it is quelled by the Han Dynasty, under emperor Huan.

== Births ==
- Gaius Caesonius Macer Rufinianus, Roman politician (d. 237)
- Hua Xin, Chinese official and minister (d. 232)
- Liu Yao, Chinese governor and warlord (d. 198)
- Xun You, Chinese official and statesman (d. 214)
