= Dong Bai =

Dong Bai (董白) may refer to:

- Dong Bai, (c.2nd century CE) granddaughter of the Eastern Han warlord Dong Zhuo
- Dong Xiaowan (1624–1651), Late Ming female artist, poet, writer and chef
