= Ze Rong =

Han dynasty warlord and Buddhist leader (died 195)

- Chinese: 笮融
Transcriptions
Standard Mandarin
- Hanyu Pinyin: Zé Róng

Ze Rong (died 195 C.E.) was a minor warlord and Buddhist leader who lived during the late Eastern Han dynasty of China. He was active in Xu Province and was nominally a subordinate of the provincial governor, Tao Qian. When the warlord Cao Cao invaded Xu Province around 193, Ze Rong fled south with his followers, plundering two commanderies and killing their administrators along the way. He took shelter under the warlord Liu Yao but betrayed him later and seized control of Yuzhang Commandery (around present-day Nanchang, Jiangxi). Liu Yao ultimately defeated him and drove him out of the commandery. Ze Rong fled into the hills, where he was killed by the Shanyue tribes.

== Life ==
Ze Rong was from Danyang Commandery (丹陽郡), which is around present-day Xuancheng, Anhui. He gathered a few hundred followers and brought them along to join Tao Qian, the Governor of Xu Province. Tao Qian appointed him as a logistics officer and tasked him with overseeing the transporting of resources from Guangling (廣陵; around present-day Huai'an, Jiangsu), Xiapi (下邳; around present-day Pizhou, Jiangsu) and Pengcheng (彭城; present-day Xuzhou, Jiangsu) commanderies to Xu Province's capital, Tan County (郯縣; present-day Tancheng County, Shandong). However, Ze Rong allowed his followers to behave lawlessly and embezzled the resources from the three commanderies for himself. He then used the resources to build a large Buddhist temple in Xiapi Commandery with a capacity of 3,000 people. He also had large bronze statues constructed, painted in gold, and lavishly decorated. He also promoted Buddhism by welcoming people from neighbouring commanderies to join him, and managed to attract over 5,000 households. During Vesak, he hosted feasts for the masses along the streets and used cotton to cover several tens of li of the roads. Several thousands of people showed up to partake in the festivities. The budget was in the range of billions.

In 193, when the warlord Cao Cao attacked Xu Province, Ze Rong brought along several thousands of followers and 3,000 horses and fled to Guangling Commandery. Zhao Yu (趙昱), the Administrator of Guangling Commandery, treated Ze Rong like an honoured guest. When Ze Rong noticed that Guangling Commandery was abundant in wealth and resources, he lured Zhao Yu into a trap and killed him when he was drunk. He then ordered his followers to plunder Guangling Commandery, leaving behind nothing for the citizens. They then headed south to Moling (秣陵; present-day Jiangning District, Nanjing, Jiangsu) to join Xue Li (薛禮), the former Chancellor of Pengcheng who had moved to Moling with his men after being forced out of Xu Province by Tao Qian. Ze Rong later murdered Xue Li as well and took control of his forces.

Ze Rong later joined Liu Yao, the Governor of Yang Province. In 195, Liu Yao lost his base to the warlord Sun Ce, who was on a series of conquests in the Jiangdong region. Liu Yao then headed south to take shelter in Yuzhang Commandery (豫章郡; around present-day Nanchang, Jiangxi). At the time, Zhou Shu (周術), the previous Administrator of Yuzhang Commandery, had died of illness so his office was vacant. Liu Biao, the Governor of Jing Province, supported Zhuge Xuan to be the new Administrator, but that became a problem because the Han imperial court had appointed Zhu Hao to succeed Zhou Shu. While waiting at Pengze County (彭澤縣; east of present-day Hukou County, Jiangxi), Liu Yao sent Ze Rong to lead troops to attack Zhuge Xuan. Xu Shao cautioned Liu Yao, "Ze Rong doesn't care about how others see him. Zhu Wenming (Note: "Wenming" was likely Zhu Hao's courtesy name.) is too trusting of people. You should warn him to be wary (of Ze Rong)." After driving Zhuge Xuan away, as Xu Shao foresaw, Ze Rong killed Zhu Hao and took control of Yuzhang Commandery. (Note: In his Zizhi Tongjian Kaoyi, Sima Guang noted that while the Xiandi Chunqiu recorded that Liu Biao appointed Zhuge Xuan as the Administrator of Yuzhang, and Tao Qian's biography in Fan Ye's Houhanshu recorded that Zhuge Xuan was working for Liu Biao, Zhuge Liang's biography in Sanguozhi recorded that Zhuge Xuan was working for Yuan Shu. Sima then reasoned that given Xu Shao's advice to Liu Yao that Liu Yao should submit to Liu Biao, Liu Yao would not have attacked Zhuge Xuan if the latter was working for Liu Biao. Thus, Tongjian adopted the account found in Zhuge Liang's biography.)

Liu Yao attacked Ze Rong but was driven back. He then recruited more soldiers from the surrounding counties to strengthen his forces and eventually defeated Ze Rong. Ze Rong fled into the hills, where he met his end at the hands of the Shanyue tribes.

== See also ==
- Lists of people of the Three Kingdoms
