= Situ (office) =

Imperial Chinese ministerial rank

Situ was one of the highest ranking government offices in ancient China. Established in the Western Zhou dynasty, it was originally written as 司土 (pinyin: Sītǔ), meaning Administrator of Land.

During the Han dynasty, the title became written with the different characters 司徒 (pinyin: Sītú; lit. 'Administrator of people'), which is translated variously as Minister over the Masses or Excellency over the Masses. It was one of the three most important official posts during the Han dynasty, called the Three Excellencies. The nominal salary for the post was 20,000 dàn (石) of grain.

The title is the origin of the surname Situ.

== List of officeholders ==
=== Three Sovereigns and Five Emperors ===
==== Yao ====
- Shun

==== Shun ====
- Xie of Shang

=== Han Dynasty ===
==== Western Han Dynasty ====
- Kong Guang
- Ma Gong
- Ping Yan

==== Gengshi Emperor ====
- Liu Bosheng
- Liu Ci

==== Eastern Han Dynasty ====
- Yuan An
- Yang Biao
- Wang Yun

=== Three Kingdoms ===
==== Cao Wei ====
- Hua Xin
- Wang Lang
- Dong Zhao
- Chen Jiao
- Han Ji
- Wei Zhen
- Gao Rou
- Zheng Chong
- Zhong Hui
- He Zeng
- Sima Wang

==== Shu Han ====
- Xu Jing

==== Eastern Wu ====
- Zhuge Dan
- Ding Gu
- Dong Chao
- He Zhi

=== Jin Dynasty ===
- Sima Rong
- Sima Yue
- Sima Dewen

=== Tang Dynasty ===
- Li Shimin
- Li Yuanji
- Zhangsun Wuji
- Li Yuanjing
- Kong Wei

== See also ==
- Government of the Han dynasty
- Tai Situpa (Grand Situ)
- Translation of Han dynasty titles
- Three Ducal Ministers
