= AD 150 =

150 in various calendars
- Gregorian calendar: 150; CL
- Ab urbe condita: 903
- Assyrian calendar: 4900
- Balinese saka calendar: 71–72
- Bengali calendar: −444 – −443
- Berber calendar: 1100
- Buddhist calendar: 694
- Burmese calendar: −488
- Byzantine calendar: 5658–5659
- Chinese calendar: 己丑年 (Earth Ox); 2847 or 2640 — to — 庚寅年 (Metal Tiger); 2848 or 2641
- Coptic calendar: −134 – −133
- Discordian calendar: 1316
- Ethiopian calendar: 142–143
- Hebrew calendar: 3910–3911
- Hindu calendars
- Vikram Samvat: 206–207
- Shaka Samvat: 71–72
- Kali Yuga: 3250–3251
- Holocene calendar: 10150
- Iranian calendar: 472 BP – 471 BP
- Islamic calendar: 487 BH – 486 BH
- Javanese calendar: 25–26
- Julian calendar: 150; CL
- Korean calendar: 2483
- Minguo calendar: 1762 before ROC 民前1762年
- Nanakshahi calendar: −1318
- Seleucid era: 461/462 AG
- Thai solar calendar: 692–693
- Tibetan calendar: ས་མོ་གླང་ལོ་ (female Earth-Ox); 276 or −105 or −877 — to — ལྕགས་ཕོ་སྟག་ལོ་ (male Iron-Tiger); 277 or −104 or −876

Year 150 (CL) was a common year starting on Wednesday of the Julian calendar. In the Roman Empire, it was known as the Year of the Consulship of Squilla and Vetus (or, less frequently, year 903 Ab urbe condita). The denomination 150 for this year has been used since the early medieval period, when the Anno Domini calendar era became the prevalent method in Europe for naming years.

== Events ==
=== By place ===
==== Roman Empire ====
- The Roman town Forum Hadriani (Voorburg) receives the title of Municipium Aelium Cananefatium, "the town of the Cananefates" (modern Netherlands). The town is awarded with rights to organize markets.
- The Germans of the east move south, into the Carpathians and Black Sea area.
- The Albani appear in the Roman province of Macedonia, specifically in Epirus.

==== Asia ====
- First and only year of the "Heping" era of the Han dynasty in China.

==== Americas ====
- The Middle Culture period of Mayan civilization ends (approximate date).
- The Great Pyramid of the Sun is constructed in Teotihuacan. It is the tallest pre-Columbian building in the Americas.

=== By topic ===
==== Religion ====
- Marcion of Sinope produces his Bible canon, consisting of purged versions of the Gospel of Luke and ten Pauline letters (approximate date).

==== Art and science ====
- The earliest atlas (Ptolemy's Geography) is made (approximate date).
- This is also the approximate date of completion of Ptolemy's monumental work Almagest. The geocentric cosmology contained in it holds sway for 1,400 years.
- Antoninus Liberalis writes a work on mythology (Μεταμορφωσεων Συναγωγη) (approximate date).
- Paper, made in China, arrives in Transoxiana.

== Births ==
- March 7 – Lucilla, Roman empress (d. 182)
- Cassius Dio, Roman historian (approximate year)
- Clement of Alexandria, Greek theologian (d. 215)
- Gongsun Du, Chinese general and warlord (d. 204)
- Lucius Fabius Cilo, Roman politician (approximate date)
- Monoimus, Arab gnostic and writer (approximate date)
- Nagarjuna, founder of Mahayana "Great Vehicle" (d. c. 250)
- Xu Shao, Chinese official of the Han dynasty (d. 195)
- Yufuluo, Chanyu of the southern Xiongnu (d. 196)
- Zhang Zhongjing, Chinese physician (d. 219)

== Deaths ==
- Aspasius, Greek philosopher and writer (approximate date)
- Aśvaghoṣa, Indian philosopher and poet (approximate date)
- Liang Na, Chinese empress of the Han dynasty (b. 116)
