= Zhuge Xuan =

Chinese Eastern Han government official (died 197)

- 諸葛玄

Administrator of Yuzhang (豫章太守)
- In office ? – 195
- Monarch: Emperor Xian of Han

Personal details
- Born: Unknown Yinan County / Yishui County, Shandong
- Died: c. February 197 Chongren County, Jiangxi or Xiangyang, Hubei
- Relatives: Zhuge Liang; Zhuge Jin; Zhuge Dan
- Occupation: Politician

Zhuge Xuan (died c. February 197) (Note: Rafe de Crespigny erroneously recorded in A Biographical Dictionary of Later Han to the Three Kingdoms 23-220 AD that Zhuge Xuan died in 196. The Xiandi Chunqiu (獻帝春秋) recorded that he died in the 1st month of the 2nd year of the Jian'an era (196–220) in the reign of Emperor Xian of Han. This month corresponds to 5 Feb to 6 Mar 197 in the Gregorian calendar.) was a Chinese politician who lived during the late Eastern Han dynasty of China. He is best known for briefly serving as the Administrator of Yuzhang Commandery (around present-day Nanchang, Jiangxi) in the mid-190s. He was also a cousin-uncle (first/second cousin once removed) of Zhuge Liang, a prominent statesman of the state of Shu Han during the Three Kingdoms period.

== Life ==
Zhuge Xuan was from Yangdu County (陽都縣), Langya Commandery (琅邪郡), which is located in present-day Yinan County or Yishui County, Shandong. His ancestor, Zhuge Feng (諸葛豐), was a Western Han dynasty official who served as Colonel-Director of Retainers (司隷校尉) under Emperor Yuan (r. 48–33 BCE). One of his cousins, Zhuge Gui (諸葛珪), served as an assistant official in Taishan Commandery (泰山郡; around present-day Tai'an, Shandong) during the late Eastern Han dynasty under Emperor Ling (r. 168–189 CE).

As Zhuge Gui and his wife died early, Zhuge Xuan raised their two younger sons, Zhuge Liang and Zhuge Jun (諸葛均). Sometime in the mid-190s, the warlord Yuan Shu appointed Zhuge Xuan as the Administrator (太守) of Yuzhang Commandery (豫章郡; around present-day Nanchang, Jiangxi). Zhuge Xuan brought Zhuge Liang and Zhuge Jun with him to Yuzhang Commandery and wanted to appoint them as his subordinates. However, around 195, he left Yuzhang Commandery when the Han central government officially designated Zhu Hao as the new Administrator. Zhuge Xuan then brought Zhuge Liang and Zhuge Jun to Jing Province (covering present-day Hubei and Hunan) to live with his friend Liu Biao, who was also Jing Province's governor. After Zhuge Xuan's death, Zhuge Liang and Zhuge Jun moved to Longzhong (隆中), an area about 20 li west of Xiangyang, the capital of Jing Province. The Xiandi Chunqiu (獻帝春秋) by Yuan Wei (袁暐) recorded a completely different account about Zhuge Xuan. It mentioned that Liu Biao – instead of Yuan Shu – appointed Zhuge Xuan as the Administrator of Yuzhang Commandery to replace the previous Administrator, Zhou Shu (周術), who died in office. However, the Han central government, upon receiving news of Zhou Shu's death, appointed Zhu Hao (son of Zhu Jun) as the new Administrator. As Zhuge Xuan was reluctant to transfer power to Zhu Hao, the latter allied with Liu Yao, the Inspector of Yang Province, to attack him. Zhuge Xuan retreated to Xicheng County (西城縣; south of present-day Chongren County, Jiangxi) after he lost Yuzhang Commandery's capital, Nanchang. In February 197, the people in Xicheng County rebelled against Zhuge Xuan, killed him and sent his head to Liu Yao. (Note: In his Zizhi Tongjian Kaoyi, Sima Guang noted the discrepancies across various sources (that the Xiandi Chunqiu recorded that Liu Biao appointed Zhuge Xuan as the Administrator of Yuzhang, Tao Qian's biography in Fan Ye's Houhanshu recorded that Zhuge Xuan was working for Liu Biao, while Zhuge Liang's biography in Sanguozhi recorded that Zhuge Xuan was working for Yuan Shu). Sima then reasoned that given Xu Shao's advice to Liu Yao that Liu Yao should submit to Liu Biao, Liu Yao would not have attacked Zhuge Xuan if the latter was working for Liu Biao. Thus, Tongjian adopted the account found in Zhuge Liang's biography.)

The Zizhi Tongjian by Sima Guang adopted an edited amalgamation of the accounts found in Xiandi Chunqiu and Zhuge Liang's biography in Sanguozhi, (Note: i.e. Zhuge Xuan was appointed Administrator of Yuzhang by Yuan Shu, and that Liu Yao attacked Zhuge Xuan together with Zhu Hao.) up to the point where Zhu Hao allied with Liu Yao to force Zhuge Xuan out of Yuzhang Commandery. It does not confirm that Zhuge Xuan died in Xicheng County in February 197.

== See also ==
- Lists of people of the Three Kingdoms
