= Hua Xin =

Chinese Eastern Han politician (157/158-232)

- 華歆

Grand Commandant (太尉)
- In office January or February 227 – 30 January 232
- Monarch: Cao Rui
- Succeeded by: Sima Yi

Minister over the Masses (司徒)
- In office 11 December 220 – January or February 227
- Monarch: Cao Pi
- Succeeded by: Wang Lang

Chancellor of State (相國) (in Cao Pi's vassal kingdom)
- In office 6 April – 11 December 220
- Monarch: Emperor Xian of Han
- Chancellor: Cao Pi
- Preceded by: Zhong Yao

Grandee Secretary (御史大夫) (in Cao Cao's vassal kingdom)
- In office c.August 217 – April 220
- Monarch: Emperor Xian of Han
- Chancellor: Cao Cao

Prefect of the Masters of Writing (尚書令)
- In office 212–?
- Monarch: Emperor Xian of Han
- Chancellor: Cao Cao
- Preceded by: Xun Yu

Administrator of Yuzhang (豫章太守)
- In office 192–199
- Monarch: Emperor Xian of Han

Personal details
- Born: 157 (Note: Cao Rui's biography in the Sanguozhi recorded that Hua Xin died on the wuwu day of the 12th month of the 5th year of the Taihe era of Cao Rui's reign. This date corresponds to 30 January 232 in the Gregorian calendar. The Wei Shu also recorded that Hua Xin was 75 (by East Asian age reckoning) when he died. Hua Xin is likely born in the 3rd year of the Yong'shou era of the reign of Emperor Huan of Han; the year corresponds to 28 Jan 157 to 16 Feb 158, and has 13 months due to having a leap month.) Yucheng, Shandong
- Died: 30 January 232 (aged 74)
- Spouses: Lady Teng; Luo Tong's mother
- Relations: Hua Ji (brother); Hua Yan (grandson; son of Hua Bing); Hua Fang (great-granddaughter; granddaughter of Hua Bing and daughter of Hua Yan; wife of Wang Jun)
- Children: Hua Biao; Hua Bo; Hua Zhou; Hua Bing; Luo Tong (stepson)
- Occupation: Politician
- Courtesy name: Ziyu (子魚)
- Posthumous name: Marquis Jing (敬侯)
- Peerage: Marquis of Boping (博平侯)

Hua Xin (157 – 30 January 232), courtesy name Ziyu, was a Chinese politician who lived during the late Eastern Han dynasty and Three Kingdoms period of China. He initially served directly under the central government of the Eastern Han dynasty. Later, he served under the warlord Sun Ce and then under the warlord Cao Cao. He continued to serve in the Cao Wei state during the Three Kingdoms period.

== Biography ==
As a clerk in Gaotang County, Hua Xin was nominated as xiaolian, and appointed as Langzhong (郎中). In 187, Hua was appointed as Shangshu Lang (尚书郎). When Dong Zhuo evacuated the court from Luoyang to Chang'an, Hua requested a position as the administrator of Shanggui County (上邽). He encountered Yuan Shu's army en route and was accepted to the latter's court. However, Hua left after his advice for Yuan to attack Dong Zhuo was dismissed.

In 192, Hua was appointed as the administrator of Yuzhang (豫章) Commandery. After Liu Yao, governor of Yang Province died, his troops were willing to transfer the commandership to Hua. Hua declined, believing it to be inappropriate as an official of the Han. He joined the forces of Sun Ce as the latter was preparing the conquest of Jiangdong. Sun treated him as an honored guest.

In 200, after Sun Ce was assassinated, the imperial court under Cao Cao called Hua back to Luoyang. Sun Quan was hesitant to allow him to go, but Hua convinced Sun that his departure would be a sign of goodwill to Cao Cao. Eventually, Hua replaced Xun Yu as the Shangshu Ling (尚书令, Prefect of the Masters of Writing). In 213, Hua was Junshi (军师, military advisor) in Cao's war against Sun Quan. Around August 217, Hua became the first Grandee Secretary (御史大夫) in the Kingdom of Wei, after Cao Cao became Prince of Wei (魏王). In April 220, after Cao Pi became Prince of Wei, Hua became the Chancellor of Wei, and the Marquis of Anle Ting (安乐亭侯).

In late December 220, Cao Pi assumed the title of emperor after usurping the Han, and Hua was appointed the Minister over the Masses. Cao Pi was proud of his Three Ducal Ministers: Zhong Yao was Grand Commandant, Hua Xin was Minister over the Masses while Wang Lang was Minister of Works. Once, after a court session was dismissed, Cao Pi said to those around him, "These three Ducal Ministers were great men of their generation; future generations can hardly hope to continue their legacies!"

In 226, Hua was granted the Marquis of Boping (博平侯), and appointed as Grand Commandant. In October 230, after more than a month of slow progress, he sent a memorial to the Imperial Court to oppose Cao Zhen's campaign, resulting in Cao Rui ordering the troops to retreat. Hua Xin died in January 232.

== Legacy ==
A famous story of Hua Xin was recorded in A New Account of the Tales of the World:

Both Hua Xin and Wang Lang were fleeing in a boat. On person hoped to board, but Hua Xin was hesitant. Wang Lang said:" Fortunately the boat is still spacious. Why not?" Later, the bandits approached, and Wang wanted to abandon the person whom they took along. Hua Xin said:" This is why I was originally hesitant. Now that we have accepted his entrustment of himself, can we abandon him because of emergency?" Therefore they carried and saved him as before. This is how people determined who is better between Hua and Wang.

— Volume 1. Virtuous Conduct, A New Account of the Tales of the World

On the other hand, Hua Xin was disparaged in the classic Chinese novel Romance of the Three Kingdoms. As related in the novel, he was serving Cao Cao, when a plan to assassinate Cao Cao, was discovered. Since it had been instigated by Empress Fu, Cao Cao dispatched him with a detachment of soldiers to the palace. The empress was hiding but he found her and dragged her out by her hair. The novel then offers an assessment of Hua Xin's character that begins by repeating his description in Chen Shou's Records of Three Kingdoms. It notes he was a member of a renowned trio of scholars known as the "Dragon" and was referred to as the Dragon's Head. The novel quotes an apparently fictitious poem, which, in the Moss Roberts translation, ends with the lines For one day spent, Cao Cao's cruelty to abet: / A name forever cursed, "Dragon Pate" [Dragon Head].

The C. H. Brewitt Taylor translation of the poem differs but makes the same point:

That was a dastardly thing that Hua Xin did,
When he broke down the wall where the Empress hid
And dragged her forth by the hair.
He lent his aid to a foul, foul crime
And execrations throughout all time,
Have been, and shall be, his share

— Luo Guanzhong (c. 1300-1400), translated by C. H. Brewitt Taylor (1925), Romance of the Three Kingdoms, chap. 66

Note however, there is no mention in the biography of Hua Xin in Chen Shou's Records indicating that he was actually involved in the arrest of Empress Fu.

== See also ==
- Lists of people of the Three Kingdoms
