= Chen Deng =

Eastern Han official and general (c.170–c.209)

- 陳登

Administrator of Dongcheng (東城太守)
- In office ?–?
- Monarch: Emperor Xian of Han

General Who Calms the Waves (伏波將軍)
- In office 199 – ?
- Monarch: Emperor Xian of Han

Administrator of Guangling (廣陵太守)
- In office 197 – ?
- Monarch: Emperor Xian of Han

Colonel of Agriculture (典農校尉) (under Tao Qian)
- In office ?–?
- Monarch: Emperor Xian of Han

Chief of Dongyang (東陽長)
- In office ?–?
- Monarch: Emperor Xian of Han

Personal details
- Born: Unknown Lianshui County, Jiangsu
- Died: Unknown (aged 38)
- Relations: Chen Qiu (granduncle); Chen Ying (brother); two other brothers
- Children: Chen Su
- Parent: Chen Gui (father)
- Occupation: Military general, politician
- Courtesy name: Yuanlong (元龍)

Chen Deng (c. 170 – c. 209), courtesy name Yuanlong, (Note: The Houhanshu (後漢書) by Xie Cheng (謝承) recorded that Chen Deng's courtesy name was Fulong (符龍).) was a Chinese military general and politician who lived in the late Eastern Han dynasty of China. Born in a family of government officials in Xu Province, he started his career as a county chief at the age of 24 and later became an agriculture official under Tao Qian, the Governor of Xu Province. After Tao Qian's death in 194, Chen Deng supported Liu Bei to be the new Governor. However, in 196, he was forced to become a subordinate of the warlord Lü Bu after the latter seized control of Xu Province from Liu Bei. During this time, Chen Deng and his father Chen Gui pretended to be loyal towards Lü Bu, while secretly undermining his influence by dissuading him from allying with another warlord Yuan Shu. Chen Deng also secretly agreed to serve as a mole in Xu Province for the warlord Cao Cao, who controlled the Han central government. Chen Deng was then appointed as the Administrator of Guangling Commandery. During the Battle of Xiapi of 198–199, Chen Deng led his troops to join Cao Cao and assisted him in defeating Lü Bu. After the victory, Chen Deng was given an additional appointment as General Who Calms the Waves. During his tenure in Guangling Commandery, he gained high popularity among the people for good and benevolent governance – to the point where the people even wanted to follow him after learning that he had been reassigned to another commandery. He also resisted two invasions by the forces of Sun Ce, a warlord who controlled territories in the Jiangnan (or Jiangdong) region. He died in an unknown year at the age of 38 due to an illness caused by intestinal parasites.

== Family background ==
Chen Deng's ancestral home (and probably birthplace too) was in Huaipu County (淮浦縣), Xiapi Commandery (下邳郡), Xu Province (徐州), which is present-day Lianshui County, Jiangsu. He was born in a family of government officials. His granduncle, Chen Qiu (陳球; 118 - 30 Nov 179), held high-ranking positions in the Han government during the reign of Emperor Ling. Chen Qiu's sons, Chen Yu (陳瑀) and Chen Cong (陳琮), served as commandery administrators, respectively. Chen Deng's father, Chen Gui, was the Chancellor (相) of Pei State (沛國; around present-day Pei County, Jiangsu).

== Early life and career ==
At a young age, Chen Deng was already known for his ambition to dedicate his life to serving and helping the people. He was well-read, knowledgeable and talented in literary arts. He was well-versed in both classical and contemporary writings and could apply them well to various contexts.

When he was 24, he was nominated as a xiaolian (civil service candidate) by the local commandery office to serve in the government and was subsequently appointed as the Chief (長) of Dongyang County (東陽縣; west of present-day Jinhu County, Jiangsu). During his tenure, he helped the elderly, took care of orphaned children, and treated the county residents as if they were his family.

== Service under Tao Qian and Liu Bei ==
When a famine broke out in Xu Province, the provincial governor Tao Qian invited Chen Deng to serve as Colonel of Agriculture (典農校尉). During this time, Chen Deng surveyed the lands, assessed their suitability for growing crops, and then implemented agricultural and irrigation works accordingly. Chen Deng's efforts helped to counter the famine and ensure that there were abundant food supplies for the people.

When Tao Qian became critically ill in 194, he told his subordinate Mi Zhu: "No one but Liu Bei can bring peace to this province." After his death, Mi Zhu invited Liu Bei to be the new Governor of Xu Province in accordance with Tao Qian's dying wish. When Liu Bei declined, Chen Deng told him:

"At present, the Han dynasty has been broken and the Han Empire is at risk of collapse. Today is your chance to make great achievements. Our province is abundant in wealth and resources and is home to hundreds of thousands of residents. We hope that you, Sir, can take charge of this province."

When Liu Bei said Yuan Shu would be more suitable to be the Governor, Chen Deng replied:

"Yuan Shu is arrogant and conceited. He isn't someone who can put an end to chaos. Now, all of us want to help you, Sir, raise an army of thousands. With our help, you can achieve the greater goals of reviving the Han dynasty, bringing peace to the people, and making achievements like those of the Five Hegemons. At the same time, you can also achieve lesser goals such as defending this province from external aggression. You can leave your name in history. If you don't agree to our request, then I won't heed your suggestion either."

Kong Rong, the Chancellor (相) of Beihai State (北海國; around present-day Weifang, Shandong), also urged Liu Bei to accept the governorship. Liu Bei agreed and became the new Governor of Xu Province.

Chen Deng also wrote to the warlord Yuan Shao, who was based in Ji Province, to inform him that Liu Bei had become the Governor of Xu Province in accordance with the people's wishes. Yuan Shao approved and remarked that Liu Bei deserved the appointment since he had the people's support.

== Service under Lü Bu ==
In 196, the warlord Lü Bu seized control of Xu Province from Liu Bei while the latter was away at a battle against a rival warlord Yuan Shu, who controlled parts of Yang Province to the south of Xu Province. Chen Deng and his father Chen Gui were forced to become Lü Bu's subordinates. In 197, Yuan Shu proposed forming an alliance with Lü Bu, and offered to arrange a marriage between his son and Lü Bu's daughter. Chen Gui was worried that both Yuan Shu and Lü Bu would pose a greater threat to the Han central government if they became allies, so he advised Lü Bu to avoid having any ties to Yuan Shu. He also urged Lü Bu to build friendly relations with Cao Cao, the warlord who controlled the figurehead Emperor Xian and the Han central government in the imperial capital Xu (許; present-day Xuchang, Henan).

Lü Bu heeded Chen Gui's advice and rejected Yuan Shu's offer. He also arrested Yuan Shu's messenger, Han Yin (韓胤), and sent him as a prisoner to the imperial capital Xu, where Han Yin was publicly executed. After that, Chen Gui asked Lü Bu to send Chen Deng as his representative to meet Cao Cao, but Lü Bu refused. However, after the Han central government sent an emissary to appoint Lü Bu as General of the Left (左將軍), (Note: The Yingxiong Ji (英雄記) recorded that the Han central government appointed Lü Bu as General Who Pacifies the East (平東將軍) instead of General of the Left (左將軍).) Lü Bu was so happy that he sent Chen Deng as his representative to Xu to thank Cao Cao and the Han imperial court.

=== Serving as a mole in Xu Province ===
In the imperial capital Xu, Chen Deng told Cao Cao that Lü Bu was courageous but foolhardy and untrustworthy, and advised Cao Cao to get rid of Lü Bu soon. Cao Cao replied, "Lü Bu has the heart of a rapacious wolf. It's really difficult to allow him to live long. You're probably the only person who understands his temperament." He then increased Chen Gui's salary by 2,000 dan of grain and appointed Chen Deng as the Administrator (太守) of Guangling Commandery (around present-day Huai'an, Jiangsu) in Xu Province. Before Chen Deng left, Cao Cao held his hand and said, "You're now in charge of the task in the east." Chen Deng had agreed to serve as a mole in Xu Province and assist Cao Cao in eliminating Lü Bu.

When Chen Deng returned to Xu Province, an angry Lü Bu confronted him, brandished his ji at him and said, "Your father advised me to side with Cao Cao and reject Yuan Shu's offer. Now, (after following his advice,) I have gained nothing, while you and your father got promoted and rewarded. You must have tricked me! What do you have to say?" Chen Deng maintained his composure and calmly replied:

"When I met Cao Cao, I told him, 'You should treat the General (Lü Bu) in the same way you raise a tiger. Feed it well with meat. If it is not well-fed, it will attack people.' Cao Cao replied, 'You're wrong. He's like a hawk. If it is hungry, it will hunt for you. If it is well-fed, it will fly away.' That was what we talked about."

Lü Bu's anger subsided.

=== Governing Guangling Commandery ===
After assuming office as the Administrator of Guangling Commandery, Chen Deng governed his jurisdiction fairly and justly and built up a good reputation. He also managed to induce Xue Zhou (薛州), a pirate leader, to lead thousands of his followers to surrender to the local government. Within the first year of his governorship, Chen Deng's policies yielded good results in Guangling Commandery and earned him the respect and love of the commandery's residents. Chen Deng remarked, "This can be put to good use." He is generally credited with the establishment of the Gaojia Weir (高家堰, Gāojiāyàn) around the year Jian'an 5 (c. 200), a massive 30-li embankment intended to protect nearby farmland and the Han or Hangou Canal (t 邗溝, s 邗沟, Hángōu) constructed centuries before by the hegemon Fuchai of Wu from floods of the Huai River. It forms the core of the present Hongze Embankment, still used for the same purpose. He also constructed roads through the territory.

=== Battle of Xiapi ===
In 198, Cao Cao led his forces to attack Lü Bu at Xiapi (下邳; present-day Pizhou, Jiangsu), the capital of Xu Province. Chen Deng responded by leading troops from Guangling Commandery to assist Cao Cao in attacking Lü Bu. At the time, as Chen Deng's three younger brothers were in Xiapi, Lü Bu held them hostage and threatened to kill them if Chen Deng did not make peace with him. Chen Deng refused to start peace talks with Lü Bu, and ordered his troops to press on the attack on Xiapi. During the battle, Zhang Hong (張弘), an officer under Lü Bu, sensed that Lü Bu would eventually lose and became afraid that he would get into trouble, so he secretly freed Chen Deng's brothers at night and brought them out of Xiapi to join Chen Deng. Lü Bu eventually lost the battle against Cao Cao, and was captured and executed.

== Resisting Sun Ce's attacks ==
After defeating Lü Bu, Cao Cao suggested to the Han central government to grant Chen Deng an additional appointment, General Who Calms the Waves (伏波將軍), in addition to his existing appointment as the Administrator of Guangling Commandery. At the time, Chen Deng was highly popular among the people living in the Jianghuai region (covering parts of present-day Anhui and Jiangsu). During this time, he came up with the idea of conquering the Jiangnan (or Jiangdong) region, which at the time was under the control of the warlord Sun Ce.

=== Battle of Kuangqi ===
Sometime between early 199 and the summer of 200, (Note: Sun Ce died in the summer of the year 200, so this battle must have taken place in the span of time between early 199 (after the Battle of Xiapi) and before Sun Ce's death in the summer of 200.) Sun Ce sent his forces to attack Chen Deng at Kuangqi (匡琦), a fortress in Guangling Commandery. When Chen Deng's subordinates saw that Sun Ce's invading forces outnumbered the defending troops in Guangling Commandery by more than ten times, they became fearful and worried that they could not resist the enemy. They advised Chen Deng to evacuate everyone in Kuangqi and retreat further inland away from the riverbank, and hoped that some days later Sun Ce's forces would retreat on their own, return to their boats and sail back to Jiangnan.

Chen Deng gave a stern response:

"I have been commissioned by the State to defend this land. In the past, Ma Wenyuan managed to pacify the Baiyue in the south and defeat the Di in the north. I may be unable to eliminate evil and villainy, but I won't allow myself to be called a coward. I will lay down my life to serve the State, uphold righteousness, and bring order to chaos. If I am following the will of Heaven, I will definitely succeed."

He then ordered his troops to shut the gates, hold up inside the fortress and refrain from engaging Sun Ce's forces in battle. Everyone laid low and remained silent until the entire fortress seemed as though it were empty.

Chen Deng quietly observed the situation outside the fortress and saw that it was possible to defeat Sun Ce's forces. He then ordered his troops to get into position and ready themselves for battle. When the opportunity came, he opened the south gates of the fortress and led his troops out to attack the enemy camp and block them from retreating back to their boats at the riverbank. Sun Ce's forces, led by Zhou Zhang (周章), got into battle formation to fight back. Chen Deng then ordered his troops to launch a fierce attack on Sun Ce's forces while he beat a war drum to boost his men's morale. They scored a great victory over Sun Ce's forces, who abandoned their boats and fled. Chen Deng led his men to pursue the retreating enemy soldiers and killed thousands of them.

After losing the first battle, Sun Ce gathered more troops and prepared to launch another attack on Chen Deng. As Chen Deng knew that Sun Ce's forces would attack again, he sent one of his subordinates, Chen Jiao, to ask for reinforcements from Cao Cao. At the same time, he also ordered his men to go to a military camp about 10 li away from the fortress, neatly arrange piles of firewood in rows and columns with a spacing of ten steps, and set them on fire at night. In the meantime, he ordered his troops in the fortress to pretend to celebrate on top of the walls, so as to trick Sun Ce's forces into thinking that Cao Cao's reinforcements had arrived.

As Chen Deng expected, Sun Ce's forces were shocked to see the brightly lit camp and thought that Cao Cao's reinforcements had arrived. Chen Deng then took advantage of their confusion and led his troops to attack them, scoring yet another major victory and killing thousands of enemy soldiers.

=== Inducing Yan Baihu to cause trouble for Sun Ce ===
In the summer of 200, Sun Ce led his forces to attack Huang Zu at Jiangxia Commandery in Jing Province. At the time, Chen Deng was at Sheyang County (射陽縣; east of present-day Baoying County, Jiangsu) and he wanted to take revenge against Sun Ce for attacking his relative Chen Yu (陳瑀), the Administrator of Wu Commandery (around present-day Suzhou, Jiangsu), and seizing Wu Commandery from him in 197. He then induced the bandit leader Yan Baihu to cause trouble for Sun Ce in his home territories in Jiangdong while Sun Ce was away at Jiangxia Commandery.

After Sun Ce returned to Jiangdong, he planned to retaliate against Chen Deng and launch an attack on Sheyang County. However, he had to wait at Dantu County (丹徒縣; in present-day Zhenjiang, Jiangsu) because his troops ran out of supplies. During this time, he went on a hunting excursion and was ambushed and assassinated by the retainers of Xu Gong, a commandery administrator he killed earlier.

== Reassignment to Dongcheng ==
The Han central government later reassigned Chen Deng to be the Administrator (太守) of Dongcheng Commandery (東城郡; around present-day Mingguang, Anhui). As Chen Deng was highly popular among the residents of Guangling Commandery, many of them wanted to leave Guangling and follow him to Dongcheng Commandery when they heard that he had been reassigned there. Chen Deng stopped them and said, "When I was the Administrator of Guangling Commandery, I was lucky enough to be able to repel invasions from Wu. Why should you worry that you won't get a better Administrator after me?"

== Death ==
Around 206, Chen Deng became affected by an illness with symptoms such as a feeling of stuffiness in his chest, facial redness, and loss of appetite. The physician Hua Tuo came to treat him, took his pulse and said, "Sir, there are several sheng of parasites in your stomach and you're on the verge of developing an ulcer. This is caused by the consumption of raw food." He then prepared two sheng of a concoction for Chen Deng and told him to drink one sheng first and finish the remainder a while later. Within a span of time needed to have a meal, Chen Deng vomited up three sheng or more of wriggling parasites with red heads. Half of their bodies looked like raw fish slices. He was immediately relieved of his discomfort. Hua Tuo told him, "This illness will affect you again after three years. If you have a good physician to attend to you, then you will be fine." As Hua Tuo had predicted, three years later, Chen Deng experienced the same illness again. However, as Hua Tuo was not around at the time to heal him, Chen Deng died of his illness. He was 38 (or 39 by East Asian age reckoning) at the time of his death.

== Post-mortem events ==
After Sun Ce died in 200, his younger brother Sun Quan succeeded him as the warlord ruling over the Jiangnan (or Jiangdong) territories to the south of the Yangtze. Whenever Cao Cao came to the north banks of the Yangtze, he sighed and regretted not heeding Chen Deng's earlier advice to attack the Jiangdong territories. His failure to heed Chen Deng's advice had allowed the Sun family to gain a strong foothold in the region and pose a threat to him.

Sometime in the Three Kingdoms period, Cao Cao's son Cao Pi, who became the first emperor of the Cao Wei state, decided to posthumously honour Chen Deng for his contributions during the late Eastern Han dynasty. He appointed Chen Deng's son, Chen Su (陳肅), as a Gentleman Cadet (郎中).

== Appraisal ==
The Xianxian Xingzhuang (先賢行狀) recorded that Chen Deng was known for his loyalty, forthrightness, virtuous character, and for being a resourceful, astute and deep-thinking strategist.

Xu Si (許汜), Liu Bei and Liu Biao once had a discussion on famous persons of their time. When they talked about Chen Deng, Xu Si said, "Chen Yuanlong has a bold and uninhibited personality. He just couldn't help being so forthright." When Liu Bei asked Liu Biao whether he agreed with what Xu Si said, Liu Biao replied, "If I say he's wrong, then I'm probably wrong too because I know (Xu Si) is a good gentleman who won't say untrue things about others. If I say he's right, Yuanlong would become even more famous." Liu Bei then turned to Xu Si and asked him if he had anything to support his claim that Chen Deng was too forthright. Xu Si replied, "During those times of chaos, I passed by Xiapi and visited Yuanlong. Yuanlong didn't behave like a gracious host as he not only didn't greet me, but also made me, a guest, sleep on a lower bed while he slept on a higher bed." Liu Bei then told Xu Si, "Sir, you have the reputation of a guoshi. (Note: Guoshi (國士) could loosely translated as "gentleman of the state". It referred to persons who had made very outstanding contributions to their countries.) Now, the Han Empire is in a state of chaos and the Emperor has been displaced. Everyone hopes that you, Sir, will show concern and do something to save the Han Empire. However, what you did was to ask Yuanlong to provide you land and shelter, and you didn't suggest any ideas to him in return. He hated this kind of behaviour the most, so why should you even expect him to speak to you? If I were him, I'd definitely sleep at the top level of a tower and make you sleep on the ground level. He was kind enough to not distance himself further away from you." Liu Biao laughed when he heard that. Liu Bei then said, "Heroes who are as versatile, courageous and ambitious as Yuanlong can only be found in history. It's very hard to find someone like him in this day and age."

== In Romance of the Three Kingdoms ==
Chen Deng appears as a minor character in the 14th-century historical novel Romance of the Three Kingdoms, which romanticises the historical figures and events before and during the Three Kingdoms period. Although the fictionalised Chen Deng in the novel is generally similar to his historical counterpart, the novel exaggerates and focuses more on the roles played by him and his father Chen Gui in Lü Bu's downfall. The novel also includes a fictitious account of him helping Liu Bei seize control of Xu Province from Che Zhou (車冑), and advising Liu Bei on how to deal with Cao Cao before the Battle of Guandu.

== See also ==
- Lists of people of the Three Kingdoms
