= Dong Bai (Han dynasty) =

Dong Bai 董白
- Lady of Weiyang
- Died: 192
- House: Dong clan
- Dynasty: Han dynasty

Dong Bai (董白, after 178 – 192) was a Chinese noblewoman member of the Dong family during the late Eastern Han dynasty. She was the granddaughter of Dong Zhuo, a warlord and de facto ruler of China during a short period. She received grand titles and lands after Dong Zhuo took control of the Han Imperial court; titling Bai as ''Lady of Weiyang'' (渭陽君) at the age of 15.

The most notable information about her life was recorded in the historiography Record of the Three Kingdoms; she does not appear in the novel Romance of the Three Kingdoms written by Luo Guanzhong.

== Life ==
There are no records about Dong Bai's date of birth and her parents are unknown. She was the granddaughter of Dong Zhuo, a warlord who took control of the imperial capital Luoyang in 189, becoming the de facto ruler of China. Dong Zhuo deposed Emperor Shao and replaced him with the Emperor Xian of Han; he also declared himself chancellor.

Dong Zhuo's corruption and tyrannical ways led Yuan Shao to form an army in opposition to Dong Zhuo's military authority. He fled the Anti-Dong Zhuo Coalition and moved the capital to Chang'an along with the emperor, the emperor's subjects, and Luoyang's residents. Dong Bai and her family accompanied Dong Zhuo.

In 190, when her grandfather Dong Zhuo relocated the capital to Chang'an, despite being under 15 years old and not yet having reached adulthood, Dong Bai was conferred the title of Lady of Weiyang (渭陽君) and granted territory despite Zhu Jun's protests (a rival of Dong Zhuo who fiercely opposed him). For the grand ceremony, a platform was built to be five to six che – about 116 or 139 cm (3 ft 10 in or 4 ft 7 in) in modern conversions– and Dong Bai rode in a blue-covered golden carriage as thousands of officers, generals and soldiers marched behind her, and received a seal from her uncle Dong Huang. It is said that Dong Zhuo distributed titles and lands to his entire family in an attempt to maintain his position. However, the true reasons behind Dong Bai receiving such high titles for a young woman remain unknown, as do her education and relationships with her family.

In 192, with the encouragement of Minister of the Interior Wang Yun, Lü Bu (Dong Zhuo's adopted son) assassinated Dong Zhuo. After Dong Zhuo's death, all members of the Dong clan, including his 90-year-old mother, were executed. It is presumed that Dong Bai was also executed along with the rest of the clan at this time.

== In popular culture ==
- Dong Bai is a playable character in the Dynasty Warriors 9 by Koei Tecmo, a game based on the events of the Three Kingdoms period.
- She also appears in the strategy game series Romance of the Three Kingdoms by Koei Tecmo.

== Bibliography ==
- Chen, Shou (3rd century). Records of the Three Kingdoms (Sanguozhi).
- de Crespigny, Rafe (2007). A Biographical Dictionary of Later Han to the Three Kingdoms 23-220 AD. Leiden: Brill. ISBN 9789004156050.
- Fan, Ye (5th century). Book of the Later Han (Houhanshu).
