= Three Ducal Ministers =

Highest officials in Ancient China and Imperial China

The Three Ducal Ministers (Chinese: 三公; pinyin: Sān Gōng), also translated as the Three Dukes, Three Excellencies, or the Three Lords, was the collective name for the three highest officials in Ancient China and Imperial China. These posts were abolished by Cao Cao in 208 AD and replaced with the position of Grand Chancellor. When Cao Cao's son Cao Pi became Prince of Wei after his father's death, he reinstated the three positions. Hua Xin was made Chancellor, Jia Xu was made Grand Commandant and Wang Lang was made Grand Secretary. When Cao Pi founded the Cao Wei dynasty in late 220, Hua Xin was made Cao Wei's first Minister of the Masses, Jia Xu remained as Grand Commandant, and Wang Lang was made the first Minister of Works.

== Overview ==
Each minister was responsible for different areas of government, but the boundaries were often blurred. Together, the Three Ducal Ministers were the emperor's closest advisors.

Starting in the late Shang dynasty and Zhou dynasty, the top three were:

- Grand Preceptor (Chinese: 太師; pinyin: Tàishī);
- Grand Tutor (Chinese: 太傅; pinyin: Tàifù);
- Grand Protector (Chinese: 太保; pinyin: Tàibǎo).

During the Western Han dynasty, the three positions were:

- Chancellor (Chinese: 丞相; pinyin: Chéngxiàng)
- Grand Secretary (Chinese: 御史大夫; pinyin: Yùshǐ Dàfū);
- Grand Commandant (Chinese: 太尉; pinyin: Tàiwèi).

In the Eastern Han dynasty, the names of the Three Ducal Ministers were changed to:

- Minister of War (Chinese: 大司馬; pinyin: Dà Sīmǎ) until 51AD, then Grand Commandant;
- Minister of the Masses (Chinese: 司徒; pinyin: Sītú);
- Minister of Works (Chinese: 司空; pinyin: Sīkōng).

Because all three titles contain the word "司" (pinyin: sī; lit. 'management') at the time of the Eastern Han, the Three Ducal Ministers were also called "Sansī" (三司).

== Rank ==
During the Han dynasty, civil service officials were classified according to twenty grades (reduced to sixteen after 32 BC), expressed by the official's annual salary in terms of number of dàn (石) or Chinese bushels of grain. (Note: probably of wheat, the core of the Chinese Empire at that time being mainly on the North China Plain, above the Yangzi River. Rice came later to the area.) This ranged from the ten-thousand-bushel rank at the top to the one-hundred-bushel at the bottom. Under this system, the Three Ducal Ministers all held the highest rank of ten-thousand-bushel.

== See also ==
- Government of the Han dynasty
- Nine Ministers
- Translation of Han dynasty titles
