= Wang Lang (Cao Wei) =

Chinese official and warlord (died 228)

- 王朗

Minister over the Masses (司徒)
- In office January or February 227 – December 228
- Monarch: Cao Rui
- Preceded by: Hua Xin
- Succeeded by: Dong Zhao

Minister of Works (司空)
- In office 11 December 220 – January or February 227
- Monarch: Cao Pi
- Succeeded by: Chen Qun

Grandee Secretary (御史大夫) (in Cao Pi's vassal kingdom)
- In office 6 April – 11 December 220
- Monarch: Emperor Xian of Han
- Chancellor: Cao Pi

Grand Judge (大理) (in Cao Cao's vassal kingdom)
- In office ?–?
- Monarch: Emperor Xian of Han
- Chancellor: Cao Cao

Minister of Imperial Ancestral Ceremonies (奉常) (in Cao Cao's vassal kingdom)
- In office ?–?
- Monarch: Emperor Xian of Han
- Chancellor: Cao Cao

Minister Steward (少府) (in Cao Cao's vassal kingdom)
- In office ?–?
- Monarch: Emperor Xian of Han
- Chancellor: Cao Cao

Administrator of Kuaiji (會稽太守)
- In office 192 – 196
- Monarch: Emperor Xian of Han
- Succeeded by: Sun Ce

Personal details
- Born: Wang Yan (王嚴) Tancheng County, Shandong
- Died: c.December 228 (Note: Cao Rui's biography in the Sanguozhi recorded that Wang Lang died in the 11th month of the 2nd year of the Taihe era of Cao Rui's reign. This month corresponds to 14 December 228 to 12 January 229 in the Gregorian calendar.)
- Children: Wang Su; two other sons and one daughter
- Occupation: Politician, warlord
- Courtesy name: Jingxing (景興)
- Posthumous name: Marquis Cheng (成侯)
- Peerage: Marquis of Lanling (蘭陵侯)

Wang Lang (died c.December 228), courtesy name Jingxing (景興), was a Chinese politician and minor warlord who lived during the late Eastern Han dynasty of China. He served notably in the Han central government as Administrator of Kuaiji Commandery and in the later state of Cao Wei during the Three Kingdoms period. He was also a maternal great-grandfather of Sima Yan, the founding emperor of the Jin dynasty, through his granddaughter Wang Yuanji's marriage with Sima Zhao.

== Early life and career ==
Wang Lang was from Tan County (郯縣), Donghai Commandery (東海郡), which is around present-day Tancheng County, Shandong. His original given name was "Yan" (嚴) but he changed it to "Lang" (朗) later. He started his career as a Palace Gentleman (郎中) due to his academic proficiency, particularly with the Chinese Classics. When his teacher Yang Ci (楊賜) died in late 185, he left his post and went back to his home county to mourn him. Later, he served Tao Qian, the Governor of Xu Province, where he advised Tao Qian and several other warlords to pledge allegiance to Emperor Xian, citing the Spring and Autumn Annals. Tao Qian then sent an envoy to the Han central government in Chang'an to pledge allegiance to the Emperor, and in return received the appointment "General Calming the East". The Han central government also appointed Wang Lang as the Administrator of Kuaiji Commandery.

== As a warlord ==
During Wang Lang's tenure as Administrator of Kuaiji Commandery, Wang Lang banned the worship of Qin Shi Huang, a widespread custom among locals, believing that he was a ruler without virtue. Wang also formed a secret alliance with the Shanyue tribes. When the warlord Sun Ce started his Jiangdong campaign, Wang Lang financed the Shanyue leader Yan Baihu to fight Sun Ce, but Yan Baihu and the other Shanyue clan leaders lost to Sun Ce; at the time, Liu Yao, another warlord in the Jiangdong region, had also lost to Sun Ce in battle. Yan Baihu had become the head of a loose confederation composed of bandits and local officials, including Wang Lang, and he again gathered soldiers numbering tens of thousands. Despite opposition from his adviser Yu Fan, Wang Lang directly joined Yan Baihu in military operations against Sun Ce's forces, but they were defeated.

Wang Lang then escaped to Dongye (東冶). There, he gained the support from the Chief of Houguan (侯官長) and attempted to rebuild his power with support from Zhang Ya (張雅), a rebel leader with a strong army. They succeeded in killing Han Yan (韓晏), the Commandant of the Southern Region (南部都尉) appointed by Sun Ce, but were ultimately defeated by He Qi, a general under Sun Ce.

Wang Lang tried to go further south to Jiao Province to recuperate, but was caught up and defeated by Sun Ce. He then conducted a very humble speech to appease Sun Ce, who later accepted his surrender.

== Service in Wei ==
Despite surrendering, Wang Lang entered into a self-imposed retirement from public life, refusing Zhang Zhao's request to serve Sun Ce. Eventually he was contacted by one of Cao Cao's spies and was asked to join Cao Cao in the new imperial capital, Xuchang, where the Han central government was based. Although he was initially hesitant, he became convinced after reading a letter from his old friend, Kong Rong, who praised Cao Cao and urged him to go to Xuchang. Thus, he travelled north and reached Xuchang about a year later. Cao Cao highly valued Wang Lang's talent and appointed him as Critical Grandee, and Advisor to the Army of the Excellency of Works. Wang Lang later served in key appointments in Cao Cao's vassal kingdom of Wei after the latter was enfeoffed as a vassal king by the threatened Emperor Xian, the last emperor of the Han dynasty.

In 220, after Cao Cao's death, his son Cao Pi became king, promoting Wang Lang as Censorate Grandee and enfeoffed him as Marquis of Yueping Village. Later that winter, the Emperor was wrongfully forced to abdicate to Cao Pi, who established the state of Cao Wei to replace the Eastern Han dynasty(which was then re-established by Shu Han). After becoming the emperor, Cao Pi appointed Wang Lang as the Minister of Works and enfeoffed him as the Marquis of Anling Precinct. During Cao Pi's reign, Wang Lang made several suggestions regarding both military and civilian matters, such as security and the reduction of the state's employees and expenditures. Cao Pi was proud of his Three Ducal Ministers: Zhong Yao was Grand Commandant, Hua Xin was Minister over the Masses while Wang Lang was Minister of Works. Once, after a court session was dismissed, Cao Pi said to those around him, "These three Ducal Ministers were great men of their generation; future generations can hardly hope to continue their legacies!"

In 226, when Cao Rui came to the throne, he promoted Wang Lang from a district marquis to a county marquis under the title "Marquis of Lanling", increasing his marquisate to 1,700 taxable households, from his previous 1,200.

Wang Lang was later sent to Ye (in present-day Handan, Hebei) to visit the tomb of Empress Wenzhao, Cao Rui's mother. She had yet to be canonized as Empress at that point, so Wang Lang was given the tally and document that permitted him to do so, as well as the proper sacrificial animals for this. A special tomb was to be built for her as well. During his visit, he saw the populace was short on material; thus, he wrote to advise Cao Rui to be frugal, and to reduce the scale of the building of his extravagant palaces and ancestral temples. Wang Lang was later promoted to the position of Minister over the Masses.

== Late life and death ==
After Wang Lang objected to Cao Rui's palace-building project, he noticed that Cao Rui had a small imperial harem and wrote to Cao Rui stating that an emperor should have more concubines in order to continue the imperial bloodline with more offspring. This time, Cao Rui wholeheartedly agreed with Wang Lang and started expanding the size of his imperial harem. Wang's advice had a profound influence: Nine years after Wang Lang's death, Cao Rui even ordered beautiful married women all be formally seized unless their husbands were able to ransom them, and that they would be married to soldiers instead – except that the most beautiful among them would become his concubines. Despite protests from some officials (including Zhang Mao), this decree was apparently carried out, much to the distress of his people.

Wang Lang later focused on academic works and had published several books that were well received at the time. He died in 228 and was given the posthumous title "Marquis Cheng" (成侯), literally meaning "marquis of establishment". (Note: A person who helped to establish a regime or gave comfort to the civilians could be given the posthumous name "Cheng." Wang Lang qualified for the first provision due to his contributions to the establishment of the Cao Wei regime. The rules of assigning posthumous names are detailed in the Lost Book of Zhou.) He was succeeded by his son Wang Su, who continued serving as an official in Wei.

== In Romance of the Three Kingdoms ==
In the 14th-century historical novel Romance of the Three Kingdoms, Wang Lang died at the age of 76 in 228. Despite his age, he led a group of soldiers and set up camp to do battle with Zhuge Liang. In the novel, Cao Zhen was defeated by Zhuge Liang. Cao Zhen called for his subordinates to help, and Wang Lang decided to try to persuade him to surrender (even though Guo Huai was sceptical that it would succeed) and engaged Zhuge Liang in a debate, but was soundly defeated. Zhuge Liang among other things scolded him as a dog and a traitor, from the shock of which he fell off his horse and died on the spot. There is no record of this in history, and instead, it is said that he merely sent a letter to Zhuge Liang recommending that he surrender. The letter was ignored.

== Legacy ==
A famous story of Wang Lang was recorded in A New Account of the Tales of the World:

Both Hua Xin and Wang Lang were fleeing in a boat. One person hoped to board, but Hua Xin was hesitant. Wang Lang said:" Fortunately the boat is still spacious. Why not?" Later, the bandits pursuing them approached, and Wang wanted to abandon the person whom they took along. Hua Xin said: "This is why I was originally hesitant. Now that we have accepted his entrustment of himself, can we abandon him because of emergency?" Therefore they carried and saved him as before. This is how people determined who is better between Hua and Wang.

— Volume 1. Virtuous Conduct, A New Account of the Tales of the World

== See also ==
- Lists of people of the Three Kingdoms
