= Tao Qian =

Tao Qian may refer to:

- Tao Qian (Han dynasty) (132–194), governor of Xu province during the late Han dynasty
- Tao Yuanming (365–427), Jin dynasty poet, also known as Tao Qian
