= Tao Qian (Han dynasty) =

Han dynasty official and warlord (132-194)

- 陶謙

Governor of Xu Province (徐州牧)
- In office 190 – 194
- Monarch: Emperor Xian of Han
- Succeeded by: Liu Bei

General Who Stabilises the East (安東將軍)
- In office 190 – 194
- Monarch: Emperor Xian of Han

Inspector of Xu Province (徐州刺史)
- In office 188 – 190
- Monarchs: Emperor Ling of Han / Emperor Shao of Han / Emperor Xian of Han

Personal details
- Born: 132 or 133 Dangtu County, Anhui
- Died: 194 (aged 62) or 195 (Note: Vol.28 of Houhanji by Yuan Hong recorded that Tao died in the summer of the 2nd year of the Xingping era. Xun Yu's biography in Houhanshu also recorded that Tao died in the 2nd year of the Xingping era. Tao's biography in Houhanshu recorded the same year of death as his biography in Sanguozhi.) Tancheng County, Shandong
- Spouse: Lady Gan (Note: Lady Gan's father was an Administrator of Cangwu.)
- Children: Tao Shang; Tao Ying
- Occupation: Official, warlord
- Courtesy name: Gongzu (恭祖)
- Peerage: Marquis of Liyang (溧陽侯)

Chinese name
- Traditional Chinese: 陶謙
- Simplified Chinese: 陶谦
Transcriptions
Standard Mandarin
- Hanyu Pinyin: Táo Qiān
- Wade–Giles: Tʻao^{2}-Chʻien^{1}
Middle Chinese
- Middle Chinese: dɑu kʰem
Old Chinese
- Zhengzhang: *bl'uː kʰeːm

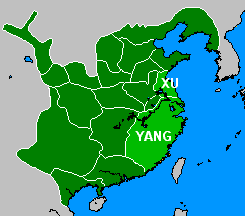
Provinces ruled by Tao Qian in the late 180s

Tao Qian (132–194), courtesy name Gongzu, was a government official and warlord who lived during the late Eastern Han dynasty of China. He is best known for serving as the governor of Xu Province.

== Early life ==
Tao Qian was born in Danyang Commandery (丹楊郡), which is around present-day Ma'anshan, Anhui. His father served as Chief of Yuyao (餘姚長) and died when Tao Qian was still young. As an orphan, he was well known for his daredevil attitude. At the age of 13, he sewed from silk a made-up banner while riding a bamboo horse with all the children from the village following his lead. The Administrator of Cangwu (蒼梧太守), Gan Gong (甘公), (Note: "Gong" here is likely not Gan's name, but a form of address, akin to the English honorific Mr..) who was from the same county by birth, met Tao while travelling. Gan was deeply impressed by Tao's appearance and conversed with him. Gan was further impressed and agreed to have his daughter married to Tao. Gan's wife was displeased and told him angrily, "This Tao kid is a ruffian; why offer him our daughter?" Gan Gong replied that Tao Qian has a unique appearance and will surely accomplish great things in the future. Therefore, he maintained the marriage proposal.

== Civil and military career ==
As a young man, he was known for being studious and honest. While in the service of the Han dynasty, he was nominated as a maocai (茂才) and served as Prefect of Lu (盧縣令). He earned a reputation for his inflexible nature and great virtues. He was nominated as a xiaolian (civil service candidate), served in the secretariat and as Prefect of Shu (舒縣令). The then-Administrator, Zhang Pan (張磐), had served at the same commandery since the previous generation and was friends with Tao Qian's father. Therefore, he was friendly with him, but Tao Qian felt ashamed about being Zhang's subordinate. Later when serving as Prefect (令), Tao treated Zhang Pan with respect, as required by his office. Zhang Pan always wanted to feast with Tao Qian, who would sometimes refuse the invitation. During those feasts, Zhang Pan encouraged Tao Qian to dance; as Tao refused, Zhang would force him. While dancing, Tao Qian would not spin. When Zhang Pan asked him for the reason, he replied that he cannot as it would surpass others. Zhang Pan was irritated at his answer and distanced himself from Tao Qian. When he served in office, Tao Qian was noted for his pure conduct and noble character as he didn't mix private dealings with his duties. As Zhang Pan wasted money on sacrifices, Tao Qian resigned from his post.

When the Yellow Turban Rebellion broke out, he was appointed as the Inspector of You Province (幽州剌史) and served as military advisor to Zhang Wen, and accompanied Zhang to the northwestern frontiers during the Liang Province Rebellion. Around this time, the western tribes were raiding the lands and Huangfu Song was appointed to pacify them. Tao Qian followed him and served as Commandant Who Raises Military (楊武都尉). During this campaign, they greatly defeated the Qiang tribes. As Bian Zhang and Han Sui rebelled, Tao Qian accompanied Zhang Wen. Although well treated, Tao despised Zhang Wen for his tenure in office. During a feast, as the army returned. Zhang Wen ordered Tao Qian to serve wine during which he insulted Zhang Wen along with other military officers. This angered Zhang Wen who exiled Tao Qian to the frontier. Following the advice of his subordinate, he forgave Tao Qian as a way to show his generosity. Tao Qian was convinced to show that he felt sorry for his insult while Zhang Wen received encouragement to resume his good treatment of him. Therefore, their relations started anew.

In the chaos of Dong Zhuo's coup d'état and the battles that followed, Tao Qian was appointed as Inspector of Xu Province (徐州刺史), where remnants of the Yellow Turbans still existed. (Note: In c.November 188, there was a resurgence in Yellow Turban rebels in both Qing and Xu provinces, and they raided numerous counties.) He succeeded in clearing the area of rebel forces and gained control of the neighbouring Yang Province. However, after that he showed no ambition to expand his territory any further. After the failed campaign against Dong Zhuo, Tao Qian sent tributes to the imperial court located at Chang'an and received the titles of General Who Stabilises the East (安東將軍) and Governor of Xu Province (徐州牧) with a peerage as Marquis of Liyang (溧陽侯).

Around this time, the Xu province was secured and prospere with many refugees joining. Tao Qian was responsible for starting the careers of Wang Lang, Zhu Zhi and Chen Deng, all of whom would play fairly important roles in the historical events leading to the end of the Han dynasty. However, at the same time, he was prone to joining forces with unscrupulous characters, such as Ze Rong, Cao Hong (曹宏) and Que Xuan (闕宣), (Note: Tao Qian joining forces with Que Xuan is per Cao Cao's biography in Sanguozhi; The Zizhi Tongjian recorded that contrary to joining forces, Tao actually killed Que. Tao Qian's biographies in both Sanguozhi and Houhanshu recorded that Tao first joined forces with Que before killing him and taking over his troops. ([下邳*(阎)**[阙]*宣自称“天子”，谦始与合从，后遂杀之而并其觿。]; note that Que's surname was also recorded as "Yan" (阎) in Houhanshu). In his annotation to Tongjian, Hu Sanxing cited Sima Guang's Zizhi Tongjian Kaoyi, which commented that given his occupation of Xu Province and his outward loyalty towards the Han imperial court, it is unlikely that Tao would join forces with Que when the latter only has a few thousand troops; Sima's opinion is that Tao's subordinate(s) had joined forces with Que in killing Cao Song, resulting in Cao Cao's retaliatory expedition.) and on the other hand not appointing Zhao Yu (趙昱), a loyal and capable subordinate, to a position of trust. Those who did not respond to his requests to serve him, such as Zhang Zhao and Lü Fan, he had imprisoned, and he also attempted to harm the family of Sun Ce, who was serving Yuan Shu at the time.

== Cao Cao's invasion of Xu Province ==
In 193, Cao Cao's father Cao Song was travelling through Xu Province to join Cao Cao in Yan Province. Tao Qian's subordinate, Zhang Kai (張闓), attacked the baggage train, killing Cao Song and escaping with the loot. The death of Cao Song prompted Cao Cao, then the Governor of Yan province, to lead an army to invade Xu Province and massacre countless civilians – ostensibly to avenge his father. Tao Qian requested aid from his allies in Qing Province, and was joined by Tian Kai, with the reinforcements Tao Qian was able to resist Cao Cao. Cao Cao's forces eventually ran out of supplies and had to withdraw back to Yan Province.

Cao Cao launched a second invasion in 194, but was forced to turn back when Zhang Miao and Chen Gong rebelled against him and helped a rival warlord, Lü Bu, seize control of his base in Yan Province.

== Death and succession ==
Tao Qian died of illness in 194 at the age of 63 (by East Asian age reckoning). His two sons Tao Shang and Tao Ying did not serve in office. Zhang Zhao along with other officials realized a dirge to lament his death as follows:

"Your Lordship, who served as General and Marquis, you had and maintained virtue while directing military and civil matters. All were firm and upright under your guided benevolence. When you served as Prefect of Shu and Lu, you had love for your people; as Inspector of You and Xu, your sweet treatment was for all. As barbarians rose up in the west, you cleanse them. Without you, there would be no peace. As the Emperor heard about your achievements, you received rank and honor accordingly, both title of Governor and peerage as Marquis to propagate your enlightened rule. You answered in kind, General, receiving the title of General Who Stabilises the East, leading your forces to clear troubles, restoring previous offices and altars. However, your years were not eternal and you died suddenly. Losing you, the common people are mourning, knowing difficulty will arise without you whom they relied upon. In just ten days, five commanderies are crumbling. How sad are we, without you, whom can we look for guidance? Memorials cannot reach the Holy Sky. Oh Alas!”

When he was seriously ill, Tao Qian told his subordinate Mi Zhu that only Liu Bei could keep this land safe. After his death, Mi Zhu and Chen Deng invited Liu Bei to be the new Governor of Xu Province. Liu Bei initially declined and offered the governorship to Yuan Shu, but Kong Rong eventually convinced him to accept.

== In Romance of the Three Kingdoms ==
In the 14th-century historical novel Romance of the Three Kingdoms, Tao Qian is described as a ‘warm and sincere man’, and Zhang Kai's attack on Cao Song is depicted as being done against his will. Later, after Liu Bei helps him drive off Cao Cao's invasion, Tao Qian offers Liu Bei the governorship of Xu Province three times, but Liu Bei declines every time, saying that such an action would be seen as dishonourable. In 194, on his death bed, Tao Qian attempts one last time to ask Liu Bei to take over; Liu Bei still refuses his plea. Tao Qian dies peacefully soon after, and Liu Bei finally accepts his dying request after the common people of Xuzhou and his own brothers exhort him to take command.

== Literary and cultural references ==
Tao Qian appears as a playable faction in Total War: Three Kingdoms, and is prominently featured in the game as an optional opponent of Cao Cao, which involves the death of Cao Song.

== See also ==
- Lists of people of the Three Kingdoms

== Bibliography ==
- Chen, Shou (3rd century). Records of the Three Kingdoms (Sanguozhi).
- de Crespigny, Rafe (2007). A biographical dictionary of Later Han to the Three Kingdoms (23–220 AD). Leiden: Brill. ISBN 978-90-04-15605-0.
- Fan, Ye (5th century). Book of the Later Han (Houhanshu).
- Luo, Guanzhong (14th century). Romance of the Three Kingdoms (Sanguo Yanyi).
- Pei, Songzhi (5th century). Annotated Records of the Three Kingdoms (Sanguozhi zhu).
