= Grand Commandant =

Grand Commandant (Chinese: 太尉) is a title referring to the supreme military commander in ancient China, Vietnam and the Korean Peninsula. The earliest recording is on the Master Lü's Spring and Autumn Annals in 205 BC.

During the Western Han, the position was only filled by regents or left vacant. During the Eastern Han, it was one of the Three Excellencies, mostly filled by civilians and dominated the cabinet. The Grand Commandant was also responsible for the supervision of officials.
