= Yang Biao =

Chinese politician (142–225)

- 楊彪

Personal details
- Born: 142 Hongnong Commandery (弘農郡), present-day Lingbao, Henan
- Died: 225 (aged 83) Unknown
- Children: Yang Xiu
- Parent: Yang Ci (楊賜) (father)
- Occupation: Scholar, official

Yang Biao (Chinese: 楊彪; pinyin: Yáng Biāo; 142–225), courtesy name Wenxian (文先), was a Chinese scholar and official who lived during the late Eastern Han dynasty.

Yang Biao was born in 142 to Yang Ci. His father, grandfather, and great-grandfather each had held the title of Excellency during the Han dynasty. His courtesy name is Wenxian. His son was Yang Xiu. Yang Biao died in 225 and is buried in Tongguan County with six relatives.
