= Zhu Jun (Han dynasty) =

Chinese Han dynasty general (died 195)

- 朱儁

Minister of Finance (大司農)
- In office 195
- Monarch: Emperor Xian of Han

Manager of the Affairs of the Masters of Writing (錄尚書事)
- In office c.July 193 – 194
- Monarch: Emperor Xian of Han

Grand Commandant (太尉)
- In office c.July 193 (Note: According to Liu Xie's biography in Book of the Later Han, Zhu Jun was made Grand Commandant and Manager of the Affairs of the Masters of Writing in the 6th month of the 4th year of the Chuping era of his reign. This corresponds to 17 Jul to 14 Aug 193 on the Julian calendar.) – 11 August 194 (Note: According to Liu Xie's biography in Book of the Later Han, Zhu Jun was dismissed as Grand Commandant on the renzi day of the 7th month of the 1st year of the Xingping era of his reign. This corresponds to 11 Aug 194 on the Julian calendar.)
- Monarch: Emperor Xian of Han
- Preceded by: Zhou Zhong
- Succeeded by: Yang Biao

Minister Coachman (太僕)
- In office 192 – 193
- Monarch: Emperor Xian of Han

Intendant of Henan (河南尹)
- In office ?–?
- Monarch: Emperor Ling of Han

Colonel of the City Gates (城門校尉)
- In office ?–?
- Monarch: Emperor Ling of Han

Household Counsellor (光祿大夫)
- In office ?–?
- Monarch: Emperor Ling of Han

Administrator of Henei (河內太守)
- In office ?–?
- Monarch: Emperor Ling of Han

Right General of Chariots and Cavalry (右車騎將軍)
- In office 185 – ?
- Monarch: Emperor Ling of Han

Personal details
- Born: 140s or before Shangyu District, Shaoxing, Zhejiang
- Died: 195 Xi'an, Shaanxi
- Children: Zhu Hao
- Occupation: General, official
- Courtesy name: Gongwei (公偉)
- Peerage: Marquis of Qiantang (錢唐侯)

Zhu Jun (140s? - c.April 195), courtesy name Gongwei, was a military general and official who lived during the Eastern Han dynasty of China.

== Life ==
Zhu Jun was from Shangyu County (上虞縣), Kuaiji Commandery (會稽郡), which is present-day Shangyu District, Shaoxing, Zhejiang. His father died when he was still young, so he was raised by his mother, who earned a living by selling fabrics. When he reached adulthood, he served as a scribe in the local county office. Zhu Jun gained a reputation for being very filial towards his mother. Despite this, when an acquaintance Zhou Gui (周规) was unable to repay his debts to the local authorities, Zhu Jun stole fabrics from his mother in order to help Zhou settle the debts. As a result, Zhu Jun's mother lost her property. Greatly angered, she then blamed Zhu Jun. Zhu Jun replied, "Small losses will result in great fortunes later. To be poor first before becoming rich is the natural order." Du Shang (度尚; 117-166), the Chief of Shangyu County, favoured him and recommended him to serve in the commandery office under Wei Yi (韋毅), the Administrator of Kuaiji Commandery. Zhu Jun later became a Registrar (主簿) when Yin Duan (尹端) replaced Wei Yi as the Administrator. In 173, Yin Duan was impeached for his failure in quelling Xu Chang's rebellion. Initially, Yin's punishment was to be executed. However, Zhu Jun made his way to the capital and bribed the relevant officials; as a result, Yin's punishment was reduced. Yin was overjoyed upon knowing of his reduced punishment, but Zhu Jun never revealed his involvement to Yin.

Yin Duan's successor, Xu Gui (徐珪), further nominated Zhu Jun as a xiaolian (civil service candidate), after which the Han central government appointed Zhu Jun as the Prefect (令) of Lanling County (蘭陵縣).

In c.February 178, when a rebellion broke out in Jiaozhi Commandery in the far south, the Han imperial court appointed Zhu Jun as the Inspector (刺史) of Jiao Province and ordered him to suppress the revolt. Zhu Jun managed to rally some soldiers from his home commandery and gather another 5,000 soldiers from other commanderies to join him in fighting the rebels. He successfully quelled the rebellion and killed the rebel leader Liang Long (梁龍) in Nanhai Commandery (南海郡). In 181, he attacked and defeated Wuhuman (烏滸蠻), another rebel leader in Hepu (合浦) and Jiaozhi commanderies. In recognition of his achievements, the Han imperial court enfeoffed him as a Marquis of a Chief Village (都亭侯) and summoned him to the imperial capital Luoyang to serve as a Counsellor Remonstrant (諫議大夫).

In 184, when the Yellow Turban Rebellion broke out, the Han imperial court appointed Zhu Jun as Right General of the Household (右中郎將) and ordered him, Lu Zhi and Huangfu Song to lead imperial forces to eliminate the rebels. Zhu Jun defeated the rebels at Changshe (長社) with the aid of Huangfu Song and Cao Cao. He was elevated from a village marquis to a district marquis under the title "Marquis of Xi District" (西鄉侯) and was promoted to General of the Household Who Suppresses Rebels (鎮賊中郎將). Zhu Jun and Huangfu Song later joined forces to defeat the rebels at Yangzhai (陽翟) and Xihua (西華) counties and pacified Yu Province. Later, Zhu Jun led his troops south to Nanyang Commandery (南陽郡) and joined the local government forces there in defeating the Yellow Turban rebels led by Zhao Hong (趙弘) and later Han Zhong (韓忠). In early 185, he defeated another group of rebels led by Sun Xia (孫夏) and succeeded in restoring peace in Nanyang Commandery.

In 185, the Han imperial court promoted Zhu Jun to Right General of Chariots and Cavalry (右車騎將軍) and elevated him to a county marquis under the title "Marquis of Qiantang" (錢唐侯). However, after his mother died, he resigned and returned home to perform filial mourning. After the mourning period, he returned to serve as Court Architect (將作大匠) and was subsequently reassigned to be Minister Steward (少府) and Minister Coachman (太僕). In the late 180s, when the Heishan bandits led by Zhang Yan raided Henei Commandery (河內郡) and threatened Luoyang, the Han central government appointed Zhu Jun as the Administrator (太守) of Henei Commandery and ordered him to lead troops to attack the bandits. Zhu Jun subsequently held the following appointments: Household Counsellor (光祿大夫), Colonel of the City Gates (城門校尉) and Intendant of Henan (河南尹).

In 189, the warlord Dong Zhuo took advantage of the political vacuum created in the aftermath of Emperor Ling's death to seize control of, and dominate the Han central government. He felt rather intimidated by Zhu Jun because of the latter's standing in the imperial court as a veteran general and senior official. In 190, when a coalition of warlords launched a campaign against Dong Zhuo in the name of freeing the central government and Emperor Xian from his control, Dong Zhuo became afraid and wanted to relocate the imperial capital from Luoyang to Chang'an in the west. Zhu Jun strongly objected, but Dong Zhuo pushed his plan through. Although he dreaded Zhu Jun and wanted to eliminate him, he still appointed Zhu Jun as Minister Coachman (太僕) in Emperor Xian's name. Zhu Jun rejected the appointment.

After Dong Zhuo left for Chang'an with Emperor Xian, the emperor's subjects and Luoyang's residents, Zhu Jun remained in Luoyang and maintained contact with the anti-Dong Zhuo coalition. However, he feared that Dong Zhuo would turn back and attack him, so he abandoned his post and fled south to Jing Province. Dong Zhuo then appointed Yang Yi (楊懿) as the Intendant of Henan to guard Luoyang. When Zhu Jun heard about it, he led troops from Jing Province to attack Luoyang and drive away Yang Yi. At the time, much of Luoyang had been burnt down when Dong Zhuo gave orders to relocate the imperial capital to Chang'an, so Zhu Jun moved to a garrison at Zhongmu County (中牟縣).

Zhu Jun contacted various regional officials and warlords and asked them to join him in attacking Dong Zhuo. Tao Qian, the Governor of Xu Province, sent troops to help Zhu Jun, and even recommended Zhu Jun to be acting General of Chariots and Cavalry (車騎將軍) to lead the operations. However, Zhu Jun was defeated by Dong Zhuo's subordinates Li Jue and Guo Si in battle, so he could not advance further west and remained in Zhongmu County.

In May 192, Dong Zhuo was assassinated in Chang'an by his subordinate Lü Bu, after which the Han central government came under Wang Yun's control. However, within months, Dong Zhuo's former followers (led by Li Jue and Guo Si) attacked Chang'an and seized control of the central government. At the time, Zhu Jun was still stationed in Zhongmu County. Tao Qian contacted other regional officials and warlords (including Kong Rong, Ying Shao and Zheng Xuan) and proposed naming Zhu Jun as Grand Preceptor (太師) to lead them to attack Chang'an and free Emperor Xian from Li Jue and Guo Si's control. At the same time, Li Jue and Guo Si also tried to win Zhu Jun over to their side. With advice from Zhou Zhong (周忠, an uncle of Zhou Yu) and Jia Xu, they sent him an imperial edict in Emperor Xian's name, ordering him to head to Chang'an and serve as Minister Coachman (太僕) in the central government. Although Zhu Jun knew that it was a ploy by Li Jue and Guo Si, he still obeyed the edict because it was sent in the emperor's name. Zhu also thought that Li, Guo and Fan Chou were short-sighted and prone to in-fighting; he would be able to help the emperor if he went to the central government.

In c.July 193, Zhu Jun replaced Zhou Zhong as Grand Commandant (太尉) and held an additional appointment as Manager of the Affairs of the Masters of Writing (錄尚書事). In the following year, he was removed from office and reassigned to be acting General of Agile Cavalry (驃騎將軍) to guard Hangu Pass. In early 195, before Zhu Jun left for Hangu Pass, internal conflict broke out between Li Jue and Guo Si, who started attacking each other in the streets of Chang'an. Zhu Jun remained in Chang'an and was reassigned to be Minister of Finance (大司農). During this time, Li Jue took Emperor Xian hostage to threaten Guo Si, while Guo Si did the same by holding the emperor's subjects hostage to threaten Li Jue. Zhu Jun, Yang Biao and Emperor Xian's other subjects tried to persuade Guo Si to make peace with Li Jue, but Guo Si would not listen. Zhu Jun died of illness a few days later as he could not stand the humiliation of being held hostage.

== Family ==
Zhu Jun had a son, Zhu Hao (朱皓), whose courtesy name was Wenming (文明). Zhu Hao served as the Administrator of Yuzhang Commandery (豫章郡). He met his end at the hands of Ze Rong in the same year his father died.

== In Romance of the Three Kingdoms ==
Zhu Jun is a character in the 14th-century historical novel Romance of the Three Kingdoms.

== See also ==
- Lists of people of the Three Kingdoms
- Chen, Shou (3rd century). Records of the Three Kingdoms (Sanguozhi).
- Fan, Ye (5th century). Book of the Later Han (Houhanshu).
- Luo, Guanzhong (14th century). Romance of the Three Kingdoms (Sanguo Yanyi).
- Pei, Songzhi (5th century). Annotated Records of the Three Kingdoms (Sanguozhi zhu).
