= Sun Ce =

Chinese Eastern Han general, politician and warlord (175–200)

- 孫策
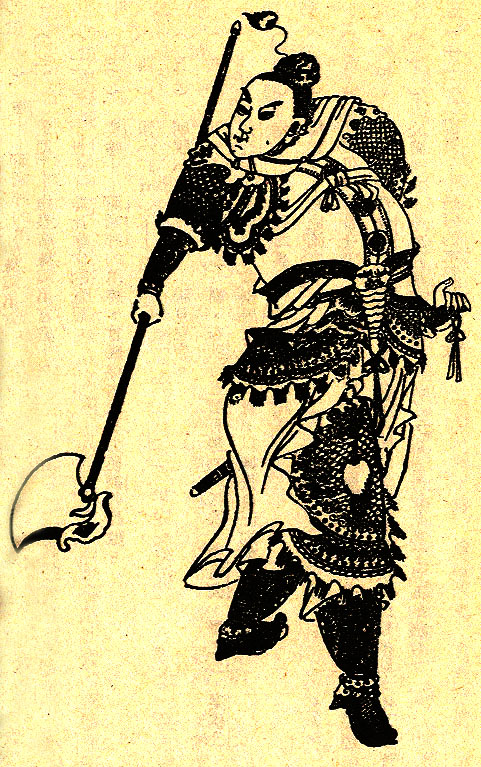
- A Qing dynasty illustration of Sun Ce as depicted in the Wu Shuang Pu (無雙譜, Table of Peerless Heroes) by Jin Guliang

General Who Attacks Rebels (討逆將軍)
- In office 198 – 200
- Monarch: Emperor Xian of Han

Administrator of Kuaiji (會稽太守)
- In office 197 – 198
- Monarch: Emperor Xian of Han
- Preceded by: Wang Lang

Personal details
- Born: 175
- Died: 5 May 200 (aged 24-25) (Note: Sun Ce's biography in the Sanguozhi recorded that he died at the age of 26 (by East Asian age reckoning) in the 5th year of the Jian'an era (196–220) of the reign of Emperor Xian of Han. Pei Songzhi added an annotation from Yu Xi's Zhilin in Sun Ce's biography whereby Yu calculated that Sun died on the 4th day of the 4th month of that year, which corresponds to 5 May 200 in the Julian calendar.) Dangtu County, Wu Commandery (modern day Zhenjiang, Jiangsu)
- Spouse: Da Qiao
- Children: Sun Shao; Lu Xun's wife; Gu Shao's wife; Zhu Ji's wife
- Parents: Sun Jian (father); Empress Wulie (mother)
- Relatives: See Eastern Wu family trees
- Occupation: General, politician, warlord
- Courtesy name: Bofu (伯符)
- Peerage: Marquis of Wu (吳侯)

Military service
- Allegiance: Yuan Shu's forces Han Empire; Wu
- Battles/wars: Conquests in Jiangdong; Campaign against Yuan Shu
Posthumous name
- Prince Huan of Changsha (長沙桓王)

Sun Ce (Chinese: 孫策; pinyin: Sūn Cè; Wade–Giles: Sun^{1} Ts‘ê^{4}) (175 – 5 May 200), courtesy name Bofu, was a Chinese military general, politician, and warlord who lived during the late Eastern Han dynasty of China. He was the eldest child of Sun Jian, who was killed during the Battle of Xiangyang when Sun Ce was only 16. Sun Ce then broke away from his father's overlord, Yuan Shu, and headed to the Jiangdong region in southern China to establish his own power base there. With the help of several people, such as Zhang Zhao and Zhou Yu, Sun Ce managed to lay down the foundation of the state of Eastern Wu during the Three Kingdoms period.

In 200, when the warlord Cao Cao was at war with his rival Yuan Shao in the Battle of Guandu, Sun Ce was rumoured to be planning an attack on Xuchang, Cao Cao's base. However, he was assassinated before he could carry out the plan. Sun Ce was posthumously honoured as "Prince Huan of Changsha" (長沙桓王) by his younger brother Sun Quan when the latter became the founding emperor of Eastern Wu.

Chen Shou's Records of the Three Kingdoms (Sanguozhi) describes Sun Ce as a handsome man who was full of laughter. He was also a generous and receptive man who employed people according to their abilities. As such, his subjects were willing to risk their lives for him. One detractor named Xu Gong, in a letter to Emperor Xian, compared Sun Ce to Xiang Yu, the warrior-king who overthrew the Qin dynasty. As a result, Sun Ce was also referred to as the "Little Conqueror" in popular culture. Sun Ce is depicted in the Wu Shuang Pu (無雙譜, Table of Peerless Heroes) by Jin Guliang.

== Early life and career ==
Born in 175, Sun Ce was the eldest son of Sun Jian, a military general serving under the Eastern Han dynasty. In 190, a year after Emperor Ling died, the warlord Dong Zhuo usurped power, placing in the throne the puppet Emperor Xian. Regional warlords in eastern China then launched a campaign against Dong Zhuo. Sun Jian rendered his service to Yuan Shu, one of the leaders of the coalition. The attempt to oust Dong Zhuo soon failed and China slid into a series of massive civil wars. In the next year, Sun Jian was sent by Yuan Shu to attack Liu Biao, governor of Jing Province, but he was killed in an ambush.

Sun Ce brought his father's body to Qu'e (曲阿; present-day Danyang, Jiangsu) for burial and settled his mother down before heading for Danyang, where his maternal uncle Wu Jing was the governor. There he raised a small militia a few hundred in strength. This small force was far from sufficient for him to establish his own power so in 194 Sun Ce went to Yuan Shu. Yuan Shu was very impressed with Sun Ce and often lamented that he had no son like him. He also returned Sun Jian's former division of troops to Sun Ce.

Initially, Yuan Shu promised to appoint Sun Ce the governor of Jiujiang but eventually gave the governorship to Chen Ji (陳紀). Later, when Yuan Shu was denied a large loan of grains from the governor of Lujiang, he sent Sun Ce to attack the latter, promising to make Sun Ce the governor of Lujiang should he succeed. When Sun Ce did, however, Yuan Shu again went back on his words and appointed someone else instead. The disappointed Sun Ce then began to contemplate leaving.

Meanwhile, Liu Yao, who was by imperial decree the governor of Yang Province, occupied Qu'e as the regional seat Shouchun was already occupied by Yuan Shu. He then forced Wu Jing back west across the Yangtze River to Liyang (歷陽; present-day He County, Anhui). However, Yuan Shu claimed to be the rightful governor and sent Wu Jing and Sun Ce's cousin Sun Ben to attack Liu Yao. After they were unable to break down Liu Yao's defences for more than a year, Sun Ce requested to lead forces to assist the effort.

== Conquest of Wu territory ==
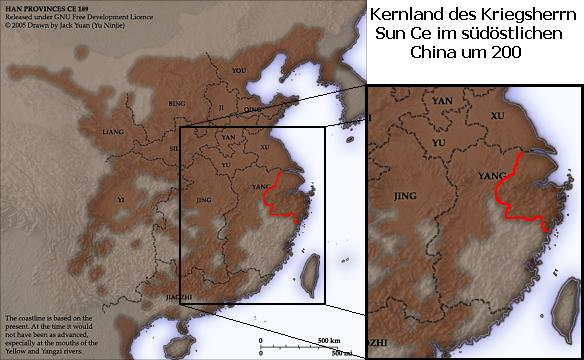
Sun Ce's territory around 200 CE

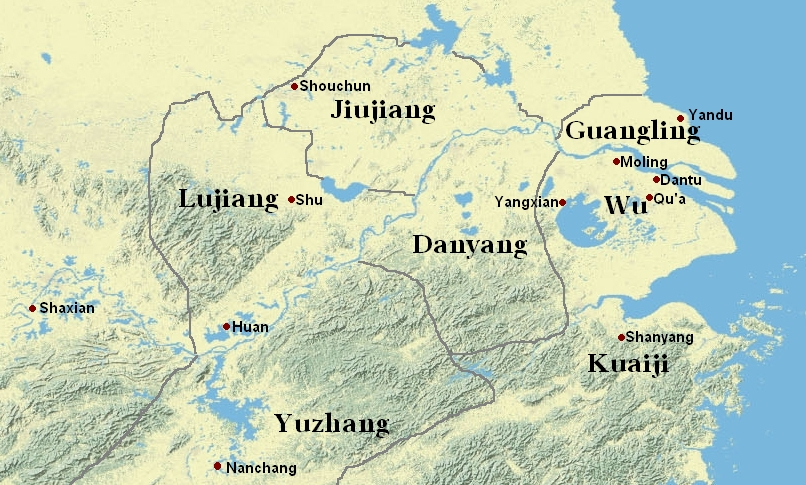
The northern part of Yang Province where Sun Ce was active in detail. Several locales of relevance are pinpointed on this map.

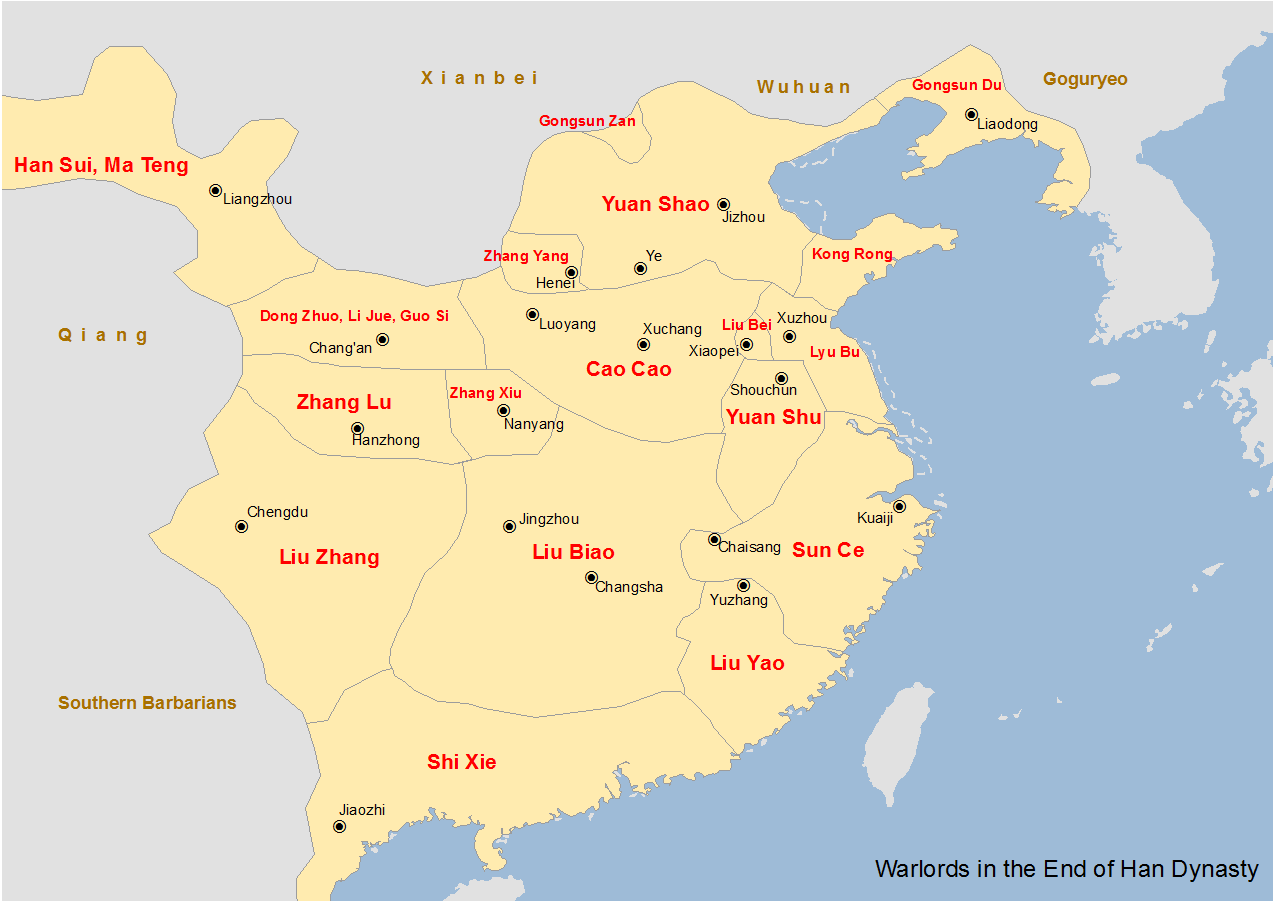
Map showing the major warlords of the Han dynasty in the 190s, including Sun Ce

Though Yuan Shu knew Sun Ce intended to leave, he believed the latter would not be able to defeat Liu Yao. Thus he deployed the young general off with merely a thousand odd troops and a tiny cavalry force. Along with a few hundred more willing followers, Sun Ce proceeded to Liyang, where he boosted his strength to more than 5,000. He then launched an offensive across the Yangtze River and successfully occupied the strategic position of Niuzhu (牛渚; southwest of present-day Ma'anshan, Anhui) in 195.

Two of Liu Yao's allies then came south from Pengcheng and Xiapi respectively to aid him. Sun Ce chose to first attack one of them, Ze Rong, who made camp south of Moling. After suffering initial defeat in the hands of the aggressor, Ze Rong fell back in defence and refused to engage in battle. Sun Ce then marched further north and attacked Xue Li (薛禮) in Moling. Although Xue Li soon gave up the city and escaped, Liu Yao's subordinate Fan Neng (樊能) and others had regrouped their forces and launched a renewed attack on Niuzhu. Turning back, Sun Ce defeated Fan Neng and secured Niuzhu. He then began a second offensive against Ze Rong. However, he was struck by a stray arrow in the thigh. Returning to Niuzhu, he sent out false words that he was killed in battle. The exulted Ze Rong then sent a force to attack. Sun Ce led the enemies into an ambush and annihilated them. When Ze Rong heard that Sun Ce was still alive, he further reinforced his defences.

Sun Ce then temporarily gave up attacking Ze Rong and focused his forces on Qu'e. After all the surrounding areas were taken over by Sun Ce, Liu Yao gave up the city and escaped south to Nanchang, capital of Yuzhang Commandery, where he died later. Hua Xin, administrator of Yuzhang, joined Sun's forces. As Sun Ce implemented strict discipline among his troops, he won the instant support of the local people and gathered many talented men, such as Chen Wu, Zhou Tai, Jiang Qin, Zhang Zhao, Zhang Hong, Qin Song, and Lü Fan. He then pushed his force deeper into Yang Province and conquered Kuaiji along the southern shore of Hangzhou Bay, whose governor Wang Lang surrendered. Sun Ce made Kuaiji his base city and struck out at the wandering bandit army led by Yan Baihu. Yan Baihu sent his younger brother Yan Yu (嚴輿) to offer Sun Ce a position alongside Yan Baihu, but Sun Ce showed no mercy and personally slew the emissary. As Yan Yu was known among Yan Baihu's men as a fierce warrior, his death struck fear into their hearts and they were soon defeated. Sun Ce then appointed his relatives and a trusted subject to govern Danyang and Yuzhang, from which he divided a new commandery named Luling (廬陵). His campaign, from the occupation of Niuzhu to the conquest of the entire region southeast of the Long River, took less than a year. He then defeated and received the services of Zu Lang (祖郎), the Chief of Danyang, and Taishi Ci, the leader of the remnants of Liu Yao's forces; he then urged the surrender of Hua Xin, another one of the remnants of Liu Yao's forces. Thus, with the exception of the scattered but still numerous army of Yan Baihu, the lands south of the Yangtze were mostly pacified.

The barbarians of Shanyue tribe, however, were not easily dealt with. To counter the frequent rebellions of the Shanyue (who would continue to rebel for many years), Sun Ce appointed He Qi to a military rank with orders to subdue the Shanyue. He Qi became a highly successful general later; truly, his appointment by Sun Ce was the first important step to Wu's eventual subjugation of the Shanyue.

== Later life ==
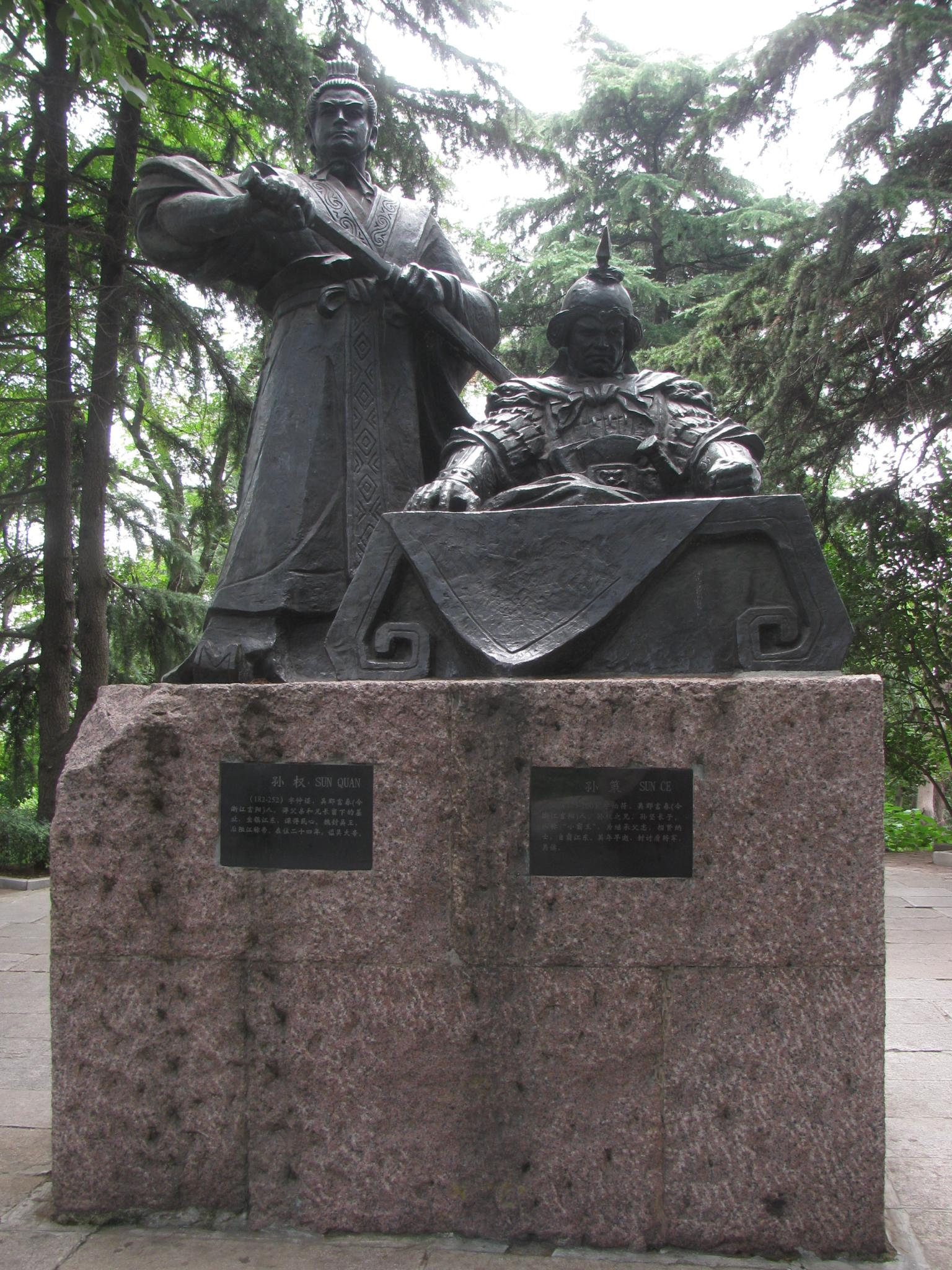
Statues of Sun Ce (right) and Sun Quan (left)

In 197, Yuan Shu declared himself emperor – an act deemed treasonous against the Han dynasty. In a letter to Yuan Shu, Sun Ce denounced the move and broke ties with the former. In an effort to garner support from Sun Ce, the rising warlord Cao Cao then recommended him to be appointed General Who Attacks Rebels (討逆將軍) and enfeoffed as the Marquis of Wu (吳侯). (Note: Sun Ce was supposed to inherit his father's peerage "Marquis of Wucheng" but he gave it to his younger brother, Sun Kuang.) In 199, Yuan Shu died of sickness along with his short-lived Zhong dynasty. His cousin Yuan Yin (袁胤) feared Cao Cao and gave up Shouchun. Bringing along Yuan Shu's coffin and his former troops, he headed to Wan County (皖縣; present-day Qianshan County, Anhui) to seek refuge under Liu Xun (劉勳). As Liu Xun had insufficient food supplies in his realm to support the additional troops, he led a force south to pillage Haihun (海昏; east of present-day Yongxiu County, Jiangxi).

Sun Ce was en route to attack Huang Zu in Xiakou when he received the news. He then turned back and captured the poorly-defended Wan County, taking over all of Yuan Shu's 30,000 former troops. Hearing that his base city had been taken, Liu Xun headed west and sought help from Huang Zu, who sent a 5,000-strong naval force to assist him. Sun Ce pressed forward and defeated Liu Xun, who escaped north to Cao Cao. Sun Ce annexed more than 2,000 former troops and 1,000 ships of his enemy and came upon Huang Zu. Despite reinforcements from Liu Biao, Huang Zu was utterly defeated. During the battle, Sun Ce slew Liu Biao's officer, Han Xi (韓希), and completely routed Huang Zu's son, Huang She (黃射). (Note: The Wu Lu recorded a memorial which Sun Ce submitted to the Han court. In it, Sun wrote that his forces reached Shaxian on the 8th day of the 12th month of that year (corresponding to 11 Jan 200 in the Julian calendar), and that the battle began on the 11th day (14 Jan 200).)

The victorious Sun Ce in 199/early 200 looked poised to take over the entire southern China. As he was threatened by rival Yuan Shao in the north and could not divide his attention, Cao Cao attempted to further reinforce the alliance with Sun Ce by marrying the daughter of his relative Cao Ren to Sun Ce's youngest brother Sun Kuang. Sun Ce in turn agreed to marry Sun Ben's daughter to Cao Cao's son Cao Zhang.

The former administrator of Wu Commandery, Xu Gong, had long opposed Sun Ce. Xu Gong wrote to Emperor Xian, recommending the emperor to summon Sun Ce to the capital as he deemed Sun Ce to be a hero comparable to Xiang Yu and too dangerous to be allowed to occupy a territory. However, the letter was intercepted by an official loyal to Sun Ce, who attacked and then had Xu Gong executed. Xu Gong's former servants then kept a low profile and waited for chance to revenge.

In the year 200, Cao Cao engaged in the decisive Battle of Guandu with Yuan Shao along the shores of the Yellow River, leaving the capital and his base city Xuchang poorly guarded. Sun Ce is said to have then plotted to attack Xuchang under the banner of rescuing Emperor Xian, who was a figurehead under Cao Cao's control. Preparations were underway for the military excursion when Sun Ce ran into three former servants of Xu Gong during a solo hunting trip. One of them managed to plant an arrow into Sun Ce's cheek before Sun Ce's men arrived and slew the assassins. Many differing accounts of Sun Ce's death exist (see below). One generally accepted scenario is that he died that same night.

Another possible scenario has Sun Ce living for quite some time. The physician told Sun Ce to rest still for a hundred days to allow the wound to heal, but Sun Ce looked into the mirror one day and, seeing his scar, became so enraged that he slammed his table. The large movement caused the wound to break and he died in the same night. Although he was survived by one son, Sun Ce passed his legacy to his younger brother, Sun Quan. When Sun Quan declared himself emperor of the state of Eastern Wu in 222, he honoured Sun Ce with the posthumous title "Prince Huan of Changsha" (長沙桓王).

Sun Ce was succeeded by a posthumous son, Sun Shao (孫紹), as well as at least two (possibly three) daughters, married to Gu Shao and later Zhu Ji (朱紀), and Lu Xun respectively. Sun Shao bore one son, Sun Feng (孫奉), who was executed by Sun Hao for alleged treason due to his popularity.

== Dispute over cause of death ==
Sun Sheng (孫盛) in his Exposition on Disparities and Similarities (異同評) discounted the theory that Sun Ce made plans to attack Xuchang. He believed that although Sun Ce was a rising power, he was threatened in the west by Huang Zu, who was defeated but not eliminated, in the north by Chen Deng, governor of Guangling Commandery, and in the south by indigenous tribes yet to be assimilated. These prevented Sun Ce from striking far out at Xuchang and moving the emperor to southeastern China. He further argued that Sun Ce died on the fifth day in the fourth month of 200, before the Battle of Guandu even took place.

Pei Songzhi, who annotated the Records of the Three Kingdoms, rebutted Sun Sheng, arguing that Huang Zu was newly broken and had yet to recollect his forces while the indigenous tribes were scattered and not much of a threat. Pei Songzhi believed that the first objective of Sun Ce's planned northward excursion was to attack Chen Deng, which would provide a platform for capturing Xuchang. On the other hand, Cao Cao and Yuan Shao had been engaging in skirmishes and small-scale battles before Sun Ce's death. Thus, there was in fact no discrepancy in timing. (Note: In his Zizhi Tongjian Kaoyi, Sima Guang opinioned that people of the time widely predicted that Sun would attack Xuchang after he began stationing troops along the Yangtze.)

A historically implausible legend regarding Sun Ce's death involves a highly respected Taoist priest of his time, Gan Ji (干吉), whom he condemned as a sorcerer due to his popularity. Despite petitions from his subjects and his own mother, Sun Ce ordered Gan Ji's execution. According to In Search of the Supernatural (搜神記) by Gan Bao (干竇), a compilation largely based on legends and hearsay, Sun Ce began to see apparitions of Gan Ji ever since the execution of the latter. After he was injured by assassins, Sun Ce was told by the physician to rest still to allow the wound to heal. However, he looked into the mirror one day and saw Gan Ji's face, whereupon he let out a cry and slammed the mirror. His wound broke and he died shortly. This version was adopted and further dramatised in the 14th-century historical novel Romance of the Three Kingdoms, in which Gan Ji's name was taken to be "Yu Ji" (于吉). (Note: The Chinese characters for "Gan" (干) and "Yu" (于) in this case look very similar. It is believed that Luo Guanzhong made an error when referring to historical texts.)

== Literary depictions ==
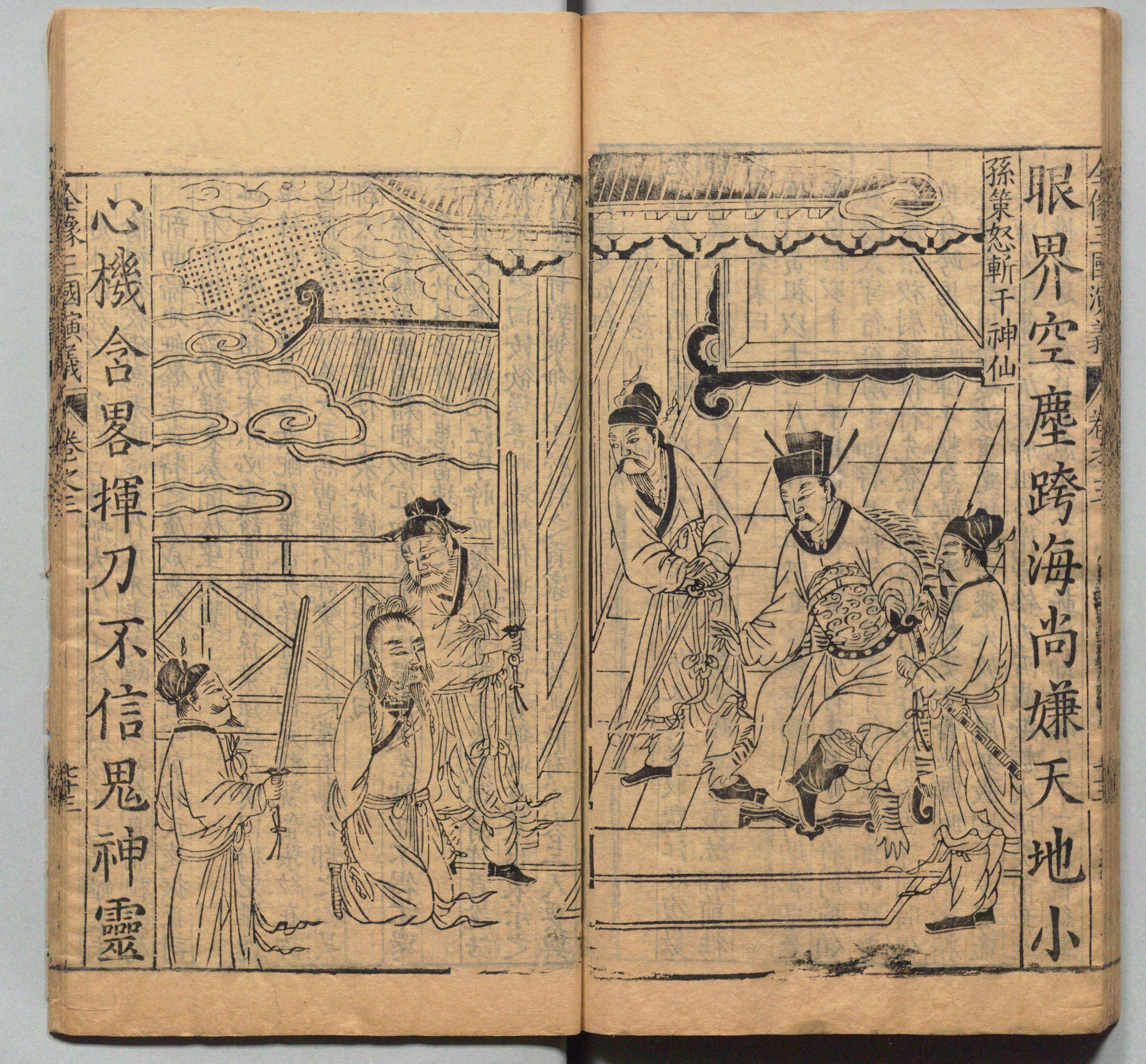
Illustration from a 1591 edition of Romance of the Three Kingdoms depicting Sun Ce ordering the execution of Yu Ji. Flooding caused by the rain summoned by Yu Ji is indicated at the upper left.

The story of Sun Ce and Yu Ji in Romance of the Three Kingdoms was included in a portion of Chapter 29 referred to as Sun Ce’s Angry Beheading of Yu Ji. In it, Sun Ce is incensed by the many admirers of the Taoist, Yu Ji, who believed that he had supernatural powers. Sun Ce arrests Yu Ji and builds a pyre to burn him alive unless he can bring rain by noon that day. When a torrent of rain materializes, he has Yu Ji beheaded in frustration. His reckless cruelty stirs dissension, and his mother convinces him to erect a shrine to Yu Ji to appease it. Nevertheless, he continues to be haunted by Yu Ji's shadow, which eventually leads to his mental breakdown and death due the reopening of an leg wound from a poisoned arrow.

British sinologists such as Joseph Edkins, C. H. Brewitt-Taylor and Francis Lister Hawks Pott commented and translated sections from the Mao version of the novel. Edkins, the first English translator, was a missionary in Shanghai and his work was published in a Chinese textbook titled Chinese Conversations in a bilingual Chinese-English format in 1852.

French author, Théodore Pavie published a translation,Yu-Ki le magicien, légende chinoise [Yu-Ki the Magician, Chinese Legend], in a journal in 1851, which was republished in a collection of novellas in 1853. It was based on a Manchu translation of the novel. He reframed the story as one told on board ship to curious passengers by a missionary. He concludes the story with a question from the passengers (loose translation):

"Shadow of the sorcerer? So you believe in the power of magicians, like your Chinese?"
"You misunderstood me," replied the abbot, closing his book; "he [Sun Ce] was defeated by a powerful and implacable enemy," I said, "by the remorse of having caused the death, in a fit of anger and jealous pride, of a poor dreamer, an innocent madman!"

— Théodore Pavie (1851, 1853).

As highlighted by journal articles by Yuan Si, Paul Heyse, Germany's first Nobel laureate in Literature, reconstructed the story as a narrative poem, König und Magier [King and Magician] (1856, republished in 1864). Heyse lauds Sun Ce as "like a lion, opening its jaws, making all beasts tremble and submit in silence; our king is great beyond measure ... ". He also imbues Sun Ce with a Christan ideology leading him to view Yu Ji as a heretic. Furthermore, he makes Sun Ce more sympathetic by giving him an inner monolog. For example, on his way to Yu Ji's shrine that he was forced to erect, he mutters grinding his teeth (loose translation):

Into the swamp of lies I sink deeper, even as I try to escape it.
Is the only penance for rejecting hypocrites
To become a hypocrite?

— Paul Heyse (1856, 1864)

== In popular culture ==
=== Chinese opera ===
In Peking opera, Sun Ce's role is usually that of a hero or tragic hero, while his brother, Sun Quan is usually portrayed as a villain at worst or self-seeking at best. Several operas even toy with the idea that Sun Quan had Sun Ce assassinated so that he could take control of the warlord state, though there is no historical evidence to support this view. In the opera Fenghuang Er Qiao, Sun Ce borrows 3,000 troops from Yuan Shu and allies with the Qiao army, which is led by the Two Qiaos. Sun Ce, the protagonist of the opera, eventually gains Da Qiao's hand in marriage through a martial arts contest with the help of Zhou Yu and Xiao Qiao.

=== Film and television ===
In the 1983 Shaw Brothers Studio film The Weird Man, Sun Ce has Yu Ji executed and the sorcerer becomes a vengeful ghost. In this film, Sun Ce is portrayed as the anti-hero and Yu Ji as the hero due to the controversy between them in the novel. The 1993 Hong Kong film Ninja in Ancient China is also adapted from this story, except that Yu Ji's apprentices try to avenge him in this film.

Sha Yi portrayed Sun Ce in the 2010 Chinese television series Three Kingdoms.

=== Comics and anime ===
In the anime Yokoyama Mitsuteru Sangokushi, Sun Ce fights alongside his father against Dong Zhuo and is befriended by Liu Bei, Guan Yu, and Zhang Fei, with whom he trains to become a hero.

The protagonist of the manga/anime Ikki Tousen, Sonsaku Hakufu, is loosely based on the historical figure Sun Ce ("Sonsaku Hakufu" being the Japanese reading of Sun Ce's name and courtesy name). Her guardian, Shuuyu Koukin, bears the same name and personality as Zhou Yu.

In the anime Kōtetsu Sangokushi, Sun Ce is portrayed as a once kind-hearted and virtuous hero who was corrupted by the power of the Imperial Seal, causing him to kill its protector.

In the Chinese manhua The Ravages of Time, Sun Ce is a cunning, ruthless and manipulative character.

=== Video games ===
Sun Ce appears in Koei's Romance of the Three Kingdoms strategy game series.

Sun Ce is featured as a playable character in Koei's Dynasty Warriors video game series, as well as Warriors Orochi, a crossover between Dynasty Warriors and Samurai Warriors.

Sun Ce appears as a recruitable ally in Team Ninja's Wo Long: Fallen Dynasty, also published by Koei.

Sun Ce is also a legendary character in Creative Assembly's Total War: Three Kingdoms, the 12th mainline instalment in the Total War video games series.

Sun Ce is also a playable character in the fighting game Sango Fighter 2.

=== Card games ===
In the collectible card game Magic: The Gathering there is a card named "Sun Ce, Young Conqueror", in the Portal Three Kingdoms set.

== See also ==
- Lists of people of the Three Kingdoms
- Eastern Wu family trees

== Notes ==
Prince Huan of Changsha House of Sun Born: 175 Died: 200
Chinese nobility
New creation	Marquis of Wu; 198 – 200	Succeeded by Sun Shao
