= List of people of the Three Kingdoms (Z) =

The following is a partial list of people significant to the Three Kingdoms period (220–280) of Chinese history. Their romanised names start with the letter Z.

== Z ==
Name	Courtesy name	Birth year	Death year	Ancestral home (present-day location)	Role	Allegiance	Previous allegiance(s)	Notes
Zang Ai 臧艾				Hua County, Taishan (Fangcheng Town, Fei County, Shandong)	Politician	Cao Wei		
Zang Ba 臧霸	Xuangao 宣高			Hua County, Taishan (Fangcheng Town, Fei County, Shandong)	General	Cao Wei	Tao Qian, Lü Bu	Sanguozhi vol. 18.
Zang Hong 臧洪	Ziyuan 子源	160	196	Yeyang, Guangling (Huai'an, Jiangsu)	General, warlord	Zang Hong	Zhang Chao, Yuan Shao	Houhanshu vol. 58; Sanguozhi vol. 7.
Zang Jie 臧戒				Hua County, Taishan (Fangcheng Town, Fei County, Shandong)	Prison guard	Han dynasty		
Zang Jun 臧均				Huaiyin, Linhuai (Huai'an, Jiangsu)		Eastern Wu		
Zang Min 臧旻				Yeyang, Guangling (Huai'an, Jiangsu)	Politician	Han dynasty		
Zang Quan 臧權				Hua County, Taishan (Fangcheng Town, Fei County, Shandong)	Politician	Cao Wei		
Zang Shun 臧舜	Taibo 太伯			Hua County, Taishan (Fangcheng Town, Fei County, Shandong)	Politician	Jin dynasty	Cao Wei, Lü Bu	
Zang Xuan 臧宣					Politician	Han dynasty		
Zao Chuzhong 棗處中				Yingchuan County, Changshe (Changge, Henan)	Politician	Cao Wei		
Zao Ju 棗據	Daoyan 道彥			Yingchuan County, Changshe (Changge, Henan)	Politician	Jin dynasty		
Zao Zhao 棗趙	Shu Yi 叔禕			Yingchuan County, Changshe (Changge, Henan)	Politician	Cao Wei		
Zao Zhi 棗祗				Yingchuan County, Changshe (Changge, Henan)	General	Cao Cao		
Ze Rong 笮融			195	Danyang (Xuancheng, Anhui)	Occultist, General	Ze Rong	Tao Qian	Sanguozhi vol. 49.
Zeng Xia 曾夏				Nanhai County, Jieyang (Jieyang, Guangdong)	Rebel leader	Eastern Wu		
Zezi 笮咨					Politician	Goguryeo		
Zhai Dan 翟丹					General	Cao Wei	Eastern Wu	
Zhai Su 翟素								
Zhai Wenyao 翟文耀								
Zhan Lian 詹廉					Politician	Eastern Wu		
Zhan Qian 棧潛	Yanhuang 彥皇			Rencheng (Jining, Shandong)	Politician	Cao Wei		
Zhan Qiang 詹強					Rebel leader		Han dynasty	
Zhan Yan 詹晏					General	Shu Han		
Empress Zhang 張皇后			254	Gaoling, Pingyi	Empress	Cao Wei		
Empress Zhang 張皇后			237	Zhuo (Zhuozhou, Hebei)	Empress, Liu Shan's first wife	Shu Han		Sanguozhi vol. 34.
Empress Zhang 張皇后				Zhuo (Zhuozhou, Hebei)	Empress, Liu Shan's second wife	Shu Han		Sanguozhi vol. 34.
Zhang Ba 張霸			226		General	Sun Quan		
Zhang Bai 張白				Wu County (Suzhou, Jiangsu)		Eastern Wu		
Zhang Baiqi 張白騎					General	Zhang Yan		
Zhang Bao 張寶			184	Julu (Pingxiang County, Hebei)	Rebel leader	Yellow Turban rebels		Houhanshu vol. 08, 71.
Zhang Bao 張苞				Gaoping, Anding (Guyuan, Ningxia)	Politician	Han dynasty		
Zhang Bao 張苞					General	Li Jue	Dong Zhuo	
Zhang Bao 張苞				Zhuo (Zhuozhou, Hebei)	General	Shu Han		
Zhang Biao 張表	Boda 伯達			Shu county (Chengdu, Sichuan)	General	Shu Han		
Zhang Bin 張邠					Politician	Eastern Wu		
Zhang Bing 張秉	Zhongjie 仲節			Yangxian, Wu County (Yixing, Jiangsu)		Eastern Wu		
Zhang Bu 張布			264		General	Eastern Wu		
Zhang Can 張參				Xiuwu, Henei (Xinxiang, Huojia County, Henan)	Politician	Cao Wei		
Zhang Chang 張昶	Wenshu 文舒			Hongnong (Lingbao City, Henan)	Calligrapher			
Zhang Chang 張敞					General	Gongsun Kang		
Zhang Changpu 張昌蒲		199	257	Zishi, Taiyuan (Fenyang, Shanxi)		Cao Wei		
Zhang Chao 張超	Zibing 子并			Mo County, Hejian (North of Renqiu, Hebei)	Scholar, general	Han dynasty		Houhanshu vol. 80. (Part.2)
Zhang Chao 張超			195	Shouzhang County (Dongping County, Shandong)	Politician	Lü Bu	Han dynasty, Zhang Miao	
Zhang Cheng 張承	Zhongsi 仲嗣	178	244	Pengcheng (Xuzhou, Jiangsu)	General, politician	Eastern Wu		Sanguozhi vol. 52.
Zhang Cheng 張承	Gongxian 公先		215	Xiuwu, Henei (Xinxiang, Huojia County, Henan)	Politician	Cao Cao	Han dynasty, Yuan Shu	Sanguozhi vol. 11.
Zhang Cheng 張晟				Henei County (Wuzhi County, Henan)	Bandit leader			
Zhang Chi 張持					General	Cao Wei		
Zhang Chi 張赤					Rebel leader			
Zhang Chong 張崇				Shu (Chengdu, Sichuan)	Politician	Jin dynasty	Shu Han	
Zhang Chu 張俶			277		General, politician	Eastern Wu		
Zhang Chun 張純		152	188	Yuyang (Miyun County, Beijing)	General, rebel leader	Miscellaneous	Han dynasty	
Zhang Chun 張純	Yuanji 元基			Wu County, Wu (Suzhou, Jiangsu)	Politician	Eastern Wu		
Zhang Chunhua 張春華		189	247	Pinggao, Henei (Wen County, Henan)				
Zhang Cun 張存	Churen 處仁			Nanyang (Nanyang, Henan)	Politician	Liu Bei		
Zhang Da 張達					General	Sun Quan	Shu Han	
Zhang Da 張達					Politician	Cao Wei		
Zhang Dang 張當					General	Cao Wei		
Zhang Dao 張導	Jingming 景明			Xiuwu (Xiuwu County, Henan)	Politician	Yuan Shao	Han dynasty	
Zhang Deng 張登				Zhaoguo (Handan, Hebei)	Politician	Cao Wei		
Zhang Dun 張惇					Politician	Eastern Wu		
Zhang Dun 張敦	Shufang 叔方			Wu County (Suzhou, Jiangsu)	General, politician	Eastern Wu		
Zhang Duo 張多					Warlord			
Zhang Fan 張範	Gongyi 公儀			Xiuwu, Henei (Xinxiang, Huojia County, Henan)	Advisor, politician	Cao Wei		Sanguozhi vol. 11.
Zhang Fan 張璠					Historian, writer	Jin dynasty	Cao Wei	
Zhang Fan 張汎				Mayi County, Yanmen (Shuocheng District, Shuozhou, Shanxi)	Politician	Cao Wei		
Zhang Fang 張方				Zhending, Changshan (Baoding, Hebei)	General	Cao Wei		
Zhang Fei 張飛	Yide 益德		221	Zhuo (Zhuozhou, Hebei)	General	Shu Han		Sanguozhi vol. 36.
Zhang Fen 張奮				Pengcheng (Xuzhou, Jiangsu)	General	Eastern Wu		
Zhang Fen 張奮				Henan (Luoyang, Henan)	General	Cao Cao	Han dynasty	
Zhang Feng 張奉					Politician	Shu Han		
Zhang Feng 張奉					Politician	Han dynasty		
Zhang Feng 張奉						Cao Wei		
Zhang Fu 張富				Feng, Peiguo (Feng County, Jiangsu)	Politician	Cao Wei	Zhang Lu	
Zhang Gang 張剛					General	Eastern Wu		
Zhang Ge 張閣	Zitai 子台			Dong County (Puyang, Henan)	Politician	Cao Wei		
Zhang Gong 張恭			189		Eunuch	Han dynasty		
Zhang Gong 張恭				Dunhuang County (Dunhuang, Gansu)	General	Cao Wei		
Zhang Gu 張固					General	Cao Wei		
Zhang Han 張翰					General	Jin dynasty		
Zhang Hao 張顥				Changshan'guo (Yuanshi County, Hebei)	Politician	Han dynasty		
Zhang He 張郃	Junyi 儁乂		231	Mo County, Hejian (North of Renqiu, Hebei)	General	Cao Wei	Han Fu, Yuan Shao	Sanguozhi vol. 17.
Zhang Heng 張橫					General	Han Sui	Ma Teng	
Zhang Heng 張衡				Feng County, Pei (Feng County, Jiangsu)	Religious leader	Han dynasty		
Zhang Hong 張紘	Zigang 子綱	153	212	Guangling (Yangzhou, Jiangsu)	Advisor, politician	Sun Quan	Sun Ce, Cao Cao	Sanguozhi vol. 53.
Zhang Hong 張弘					General	Lü Bu	Han dynasty	
Zhang Hong 張弘			272		General	Jin dynasty		
Zhang Hu 張虎				Mayi County, Yanmen (Shuocheng District, Shuozhou, Shanxi)	General	Cao Wei		
Zhang Hu 張虎				Jiangxia (Anlu, Hubei)	General, rebel leader	Liu Biao		
Zhang Hua 張華	Maoxian 茂先	232	300	Fangcheng, Fanyang (Gu'an County, Hebei)	Poet, politician, scholar	Jin dynasty	Cao Wei	Jin Shu vol. 36.
Zhang Hua 張華				Dunhuang County (Dunhuang, Gansu)	General	Cao Wei		
Zhang Huan 張奐	Ranming 然明	104	181	Dunhuang County (Dunhuang, Gansu)	Politician	Han dynasty		Houhanshu vol. 65.
Zhang Huxiong 張護雄				Nanchong, Ba (Nanchong, Sichuan)	Politician	Shu Han		
Zhang Ji 張緝	Jingzhong 敬仲		254	Gaoling, Pingyi	Politician	Cao Wei		Sanguozhi vol. 15. Zhang Qi in novel.
Zhang Ji 張既	Derong 德容		223	Gaoling, Pingyi	General, politician	Cao Wei		Sanguozhi vol. 15.
Zhang Ji 張濟			196	Zuli, Wuwei (Southwest of Jingyuan County, Gansu)	General, warlord	Zhang Ji	Dong Zhuo, Li Jue	
Zhang Ji 張機	Zhongjing 仲景	150	219	Nieyang, Nanyang (Zhenping, Henan)	Physician			
Zhang Ji 張吉				Anpingguo (Hengshui, Hebei)	Politician	Han dynasty		
Zhang Jia 張嘉				Nan County, Xiangyang (Xiangyang, Hubei)	Politician	Han dynasty		
Zhang Jian 張臶	Ziming 子明	136	240	Julu (Pingxiang, Hebei)	Scholar			
Zhang Jian 張儉					General	Sun Quan	Cao Wei	
Zhang Jian 張儉	Yuanjie 元節			Shanyang County (Weishan County, Shandong)	Politician	Han dynasty		Houhanshu vol. 67.
Zhang Jian 張戩				Xiuwu, Henei (Xinxiang, Huojia County, Henan)		Cao Wei		
Zhang Jie 張節				Yuzhang County (Nanchang, Jiangxi)	Rebel leader	Cao Wei		
Zhang Jin 張進			220	Zhangye, Gansu	General	Cao Wei		
Zhang Jin 張津	Ziyun 子雲			Nanyang (Nanyang, Henan)	Politician	Han dynasty		
Zhang Jin 張津					Politician	Yuan Shao		
Zhang Jing 張京					Politician	Cao Wei		
Zhang Jing 張京					General	Han dynasty		
Zhang Jing 張景					Politician	Cao Wei		
Zhang Jing 張靖				Guangling (Yangzhou, Jiangsu)		Eastern Wu		
Zhang Jingming 張景明					General	Han dynasty		
Zhang Jiong 張烱				Henai (Wuzhi County, Henan)	Politician	Yuan Shu		
Zhang Jiu 張就				Dunhuang (Dunhuang, Gansu)	Politician	Cao Wei		
Zhang Ju 張舉		150	188	Yuyang (Miyun County, Beijing)	Rebel leader	Miscellaneous	Han dynasty	
Zhang Jue / Zhang Jiao 張角			184	Julu (Pingxiang County, Hebei)	Rebel leader, general	Yellow Turban rebels		Houhanshu vol. 08, 71.
Zhang Jun 張鈞			184	Zhongshanguo (Baoding, Hebei)	Politician	Han dynasty		
Zhang Jun 張峻					Politician	Shu Han		
Zhang Jun 張君				Shu County, Chengdu (Chengdu, Sichuan)	Politician	Shu Han		
Zhang Jun 張俊			270		Politician	Eastern Wu		
Zhang Kai 張闓					General	Tao Qian	Yellow Turban rebels	
Zhang Kui 張夔					Politician	Jin dynasty	Eastern Wu	
Zhang Leigong 張雷公					Rebel leader	Zhang Yan		
Zhang Li 張禮				Yingchuan (Yuzhou, Henan)	Politician	Han dynasty		
Zhang Liang 張梁			184	Julu (Pingxiang County, Hebei)	Rebel leader	Yellow Turban rebels		Houhanshu vol. 08, 71.
Zhang Liang 張梁				Henanyin (Luoyang, Henan)	General	Eastern Wu		
Zhang Liao 張遼	Wenyuan 文遠	169	222	Mayi County, Yanmen (Shuocheng District, Shuozhou, Shanxi)	General	Cao Wei	Ding Yuan, Dong Zhuo, Lü Bu	Sanguozhi vol. 17.
Zhang Ling 張陵				Xiuwu, Henei (Xinxiang, Huojia County, Henan)		Cao Wei		
Zhang Long 張龍/張寵					General	Guo Si	Dong Zhuo, Li Jue	
Zhang Lu 張魯	Gongqi 公祺	163	216	Feng County, Pei (Feng County, Jiangsu)	Politician, religious leader, warlord	Cao Cao	Han dynasty, Zhang Lu	Sanguozhi vol. 8.
Zhang Mancheng 張曼成			184		General	Yellow Turban rebels		
Zhang Mao 張茂	Yanlin 彦林			Peiguo (Su County, Anhui)	Advisor	Cao Wei		
Zhang Meng 張猛	Shuwei 叔威			Dunhuang County (Dunhuang, Gansu)	General	Han dynasty		
Zhang Mi 張彌			233		General	Eastern Wu		
Zhang Miao 張邈	Mengzhuo 孟卓		195	Shouzhang County, Dongping (Yanggu County, Shandong)	Politician	Lü Bu	Han dynasty, Zhang Miao, Cao Cao	Sanguozhi vol. 7.
Zhang Miao 張邈				Gaoling, Fengyi (Gaoling County, Shaanxi)	Politician	Cao Wei		
Zhang Miao 張邈	Shuliao 叔遼				Politician	Jin dynasty		
Zhang Min 張旻					Politician	Shi Xie		
Zhang Mu 張慕			227		General	Shu Han		
Zhang Mu 張睦					Politician	Han dynasty		
Zhang Mu 張毣				Chengdu, Shu (Chengdu, Sichuan)	General	Shu Han		
Zhang Nan 張南	Wenjin 文進		222	Hailing, Guangling (Rugao, Jiangsu)	General	Shu Han		
Zhang Nan 張南					General	Cao Cao	Yuan Shao	
Zhang Ni / Zhang Yi 張嶷	Boqi 伯岐		254	Nanchong, Ba (Nanchong, Sichuan)	General	Shu Han		Sanguozhi vol. 43.
Zhang Niujiao 張牛角				Boling County (Baoding, Li County, Hebei)	Bandit leader	Black Mountain bandits		
Zhang Pi 張貔	Shaohu 邵虎			Julu (Pingxiang County, Hebei)	Politician	Jin dynasty		
Zhang Ping 張平				Fangcheng, Fanyang (Gu'an County, Hebei)	Politician	Cao Wei		
Zhang Qi 張岐				Qingheguo, Ganling (Linqing, Shandong)	Politician	Han dynasty		
Zhang Qiao 張喬					General	Jin dynasty		
Zhang Quan 張泉			219	Zuli, Wuwei (Southwest of Jingyuan County, Gansu)	Politician	Cao Cao		
Zhang Quan 張權					Politician	Han dynasty		
Zhang Qun 張群					General, politician	Eastern Wu		
Zhang Rang 張讓		135	189		Eunuch	Han dynasty		Houhanshu vol. 78.
Zhang Ren 張任			213		General	Liu Zhang		
Zhang Rong 張融				Zhending, Changshan (Baoding, Hebei)	Politician	Cao Wei		
Zhang Shang 張尚				Guangling (Yangzhou, Jiangsu)	Politician	Eastern Wu		
Zhang Shao 張紹				Zhuo (Zhuozhou, Hebei)	Politician	Shu Han		
Zhang Shi 張時				Hedong (Xia County, Shanxi)	Politician	Han dynasty		
Zhang Shi 張世					Servant	Eastern Wu		
Zhang Shi 張式					Politician	Cao Wei		
Zhang Shiping 張世平				Zhongshanguo (Dingzhou, Hebei)	Merchant			
Zhang Shu 張屬					General	Cao Wei		
Zhang Shuang 張爽					Politician	Shu Han		
Zhang Shun 張順					General	Cao Cao		
Zhang Shuo 張碩					General	Liu Biao		
Zhang Song 張松	Ziqiao 子喬		213	Shu (Chengdu, Sichuan)	Advisor, politician	Liu Zhang		
Zhang Song 張松					Politician	Cao Wei		
Zhang Su 張肅	Junjiao 君矯			Shu (Chengdu, Sichuan)	Politician	Liu Zhang		
Zhang Tai 張泰	Boyang 伯陽			Julu (Pingxiang County, Hebei)	Politician	Cao Wei		
Zhang Tai 張泰				Henanyin (Luoyang, Henan)	Musician	Cao Wei		
Zhang Te 張特	Zichan 子產			Zhuo (Zhuo County, Hebei)	General	Cao Wei		
Zhang Ti 張悌	Juxian 巨先	236	280	Xiangyang (Xiangyang, Hubei)	Politician	Eastern Wu		
Zhang Tong 張統				Mayi County, Yanmen (Shuocheng District, Shuozhou, Shanxi)		Cao Wei		
Zhang Tong 張通				Runan (Pingyu County, Henan)	Politician	Cao Wei	Shu Han	
Zhang Wang 張汪				Pinggao, Henei (Wen County, Henan)	Politician	Cao Cao		
Zhang Wei 張衛		172	215	Feng County, Pei (Feng County, Jiangsu)	General	Zhang Lu		Zhang Gu in RTK 11.
Zhang Wei 張微	Jianxing 建興			Wuyang, Qianwei (Pengshan County, Sichuan)	Politician	Jin dynasty	Shu Han	Huayang Guo Zhi vol. 11. 13.
Zhang Wei 張尉					General	Shu Han		
Zhang Wen 張溫	Boshen 伯慎		191		Politician	Han dynasty		
Zhang Wen 張溫	Huishu 惠恕	193	230	Wu County, Wu (Suzhou, Jiangsu)	Advisor, politician	Eastern Wu		Sanguozhi vol. 57.
Zhang Wenggui 張翁歸				Gaoling, Pingyi (Gaoling County, Shaanxi)	Politician	Cao Wei		
Zhang Wu 張吳					General	Eastern Wu		
Zhang Xi 張喜					Politician	Han dynasty		
Zhang Xi 張喜					General	Cao Cao		
Zhang Xian 張羡			200	Nanyang (Nanyang, Henan)	Politician, warlord	Zhang Xian	Liu Biao	Father of Zhang Yi.
Zhang Xian 張咸					Politician	Eastern Wu		
Zhang Xiang 張翔	Yuanfeng 元鳳			Julu (Xingtai, Hebei)		Han dynasty		
Zhang Xiang 張象					General	Jin dynasty	Eastern Wu	
Zhang Xiao 張斅	Zuwen 祖文			Dunhuang (Dunhuang, Gansu)	General	Jin dynasty		
Zhang Xiong 張雄				Mo County, Hejian (North of Renqiu, Hebei)	General	Cao Wei		
Zhang Xiu 張休	Shusi 叔嗣			Pengcheng (Xuzhou, Jiangsu)	General, politician	Eastern Wu		Sanguozhi vol. 52.
Zhang Xiu 張休			228	Shu County, Hanjia (Mingshan County, Sichuan)	General	Shu Han		
Zhang Xiu 張休					General	Cao Wei		
Zhang Xiu 張繡			207	Zuli, Wuwei (Southwest of Jingyuan County, Gansu)	General, warlord	Cao Cao	Zhang Ji, Zhang Xiu	Sanguozhi vol. 8.
Zhang Xiu 張脩					General	Cao Wei		
Zhang Xiu 張脩					General	Han dynasty		
Zhang Xuan 張玄				Guangling (Yangzhou, Jiangsu)	Politician	Eastern Wu		
Zhang Xuan 張玄	Chuxu 處虛			Chengdu (Chengdu, Sichuan)	Advisor	Han dynasty		Houhanshu vol. 36.
Zhang Xuan 張宣					General	Han dynasty		
Zhang Xun 張勛					General	Yuan Shu		
Zhang Xun 張恂					General	Eastern Wu		
Zhang Ya 張雅					Rebel leader		Han dynasty	
Zhang Yan 張燕				Zhending, Changshan (Baoding, Hebei)	Bandit leader, general	Cao Cao	Black Mountain bandits, Han dynasty	Sanguozhi vol. 8.
Zhang Yan 張延	Gongwei 公威		186	Xiuwu, Henei (Xinxiang, Huojia County, Henan)	Politician	Han dynasty		
Zhang Yan 張儼	Zijie 子節		266	Wu County, Wu (Suzhou, Jiangsu)	Scholar, politician	Eastern Wu		
Zhang Yan 張琰		173	206	Hongnong (Lingbao City, Henan)	Politician	Gao Gan		
Zhang Yan 張晏	Zibo 子博			Zhongshan (Chunhua County, Shaanxi)	Scholar	Cao Wei		
Zhang Yang 張楊	Zhishu 稚叔		198	Yunzhong (Southwest of Yuanping, Shanxi)	Politician, warlord	Zhang Yang	Han dynasty	Sanguozhi vol. 8.
Zhang Yi 張翼	Bogong 伯恭		264	Wuyang, Qianwei (Pengshan County, Sichuan)	General	Shu Han		Sanguozhi vol. 45.
Zhang Yi 張裔	Junsi 君嗣	166	230	Chengdu, Shu (Chengdu, Sichuan)	Advisor, politician	Shu Han	Liu Zhang	Sanguozhi vol. 41.
Zhang Yi 張揖	Zhirang 稚讓				Writer	Cao Wei		
Zhang Yi 張壹/箷			188		Politician	Han dynasty		
Zhang Yi 張逸			193		Politician	Han dynasty		
Zhang Yi 張懌				Nanyang (Nanyang, Henan)	Politician, warlord	Zhang Yi	Liu Biao, Zhang Xian	Son of Zhang Xian.
Zhang Yi 張顗					General	Cao Cao	Yuan Shao, Yuan Shang	
Zhang Yi 張異					General	Sun Quan		
Zhang Yi 張怡						Eastern Wu		
Zhang Yi 張奕					General	Eastern Wu		
Zhang Yin 張隱				Shanyang County (Jining, Shandong)		Han dynasty		
Zhang Ying 張英					General	Liu Yao		
Zhang Ying 張瑛				Nanchong, Ba (Nanchong, Sichuan)	Politician	Shu Han		
Zhang Ying 張潁		bk		General	Cao Wei			
Zhang Ying 張嬰					General	Cao Wei	Sun Quan	
Zhang Yong 張詠					Politician	Eastern Wu		
Zhang Yu 張裕	Nanhe 南和			Chengdu, Shu (Chengdu, Sichuan)	General	Liu Bei		Sanguozhi vol. 42.
Zhang Yu 張郁				Chengdu, Shu County (Chengdu, Sichuan)	Politician	Shu Han		
Zhang Yue 張約					Politician	Eastern Wu		
Zhang Yun 張允				Nanyang (Nanyang, Henan)	General	Cao Cao	Liu Biao	
Zhang Yun 張允				Wu County (Suzhou, Jiangsu)	Politician	Eastern Wu		
Zhang Zan 張瓚			193		Politician	Han dynasty		
Zhang Ze 張則	Yuanxiu 元修		219	Nanzheng (Nanzheng County, Shaanxi)	General, politician	Cao Cao	Han dynasty	
Zhang Zhang 張璋					General	Han dynasty		He Jin's subordinate
Zhang Zhao 張昭	Zibu 子布	156	236	Pengcheng (Xuzhou, Jiangsu)	Advisor, politician	Eastern Wu		Sanguozhi vol. 52.
Zhang Zhao 張昭				He'nai County, Xiuwu (Xinxiang, Huojia County, Henan)	Politician	Han dynasty		
Zhang Zhaoyi 張昭儀			214	Guanghan County, Po (Guanghan, Sichuan)	Noble Lady	Han Dynasty		
Zhang Zhu 張著					General	Shu Han		
Zhang Zhen 張震					General	Eastern Wu		
Zhang Zhen 張震			253	Pengcheng (Xuzhou, Jiangsu)	Politician	Eastern Wu		
Zhang Zhi 張芝	Boying 伯英		192	Hongnong (Lingbao City, Henan)	Calligrapher			
Zhang Zhi 張陟					Politician	Cao Cao		
Zhang Zhi 張祗				Wu County (Suzhou, Jiangsu)				
Zhang Zheng 張政					Politician	Cao Wei		
Zhang Zhong 張仲				Yingchuan (Yuzhou City, Henan)	Politician	Han dynasty		
Zhang Zi 張咨	Ziyi 子議		190	Yingchuan (Yuzhou City, Henan)	Politician	Han dynasty		
Zhang Zibing 張子并					Calligrapher			
Zhang Ziqian 張子謙					General	Cao Wei	Yuan Shao	
Zhang Zun 張遵			263	Zhuo (Zhuozhou, Hebei)	General, politician	Shu Han		
Zhao Ai'er 趙愛兒				Yuyang County(Mi Yun, Beijing)	Fangshi, Taoist			
Zhao Ang 趙昂	Weizhang 偉璋		219	Tianshui (Northwest of Tianshui, Gansu)	Politician	Cao Cao		
Zhao Bing 趙炳	Gong'a 公阿			Dongyang (Pingyuan County, Shandong)	Fangshi			
Zhao Chong 趙寵					General	Han dynasty		
Zhao Da 趙達				Kaifeng, Henan	Diviner, politician	Eastern Wu		Sanguozhi vol. 63.
Zhao Da 趙達					Politician	Cao Cao		
Zhao Du 趙犢			205		Rebel leader			
Zhao Dun 趙敦				Yingchuan County (Yuzhou, Henan)	Politician	Shu Han		
Zhao E 趙娥				Dangqu County (Qu County, Dazhou)	Noblewoman			Huayang Guo Zhi vol. 10
Zhao Fan 趙範					Politician, warlord	Zhao Fan	Han dynasty	
Zhao Feng 趙酆					General, politician	Jin dynasty	Cao Wei	
Zhao Fu 趙浮					General	Han Fu		
Zhao Guang 趙廣			263	Zhending, Changshan (South of Zhengding, Hebei)	General	Shu Han		
Zhao Hong 趙弘			184		General	Yellow Turban rebels		
Zhao Ji 趙基					Politician	Cao Wei		
Zhao Ji 趙楫						Cao Wei		
Zhao Jian 趙戩	Shumao 叔茂			Changling, Jingzhaoyin (Jingyang County, Shaanxi)	Politician	Cao Wei	Han dynasty, Liu Biao	
Zhao Kongyao 趙孔曜								
Zhao Lei 趙累			220		General	Liu Bei		
Zhao Mo 趙謨					General	Han dynasty		
Zhao Ning 趙甯				Chengdu (Chengdu, Sichuan)	Politician, Scholar	Han dynasty		
Zhao Qi 趙岐	Taiqing 台卿	108	201	Changling, Jingzhao (Xianyang, Shaanxi)	Politician	Han dynasty		Houhanshu vol. 64.
Zhao Qian 趙謙	Yanxin 彥信		192	Chengdu (Chengdu, Sichuan)	General	Han dynasty		
Zhao Qin 趙欽					Politician	Eastern Wu		
Zhao Qinglong 趙青龍					Rebel leader			
Zhao Qu 趙衢					General	Cao Wei		
Zhao Quan 趙泉					Physician	Eastern Wu		
Zhao Rong 趙融					General	Han dynasty		
Zhao Rong 趙融					General	Shu Han		
Zhao Rong 趙融	Zhichang 稚長				General	Han dynasty		
Zhao Rui 趙叡			200		General	Yuan Shao		
Zhao Shu 趙庶					General	Cao Cao	Lü Bu	
Zhao Ting 趙亭				Yangzhai, Yingchuan (Yuzhou City, Henan)		Cao Wei		
Zhao Tong 趙統				Zhending, Changshan (South of Zhengding, Hebei)	General	Shu Han		
Zhao Wei 趙韙					Politician	Liu Yan	Han dynasty	
Zhao Weisun 趙威孫				Wen, Henai (Wen County, Henan)	General	Han dynasty		
Zhao Weizhang 趙偉璋				Hanyang County (Tianshui, Gansu)	Politician	Han dynasty		
Zhao Wen 趙溫	Zirou 子柔	137	208	Chengdu, Shu (Chengdu, Sichuan)	Politician	Han dynasty		
Zhao Xi 趙襲	Yuansi 元嗣			Chang'an (Xi'an, Shaanxi)	Calligrapher, politician	Han dynasty		
Zhao Yan 趙儼	Boran 伯然	171	245	Yangzhai, Yingchuan (Yuzhou City, Henan)	Politician	Cao Wei		Sanguozhi vol. 23.
Zhao Yan 趙彥				Langya (Linyi, Shandong)	Politician	Han dynasty		Houhanshu vol. 82.
Zhao Yi 趙壹	Yuanshu 元叔	122	196	Xi County, Hanyang (Tianshui, Gansu)	Poet, politician	Han dynasty		Houhanshu vol. 80. (Part.2)
Zhao Ying 趙英				Tianshui (Northwest of Tianshui, Gansu)		Cao Cao		
Zhao Yong 趙顒					Politician	Cao Cao		
Zhao Yu 趙嫗		226	248	Jun'an, Jiuzhen (Trieu Son, Thanh Hoa)	Tribal leader, rebel leader	Nanyue		
Zhao Yu 趙昱	Yuanda 元達				Politician	Tao Qian	Han dynasty	
Zhao Yuanjiang 趙媛姜			200	Qianwei (Qianwei, Sichuan)				Houhanshu vol. 84.
Zhao Yue 趙月				Tianshui (Northwest of Tianshui, Gansu)	General	Cao Cao	Han dynasty	
Zhao Yun 趙雲	Zilong 子龍		229	Zhending, Changshan (South of Zhengding, Hebei)	General	Shu Han	Gongsun Zan	Sanguozhi vol. 36.
Zhao Zheng 趙正					General	Shu Han		
Zhao Zhi 趙直					Fortune teller, politician	Shu Han		
Zhao Zhi 趙祗					Rebel leader	Yellow Turban rebels		
Zhao Zhong 趙忠			189		Eunuch	Han dynasty		
Zhao Zhuo 趙濯					Politician	Eastern Wu	Han dynasty	
Zhao Zi 趙咨	Junchu 君初			Henai County, Wen (Wen County, Henan)	Politician	Cao Cao		
Zhao Zi 趙咨	Dedu 德度			Nanyang County (Nanyang, Henan)	Politician	Eastern Wu		
Zhao Zong 趙宗						Cao Wei		
Zhao Zuo 趙莋					Politician	Shu Han		
Empress Zhen 甄皇后			251	Wuji, Zhongshan (Wuji County, Hebei)	Empress	Cao Wei		
Lady Zhen 甄氏		183	221	Wuji, Zhongshan (Wuji County, Hebei)	Noble lady	Cao Wei		Sanguozhi vol. 5.
Zhen Chang 甄暢					Politician	Cao Wei		
Zhen Dao 甄道				Wuji, Zhongshan (Wuji County, Hebei)				
Zhen Huang 甄黃								
Zhen Jiang 甄姜				Wuji, Zhongshan (Wuji County, Hebei)				
Zhen Rong 甄榮				Wuji, Zhongshan (Wuji County, Hebei)				
Zhen Shao 甄紹					Politician	Cao Wei		
Zhen Tuo 甄脱				Wuji, Zhongshan (Wuji County, Hebei)				
Zhen Wen 甄溫	Zhongshu 仲舒				General, politician	Jin dynasty	Cao Wei	
Zhen Xiang 甄像			229		General	Cao Wei		
Zhen Yan 甄儼				Wuji, Zhongshan (Wuji County, Hebei)	General	Cao Wei		
Zhen Yan 甄艷					Politician	Cao Wei		
Zhen Yao 甄堯				Wuji, Zhongshan (Wuji County, Hebei)		Han dynasty		
Zhen Yi 甄逸				Wuji, Zhongshan (Wuji County, Hebei)	Politician	Cao Wei	Han dynasty	
Zhen Yi 甄毅					General	Shu Han		
Zhen Yu 甄豫				Wuji, Zhongshan (Wuji County, Hebei)				
Zhen Ziran 甄子然				Beihaiguo (Changle County, Shandong)				
Zheng Ang 正昂					Politician	Shu Han		
Zheng Bao 鄭寶			198		Warlord			
Zheng Chang 鄭長				Runan (Pingyu County, Henan)				
Zheng Cheng 鄭稱					Politician	Cao Wei		
Zheng Chong 鄭沖	Wenhe 文和		273	Kaifeng, Sizhou (Kaifeng, Henan)	Politician, scholar	Jin dynasty	Cao Wei	Jin Shu vol. 33.
Zheng Chong 鄭崇				Kaifeng (Kaifeng, Henan)	Politician	Cao Wei		
Zheng Chuo 鄭綽					General	Shu Han		
Zheng Du 鄭度				Guanghan	Advisor	Liu Zhang		
Zheng Feng 鄭豐	Manji 曼季			Peiguo (Pei County, Jiangsu)				
Zheng Gan 鄭甘			221	Fengyi (Dali County, Shaanxi)	Rebel leader, politician		Cao Wei	
Zheng Hun 鄭渾	Wengong 文公			Kaifeng, Henan	Politician	Cao Wei		Sanguozhi vol. 16.
Zheng Kai 鄭凱	Zhaogong 召公			Yingchuan (Yuzhou, Henan)	Politician	Han dynasty		
Zheng Li 鄭禮					Politician	Eastern Wu		
Zheng Mao 鄭袤	Linshu 林叔	189	273	Kaifeng (Kaifeng, Henan)	Politician	Cao Wei		Jin Shu vol. 44.
Zheng Mo 鄭默	Sixuan 思玄	213	280	Kaifeng (Kaifeng, Henan)	Politician	Jin dynasty	Cao Wei	
Zheng Qi 鄭岐					Politician	Cao Wei		
Zheng Quan 鄭泉	Wenyuan 文淵			Chen'guo (Huaiyang County, Henan)	Politician	Eastern Wu		
Zheng Shu 鄭舒				Kaifeng (Kaifeng, Henan)	Politician	Jin dynasty		
Zheng Sui 鄭遂			192		Politician	Han dynasty		
Zheng Tai 鄭泰/太	Gongye 公業	151	192	Kaifeng, Yuzhou (Kaifeng, Henan)	Politician	Yuan Shu	Han dynasty	Houhanshu vol. 70.
Zheng Tiansheng 鄭天生					Deng Zhi's mother	Shu Han		
Zheng Da 鄭達	Wenxin 文信				Politician	Han dynasty		
Zheng Xi 鄭熙					Politician	Cao Wei		
Zheng Xiang 鄭像			253		General	Cao Wei		
Zheng Xiaotong 鄭小同					Politician	Cao Wei		
Zheng Xu 鄭詡				Kaifeng (Kaifeng, Henan)	Politician	Jin dynasty		
Zheng Xuan 鄭玄	Kangcheng 康成	127	200	Gaomi, Beihai, Qingzhou (Gaomi, Shandong)	Politician, scholar	Yuan Shao	Han dynasty	Houhanshu vol. 35.
Zheng Yi 鄭翼				Anfeng, Lujiang (Gushi County, Henan)	General	Cao Wei		
Zheng Yu 鄭嫗					Fortune teller			
Zheng Yu 鄭豫				Kaifeng (Kaifeng, Henan)	Politician	Jin dynasty		
Zheng Zha 鄭札				Peiguo (Pei County, Jiangsu)	Politician	Eastern Wu		
Zheng Zhi 鄭質				Kaifeng (Kaifeng, Henan)	Politician	Jin dynasty		
Zheng Zhou 鄭胄	Jingxian 敬先			Peiguo (Pei County, Jiangsu)	General	Eastern Wu		
Zhi Chong 徵崇	Zihe 子和			Henanyin (Luoyang, Henan)	Scholar, politician	Eastern Wu		
Zhi Wudai 治無戴					Tribal leader	Shu Han	Cao Wei	
Zhi Xi 脂習	Yuansheng 元升			Jingzhaoyin (Xi'an, Shaanxi)	Politician	Cao Wei	Han dynasty	
Zhiyuanduo 治元多					Tribal leader	Lushuihu		
Zhong Chan 鍾辿				Changshe, Yingchuan (Changge, Henan)		Cao Wei		
Zhong Chang 仲長					Huan Fan's wife	Cao Wei		
Zhong Fu 種拂	Yingbo 穎伯			Luoyang (Luoyang, Henan)	Politician	Han dynasty		
Zhong Fu 鍾敷				Changshe, Yingchuan (Changge, Henan)				
Zhong Hao 鍾皓	Jiming 季明	121	189	Changshe, Yingchuan (Changge, Henan)	Scholar	Han dynasty		Houhanshu vol. 62.
Zhong Hui 鍾會	Shiji 士季	225	264	Changshe, Yingchuan (Changge, Henan)	General, politician	Cao Wei		Sanguozhi vol. 28.
Zhong Ji 種輯			200		General	Han dynasty		Chong Ji in novel.
Zhong Jun 鍾峻				Changshe, Yingchuan (Changge, Henan)		Cao Wei		
Zhong Jun 鍾駿				Changshe, Yingchuan (Changge, Henan)	Politician	Cao Wei		
Zhong Shao 鍾劭				Changshe, Yingchuan (Changge, Henan)	Politician	Cao Wei		
Zhong Shao 種邵	Shenfu 申甫			Luoyang (Luoyang, Henan)	Politician	Han dynasty		
Zhong Yao 鍾繇	Yuanchang 元常	151	230	Changshe, Yingchuan (Changge, Henan)	Calligrapher, politician	Cao Wei	Han dynasty	Sanguozhi vol. 13.
Zhong Yi 鍾毅			264	Changshe, Yingchuan (Changge, Henan)		Cao Wei		
Zhong Yong 鍾邕			264	Changshe, Yingchuan (Changge, Henan)	General	Cao Wei		
Zhong Yu 鍾毓	Zhishu 稚叔		263	Changshe, Yingchuan (Changge, Henan)	General, politician	Cao Wei		
Zhong Yu 鍾瑜				Changshe, Yingchuan (Changge, Henan)		Han dynasty		Sanguozhi vol. 13.
Zhong Yu 鍾豫				Changshe, Yingchuan (Changge, Henan)	Politician	Cao Wei		
Zhongchang Tong 仲長統	Gongli 公理	180	220	Shanyang County (Jining, Weishan County, Shandong)	Commentator, politician	Cao Cao	Han dynasty	Houhanshu vol. 49.
Zhongli Fei 鍾離斐					General	Eastern Wu		
Zhongli Mao 鍾離茂			250		General	Eastern Wu		
Zhongli Mu 鍾離牧	Zigan 子幹			Shanyin, Kuaiji (Southeast of Shaoxing, Zhejiang)	General	Eastern Wu		Sanguozhi vol. 60.
Zhongli Sheng 鍾離盛				Shanyin, Kuaiji (Southeast of Shaoxing, Zhejiang)	Politician	Eastern Wu		
Zhongli Xu 鍾離緒				Shanyin, Kuaiji (Southeast of Shaoxing, Zhejiang)	Politician	Eastern Wu		
Zhongli Xun 鍾離徇			280	Shanyin, Kuaiji (Southeast of Shaoxing, Zhejiang)	General	Eastern Wu		
Zhongli Yi 鍾離禕				Shanyin, Kuaiji (Southeast of Shaoxing, Zhejiang)	General	Eastern Wu		
Zhongli Yin 鍾離駰				Shanyin, Kuaiji (Southeast of Shaoxing, Zhejiang)	Politician	Eastern Wu		
Zhou Ang 周昂				Kuaiji (Shaoxing, Zhejiang)	General	Yuan Shao		
Zhou Bi 周毖	Zhongyuan 仲遠			Wuwei (Wuwei, Gansu)	Politician	Han dynasty		
Zhou Buyi 周不疑	Yuanzhi 元直			Jingzhou, Lingling (Lingling District, Hunan)	Advisor	Cao Cao	Liu Biao	
Zhou Chao 周朝					Rebel leader			
Zhou Cheng 周承				Xiacai, Jiujiang (Fengtai County, Anhui)	General	Eastern Wu		
Zhou Chong 周崇				Shu County, Lujiang (Shucheng County, Anhui)	Politician	Han dynasty		
Zhou Chu 周處	Ziyin 子隱	240	299	Yangxian, Wu (Yixing, Jiangsu)	General	Jin dynasty	Eastern Wu	Jin Shu vol. 58.
Zhou Fang 周魴	Ziyu 子魚			Yangxian, Wu (Yixing, Jiangsu)	General	Eastern Wu		Sanguozhi vol. 60.
Zhou Feng 周鳳					Rebel leader			
Zhou Fu 周馥	Zuxuan 祖宣			Runan County (Runan County, Henan)	General, politician	Jin dynasty		
Zhou Gu 周谷					Politician	Sun Quan		
Zhou Guang 周光				Wei County (Linzhang County, Hebei)	Politician	Cao Wei		
Zhou He 周賀			232		General	Eastern Wu		
Zhou Hong 周洪					Politician	Han dynasty		
Zhou Hu 周護				Shu County, Lujiang (Shucheng County, Anhui)		Eastern Wu		
Zhou Huan 周奐	Wenming 文明		192		Politician	Han dynasty		
Zhou Hui 周暉				Shu County, Lujiang (Shucheng County, Anhui)	Politician	Han dynasty		
Zhou Jing 周旌				Peiguo (Su County, Anhui)		Han dynasty		
Zhou Jing 周京						Eastern Wu		
Zhou Ju 周巨				Langzhong, Baxi (Langzhong, Sichuan)	Astrologer	Shu Han		
Zhou Jun 周浚	Kailin 開林			Runan County (Runan County, Henan)	General, politician	Jin dynasty	Cao Wei	Jin Shu vol. 31.
Zhou Jun 周峻				Shu County, Lujiang (Shucheng County, Anhui)	General	Eastern Wu		
Zhou Kui 周逵				Xiapiguo (Suining County, Jiangsu)	Politician	Cao Cao		
Zhou Pei 周裴				Runan County (Runan County, Henan)	Zhou Jun (Cao Wei)'s father	Cao Wei		
Zhou Qun 周群	Zhongzhi 仲直			Langzhong, Baxi (Langzhong, Sichuan)	Astronomer, politician	Liu Bei	Liu Zhang	Sanguozhi vol. 42.
Zhou Shang 周尚				Shu County, Lujiang (Shucheng County, Anhui)	Politician	Sun Quan		
Zhou Shao 周邵			230	Xiacai, Jiujiang (Fengtai County, Anhui)	General	Eastern Wu		
Zhou Shen 周慎					General	Han dynasty		
Zhou Sheng 周生				Yingchuan County (Xuchang, Henan)		Han dynasty		
Zhou Shu 周術					General	Han dynasty		
Zhou Shu 周舒	Shubu 叔布			Ba County, Langzhong (Langzhong, Sichuan)	Scholar			
Zhou Tai 周泰	Youping 幼平			Xiacai, Jiujiang (Fengtai County, Anhui)	General	Eastern Wu		Sanguozhi vol. 55.
Zhou Tai 州泰			261	Nanyang (Nanyang, Henan)	General	Cao Wei		
Zhou Tiao 周條					Scholar	Eastern Wu		
Zhou Xin 周昕	Daming 大明		196	Kuaiji (Shaoxing, Zhejiang)	General	Wang Lang	Han dynasty, Yuan Shao	
Zhou Xuan 周宣	Konghe 孔和			Le'an (Boxing County, Shandong)	Diviner, politician	Cao Wei		Sanguozhi vol. 29.
Zhou Xun 周循				Shu County, Lujiang (Shucheng County, Anhui)	General	Eastern Wu		
Zhou Yi 周奕					Politician	Eastern Wu		
Zhou Yi 周遺						Eastern Wu		
Zhou Yi 周異				Shu County, Lujiang (Shucheng County, Anhui)	Politician	Han dynasty		
Zhou Yin 周胤			239	Shu County, Lujiang (Shucheng County, Anhui)	General	Eastern Wu		
Zhou Yu 周瑜	Gongjin 公瑾	175	210	Shu County, Lujiang (Shucheng County, Anhui)	General, advisor	Sun Quan	Yuan Shu, Sun Ce	Sanguozhi vol. 54.
Zhou Yu 周喁	Renming 仁明			Kuaiji (Shaoxing, Zhejiang)	General	Yuan Shao	Han dynasty, Cao Cao	
Zhou Zhao 周昭	Gongyuan 恭遠			Yingchuan County (Yuzhou, Henan)	Politician, writer	Eastern Wu		
Zhou Zhi 周旨					General	Jin dynasty		
Zhou Zhi 周祗			237			Eastern Wu		
Zhou Zhi 周直						Han dynasty		
Zhou Zhong 周忠	Jiamou 嘉谋			Shu County, Lujiang (Shucheng County, Anhui)	Politician	Han dynasty		
Zhousheng Lie 周生烈				Dunhuang County (Dunhuang, Gansu)	Writer	Cao Wei		
Empress Zhu 朱皇后			265	Wu County, Wu (Suzhou, Jiangsu)	Empress	Eastern Wu		Sanguozhi vol. 50.
Zhu Ao 祝奥					Advisor	Guo Yuan		
Zhu Bao 朱褒					General	Shu Han		
Zhu Bi 祝臂					Rebel leader			
Zhu Cai 朱才	Junye 君業			Guzhang, Danyang (Anji County, Zhejiang)	General	Eastern Wu		
Zhu Cheng 朱成					General	Cao Wei		
Zhu En 朱恩			253		Politician	Eastern Wu		
Zhu Fu 朱符				Kuaiji (Southeast of Shaoxing, Zhejiang)	Politician	Han dynasty		
Zhu Fu 朱撫					General	Cao Wei		
Zhu Gai 朱蓋					General	Cao Wei		
Zhu Gongdao 祝公道				Henanyin (Luoyang, Henan)				
Zhu Guang 朱光					General	Cao Wei		
Zhu Gui 祝龜	Yuanling 元靈			Nanzheng County (Nanzheng County, Shaanxi)	Politician, writer	Liu Biao		
Zhu Han 朱漢			191	Henai County (Wuzhi County, Henan)	Politician	Yuan Shao	Han dynasty	
Zhu Hao 朱皓	Wenming 文明		195	Shangyu, Kuaiji (Shangyu, Zhejiang)	General	Han dynasty		
Zhu Huan 朱桓	Xiumu 休穆	176	238	Wu County, Wu (Suzhou, Jiangsu)	General	Eastern Wu		Sanguozhi vol. 56.
Zhu Ji 朱績	Gongxu 公緒		270	Guzhang, Danyang (Anji County, Zhejiang)	General	Eastern Wu		a.k.a. Shi Ji
Zhu Ji 朱紀				Guzhang, Danyang (Anji County, Zhejiang)	General	Eastern Wu		
Zhu Jianping 朱建平				Pei (in Anhui)	Fortune teller			Sanguozhi vol. 29.
Zhu Ju 朱据	Zifan 子範	194	250	Wu County, Wu (Suzhou, Jiangsu)	General	Eastern Wu		Sanguozhi vol. 57.
Zhu Jun 朱儁	Gongwei 公偉		195	Shangyu, Kuaiji (Shangyu, Zhejiang)	General, politician	Han dynasty		Houhanshu vol. 71.
Zhu Ling 朱靈	Wenbo 文博		223	Yu County, Qinghe (Southwest of Pingyuan County, Shandong)	General	Cao Wei	Yuan Shao	
Zhu Nan 朱南					Politician	Han dynasty		
Zhu Qiao 朱喬					General	Eastern Wu		
Zhu Ran 朱然	Yifeng 義封	182	249	Guzhang, Danyang (Anji County, Zhejiang)	General	Eastern Wu		Sanguozhi vol. 56.
Zhu Shuo 朱鑠	Yancai 彥才	174	253		Politician	Cao Wei		
Zhu Sun 朱損				Wu County, Wu (Suzhou, Jiangsu)	General	Eastern Wu		
Zhu Tian 祝恬					Politician	Han dynasty		
Zhu Wan 朱琬				Guzhang, Danyang (Anji County, Zhejiang)	General	Eastern Wu		
Zhu Wansui 朱萬歲				Guzhang, Danyang (Anji County, Zhejiang)		Eastern Wu		
Zhu Wei 朱緯				Guzhang, Danyang (Anji County, Zhejiang)		Eastern Wu		
Zhu Xiong 朱熊				Wu County, Wu (Suzhou, Jiangsu)	General	Eastern Wu		
Zhu Xuan 朱宣				Wu County, Wu (Suzhou, Jiangsu)	General	Eastern Wu		
Zhu Yi 朱異	Jiwen 季文		257	Wu County, Wu (Suzhou, Jiangsu)	General	Eastern Wu		Sanguozhi vol. 56.
Zhu Ying 朱應					Explorer	Eastern Wu		
Zhu You 朱游				Shu County, Guangdu (Chengdu, Sichuan)	Politician	Shu Han		
Zhu Yu 朱育				Kuaiji, Shanyin (Shaoxing, Zhejiang)	Scholar, politician	Eastern Wu		
Zhu Yuan 朱淵				Gushu (He County, Anhui)	Politician	Han dynasty		
Zhu Yue 朱越				Dong County (Puyang, Henan)	General	Cao Wei		
Zhu Zan 朱讚					General	Cao Wei		
Zhu Zhen 朱貞			245		Rebel leader, politician		Eastern Wu	
Zhu Zheng 朱整			289		Politician	Jin dynasty	Cao Wei	
Zhu Zhi 朱治	Junli 君理	156	224	Guzhang, Danyang (Anji County, Zhejiang)	General	Sun Quan		Sanguozhi vol. 56.
Zhu Zhi 朱志			245		Rebel leader, general		Eastern Wu	
Zhuge Chong 諸葛冲	Maochang 茂長			Yangdu, Langya (Yinan County, Shandong)	Politician	Jin dynasty		
Zhuge Chuo 諸葛綽				Yangdu, Langya (Yinan County, Shandong)	General	Eastern Wu		
Zhuge Dan 諸葛誕	Gongxiu 公休		258	Yangdu, Langya (Yinan County, Shandong)	General	Cao Wei		Sanguozhi vol. 28.
Zhuge Gui 諸葛珪	Jungong 君貢		187	Yangdu, Langya (Yinan County, Shandong)	Politician	Han dynasty		
Zhuge Huai 諸葛懷				Yangdu, Langya (Yinan County, Shandong)		Shu Han		
Zhuge Jian 諸葛建			253	Yangdu, Langya (Yinan County, Shandong)	General	Eastern Wu		
Zhuge Jin 諸葛瑾	Ziyu 子瑜	174	241	Yangdu, Langya (Yinan County, Shandong)	General, politician	Eastern Wu		Sanguozhi vol. 52.
Zhuge Jing 諸葛京	Xingzong 行宗			Yangdu, Langya (Yinan County, Shandong)	Politician	Jin dynasty	Shu Han	
Zhuge Jing 諸葛靚	Zhongsi 仲思			Yangdu, Langya (Yinan County, Shandong)	General	Eastern Wu	Cao Wei	
Zhuge Jun 諸葛均				Yangdu, Langya (Yinan County, Shandong)	General	Shu Han		
Zhuge Ke 諸葛恪	Yuanxun 元遜	203	253	Yangdu, Langya (Yinan County, Shandong)	General, politician, regent	Eastern Wu		Sanguozhi vol. 64.
Zhuge Liang 諸葛亮	Kongming 孔明	181	234	Yangdu, Langya (Yinan County, Shandong)	Advisor, general, politician, regent	Shu Han		Sanguozhi vol. 35.
Zhuge Pan 諸葛攀				Yangdu, Langya (Yinan County, Shandong)	General	Shu Han		
Zhuge Qian 諸葛虔					General	Cao Wei		
Zhuge Qiao 諸葛喬	Bosong 伯松	197	223	Yangdu, Langya (Yinan County, Shandong)	General	Shu Han		Sanguozhi vol. 35.
Zhuge Rong 諸葛融	Shuchang 叔長		253	Yangdu, Langya (Yinan County, Shandong)	General	Eastern Wu		
Zhuge Shang 諸葛尚		245	263	Yangdu, Langya (Yinan County, Shandong)	General	Shu Han		
Zhuge Song 諸葛竦				Yangdu, Langya (Yinan County, Shandong)	General	Eastern Wu		
Zhuge Xian 諸葛顯				Yangdu, Langya (Yinan County, Shandong)		Shu Han		
Zhuge Xu 諸葛緒				Yangdu, Langya (Yinan County, Shandong)	General	Jin dynasty	Cao Wei	
Zhuge Xuan 諸葛玄			197	Yangdu, Langya (Yinan County, Shandong)	Politician	Han dynasty		
Zhuge Yi 諸葛壹					General	Eastern Wu		
Zhuge Yuan 諸葛原	Jingchun 景春				Diviner, politician	Cao Wei		
Zhuge Zhan 諸葛瞻	Siyuan 思遠	227	263	Yangdu, Langya (Yinan County, Shandong)	General	Shu Han		Sanguozhi vol. 35.
Zhuge Zhang 諸葛璋					Politician	Cao Wei		
Zhuge Zhi 諸葛直			231		General	Eastern Wu		
Zhuge Zhi 諸葛質				Yangdu, Langya (Yinan County, Shandong)	Politician	Shu Han		
Zhuo Ying 卓膺					General	Shu Han	Liu Zhang	
Zong Cheng 宗承				Nanyang County (Nanyang, Henan)	Politician	Han dynasty		
Zong Hong 鬷弘					General, politician	Cao Wei		
Zong Huishu 宗惠叔				Nanyang County (Nanyang, Henan)		Cao Wei		
Zong Wei 宗瑋					Politician	Shu Han		
Zong Xiu 宗修				Wu County (Suzhou, Jiangsu)	Politician	Eastern Wu		
Zong Yan 宗艷					Politician	Cao Wei		
Zong Yu 宗預	Deyan 德豔		264	Anzhong, Nanyang (Southeast of Zhenping County, Henan)	General, politician	Cao Wei	Shu Han	
Zong Yuan 宗員					General	Han dynasty		
Zong Ziqing 宗子卿				Nanyang County (Nanyang, Henan)	General	Han dynasty		
Lady Zou 鄒氏					Zhang Xiu's aunt			
Zou Dan 鄒丹			194		General	Gongsun Zan		
Zou Jing 鄒靖				Changsha (Xiangyin County, Hunan)	General	Han dynasty		
Zou Lin 鄒臨			203		Rebel leader			
Zou Qi 鄒岐					Politician	Cao Wei		
Zou Ta 鄒他				Wu County, Wucheng (Huzhou, Zhejiang)	Rebel leader			
Zou Zhan 鄒湛	Runfu 潤甫		299	Nanyang County, Xinye (Xinye County, Henan)	Politician, writer	Jin dynasty	Cao Wei	
Zu Lang 祖郎				Jing, Danyang (Jing County, Anhui)	General	Sun Ce		
Zu Mao 祖茂					General	Sun Jian		
Zu Shan 祖山				You, Danyang (Yi County, Anhui)	Rebel leader			
Zuo Bo 左伯	Ziyi 子邑			Donglai (Laizhou, Shandong)	Scholar, calligrapher			
Zuo Chengzu 左丞祖					Politician	Han dynasty		
Zuo Ci 左慈	Yuanfang 元放			Lujiang (Southwest of Lujiang County, Anhui)	Fangshi, Taoist			
Zuo Feng 左豐					Eunuch	Han dynasty		
Zuo Ling 左靈					General	Li Jue	Han dynasty	
Zuo Xiao 左校					Rebel leader	Zhang Yan		
Zuo Yannian 左延年					Musician	Cao Wei		
Zuo Yi 左奕					General	Eastern Wu		
Zuo Zizhangba 左髭丈八			193		Rebel leader	Zhang Yan		
Zuwanneng 且萬能					Tribal leader	Jin dynasty	Tufa Shujineng	Jin Shu vol. 57.
