= Xu Gong =

Chinese official and warlord (died 200)

- 許貢

Administrator of Wu Commandery (吳郡太守)
- In office 194 – 195
- Monarch: Emperor Xian of Han
- Preceded by: Sheng Xian
- Succeeded by: Chen Yu

Commandant of Wu Commandery (吳郡都尉)
- In office ? – 194
- Monarch: Emperor Xian of Han
- Succeeded by: Zhu Zhi

Personal details
- Born: Unknown
- Died: 200
- Occupation: Politician, warlord

Xu Gong (died 200) was a Chinese politician and minor warlord of the late Eastern Han dynasty of China.

== Life ==
Xu Gong started his career sometime between 190 and 193 as the Commandant (都尉) of Wu Commandery (around present-day Suzhou, Jiangsu). He was a close friend of Xu Jing, who fled to the Jiangdong territories in the early 190s to evade the chaos in central China. Xu Gong accepted Xu Jing and treated him like an honoured guest. At the time, Xu Gong's direct superior was Sheng Xian, the Administrator (太守) of Wu Commandery.

Around the early 190s, the warlord Yuan Shu occupied parts of Yang Province and defeated the brothers Zhou Ang, Zhou Xin and Zhou Yu (Renming), who used to control the territories there. Xu Gong killed Zhou Yu (Renming) while the latter was on his way home to Kuaiji Commandery. As Yuan Shu also killed the Inspector (刺史) of Yang Province, the Han central government appointed Liu Yao to be the new Inspector. Since Yuan Shu already seized control of Shouchun (壽春; present-day Shou County, Anhui), the administrative centre of Yang Province, Liu Yao had no choice but to set up a new administrative centre at Qu'e County (曲阿縣; around present-day Danyang, Jiangsu).

In 194, Sheng Xian resigned because he was ill, so Xu Gong replaced him as the Administrator of Wu Commandery. Xu Gong, in turn, was succeeded by Zhu Zhi as the Commandant of Wu Commandery. After assuming office, Xu Gong attempted to murder his predecessor Sheng Xian. However, Gao Dai (高岱) helped Sheng Xian by hiding him in the home of Xu Zhao (許昭), one of Xu Gong's subordinates. Xu Gong then arrested Gao Dai's mother to try to lure Gao Dai out and then kill them, but Gao Dai managed to escape with the help of his friends.

In 195, Sun Ce, a military officer under Yuan Shu, pretended to offer to help Yuan Shu conquer the territories in the Jiangdong region and was given some troops to carry out his task. After leaving Yuan Shu, Sun Ce embarked on a series of conquests in Jiangdong and became a warlord in his own right. He defeated Liu Yao and occupied Danyang Commandery (丹陽郡; around present-day Nanjing, Jiangsu), and then turned his attention towards Wu Commandery. Sun Ce defeated Xu Gong at Youquan (由拳縣; south of present-day Jiaxing, Zhejiang) and seized control of Wu Commandery. Xu Gong fled to Wucheng County (烏程縣; south of present-day Huzhou, Zhejiang) after his defeat and took shelter under Yan Baihu, a bandit chief.

Sun Ce caught up with Xu Gong and Yan Baihu and defeated them later, so they fled to Yuhang County (餘杭縣; in present-day Hangzhou, Zhejiang) to take shelter under Xu Zhao (許昭). Sun Ce respected Xu Zhao for his righteousness (when he allowed Sheng Xian to hide in his home to avoid Xu Gong's persecution) and for his kindness towards an old friend (when he provided shelter to Yan Baihu), so he did not follow-up and attack Yuhang County.

After losing control over Wu Commandery, Xu Gong felt bitter and harboured the intention of seizing it back from Sun Ce, so in 200 CE he wrote a letter to the warlord Cao Cao, who controlled the Han central government and the figurehead Emperor Xian. In the letter, Xu Gong noted that Sun Ce was very much like Xiang Yu, and he urged Cao Cao to summon Sun Ce to the imperial capital Xu (許; present-day Xuchang, Henan) in the name of the Emperor and keep him in the imperial capital lest he became a threat in the future. However, unluckily for Xu Gong, Sun Ce's men intercepted his messenger, found the letter and gave it to Sun Ce. Sun Ce then came to confront Xu Gong about the letter. When Xu Gong denied writing the letter, Sun Ce ordered his men to strangle Xu Gong to death. Some time later, within the same year, Xu Gong's former subordinates ambushed Sun Ce while he was out on a hunting trip and assassinated him.

== See also ==
- Lists of people of the Three Kingdoms
