= Pingxiang (disambiguation) =

Pingxiang (萍乡市) is a prefecture-level city of Jiangxi, People's Republic of China (PRC).

It may also refer to the following locations in the PRC:

- Pingxiang, Guangxi (凭祥市), county-level city
  - Pingxiang, Pingxiang, Guangxi (凭祥镇), town in and seat of said city
- Pingxiang County (平乡县), Hebei
  - Pingxiang, Hebei (平乡镇), town in said county
