= Zhuge Jun =

Chinese official of the Shu Han during the Three Kingdoms period

Zhuge Jun (Chinese: 諸葛均; 189 - ?) was an official of the Shu Han during the Three Kingdoms period. He was the third brother of Zhuge Jin and the Shu Han Chancellor Zhuge Liang.

== Background ==
Zhuge Jun and his brothers hailed from Langya (present-day Yinan County, Shandong Province). Zhuge Jun, due to the early death of his father Zhuge Gui, was raised alongside his brother Zhuge Liang under the care of their uncle Zhuge Xuan. When Zhuge Xuan was appointed as the Administrator of Yuzhang by Yuan Shu, he took Zhuge Jun and his brothers with him to Yuzhang. However, later, when the Han court appointed Zhu Hao to replace Zhuge Xuan, the latter left for Jingzhou to join his old friend Liu Biao. Zhuge Jun and Zhuge Liang followed him to Jingzhou. Eventually, while Zhuge Liang served in Shu Han, Zhuge Jun also attained the rank of colonel.
