= Sheng Xian =

Late 2nd century Chinese politician and official

- 盛憲

Administrator of Wu Commandery (吳郡太守)
- In office ? – 194
- Monarch: Emperor Xian of Han
- Succeeded by: Xu Gong

Personal details
- Born: Unknown
- Died: Unknown
- Occupation: Politician
- Courtesy name: Xiaozhang (孝章)

Sheng Xian (fl. 190s–200s), courtesy name Xiaozhang, was a Chinese politician of the Eastern Han dynasty of China. He was from Kuaiji Commandery (present-day Shaoxing, Zhejiang).

== Life ==
Sheng Xian served as the administrator of Wu Commandery (around present-day Suzhou, Jiangsu). He recommended Gao Dai (高岱) for government service. Around 193, when Xu Gong took over Wu Commandery by force, Gao Dai took Sheng Xian and hid him at the home of a military officer, Xu Zhao (許昭). To dissuade Xu Gong from persecuting Sheng Xian, Gao Dai went to Xu Province to seek help from the provincial governor, Tao Qian. After Tao Qian showed nominal support for their cause, Xu Gong did not pursue them any further.

When Sun Ce was conquering the commanderies in the Jiangdong region later in 199, Cheng Pu suggested attacking Xu Zhao, but Sun Ce, citing Xu Zhao's giving sanctuary to Sheng Xian and Yan Baihu as indication of Xu Zhao's faithfulness, did not do so. Nonetheless, Sun Ce saw Sheng Xian's reputation as a threat to his own authority, and Sheng Xian's life was in jeopardy. Around 202, Sheng Xian's close friend Kong Rong persuaded Cao Cao to give Sheng Xian an official appointment as protection. Cao Cao thus appointed Sheng Xian as a Cavalry Commandant (騎都尉), but he was killed by Sun Ce's successor, Sun Quan, before the commission reached him.

Two of Sheng Xian's followers, Dai Yuan (戴員) and Gui Lan (媯覽), took revenge against Sun Quan by killing his brother Sun Yi and another relative Sun He (孫河). They planned to defect to Cao Cao through Liu Fu. However, Sun Yi's widow devised a plan to trap them and had them killed to avenge her husband.

Sheng Xian was survived by a son, Sheng Kuang (盛匡), who served under Cao Cao as a military officer.

== See also ==
- Lists of people of the Three Kingdoms
