= Liu Yin (Shu Han) =

Shu Han military officer (c. 190 – 269)

- 柳隱

Administrator of Xihe (西河太守)
- In office 266 – 269
- Monarch: Sima Yan

Consultant (議郎)
- In office 264 – 266
- Monarch: Cao Huan

Commandant of Cavalry (騎都尉)
- In office ?–?
- Monarch: Liu Shan

Administrator of Ba Commandery (巴郡太守)
- In office ?–?
- Monarch: Liu Shan

Officer of the Standard (牙門將)
- In office ?–?
- Monarch: Liu Shan

Personal details
- Born: 190 (Note: Liu Yin's biography in the Huayang Guozhi recorded that he died at the age of 80 (by East Asian age reckoning) in 269. By calculation, his year of birth should be around 190.); Chengdu, Sichuan
- Died: 269 (aged 79); Xihe Commandery, Shanxi
- Children: Liu Chong; Liu Chu
- Occupation: General
- Courtesy name: Xiuran (休然)

Liu Yin (190 – 269), courtesy name Xiuran, was a military officer of the state of Shu Han in the Three Kingdoms period of China. After the fall of Shu in 263, he continued serving under the Cao Wei state, then the succeeding Jin dynasty in 266.

== Life ==
Liu Yin was born in Chengdu, Shu Commandery (蜀郡), which is present-day Chengdu, Sichuan. In his youth, he was well known along with his fellow townspeople Du Zhen (杜禎) and Liu Shen (柳伸). Liu Yin was upright, honest, and sincere. With many close friends. Furthermore, he was skilled in politics. Later, he accompanied the general Jiang Wei during his many northern campaigns where he was known for his strategic thinking, courage and resourcefulness. Among the army, Liu Yin was considered one of the bravest warriors. He held various positions including Officer of the Standard (牙門將), Administrator of Ba Commandery (巴郡太守) and Commandant of Cavalry (騎都尉). He was later reassigned to the post of Garrison Commander (圍督) in Hanzhong.

During the Conquest of Shu by Wei, Zhong Hui invaded the Hanzhong region and captured many forts and strongholds. Only Liu Yin held fast, refusing to surrender. Despite being attacked by a separate force, he remained unyielding and was able to hold out. After his abdication to Deng Ai, Liu Shan sent Liu Yin a handwritten order commanding him to surrender. Only then, he surrendered. Sima Zhao heard of this. He was greatly impressed by his righteous action.

In 264, Liu Yin was transferred to Hedong where he was appointed as Consultant (議郎). When Sima Yan established the Jin dynasty, he assigned Liu Yin as Administrator of Xihe (西河太守). Liu Yin stayed in office for the next three years before resigning on account of his old age. Before his death, he asked for his remains to be sent back to his homeland in the Shu region. He died among his family at the age of 80 (by East Asian age reckoning).

Liu Yin's eldest son, Liu Chong (柳充) served as the Prefect of Liandao (連道令). While his second son, Liu Chu (柳初) was recommended as a xiucai (秀才; person who passed the county level imperial exam).

== Appraisal ==
Chang Qu, who wrote Liu Yin's biography in the Chronicles of Huayang (Huayang Guo Zhi), (Note: Liu Yin's biography is recorded in the eleventh volume of the Huayang Guo Zhi, titled Biographies of later worthies (後賢志), covering the life of notable persons from the Sichuan region who lived during the Jin dynasty.) appraised Liu Yin as follows: "Fierce warrior, possessing both righteousness and virtue."

== Du Zhen ==
Du Zhen (杜禎), whose courtesy name, was Wenran (文然), was the son of Du Qiong. Alongside Liu Shen, they served as Assistant Officer (從事) under Zhuge Liang. He was appointed as Prefect of Insignia and Credentials (符節令) then as Chief Controller (都督) of Liang and Yi provinces. Du Zhen's son, Du Zhen (杜珍), (Note: Note that the Chinese characters for Zhen in their names are different.) whose courtesy name was Bozhong (伯重), served as Protector of the Army (護軍) of Lueyang (略陽). After Cao Wei's abdication to Jin, he was recommended as a xiucai. He had a son, Du Mi (杜彌), whose courtesy name was Jingwen (景文).

== Liu Shen ==
Liu Shen (柳伸), whose courtesy name was Yahou (雅厚), served as Administrator (太守) of Hanjia (漢嘉) and Badong (巴東). His son, Liu Chun (柳純), whose courtesy name was Weishu (偉叔) was famous as a man of virtuous moral character and greatly talented. He was recommended as a xiucai then appointed as Administrator (太守) of Ba Commandery (巴郡), Yidu (宜都) and Jianping (建平). Thereafter, as Colonel (校尉) of Xiyi (西夷) and Changshui (長水). Furthermore, as Supervisor of the Army (監軍) of Badong (巴東).

== See also ==
- Lists of people of the Three Kingdoms
