= Du Qiong (Three Kingdoms) =

Shu Han official, astronomer and diviner (died 250)

- 杜瓊

Minister of Ceremonies (太常)
- In office ?–?
- Monarch: Liu Shan

Minister Herald (大鴻臚)
- In office ?–?
- Monarch: Liu Shan

Left General of the Household (左中郎將)
- In office ?–?
- Monarch: Liu Shan

Counsellor Remonstrant (諫議大夫)
- In office ?–?
- Monarch: Liu Shan

Personal details
- Born: c. 160s Chengdu, Sichuan
- Died: 250 (aged 80s)
- Children: Du Zhen
- Occupation: Official, astronomer, diviner
- Courtesy name: Boyu (伯瑜)

Du Qiong (c. 160s – 250), courtesy name Boyu, was an official, astronomer and diviner of the state of Shu Han in the Three Kingdoms period of China.

== Life ==
Du Qiong was from Chengdu, Shu Commandery (蜀郡), which is present-day Chengdu, Sichuan. In his youth, he studied the Book of Changes together with He Zong (何宗) under the tutelage of Ren An (任安). He specialised in astronomy and divination. Sometime between 194 and 214, Liu Zhang, the Governor of Yi Province (covering present-day Sichuan and Chongqing), recruited Du Qiong to serve under him as an Assistant Officer (從事).

In 214, after the warlord Liu Bei seized control of Yi Province from Liu Zhang, he appointed Du Qiong as an Assistant Officer in the Consultation Bureau (議曹從事) of his administration. Following the end of the Eastern Han dynasty in 220, Du Qiong cited works of divination to urge Liu Bei to declare himself emperor, which Liu Bei did in 221 and established the state of Shu Han of the Three Kingdoms period. After Liu Bei died in 223, Du Qiong continued serving under Liu Bei's son and successor, Liu Shan. During Liu Shan's reign (r. 223–263), Du Qiong held a number of positions, including Counsellor Remonstrant (諫議大夫), Left General of the Household (左中郎將), Minister Herald (大鴻臚) and Minister of Ceremonies (太常). When Zhuge Liang, the Imperial Chancellor of Shu, died in 234, Liu Shan ordered Du Qiong to bring an imperial edict of mourning to Zhuge Liang's tomb and read it out.

Du Qiong was known for being a man of few words and for maintaining a low profile throughout his career. He hardly interacted with his colleagues outside the workplace and stayed in his residence most of the time during non-working hours. Jiang Wan and Fei Yi, who consecutively served as the heads of the Shu central government between 234 and 253, respected and regarded him highly.

Although Du Qiong was well-versed in astronomy, he was initially not known for his knowledge of astronomy until he met his colleague Qiao Zhou, who constantly sought his views on astronomy. Du Qiong told him, "It's not easy to understand astronomy. You should observe the heavens and identify the characteristics of the different types of astronomical phenomena on your own, instead of believing what others tell you. It'll take a lot of effort and time to study astronomy before you can truly understand astronomy. Once you've understood it, however, you'll start to worry about spilling the secrets of the future. I thought it's best to not know, so that's why I stopped observing the heavens."

Qiao Zhou asked Du Qiong, "Zhou Shu once said that the 'something tall on the road' [in the popular saying 'something tall on the road will replace the Han (dynasty)'] refers to the state of Wei. Why do you think it is so?" Du Qiong replied, "Wei (魏) also refers to either of the two viewing towers at each gate of the imperial palace. It faces the road and stands out as a very tall structure from a distance away. (Because Wei was also the name of an ancient state,) the sages decided to use it as a double entendre." When Qiao Zhou sought clarification, Du Qiong further explained, "The term cao (曹) was never used to refer to the positions held by government officials in ancient times. This practice only started in the Han dynasty: clerks are called shu cao (屬曹) and guards are called shi cao (侍曹). This is probably Heaven's will." (Note: Du Qiong was alluding to the replacement of the Eastern Han dynasty by the (Cao) Wei state of the Three Kingdoms period. The Cao family was the ruling family of the (Cao) Wei state. See Zhou Qun's article for more information.)

Du Qiong died in 250 in his 80s. Throughout his life, he wrote over 100,000 Chinese characters in the Han Shi Zhangju (韓詩章句) as a detailed commentary to Han Ying's version of the Classic of Poetry. However, he never accepted any student/apprentice(s) so he had no one to inherit his legacy. (Note: This account is contradicted by the Huayang Guo Zhi, as it is recorded that Gao Wan was a student of Du Qiong. Aside from his personal qualities, Gao Wan served during the Jin dynasty as Court Astronomer (太史令) so he definitely inherited some of Du Qiong's knowledge.)

== Post-mortem events ==
Qiao Zhou used what he learnt from his exchanges with Du Qiong and came up with his own ideas of divination. He once made a prophecy based on Du Qiong's style:

The Spring and Autumn Annals recorded that Marquis Mu of Jin named his elder son and heir apparent "Chou" and his younger son "Chengshi". His adviser Shifu (師服) told him, 'What weird names you have given your sons! A ruler calls his favourite consorts fei (妃) and his less favoured consorts chou (仇). Now, when you name your elder son chou and your younger son chengshi (literally: "form an army"), aren't you sowing the seeds for an internal conflict by instigating your younger son to (form an army and rebel and) replace his brother (a "less favoured" heir apparent)?' The scenario which Shifu described became reality later.

Emperor Ling of Han called his sons "Marquis of Shi" (史侯) and "Marquis of Hou" (董侯). Although both of them were emperors at some point of time in their lives, they ultimately ended up being removed from the throne and reduced to the status of lesser nobles. This resonates with what Shifu talked about.

The Late Emperor's given name was "Bei" (備), which implies "well-furnished"; His Majesty's given name is "Shan" (禪), which implies "giving away". Does this mean that the Liu family is already so "well-furnished" that they should "give away" (their throne)? Their names are even more inauspicious than those of Marquis Mu and Emperor Ling's sons.

In 262, when the eunuch Huang Hao was in power in Shu, a big tree in the imperial palace suddenly collapsed. Qiao Zhou became worried but he could not find someone to talk to, so he wrote a 12-character mantra on a pillar which foreshadowed the conquest of Shu by Wei a year later. After the fall of Shu, when people praised Qiao Zhou for making an accurate prediction, he said, "I may have thought about this myself, but I only came up with it after expanding and deriving from the sayings of Du Qiong. I didn't use any special power or ability to predict the future."

== See also ==
- Lists of people of the Three Kingdoms
