= Battle of Yangcheng =

Battle between the warlords Yuan Shao and Yuan Shu (191)

- Part of the wars at the end of the Han dynasty
Date	191 CE
Location	Dengfeng, Henan 34°27′19″N 113°01′31″E
Result	Yuan Shu victory

Belligerents
Yuan Shao	Yuan Shu

Commanders and leaders
Zhou Yu (Renming); Zhou Ang	Sun Jian; Gongsun Yue †

Battle of Yangcheng
- Traditional Chinese: 陽城之戰
- Simplified Chinese: 阳城之战
Transcriptions
Standard Mandarin
- Hanyu Pinyin: Yángchéng Zhī Zhàn

The Battle of Yangcheng was fought between the warlords Yuan Shao and Yuan Shu as the coalition against Dong Zhuo fell apart in 191 in the late Eastern Han dynasty. Sun Jian, Yuan Shu's nominal subordinate returning from his triumphant capture of the abandoned capital of Luoyang, became involved in Yuan Shao's and Yuan Shu's personal feud as the former allies turned against one another. Yuan Shao's forces, under Zhou Yu, first got the upper hand against Sun Jian's forces, but were beaten back by Sun's counterattack.

== Background ==
In 190, regional warlords and officials from across China formed a coalition against Chancellor of State Dong Zhuo, who controlled state power and held Emperor Xian hostage. Yuan Shao was elected leader of the alliance. To participate in the campaign against Dong Zhuo, Sun Jian led an army north to join Yuan Shu, who was part of the coalition. Yuan Shu appointed Sun Jian as Acting General Who Smashes the Caitiffs (破虜將軍) and Inspector of Yu Province (豫州刺史), and sent him to attack Dong Zhuo at the capital city of Luoyang. Sun Jian defeated Dong Zhuo's forces, causing Dong to set fire to Luoyang and force its people to move to Chang'an, where the new capital was situated. Sun Jian's capture of Luoyang, in ruins, was militarily untenable since the other members of the alliance had no mind to reinforce his position, while they themselves were on the verge of dissolution. Sun abandoned Luoyang and made his way back south.

Yuan Shu, apparently dissatisfied that his cousin Yuan Shao was elected coalition leader and received all the prestige that came with his appointment, insulted his cousin as "a family slave" and "not a true son of the Yuan clan". Yuan Shao was predictably angry at this. In 191, he named Zhou Yu as Inspector of Yu Province, a title to which Sun Jian was entitled, and sent him to attack Sun's territories in Yu Province while Sun was away.

Zhou Yu decided to attack Yangcheng of Yingchuan Commandery (潁川; southeast of present-day Dengfeng, Henan). Originally, an outpost was set up here by Sun Jian during his march north against Dong Zhuo, and the outpost remained to watch for possible attacks from Dong Zhuo from the west after Sun Jian left Luoyang. Although the city of Yangcheng belonged under Sun Jian's government in Yu Province, it was also within Yuan Shao's sphere of influence in Ji Province (冀州), and thus it was a sensible target for Yuan's aggression.

== Battle ==
Not expecting an attack from a nominal ally, Yangcheng was taken by surprise. When Sun Jian heard of the attack, he sighed and commented:

Together we rallied troops of righteousness, with a purpose of saving the nation. The rebels and bandits are on the point of destruction, and yet people can act like this. Whom can I work with?

The northern warlord Gongsun Zan sided with Yuan Shu, and sent his cousin Gongsun Yue with 1,000 horsemen to Yuan Shu. Gongsun Yue and his horsemen were to accompany Sun Jian in the battle to retake Yangcheng, but in the initial skirmishes Gongsun Yue was killed by an arrow. Despite the setbacks, Sun Jian recovered some time later and defeated Zhou Yu in several battles. Then Yuan Shu led an attack southeast on Zhou Yu's brother Zhou Ang in Jiujiang, which compelled Zhou Yu to abandon Yangcheng to go to his brother's aid. There Zhou Yu was defeated again, and he abandoned the campaign to return to his hometown of Kuaiji (modern Shaoxing in Zhejiang).

== Aftermath ==
The first battles between Yuan Shao and Yuan Shu ended in the latter's favour: he had engaged and defeated Yuan Shao's forces in both Yangcheng and Jiujiang, restored the position in Yingchuan under Sun Jian, and eliminated Zhou Yu as a threat once and for all although Jiujiang was not yet conquered. For Yuan Shao, on the other hand, the situation was extremely difficult: besides the failure in the south, he was also under threat from Gongsun Zan, who held Yuan Shao responsible for the death of Gongsun Yue and declared war against him, rejecting all of Yuan Shao's protestations of goodwill. This led to the clash between Yuan Shao and Gongsun Zan in the Battle of Jieqiao.

The battle of Yangcheng, being the first moves in the struggle between the two Yuans, marked the beginning of a new stage in the confusion of wars which brought the end of the Han dynasty. The battle was notable as a confirmation of the death of the alliance against Dong Zhuo as the warlords of the North China Plain start to battle each other for the ultimate dominion of China.
