= Zhou Yu (Renming) =

Han dynasty official and soldier (died c. 192)

- 周喁

Inspector of Yu Province by Yuan Shao (豫州刺史)
- In office 191 – 192
- Monarch: Emperor Xian of Han

Personal details
- Born: Unknown Shaoxing, Zhejiang
- Died: Unknown Shaoxing, Zhejiang
- Relations: Zhou Ang (brother); Zhou Xin (brother)
- Occupation: Military general, politician
- Courtesy name: Renming (仁明)

Zhou Yu (Note: Not the same person as the official who served under Sun Ce and Sun Quan) (fl. 190s), courtesy name Renming, was a Chinese military general and politician who lived during the late Eastern Han dynasty of China. He was from Kuaiji Commandery, which is around present-day Shaoxing, Zhejiang. He had two brothers: Zhou Ang and Zhou Xin.

In 189, when the warlord Cao Cao was recruiting soldiers to participate in a campaign against the warlord Dong Zhuo, who controlled the Han central government from 189 to 192, Zhou Yu managed to draft 2,000 soldiers and he brought them along to join Cao Cao. He became a subordinate of the warlord Yuan Shao later and was appointed as the Inspector (刺史) of Yu Province.

In 191, Zhou Yu fought on Yuan Shao's side at the Battle of Yangcheng against Yuan Shao's half-brother and rival Yuan Shu, whose forces were led by his ally Sun Jian. Although Zhou Yu gained the upper hand in the initial stages of the battle, he eventually lost to Sun Jian. In historical records, however, it is erroneously recorded that Zhou Yu's brother Zhou Ang was the one who was involved.

In 192, Zhou Yu and his brother Zhou Ang were defeated in a battle at Yinling County (陰陵縣; northwest of present-day Changfeng County, Anhui) against Yuan Shu's forces. After the battle, he returned to his home in Kuaiji Commandery, where he was murdered by Xu Gong, the Administrator of Wu Commandery.

== See also ==
- Lists of people of the Three Kingdoms
