= Zhang Yu (Nanhe) =

Chinese official, diviner and physiognomist (died c.219)

- 張裕

Major of the Rear Section (後部司馬)
- In office 214 – 219
- Governor: Liu Bei

Assistant Officer (從事)
- In office ? – 214
- Governor: Liu Zhang

Personal details
- Born: Unknown date Shu Commandery, Han Empire (present-day Sichuan)
- Died: c. 219
- Occupation: Official, diviner, physiognomist
- Courtesy name: Nanhe (南和)

Zhang Yu (died c. 219), courtesy name Nanhe, was an official, diviner and physiognomist who served under the warlords Liu Zhang and Liu Bei in the late Eastern Han dynasty of China.

== Life ==
Zhang Yu was from Shu Commandery (蜀郡), which is based in present-day Chengdu, Sichuan, but he might not necessarily be from Chengdu since there were other counties in Shu Commandery. He started his career as an Assistant Officer (從事) under Liu Zhang, the Governor of Yi Province (covering present-day Sichuan and Chongqing).

In late 211, Liu Zhang invited the warlord Liu Bei, who was based in southern Jing Province (covering present-day Hubei and Hunan), to lead his troops into Yi Province to help him counter the threat of another warlord Zhang Lu in Hanzhong Commandery. Zhang Yu accompanied Liu Zhang when he met Liu Bei for a reception banquet in Fu County (涪縣; present-day Mianyang, Sichuan). During the banquet, Liu Bei saw that Zhang Yu had a thick beard, so he came up with a joke to make fun of Zhang Yu: "When I was in Zhuo County (涿縣), there were many people with the family name Mao. They were everywhere, be it north, south, east or west. The Prefect even remarked, 'Zhuo County is surrounded by Maos!'" (Note: It was a pun on a polyseme and homophones. The Chinese character mao (毛) literally means "hair" and is used as family name. The place name Zhuo (涿) is homophonic to zhuo (啄), which means "a beak". So the joke can be understood as "The mouth is surrounded by thick hair!".) Zhang Yu also cracked a joke to get back at Liu Bei: "Once upon a time, there was a certain Prefect of Lu County (潞縣) who was later reassigned to Zhuo County. After he retired, someone wanted to write him a letter but didn't know how to address him in a way that reflected the two appointments he held, so he thought of the term 'Gentleman of Lu-Zhuo' (潞涿君). (Note: It was a pun on homophones. The place name Lu (潞) is homophonic to lu (露), which means "to expose". So it was to address someone who exposed his mouth. "Gentleman of Lu-Zhuo" (潞涿君) became a Chinese idiom. See the "dictionary definition".) Zhang Yu's joke was meant to mock Liu Bei, who had no beard.

In 214, after Liu Bei seized control of Yi Province from Liu Zhang, he appointed Zhang Yu as a Major of the Rear Section (後部司馬) in his new administration. Around 217, when Liu Bei planned to launch a campaign to seize the strategic Hanzhong Commandery from his rival Cao Cao, he consulted Zhou Qun and asked him to predict the outcome. Zhou Qun told him that he would gain the territories in Hanzhong Commandery but not its people, and advised him to not send a detachment of his main army to attack the enemy. At the time, Zhang Yu, who was known for being better than Zhou Qun in divining the future, advised Liu Bei against launching the Hanzhong Campaign. Liu Bei ignored their advice and went ahead anyway. As Zhou Qun predicted, Liu Bei defeated Cao Cao and captured the territories in Hanzhong Commandery but not its people because they had already migrated elsewhere. During the campaign, Liu Bei also ordered Wu Lan (吳蘭) and Lei Tong (雷銅) to lead a detachment of troops from his main army to attack Wudu Commandery (武都郡; around present-day Longnan, Gansu), but, as Zhou Qun warned him, this detachment ended up being completely destroyed by Cao Cao's forces. After the successful conquest of Hanzhong, Liu Bei nominated Zhou Qun as a maocai (茂才; a cultivated talent recommended for a government post), probably to commend him for his earlier advice, but did not do the same for Zhang Yu.

Zhang Yu once privately made a prediction: "In the gengzi year, the ruling dynasty will change and the Liu clan's reign will come to an end. Our lord (Liu Bei) may have conquered Yi Province, but nine years later he will lose it between the yin and mao years." Someone secretly informed Liu Bei about his prediction.

Liu Bei had been holding a grudge against Zhang Yu since the incident in Fu County, so he became angrier when he heard that Zhang Yu was predicting his downfall, and decided to take revenge against Zhang Yu. He accused Zhang Yu of making an inaccurate prediction about the Hanzhong Campaign, imprisoned him, and wanted to execute him. When Zhuge Liang pleaded with Liu Bei to spare Zhang Yu, Liu Bei said, "When something blocks your doorway, even if it were pretty flowers, you'll have to get rid of it." As Zhang Yu was well-versed in physiognomy, every time he saw his reflection in the mirror he hurled it onto the floor, because he knew he would die by execution. Zhang Yu was subsequently executed by beheading and his body was dumped into the street.

Zhang Yu's prediction about the end of the Liu clan's reign came true in the year 220 (a gengzi year in the sexagenary cycle) when the Cao Wei state replaced the Liu clan's Eastern Han dynasty. Liu Bei also died on 10 June 223, about nine years after he seized Yi Province from Liu Zhang in June 214; his year of death (223) was also a (gui)mao year in the sexagenary cycle and the year before (222) was a (ren)yin year.

Zhang Yu once foretold Deng Zhi's future by telling him that he would rise to the position of General-in-Chief (大將軍) and gain a marquis title after he turned 70.

== See also ==
- Lists of people of the Three Kingdoms
