= Zhou Qun =

3rd-century Chinese official, astronomer and diviner

- 周羣 / 周群

Colonel of the Scholars (儒林校尉) (acting)
- In office 214 – ?
- Governor: Liu Bei

Assistant Officer for Education (師友從事)
- In office ? – 214
- Governor: Liu Zhang

Personal details
- Born: Unknown date Langzhong, Han Empire (In present-day Sichuan)
- Died: Unknown date
- Children: Zhou Ju
- Parent: Zhou Shu (father)
- Occupation: Official, astronomer, diviner
- Courtesy name: Zhongzhi (仲直)

Zhou Qun (fl. 190s – 210s), courtesy name Zhongzhi, was an official, astronomer and diviner who served under the warlords Liu Zhang and Liu Bei in the late Eastern Han dynasty of China. Two of his interpretations of comets are preserved in volumes 102–104 of the Book of the Later Han, presumably through quotation by Qiao Zhou.

== Life ==
Zhou Qun was from Langzhong County (閬中縣), Baxi Commandery (巴西郡), which is present-day Langzhong, Sichuan. His father, Zhou Shu (周舒), whose courtesy name was Shubu (叔布), was mentored by the scholar Yang Hou (楊厚) from Guanghan Commandery (廣漢郡; around present-day Guanghan, Sichuan). Zhou Shu was second to two famous scholars, Dong Fu (董扶) and Ren An (任安), in terms of fame. On many occasions, he received invitations and offers to serve in the government of the Eastern Han dynasty, but he turned down all of them. Someone once asked him, "The Spring and Autumn Annals mentioned 'something tall on the road will replace the Han (dynasty)'. What does this mean?" Zhou Shu replied, "That 'something tall on the road' refers to Wei." (Note: See Du Qiong's article for an explanation on what this saying means.) Other scholars in his hometown who heard him secretly shared and circulated what he said.

As a child, Zhou Qun studied under the tutelage of his father and became well-versed in astronomy and divination. As he was born in a wealthy family with scores of servants, he built an observation tower in his residence, and ordered his servants to take shifts to observe the sky round the clock and keep him updated. Whenever there was something unusual, he would rush to the tower to see it for himself, regardless of whether it was in the day or at night. He was thus able to predict future events based on his observations. Sometime between 194 and 214, when Liu Zhang was the Governor of Yi Province (covering present-day Sichuan and Chongqing), he recruited Zhou Qun to serve in his administration as an Assistant Officer for Education (師友從事).

In 202, when there were reports of a trans woman in Yuexi/Yuesui Commandery (越巂郡; around present-day Xichang, Sichuan), Zhou Qun interpreted this as a sign that the ruling dynasty would change soon, because the last time something similar happened, the Xin dynasty replaced the Western Han dynasty. In 220, Zhou Qun's prediction came true as the Cao Wei state replaced the Eastern Han dynasty.

In 207, when Zhou Qun saw an astronomical phenomenon, he said that the Governor of Jing Province would die soon and lose control over the province. In the autumn of 208, he was proven right as Liu Biao died and Jing Province came under the control of the warlord Cao Cao.

In January 213, after seeing another astronomical phenomenon, Zhou Qun predicted that the warlords in western China would lose their territories. At the time in western China, Liu Zhang controlled Yi Province (covering present-day Sichuan and Chongqing), Zhang Lu controlled Hanzhong Commandery, Han Sui controlled Liang Province (涼州; covering present-day Ningxia and parts of Gansu, Qinghai, Xinjiang and Inner Mongolia), and Song Jian (宋建) ruled Fuhan County (枹罕縣; southwest of present-day Linxia, Gansu). In the following year, the warlord Cao Cao sent his subordinates to lead troops to attack the various warlords in Liang Province. By early 214, Cao Cao's forces had eliminated Song Jian and defeated Han Sui, who met his end while taking shelter under the Qiang tribes following his defeat. By the autumn of 214, the warlord Liu Bei had defeated Liu Zhang and seized control of Yi Province from him. In the autumn of 215, Cao Cao defeated Zhang Lu at the Battle of Yangping and conquered Hanzhong Commandery.

In 214, after the warlord Liu Bei took control of Yi Province, he appointed Zhou Qun as acting Colonel of the Scholars (儒林校尉) in his administration. Around 217, when Liu Bei was planning to launch a campaign to seize control of Hanzhong Commandery from his rival Cao Cao, he consulted Zhou Qun and asked him to predict the outcome. Zhou Qun said, "You will get the territory but you won't have its people. If you send a detachment of your main army to attack (instead of sending your main army), you will lose the battle. You should be very careful about this!" At the time, Zhang Yu, another diviner serving under Liu Bei, also said, "If you attack Hanzhong, your army will suffer a defeat." Liu Bei ignored their advice and proceeded with the campaign. Just as Zhou Qun predicted, Liu Bei defeated Cao Cao in the Hanzhong Campaign and captured the territories but not its people because they had already migrated elsewhere. During the campaign, Liu Bei also ordered Wu Lan (吳蘭) and Lei Tong (雷銅) to lead a detachment of troops from his main army to attack Wudu Commandery (武都郡; around present-day Longnan, Gansu), but, as Zhou Qun warned him, this detachment ended up being completely destroyed by Cao Cao's forces.

Liu Bei later nominated Zhou Qun as a maocai (茂才; a cultivated talent recommended for a government post). Zhou Qun died in an unknown year. His son, Zhou Ju (周巨), inherited much of his knowledge and skills.

== Anecdote ==
According to the Shi Yi Ji, Zhou Qun used to study astronomy as a hobby and not in a serious manner. One day, while he was gathering herbs in the Min Mountains, he encountered a white ape who climbed down from a steep cliff and stood right in front of him. When he threw his scraping knife at the ape, it transformed into an old man carrying an eight-chi-long jade tablet. As the old man gave him the tablet, Zhou Qun asked him, "When were you born?"

The old man replied:

"I'm so old that I've forgotten when I was born, but I remember the days of the Yellow Emperor when I started studying astronomy. Fenghou (風后) and Rongcheng (容成), who served as the Yellow Emperor's historians, learnt astronomy from me. When it came to Cangjie's time, I studied the movements of the sun, moon and stars, and noticed many discrepancies. In the Spring and Autumn period, people like Ziwei (子韋), Ziye (子野) and Bizao (禆竈) managed to think of more accurate means of calculating time, but they never truly grasped the essence of astronomy. In more recent times, as the ruling dynasty keeps changing, astronomers only inherit the knowledge of their predecessors and do not make any progress. During the Han dynasty, there was one Luoxia Hong who understood the complexities of astronomy very well."

Zhou Qun felt so inspired by the old man's words that he put in more effort into studying astronomy from then on. Through his studies and observations, he determined that the state of Shu was destined to fall. The people of Shu called Zhou Qun the "Later Sage" (後聖), while the people of Shu's ally state Wu praised him for his expertise in astronomy and divination.

== See also ==
- Lists of people of the Three Kingdoms
