= Zhou Xuan (Three Kingdoms) =

Zhou Xuan (Chinese: 周宣), courtesy name Konghe (Chinese: 孔和), was an Eastern Han and Three Kingdoms dream interpreter.

== Life ==
Zhou Xuan was from Le'an Commandery and served as a local official in the commandery. A famous dream interpreter, Cao Pi made Zhou a palace attendant and appointed him to a post in the office of the grand astrologer. He died in the last years of Cao Rui's reign.

The bibliography of the Book of Sui lists Zhou Xuan's book Zhanmengshu (占夢書) as having 1 juan (volume), while the bibliographies of the Old Book of Tang and New Book of Tang record it as having 3 juan.

== Dream interpretations ==
Zhou was perhaps the most famous dream interpreter of the Three Kingdoms period. The Records of the Three Kingdoms records that Zhou Xuan was accurate eight or nine times out of ten, and that is skills were compared to those of Zhu Jianping in physiognomy. His biography in the Records of the Three Kingdoms records a string of his accurate predictions.

Once Yang Pei (probably Zhou's supervisor in the commandery), during the time of the Yellow Turban Rebellion, had a dream where someone said to him: "On the first day of the eighth month Cao Cao will arrive. He will present you with a staff and fête you with medicinal wine." Zhou Xuan interpreted the dream as: "A staff helps the weak to stand. Medicines cure illness. On the first day of the eighth month the rebels will be eliminated." When the day came, the rebels were defeated.

Later, Liu Zhen dreamed that a snake with four legs lived in a hollow in his gatehouse. Zhou interpreted this dream as: "This is a dream concerning the realm, not your family. It means that women who are bandits will be killed," as snakes were usually an auspicious sign for women, and legs are something a snake is not supposed to have. When the day came, the rebels were defeated.

Cao Pi once said to Zhou Xuan: "I dreamed that two tiles fell from the palace ceiling and transformed into a pair of ducks. What does it mean?" Zhou replied: "In the rear palace someone will die violently." But the ruler said, "I was only tricking you." Zhou responded: "Dreams are simply thoughts. If they can be put into words, they can be used to divine good or bad fortune." He had hardly finished speaking when the prefect of the yellow gate (黃門令) reported that there had been a murder among the palace women.

Later Cao Pi asked: "Last night I dreamed that a green vapor from the ground and filled the heavens." Zhou interpreted this as: "Somewhere under heaven a noblewoman will die unjustly." At the time Cao Pi had already dispatched a messenger to serve an imperial sentence on Lady Zhen. Upon hearing this, he regretted his action and sent another messenger but he did not arrive in time. Cao Pi also asked: "I dreamed I was rubbing the image on a coin, trying to make it disappear, but the design only grew brighter. What does it mean?" Zhou said: "This arises from a matter in your household. Although you wish for something, the imperial mother will not permit it. That is why the pattern only grows brighter despite your desire to rub it away." At the time Cao Pi wanted to discipline his younger brother Cao Zhi, but his mother would only permit a reduction in rank.

Once someone asked Zhou to interpret a dream that he had of a straw dog. He replied: "You are about to have something delicious to eat." Not long afterward, the man was traveling and was invited to a sumptuous feast. Later he asked Zhou to interpret the same dream. Zhou said: "You will fall from a carriage and break a leg. Please take care!" Soon afterward that indeed happened. Afterward, the man asked Zhou to interpret the same dream once again. Zhou said: "Your house will be destroyed in a fire. Please take precautions!" Soon afterward his house indeed caught on fire. Then the man told Zhou: "None of these three dreams really occurred. I was only testing you. How is it that your predictions were nevertheless accurate?" Zhou replied: "That was due to the spirits moving you to speak. It was therefore no different than if you had really dreamed those things." Later, Zhou explained that "Straw dogs are objects used in sacrificing to spirits. That’s how I knew after your first dream that you would attend a feast. After sacrificial offerings are concluded, straw dogs are run over by cart wheels. That’s how I knew after your second dream that you would fall from a carriage and break your leg. After straw dogs are crushed by the cart, they are loaded up to be used as fuel for fire. That’s how I knew after your last dream that your house would burn."

== Bibliography ==
- Campany, Robert Ford (2020). The Chinese Dreamscape, 300 BCE-800 CE. ISBN 9780674247796.
