= Yinan County =

Yinan County 沂南县 Inan
- County
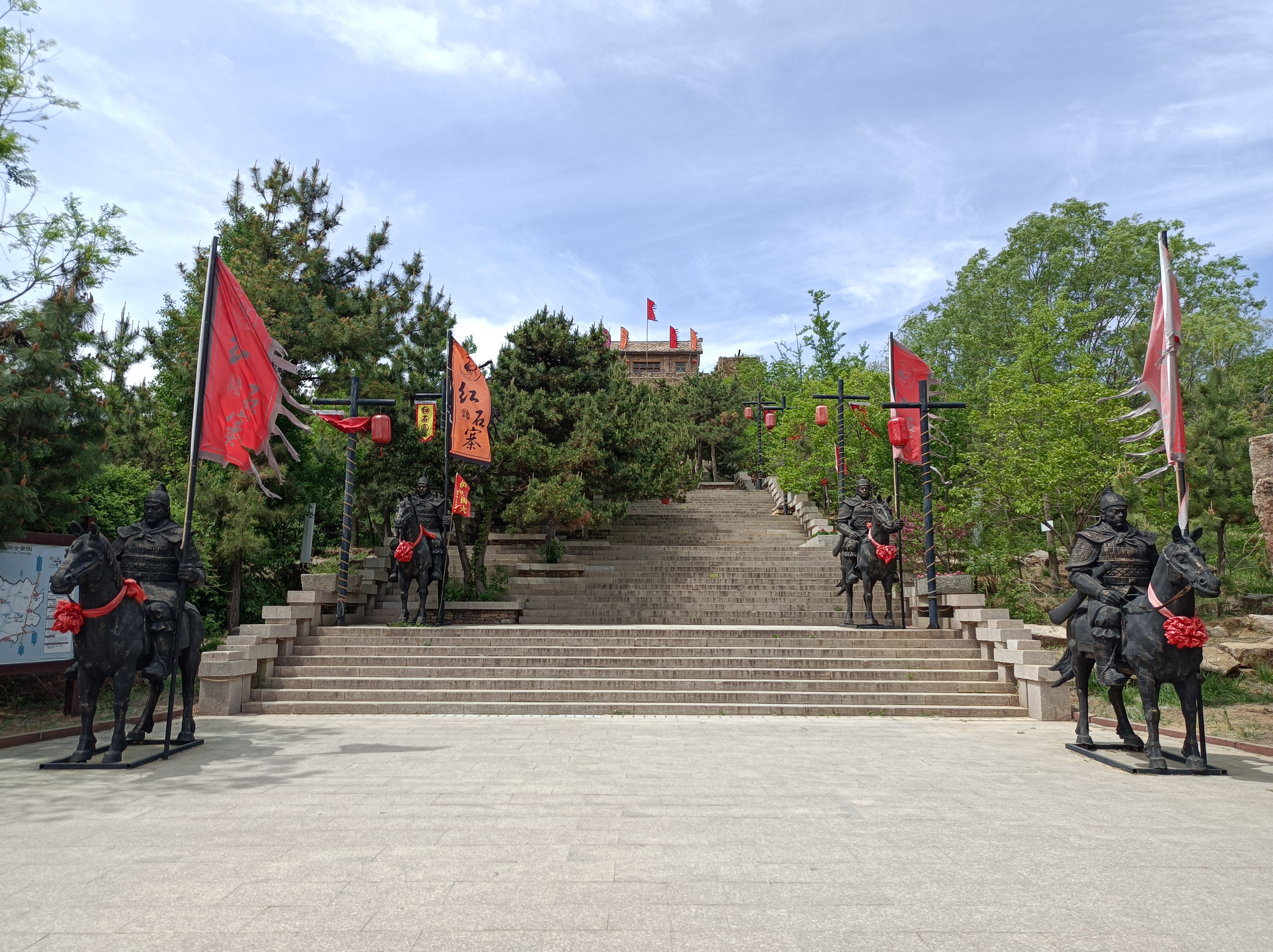
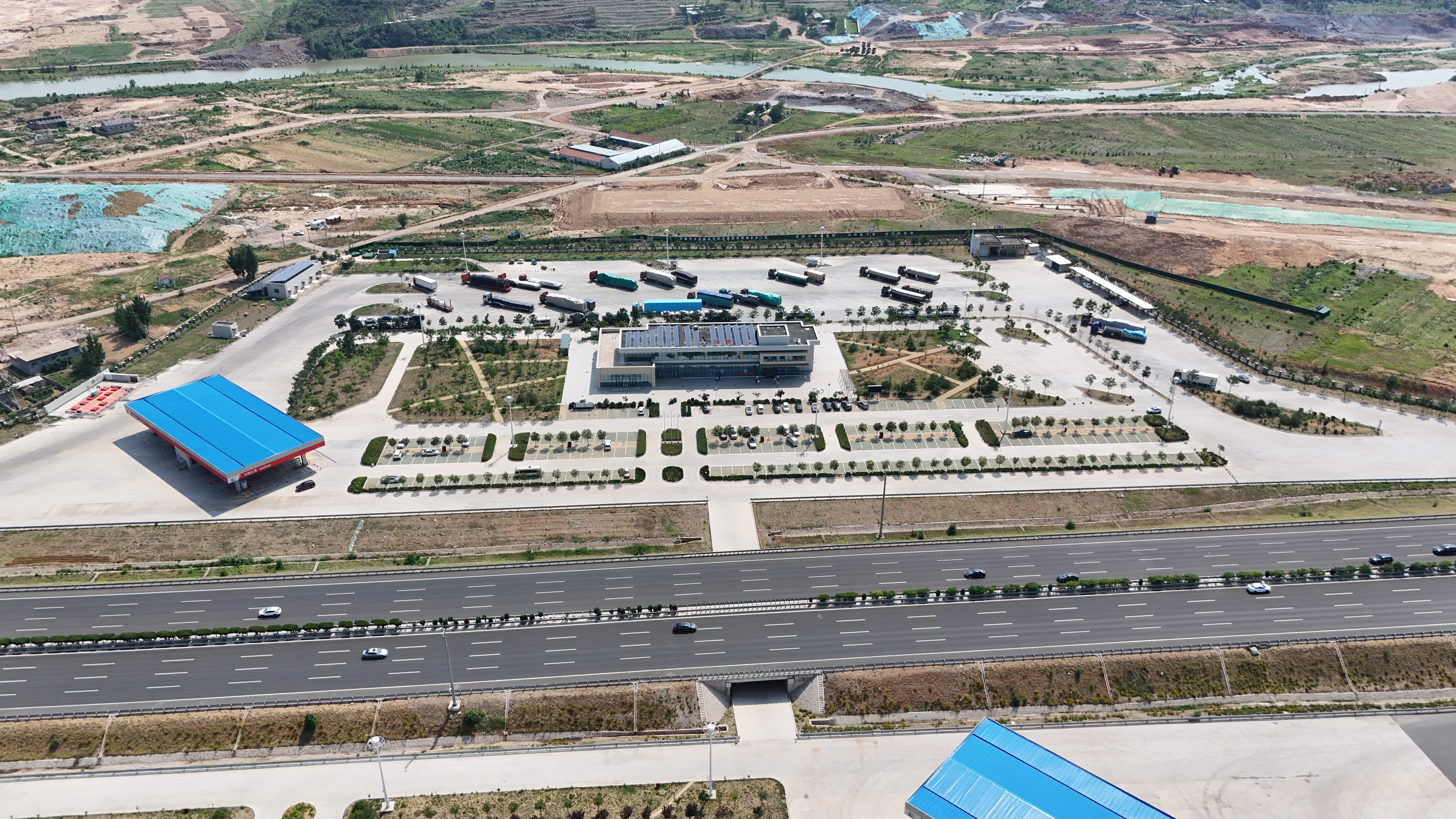
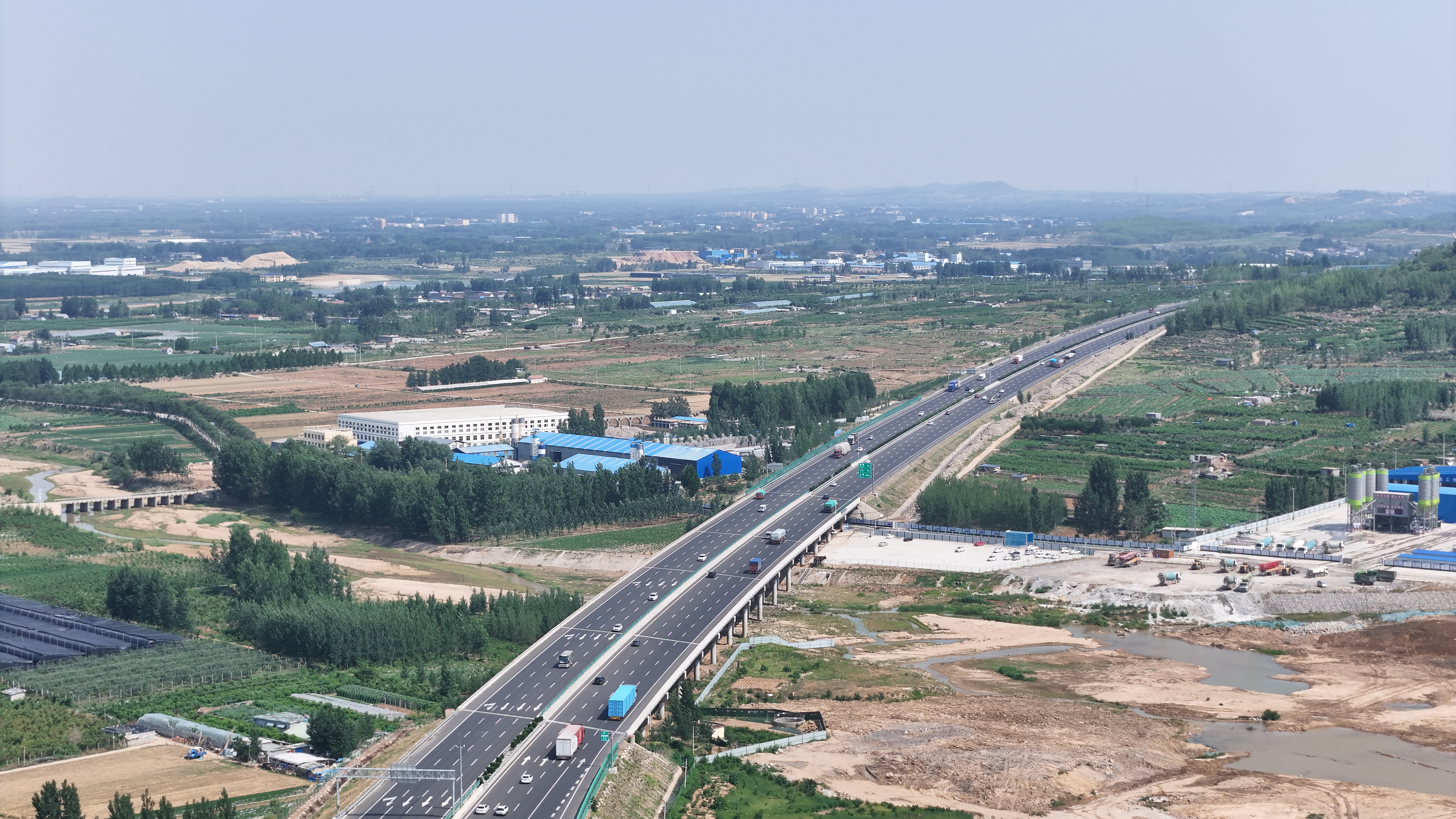
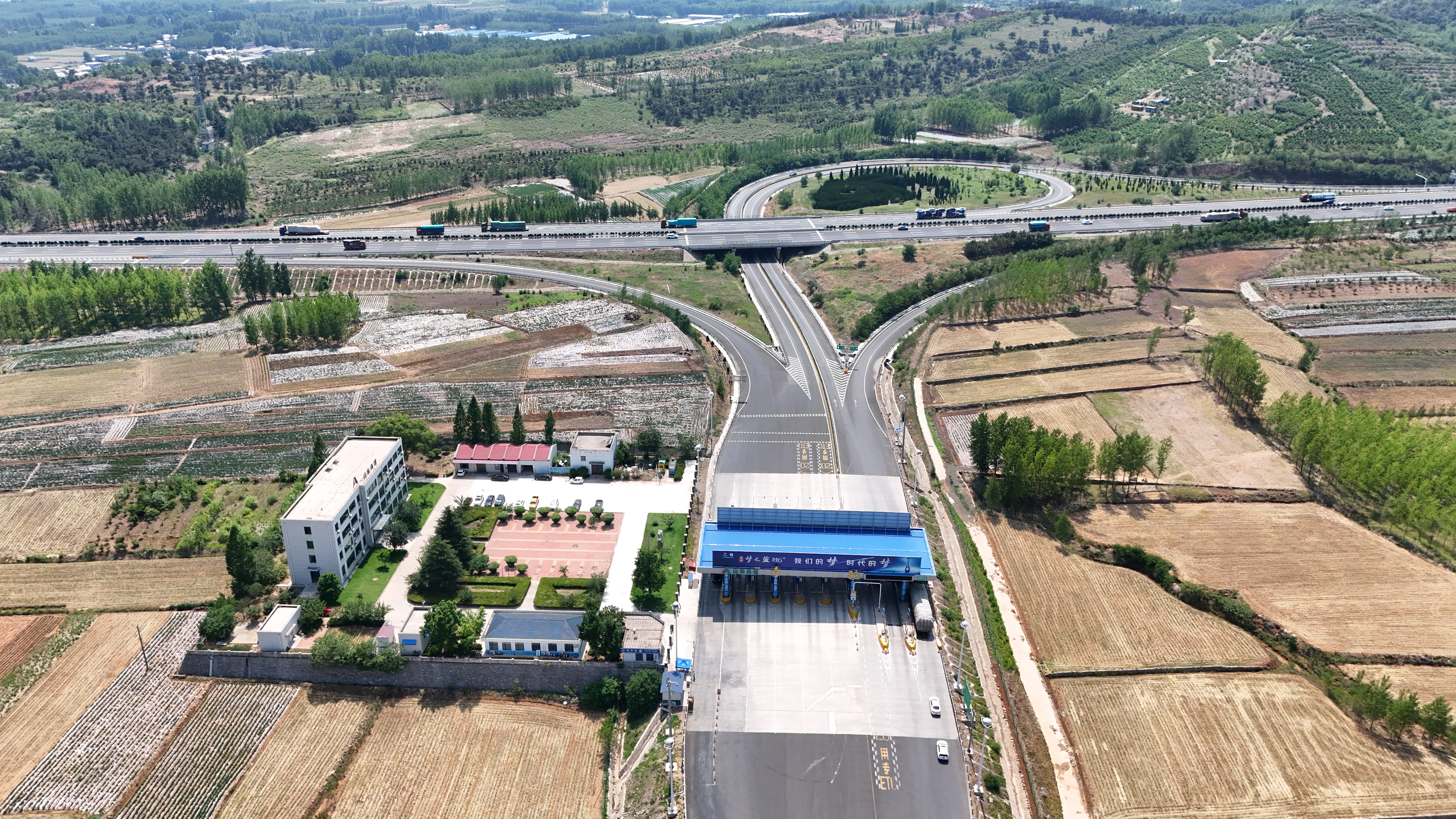

- Location of the seat in Shandong
- Coordinates: 35°33′00″N 118°27′55″E
- Country: People's Republic of China
- Province: Shandong
- Prefecture-level city: Linyi

Area
  - Total: 1,719 km^{2} (664 sq mi)

Population (2019)
  - Total: 838,000
  - Density: 487/km^{2} (1,260/sq mi)
- Time zone: UTC+8 (China Standard)
- Postal code: 276300

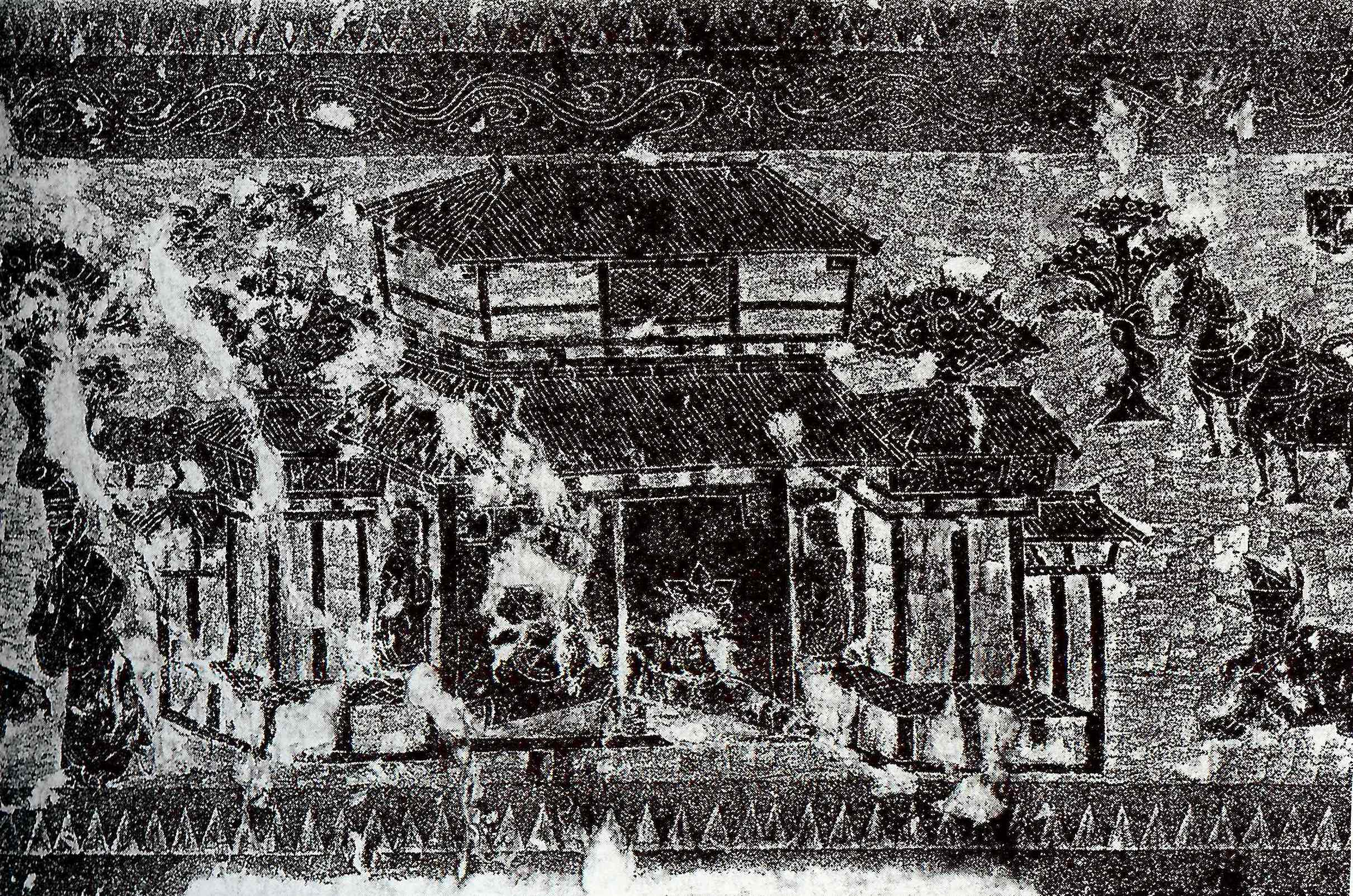
A rubbing of a Han dynasty (202 BC – 220 AD) pictorial stone from the Yinan tombs showing an ancestral shrine with closed doors

Yinan (simplified Chinese: 沂南县; traditional Chinese: 沂南縣; pinyin: Yínán Xiàn; lit. 'Yi (River) south') is a county in the south of Shandong province, China. It is under the administration of the prefecture-level city of Linyi.

The population was 896,467 in 1999. As of the end of 2022, Yinan County had a resident population of 791,900 people.

== Administrative divisions ==
Towns:

- Jiehu (界湖镇), Andi (岸堤镇), Sunzu (孙祖镇), Shuanghou (双堠镇), Qingtuo (青驼镇), Zhangzhuang (张庄镇), Zhuanbu (砖埠镇), Gegou (葛沟镇), Yangjiapo (杨家坡镇), Dazhuang (大庄镇), Xinji (辛集镇), Puwang (蒲汪镇), Hutou (湖头镇), Sucun (苏村镇), Tongjing (铜井镇), Yiwen (依汶镇)

The only township is Mamuchi Township (马牧池乡)

== Climate ==
Climate data for Yinan, elevation 119 m (390 ft), (1991–2020 normals, extremes 1981–present)
Month	Jan	Feb	Mar	Apr	May	Jun	Jul	Aug	Sep	Oct	Nov	Dec	Year
Record high °C (°F)	16.0 (60.8)	23.8 (74.8)	31.3 (88.3)	34.9 (94.8)	38.9 (102.0)	38.6 (101.5)	41.8 (107.2)	38.3 (100.9)	38.1 (100.6)	34.7 (94.5)	26.5 (79.7)	19.2 (66.6)	41.8 (107.2)
Mean daily maximum °C (°F)	4.4 (39.9)	7.7 (45.9)	13.9 (57.0)	20.9 (69.6)	26.4 (79.5)	29.8 (85.6)	30.9 (87.6)	30.0 (86.0)	26.6 (79.9)	21.2 (70.2)	13.3 (55.9)	6.4 (43.5)	19.3 (66.7)
Daily mean °C (°F)	−1.1 (30.0)	1.9 (35.4)	7.6 (45.7)	14.4 (57.9)	20.2 (68.4)	24.0 (75.2)	26.3 (79.3)	25.5 (77.9)	21.2 (70.2)	15.0 (59.0)	7.6 (45.7)	1.0 (33.8)	13.6 (56.5)
Mean daily minimum °C (°F)	−5.3 (22.5)	−2.8 (27.0)	2.1 (35.8)	8.5 (47.3)	14.3 (57.7)	19.0 (66.2)	22.7 (72.9)	22.0 (71.6)	16.8 (62.2)	10.0 (50.0)	3.0 (37.4)	−3.2 (26.2)	8.9 (48.1)
Record low °C (°F)	−15.9 (3.4)	−14.6 (5.7)	−9.0 (15.8)	−3.8 (25.2)	3.8 (38.8)	10.7 (51.3)	16.7 (62.1)	12.6 (54.7)	6.6 (43.9)	−1.4 (29.5)	−9.3 (15.3)	−16.0 (3.2)	−16.0 (3.2)
Average precipitation mm (inches)	10.2 (0.40)	16.3 (0.64)	18.2 (0.72)	36.2 (1.43)	63.8 (2.51)	100.1 (3.94)	206.3 (8.12)	209.6 (8.25)	67.3 (2.65)	30.2 (1.19)	31.4 (1.24)	14.4 (0.57)	804 (31.66)
Average precipitation days (≥ 0.1 mm)	3.4	4.1	4.0	6.2	7.4	8.5	13.1	12.8	7.2	5.5	5.3	3.6	81.1
Average snowy days	3.3	2.9	0.9	0.1	0	0	0	0	0	0	0.7	2.0	9.9
Average relative humidity (%)	61	59	55	56	61	68	80	81	74	68	66	63	66
Mean monthly sunshine hours	155.1	157.6	202.2	222.1	242.2	204.4	178.7	184.2	187.5	186.0	156.8	160.3	2,237.1
Percentage possible sunshine	50	51	54	56	56	47	41	45	51	54	51	53	51
Source: China Meteorological Administration all-time August high

Yinan County has a warm temperate semi-humid monsoon zone climate.Influenced by the monsoon is more obvious, and the four seasons are distinct.

== Notable people ==
- Zhuge Liang (181-234 AD), inventor, and strategist under the Shu Han state during the Three Kingdoms period in China.
- Chen Guangcheng (born 1971, in Dongshigu Village (东师古村), Shuanghou town), human rights defender (under unofficial house arrest in 2011-2012, his six-year-old daughter not being allowed to attend school).

== Main tourist attractions ==
Hongshizhai Xiangshan Lake Tourist Area. The Xiangshan Lake area of the tourist area is close to the Yimeng Ecological Avenue and surrounded by hills to the south, north and west. Its waterfront cliffs are topped with upright rocks, providing characteristic stone for the building.

Menglianggu National Forest Park. It is a natural scenic area integrating natural landscape, Yimeng red culture and ancient historical culture. The main peak of Yinan Scenic Area is 536 meters above sea level, which is named after Mengliang, who was a troop commander in Song Dynasty.

Zhuge Liang Cultural Tourism Zone. The entire upper half of Wolong Mountain is covered with strange stones, and the lower half of the mountain is dominated by the life of Zhuge Liang, with the construction of Zhuge Liang Bronze Statue Square, Ten Mile Han Street, Qianlong Imperial Monument Pavilion, Zhuge Zongshi and other attractions. The landmark of the tourist area is the volume and weight of the world's largest bronze statue of Zhuge Liang.

Zhuquan Village Tourist Resort. The tourist area is culturally characterized by Yimeng original ecological villages and Yimeng mountain folklore, with remarkable Yimeng characteristics, bamboo landscape and farming style. It is a comprehensive tourist destination of northern Yimeng mountainous countryside with significant Yimeng characteristics, bamboo landscape and farming style, integrating vacation, leisure and sightseeing functions.

Yimeng Film & TV Base. It is located in Changshan Village, Mamuchi Township. The base consists of four parts: "The Yimeng Hung Sao Pavilion", "Ancient Mountain Village", "Ancient County Town" and "Mountain Dream Resort".
