= Zhou Ang =

2nd-century Chinese official and general

- 周昂

Inspector of Yu Province (豫州刺史)
- In office ?–?
- Monarch: Emperor Xian of Han

Administrator of Jiujiang (九江太守)
- In office ?–?
- Monarch: Emperor Xian of Han

Personal details
- Born: Unknown Shaoxing, Zhejiang
- Died: Unknown
- Relations: Zhou Yu (brother); Zhou Xin (brother)
- Occupation: Military general, politician

Zhou Ang (fl. 190s) was a Chinese military general and politician serving under the warlord Yuan Shao during the late Eastern Han dynasty of China. He was from Kuaiji Commandery, which is around present-day Shaoxing, Zhejiang. He had two brothers: Zhou Yu (Renming) and Zhou Xin. He served as the Administrator (太守) of Jiujiang Commandery (九江郡; around present-day Quanjiao County, Anhui) and as the Inspector (刺史) of Yu Province. In 192, he was defeated in a battle at Yinling County (陰陵縣; northwest of present-day Changfeng County, Anhui) against the forces of Yuan Shao's half-brother and rival Yuan Shu.

In historical records, Zhou Ang is often confused with his two brothers. For example, historical records claim that he was involved in the Battle of Yangcheng in 191 against the warlord Sun Jian (Yuan Shu's ally) when it was actually his brother Zhou Yu (Renming).

== See also ==
- Lists of people of the Three Kingdoms
