= Zhou Xin (Han dynasty) =

Chinese official and general (died 196)

- 周昕

Administrator of Danyang (丹陽太守)
- In office ?–194
- Monarch: Emperor Xian of Han
- Succeeded by: Wu Jing

Personal details
- Born: Unknown Shaoxing, Zhejiang
- Died: 196
- Relations: Zhou Yu (brother); Zhou Ang (brother)
- Occupation: Politician

Zhou Xin (died 196) was a Chinese politician of the Eastern Han dynasty of China. One of three brothers from a noted family, a scholar and an official before the collapse into civil war. He and his family would be caught up in the war between two of the leading warlords of the day and would find themselves on the wrong end of the Sun clan, Zhou Xin losing his post and then his life.

== Early Life ==
Zhou Xin was from Kuaiji Commandery, which is around present-day Shaoxing, Zhejiang. He was likely the elder of three brothers from a prominent clan, his younger siblings were Zhou Yu (Renming) and Zhou Ang. In his youth, he visited the imperial capital Luoyang and studied under the tutelage of the future Excellency Chen Fan, Zhou Xin was noted for his knowledge of divination. After he grew up, he entered government service and was appointed as the Administrator (太守) of Danyang Commandery (丹陽郡; around present-day Nanjing, Jiangsu).

== Coalition Years ==
In 189, when the warlord Cao Cao was recruiting soldiers to participate in a campaign against the warlord Dong Zhuo, who had seized control of the Han central government, Zhou Xin and his brother Zhou Yu managed to draft 2,000 soldiers with Zhou Yu joining Cao Cao. When Cao Cao suffered a major defeat to Dong Zhuo's general Xu Rong at the battle of Xingyang and was seeking soldiers, Zhou Xin helped raise 4,000 troops but these troops, taken outside their homes in Yang province, mutinied.. It is claimed overall Zhou Xin sent Cao Cao near 10,000 troops but this may have been an exaggeration. During that campaign, the Zhou clan seem to have switched their services to Cao Cao's senior ally, and head of the coalition, Yuan Shao.

In the 190s, when the warlord Yuan Shu dominated the territories in the Huai River region, Zhou Xin refused to engage him in any way because he despised Yuan Shu for his cruelty and extravagance. The Zhou family, who the historian Rafe de Crespigny suggests often fought together, were also caught up in the conflict between Yuan Shu and their boss Yuan Shao, Yuan Shu's half-brother and rival. In 192, as the anti Dong Zhuo coalition fell apart, Yuan Shao ordered the Zhou clan to attack Yuan Shu's position at Yangcheng, southeast of modern day Dengfeng. The Zhou clan were initially successful, including the killing of a visiting officer Gongsun Yue brother of the warlord Gongsun Zan, but were defeated in a battle at Yinling County (陰陵縣; northwest of present-day Changfeng County, Anhui) by Yuan Shu's general Sun Jian and were driven away from the area by Yuan Shu's forces. There is disagreement in the texts on who led the Zhou forces in that struggle, parts of Fan Ye's Book of the Later Han have Zhou Xin in command, other parts of that work, Sima Guang's Zizhi Tongjian and the Records of the Three Kingdoms by Chen Shou credits the younger brother Zhou Yu, Rafe De Crespigny supports the latter.

== Losses to Sun Clan ==
In 194 Yuan Shu sent Wu Jing, a relative of the dead Sun Jian, to lead troops to attack Zhou Xin who remained in his post at Danyang but Zhou Xin was soon forced to return home to Kuaiji. Yuan Ye's third century account claims that Wu Jing announced that everyone who followed Zhou Xin would be killed, Zhou Xin said, "Even if I were at fault, why should he drag civilians into this conflict?" He then relinquished command of his troops, disbanded his forces and returned home to Kuaiji Commandery.

In 196, Zhou Xin came into conflict with the warlord Sun Ce, son of Jian during a series of conquests in the Jiangdong region, where Kuaiji Commandery was. Wang Lang, the Administrator of Kuaiji Commandery, ordered Zhou Xin to lead troops to hold off Sun Ce after Wang Lang's soldiers failed to stop Sun Ce crossing the Hangzhou Bay. Sun Ce defeated Zhou Xin comprehensively in battle and killed him, leading Wang Lang to flee and the Hangzhou area to easily fall into Sun Ce's hands.

== In Romance of the Three Kingdoms ==
In the 14th-century novel by Luo Guanzhong, Zhou Xin appears in chapter 15 during Sun Ce's conquests as the chief officer of Wang Lang. Seeing his master duel Taishi Ci, a former fellow officer of Wang Lang, Zhou Xin tried to intervene but was met by Sun officer Huang Gai, their duel is not settled before a surprise attack on the rear of Wang Lang's troops, which leads to a devastating defeat, Zhou Xin and Wang Lang forced to fight their way back to Kuaiji. Sun Ce forces lay siege, but they decide to withdraw and attack the supply depot, hoping to lure Wang Lang's forces out. Zhou Xin (correctly) reads Sun Ce has retreated but doesn't see the danger, urging Wang Lang to strike. Zhou Xin helps lead the attack with Yan Baihu, they are ambushed by Sun Ce. While Baihu is terrified, Zhou Xin charges Sun Ce but is killed in one blow and his men surrender, on hearing the news of the defeat Wang Lang flees.

== See also ==
- Lists of people of the Three Kingdoms
