= Pingxiang County =

Pingxiang County 平乡县
- County
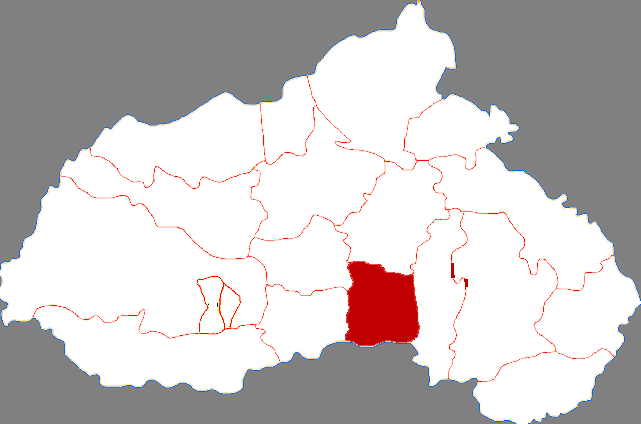
- Pingxiang in Xingtai

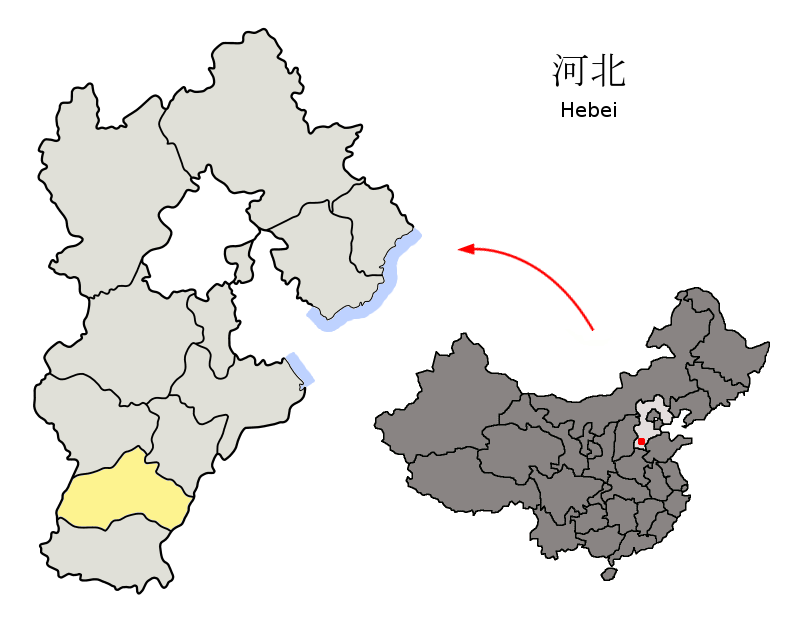
- Xingtai in Hebei
- Coordinates: 37°03′47″N 115°01′48″E
- Country: People's Republic of China
- Province: Hebei
- Prefecture-level city: Xingtai
- County seat: Fengzhou Town (丰州镇)

Area
  - Total: 406 km^{2} (157 sq mi)
- Elevation: 34 m (112 ft)

Population
  - Total: 280,000
  - Density: 690/km^{2} (1,800/sq mi)
- Time zone: UTC+8 (China Standard)
- Postal code: 054500

Pingxiang County (simplified Chinese: 平乡县; traditional Chinese: 平鄉縣; pinyin: Píngxiāng Xiàn) is a county under the administration of the prefecture-level city of Xingtai, in the south of Hebei province, China, located about 45 km (28 mi) from downtown Xingtai. It has a population of 280,000 residing in an area of 406 km^{2} (157 sq mi). In the Han dynasty, Pingxiang County was known as Julu County (钜鹿县) and was the site of the Battle of Julu in 207 BC, as well as being the birthplace of Zhang Jue and his brothers Zhang Bao and Zhang Liang, who started the Yellow Turban Rebellion in the 180s.

== Administrative divisions ==
Pingxiang consists of 3 towns and 4 townships.

Towns:

- Fengzhou (丰州镇), Hegumiao (河古庙镇), Pingxiang (平乡镇)

Townships:

- Youzhao Township (油召乡), Jiegu Township (节固乡), Tianfucun Township (田付村乡), Xunzhao Township (寻召乡)

== Climate ==
Climate data for Pingxiang, elevation 34 m (112 ft), (1991–2020 normals, extremes 1981–2010)
Month	Jan	Feb	Mar	Apr	May	Jun	Jul	Aug	Sep	Oct	Nov	Dec	Year
Record high °C (°F)	18.7 (65.7)	25.2 (77.4)	31.3 (88.3)	36.6 (97.9)	41.1 (106.0)	41.8 (107.2)	41.7 (107.1)	38.4 (101.1)	38.5 (101.3)	32.9 (91.2)	27.4 (81.3)	24.2 (75.6)	41.8 (107.2)
Mean daily maximum °C (°F)	3.6 (38.5)	8.1 (46.6)	15.1 (59.2)	22.0 (71.6)	27.8 (82.0)	32.5 (90.5)	32.4 (90.3)	30.6 (87.1)	27.2 (81.0)	21.3 (70.3)	12.3 (54.1)	5.3 (41.5)	19.9 (67.7)
Daily mean °C (°F)	−2.4 (27.7)	1.5 (34.7)	8.3 (46.9)	15.3 (59.5)	21.2 (70.2)	26.1 (79.0)	27.3 (81.1)	25.6 (78.1)	20.9 (69.6)	14.4 (57.9)	5.9 (42.6)	−0.6 (30.9)	13.6 (56.5)
Mean daily minimum °C (°F)	−7.1 (19.2)	−3.6 (25.5)	2.5 (36.5)	9.1 (48.4)	14.9 (58.8)	20.2 (68.4)	23.0 (73.4)	21.5 (70.7)	16.0 (60.8)	9.0 (48.2)	1.0 (33.8)	−4.9 (23.2)	8.5 (47.2)
Record low °C (°F)	−20.8 (−5.4)	−19.5 (−3.1)	−9.5 (14.9)	−1.8 (28.8)	3.5 (38.3)	9.2 (48.6)	15.3 (59.5)	12.9 (55.2)	5.0 (41.0)	−3.5 (25.7)	−17.6 (0.3)	−19.7 (−3.5)	−20.8 (−5.4)
Average precipitation mm (inches)	2.5 (0.10)	6.5 (0.26)	8.6 (0.34)	24.0 (0.94)	41.6 (1.64)	62.7 (2.47)	130.3 (5.13)	107.3 (4.22)	45.5 (1.79)	25.5 (1.00)	13.9 (0.55)	3.1 (0.12)	471.5 (18.56)
Average precipitation days (≥ 0.1 mm)	1.6	3.0	2.6	5.2	6.4	8.0	10.6	9.4	6.5	5.3	3.6	2.1	64.3
Average snowy days	2.3	3.0	0.9	0.2	0	0	0	0	0	0	1.0	2.4	9.8
Average relative humidity (%)	61	57	53	59	61	61	77	82	76	69	69	66	66
Mean monthly sunshine hours	150.4	157.2	210.1	231.0	264.9	233.4	200.3	201.5	187.6	184.3	151.6	146.7	2,319
Percentage possible sunshine	49	51	56	58	60	53	45	49	51	54	50	49	52
Source: China Meteorological Administration
