= Warriors Orochi 4 =

2018 video game

- Developer: Omega Force
- Publisher: Koei Tecmo
- Director: Shigeto Nakadai
- Producer: Akihiro Suzuki
- Series: Warriors Orochi
- Platforms: Microsoft Windows; Nintendo Switch; PlayStation 4; Xbox One
- Release: Switch, PS4: JP: September 27, 2018; NA: October 16, 2018; EU: October 19, 2018; Windows, Xbox One: NA: October 16, 2018; EU: October 19, 2018; Ultimate; Switch, PS4: JP: December 19, 2019; NA/EU: February 14, 2020; Windows, Xbox One: NA/EU: February 14, 2020
- Genre: Hack and slash
- Modes: Single-player, multiplayer

Warriors Orochi 4, released as Musou Orochi 3 (無双OROCHI 3, Musō Orochi Surī) in Japan, is a 2018 hack and slash video game developed by Koei Tecmo and Omega Force for Microsoft Windows, PlayStation 4, Xbox One and Nintendo Switch. It is the fifth and final installment of the crossover series Warriors Orochi, a combination of the Dynasty Warriors and Samurai Warriors series. The game was released in Japan on September 27, 2018, and in North America and Europe in October.

An updated version, titled Warriors Orochi 4 Ultimate (known in Japan as Musou Orochi 3 Ultimate (無双OROCHI 3, Musō Orochi Surī Arutimeito), was released in Japan on December 19, 2019, and was released in North America and Europe on February 14, 2020.

== Gameplay ==
As with the previous iterations, the player is given control of a three-man team consisting of characters from the Dynasty Warriors and Samurai Warriors series. Each character has a class type that determines their ability: Power, Speed, and Technique; the Wonder type introduced in Warriors Orochi 3 has been removed. New to the series is the concept of magic and Sacred Treasures, techniques that allow characters to perform special feats to overcome enemies. These depend on a specific category that is separate from the class system, and are performed by holding down the right shoulder button and pressing either the normal, charge, or musou attack buttons, the latter two requiring a special magic gauge, and the last also requiring half of a player's musou gauge. As such, these replace the type actions from the previous games. Because of this, characters from the Dynasty Warriors series lack their second musou attack, but retain the ability to perform an aerial musou attack, and characters from the Samurai Warriors series lack their special attacks, but retain the ability to perform hyper attacks. The ability to mount a horse remains in Warriors Orochi 4, and is performed by holding down the right shoulder button and pressing the jump button.

The Awakening mechanic from Dynasty Warriors 8 and Musou Gokui mechanic from Samurai Warriors 4 are unified in Warriors Orochi 4, and may only be activated by obtaining a rare powerup during gameplay and pressing the left analog stick; when playing with only a single Joy-Con on the Nintendo Switch, this is instead activated by pressing both SL and SR, as the left analog stick alone is normally mapped to the character switch functionality. Only one character from a team may use this at a given time, though the character activating it need not be the character that obtained the powerup, and players may still switch characters while the mode is active. Once activated, the character may perform their Rage attack, consistent with both Dynasty Warriors 8 and Samurai Warriors 4. Characters central to the story are, once the relevant portions of the story are cleared, given a "deification" form based on figures from Greek or Norse mythology, which will be in effect while Awakening or Musou Gokui is in effect, strengthening their various other actions in the process.

As with previous games, most stages in Warriors Orochi 4 are taken from either earlier installments of the Warriors Orochi series, or the Dynasty Warriors and Samurai Warriors source games, with a minimal amount of original stages, reskinned to suit the theme of Warriors Orochi 4. New to this game are mashup stages where one part of a stage is taken from Dynasty Warriors and another part is taken from Samurai Warriors; for example, the Baidi Castle stage from Dynasty Warriors 8 has the upper portion taken from the Oshi Castle stage from Samurai Warriors 4.

The game features several multiplayer options, including a three-versus-three competitive multiplayer mode.

== Plot ==
Following the events of Warriors Orochi 3, the heroes of the Three Kingdoms and Sengoku period return to their time, having forgotten all their exploits in the dimensional world. Meanwhile, Zeus, the king of Olympus, decides to bring them back for an unclear purpose. His son, Perseus, weary of Zeus' constant meddling of mortal affairs, decides to steal his eight Ouroboros bracelets, made from the hair of Medusa and containing a godly power, and contact the mortals, only to end up causing them to be scattered across the world.

Subsequently, the heroes are divided into four factions, each with a bracelet wielder. Perseus leads the first one, which includes Naotora Ii, Guan Yinping, and Yukimura Sanada, each controlling the power of Aphrodite, Freya, and Tyr, respectively. The second is led by the Mystic Nuwa and includes Nobunaga Oda, who controls the power of Izanagi. The third is led by Zeus' children, Ares and Athena, and includes Zhao Yun, Mitsunari Ishida, and Cao Pi, each controlling the power of Apollo, Hermes, and Poseidon, respectively. The final faction includes Da Ji and Lu Bu, who wields the power of Thor. The first two factions link up, as Nobunaga and Nuwa had only wanted to test the mantle of their adversary. Yukimura forms a bond with Perseus, while Ares is revealed to have earned the loyalty of Cao Pi and Hideyoshi Toyotomi, whom he mistakenly thinks is a bracelet wielder, by promising them worldly power, but they realize that he has no intention of keeping it.

Perseus eventually unmasks himself as Loki, a servant of Odin, the king of Asgard, who secretly leads Da Ji's faction. He deliberately scattered the bracelets so the heroes could channel their godly power, therefore stabilizing the world enough for Odin to enact his plan: summoning the God of Destruction, the world's will taking the form of Orochi, so he can grow Yggdrasil and create a weapon powerful enough to destroy the universe and start it with a clean slate. Odin offers Ares, frustrated by Zeus' inaction, a chance to depose his father. When the heroes finally defeat Zeus, who admits that he only wanted to spar with them, Ares snaps and kills him, absorbing his power and declaring himself the new king of Olympus.

A distraught Athena joins the heroes to prevent Odin from completing his plan. After a series of battles, Odin becomes impatient of Ares' failure to contain the coalition and steals Zeus' power from him. To atone for his actions, Ares chooses to sacrifice a part of his life force to resurrect his father. Meanwhile, the God of Destruction's arrival unexpectedly resurrects the real Orochi, who assists the heroes to kill him before being killed himself. The heroes, however, are too late to stop Odin from growing Yggdrasil. At the last minute, Loki turns on Odin and causes Yggdrasil to weaken, having had a change of heart and wanting to avenge his fallen friends, who were killed by Odin during Ragnarok. An enraged Odin kills Loki, only to perish at the hands of the heroes.

The victory is short-lived, however, as the toll of Orochi's and the God of Destruction's deaths have split apart the balance of the world. The Olympians and the Mystics band together to send the heroes back to their time. The heroes once again lose the memories of their exploits, though they retain a sense that there are beings watching them from above.

=== Ultimate ===
The new story in Ultimate follows an alternate timeline which diverges from the original game's story The Traitorous God from Chapter 5, shortly after obtaining Zeus' weapon (and before the confrontation between the God of Destruction and Orochi). There are three new chapters: Chapter 6, Chapter 7, and the Final Chapter, the latter two having separate endings.

In Chapter 6, Loki abandons Odin's cause earlier and reunites with Yukimura. They meet Gaia, the Earth's personification, who appears as a disembodied voice. It is revealed that Loki and Gaia were working together with the real Perseus to deceive Odin, but Loki had to kill Perseus to gain Odin's trust. Recalling the Earth's memories, Gaia learns that Odin's soul is tied to Yggdrasil, so they have to return it back to the tree if they want to stop Odin for good. Throughout the campaign, Loki admits that Perseus' soul was shattered when he killed him, giving Gaia an idea to gather them all so they may be able to resurrect him.

In Chapter 7, alongside the two, the heroes are joined by Hades, ruler of the underworld. Hades explains that he was the person responsible for saving Odin's soul after Ragnarok. During the fight against the God of Destruction, Zeus and Hades channel his power to Gaia, giving her a new body. Eventually, Hades regains Odin's soul and returns it back to the tree, enabling the heroes to kill Odin before the gods send the heroes back to their world.

Meanwhile, the Final Chapter is unlocked by gathering all fragments of Perseus' soul scattered in previous battles. The chapter begins right before the final battle with Odin in Chapter 7. A resurrected Perseus tells the heroes that Hades is the mastermind behind Odin's plan to create Yggdrasil: Hades had sent Odin to work towards Yggdrasil so he could snatch it and empower himself, giving him the means to depose Zeus as king of Olympus. Gaia and Kaguya work together to send the heroes back in time and save Odin from Hades. Through the former, they learn that to stop Hades, they will have to release Odin's soul from Yggdrasil. The heroes travel to the underworld to retrieve the Bident, a weapon capable of severing a soul from the tree. During the final confrontation, Hades taunts Odin that he has foreseen the latter's death, which will happen only if he regains his soul. Despite this, Odin retakes his soul anyway, enabling the others to defeat Hades and forcing him back to the underworld. While the others leave Yggdrasil as it begins collapsing, Odin chooses to remain behind, promising Loki that he will survive somehow. The battle with Hades done, Loki, the Olympians, and the Mystics bid the heroes farewell before returning them back to their world.

== Characters ==
The original game features 170 playable characters. With the exception of the collaboration characters from other franchises, all playable characters from Warriors Orochi 3 Ultimate return. Characters are based on their appearances from Dynasty Warriors 8: Empires and Samurai Warriors 4-II; as a consequence, the game also marks the debut of characters introduced in those games into the Warriors Orochi series. The game introduces six new original characters:

- Zeus (Power): The Greek god of the sky and thunder, he takes an interest in Orochi's dimensional world and brings the heroes back to realize his ambitions. Zeus wields a scepter, Keraunos, as his weapon. His voice actor is Takashi Matsuyama.
- Athena (Technique): The Greek goddess of wisdom and Zeus' daughter. Loyal to her father, she escorts him in the dimensional world while they are searching for a traitor of their kind. Athena wields a mechanical shield, Aegis, as her weapon. Her voice actress is Suzuko Mimori.
- Loki (Technique): The Norse god of mischief and shapeshifting. Throughout the game, he disguises himself as Perseus, a Greek hero, intending to mislead the warriors into helping Odin; as such, he is solely referred to as Perseus in all promotional material. He is the person Athena is looking for in the dimensional world. Loki wields a tree spear, Mistilteinn, as his weapon. His voice actor is Hiro Shimono.
- Ares (Speed): The Greek god of war and Zeus' son. Prideful and arrogant, he loathes humans and detests his father's tendency to live among them. He wields Typhon spears as his weapon. His voice actor is Makoto Furukawa.
- Odin (Power): The Norse god of wisdom and magic. Following his survival at Ragnarok, Odin is eager to search for and accumulate power. He wields Gungnir as his weapon. His voice actor is Sohta Arai.
- Diamondback (Power): A general in Orochi's army, he is the series' third playable generic officer, after Dodomeki and Gyuki. He wields Orochi's scythe as his weapon. His voice actor is Kohei Fukuhara.

The Ultimate update sees the return of guests, including veterans Joan of Arc from Bladestorm: The Hundred Years War, Ryu Hayabusa from the Ninja Gaiden/Dead or Alive series, and Achilles from Warriors: Legends of Troy, and also adds new characters for a total of 177 playable characters:

- Gaia (Technique): The Greek personification of the Earth and Zeus' grandmother, she wields Hecatoncheires as her weapon. Her voice actress is Saori Hayami.
- Hades (Power): The Greek god of death and Zeus' brother, he wields a scythe as his weapon. His voice actor is Tomokazu Seki.
- Yang Jian (Speed): A Chinese mystic, he wields a three-pointed double-edged glaive as his weapon. His voice actor is Daisuke Matsubara.
- Perseus (Power): A demigod son of Zeus and Greek hero, he was the figure whom Loki impersonated in the original game. Like Loki, he wields the tree spear, Mistilteinn, as his weapon and shares his voice actor, Hiro Shimono.

All remaining characters are voiced by their voice actors from their last playable appearance, with the exception of Ujiyasu Hōjō, who is now voiced by Masashi Ebara after the passing of previous voice actor Unsho Ishizuka.

Hundun, who is not part of the main story, is unlockable through "Pandemonium" difficulty. The selected team will be unable to heal its health and magic while going through one of the random levels and completing the level without dying, in order to unlock that character.

Wei	Wu	Shu	Jin	Other	Orochi 1 & 2	Orochi 3	Orochi 4	Samurai 1	Samurai 2	Samurai 3	Samurai 4
Cai Wenji	Daqiao	Bao Sanniang	Deng Ai	Chen Gong*	Da Ji	Benkei	Achilles**	Goemon Ishikawa	Ginchiyo Tachibana	Aya	Hisahide Matsunaga*
Cao Cao	Ding Feng	Fa Zheng*	Guo Huai	Diaochan	Fu Xi	Diamondback*	Ares*	Hanzō Hattori	Gracia	Hanbei Takenaka	Kagekatsu Uesugi*
Cao Pi	Gan Ning	Guan Ping	Jia Chong*	Dong Zhuo	Himiko	Dodomeki	Athena*	Hideyoshi Toyotomi	Ieyasu Tokugawa	Kai	Kojurō Katakura*
Cao Ren	Han Dang*	Guan Suo	Sima Shi	Lu Bu	Kiyomori Taira	Gyūki	Gaia**	Ina	Kanetsugu Naoe	Kanbei Kuroda	Koshōshō*
Dian Wei	Huang Gai	Guan Xing*	Sima Yi	Lu Lingqi*	Nuwa	Hundun	Hades**	Keiji Maeda	Katsuie Shibata	Kiyomasa Katō	Lady Hayakawa*
Guo Jia	Lianshi	Guan Yinping*	Sima Zhao	Meng Huo	Orochi	Kaguya	Joan of Arc**	Kenshin Uesugi	Kojirō Sasaki	Masanori Fukushima	Munenori Yagyū*
Jia Xu	Ling Tong	Guan Yu	Wang Yuanji	Yuan Shao	Orochi X	Kyūbi	Loki*	Kunoichi	Kotarō Fūma	Motonari Mōri	**Naomasa Ii***
Li Dian*	Lu Meng	Huang Zhong	Wen Yang*	Zhang Jiao	Sun Wukong	Nezha	Odin*	Magoichi Saika	Mitsunari Ishida	Muneshige Tachibana	**Naotora Ii***
Pang De	Lu Su*	Jiang Wei	Xiahou Ba	Zhurong	Taigong Wang	Nezha (Human)	Perseus**	Masamune Date	Motochika Chōsokabe	Ujiyasu Hōjō	Nobuyuki Sanada*
Wang Yi	Lu Xun	Liu Bei	Zhang Chunhua*	Zuo Ci	Yoshitsune Minamoto	Sanzang	Ryu Hayabusa**	Mitsuhide Akechi	Musashi Miyamoto		Takakage Kobayakawa*
Xiahou Dun	Sun Ce	Liu Shan	Zhong Hui			Seimei Abe	Yang Jian**	Nobunaga Oda	Nagamasa Azai		Takatora Tōdō*
Xiahou Yuan	Sun Jian	Ma Chao	Zhuge Dan			Shennong	Zeus*	Nō	Nene		Toyohisa Shimazu*
Xu Huang	Sun Quan	Ma Dai				Shuten Dōji		Oichi	Sakon Shima		Yoshitsugu Ōtani*
Xu Zhu	Sun Shangxiang	Pang Tong				Susanoo		Okuni	Toshiie Maeda		
Xun Yu*	Taishi Ci	Wei Yan				Tamamo		Ranmaru Mori	Yoshihiro Shimazu		
Yu Jin*	Xiaoqiao	Xingcai				Yinglong		Shingen Takeda			
Yue Jin*	Zhou Tai	Xu Shu						**Tadakatsu Honda**			
Zhang He	Zhou Yu	Yueying						Yoshimoto Imagawa			
Zhang Liao	Zhu Ran*	Zhang Bao*						Yukimura Sanada			
Zhenji		Zhang Fei									
		Zhao Yun									
		Zhuge Liang									

- Asterisk (*) denotes new characters added in the original game.
- Double asterisk (**) denotes characters added in the Ultimate version.
- **Bold** denotes default characters. Additionally, players who pre-ordered the game also have Tamamo (Nintendo Switch), Kyubi (PlayStation 4), or Yinglong (Xbox One X) unlocked from the start of the game, in addition to those denoted.

== Music ==
The ending theme song of this game is "Kakumei No Masquerade Musou OROCHI ver." (革命のマスカレード 無双 OROCHI ver.; lit. Revolutionary Masquerade Warriors Orochi ver.") by Suzuko Mimori, who voiced Umi Sonoda from Love Live! School Idol Project series, a re-arranged version of a track from her fourth studio album Tone, made specifically for this game. The Ultimate version has a music as well named "Statice" by Saori Hayami, who previously voiced Miyuki Shiba from The Irregular at Magic High School, Shirayuki from Snow White with the Red Hair, Himawari Uzumaki from Boruto: Naruto Next Generations and others.

== Reception ==
Reception

Aggregate score
Aggregator	Score
Metacritic	NS: 60/100; PC: 77/100; PS4: 72/100; XONE: 68/100; NS (Ultimate): 70/100; PS4 (Ultimate): 70/100

Review scores
Publication	Score
Famitsu	35/40; 34/40 (Ultimate)
Nintendo Life	6/10
Nintendo World Report	6/10
Push Square	7/10

The PlayStation 4 and Switch ports of the game sold 124,836 and 30,682 physical retail copies, respectively, within their first two weeks of release in Japan. For Ultimate, the Switch port sold 9,928 copies within its first four days of release, while the PS4 port sold 25,768 copies within its first eleven days of release.

The game received a score of 35 out of 40 from the Japanese gaming magazine Famitsu.
