= Dynasty Warriors 8 =

2013 video game

- Developer: Omega Force
- Publisher: Tecmo Koei
- Director: Atsushi Miyauchi
- Producer: Akihiro Suzuki
- Composers: Masato Koike; Sasaki Masayoshi; Masako Otsuka; Yasuhiro Misawa; Kenji Nakajo
- Series: Dynasty Warriors
- Platform: PlayStation 3 Xbox 360: Xtreme Legends PlayStation 3 PlayStation 4 PlayStation Vita Windows Nintendo Switch Empires PlayStation 3 PlayStation 4 Xbox One Windows PlayStation Vita Nintendo Switch
- Release: February 28, 2013: PlayStation 3; JP: February 28, 2013; NA: July 16, 2013; EU: July 19, 2013; AU: July 25, 2013 Xbox 360; NA: July 16, 2013; EU: July 19, 2013; AU: July 25, 2013 Xtreme Legends PlayStation 3; JP: November 28, 2013; NA: March 25, 2014; EU: April 4, 2014 PlayStation 4; JP: February 22, 2014; NA: March 25, 2014; EU: April 4, 2014 Windows; JP: May 23, 2014; NA: May 13, 2014; EU: May 13, 2014; AU: May 13, 2014 Switch; WW: December 27, 2018 Empires PS3, PS4, Xbox One; JP: November 20, 2014; NA: February 24, 2015; EU: February 27, 2015 Windows; JP: February 27, 2015; NA: February 27, 2015; EU: February 27, 2015 PlayStation Vita; JP: November 26, 2015; NA: November 24, 2015; EU: November 25, 2015 Switch; JP: November 9, 2017
- Genre: Hack and slash
- Modes: Single-player, multiplayer

Dynasty Warriors 8 (真・三國無双7, Shin Sangoku Musō 7; known in Japan as Shin Sangoku Musou 7) is a 2013 hack and slash game developed by Omega Force and published by Tecmo Koei for the PlayStation 3 and Xbox 360. It is the eighth installment of the Dynasty Warriors series. Having more than 82 characters featured in the game, the game largely based its system on Dynasty Warriors 7 and focused on adding more content for replayability while also making several tweaks to the combat system.

The game was unveiled on October 30, 2012 via Jump Magazine and released on February 28, 2013 for the PlayStation 3 in Japan. On April 3, 2013, it was confirmed by Tecmo Koei that there would be an overseas release for both North America and Europe in July 2013. It was released on both PlayStation 3 and Xbox 360 for both physical and digital release. The option of English and Japanese voice overs also return, where there is also an option to change the subtitles to English, French or German.

The game is followed by two expansions. The first, Dynasty Warriors 8: Xtreme Legends, was released for PlayStation 3 in 2013 in Japan and in 2014 in North America and Europe. The second expansion, Dynasty Warriors 8: Empires, was released for the PlayStation 3, PlayStation 4 and Xbox One on in 2014 in Japan and in 2015 in North America and Europe. The PlayStation Vita and Microsoft Windows versions were released in 2015 in Japan, North America and Europe. A Japan-exclusive Switch port of Empires was released in 2017. All three ports have a bundle set with Dynasty Warriors 8 which is called Dynasty Warriors 8: Xtreme Legends Complete Edition overseas and Shin Sangoku Musou 7 with Moushouden in Asia.

== Gameplay and features ==
=== Story mode and free mode ===
The story mode retains the same faction-based storyline and returns with seamless cutscenes. In addition, each of the characters of the "Other" faction has one scenario dedicated to them, forming a loose "Other" faction story mode, in a first for the series. Stages now have more freedom of progression for the player, unlike the previous installment, which was strongly preset in means of stage routes. A selection of up to four characters will be offered for each stages in story mode, instead of controlling a pre-defined character; the mission objectives in each level differ based on the character chosen. The story has been entirely rewritten, with each of the four factions' stories dividing into a historical path and a hypothetical path at a critical portion of their stories. Each mission may have a number of optional objectives which unlock additional side story missions or alter the course of history, such as the moment where the flood attack in Fan Castle fails and therefore saves Guan Yu's life and in relation also saves Zhang Fei from the betraying officers. In order to unlock the hypothetical path, players must complete all of the optional objectives in both the main and side stories prior to the critical point of the storyline. The game also allows a co-op play of the story mode and it can be played both offline and online. However, online co-op is only available on the PlayStation 3 and Xbox 360. The Windows version does not have online multiplayer. In the previous installment to the franchise, Dynasty Warriors 7, the story mode was only single-player.

Xtreme Legends adds an additional storyline for Lu Bu's forces, primarily focused on Lu Bu, Chen Gong, and Zhang Liao. In addition, a series of hypothetical missions are added to the four main kingdoms' storylines, mostly recreating historical events with a slight hypothetical twist (for example, one Wei mission is premised on Cao Cao sparing Lu Bu after the Battle of Xiapi and utilizing him in the Battle of Guandu, while a Shu scenario has Liu Bei turning to Sun Ce rather than Cao Cao after the Battle of Xiaopei). Each of the three main kingdoms contains a two-part "mini-campaign" centered around the new character introduced to their respective factions (Yu Jin, Fa Zheng, and Zhu Ran), while the Jin faction, having no new characters, has a three-part mini-campaign featuring a fictional version of Zhong Hui's Rebellion. Each campaign concludes with a whimsical side-story mission, not set to any particular timeline. Additional "Other" scenarios are also included for the Other faction.

The music for the hypothetical portion of each Story Mode is taken from earlier Dynasty Warriors installments, with four pieces specifically remixed for this game (one each from Dynasty Warriors 3, 5, 6, and 7, as well with original). Furthermore, the four kingdom leitmotifs introduced in Dynasty Warriors 7 return and are further expanded upon in the soundtrack of Dynasty Warriors 8; Xtreme Legends adds a kingdom leitmotif for Lü Bu's faction based on his recurring theme.

Free mode returns for the first time since Dynasty Warriors 6 in terms of main game. Players will be given opportunity to play as an opposing faction in the stages a la Dynasty Warriors 3 and 4, instead of being forced to play in a faction as in Dynasty Warriors 7: Xtreme Legends.

=== Ambition Mode ===
A new game mode, called the "Ambition Mode", has been introduced. In it, the player is tasked to create a social base for peasants called the "Tongquetai Tower" and to make Emperor Xian visit it. To raise the tower's status, the player must take part in three different kind of battles; Skirmish battles which give materials to construct the tower, Raid battles which increase fame, and Large-scale battles which can recruit new partners. Players start out with the weapon shop as their sole base facility. More can be added or expanded upon as the town gradually becomes populated with people. These include a food market, a trade shop, a menagerie, etc.

Xtreme Legends introduces a countdown timer into Ambition Mode, where a player is initially given 7 minutes of time (the base game granted 15, 30, or 60 minutes per scenario, based on the game map), and is granted additional time for every 100 enemies killed, for every officer defeated, or for achieving stage objectives (up to a maximum of 15 minutes). It also introduces a second portion to Ambition Mode, reminiscent of both Dynasty Warriors Next and the Empires installments, where, following the construction of the Tonquetai and the visitation of the emperor, a false emperor has arisen and the player is tasked to eliminate the false emperor by subjugating territories under the false emperor's influence. The bodyguard system of the base game is expanded, where, instead of the ability to bring one (playable) character with them to battle, they may bring three (generic or playable) officers with them. The ability to select bodyguards is based on a "fee" system, constrained by the playable character's leadership rating as well as an inherent cost to hiring the character as a bodyguard (for example, playable characters cost more than generic officers). Each bodyguard is also associated with a particular bodyguard skill, which may be used by the playable character to affect the course of gameplay. Bodyguard skills may be upgraded with use, or by releasing other officers (the released officers return as enemies, and may be re-recruited), while the leadership rating of playable characters may be upgraded by using the skills of their bodyguards.

=== Challenge Mode ===
As with previous Dynasty Warriors games, Xtreme Legends adds a Challenge Mode, which uses stock characters (as opposed to the customized characters in Story, Free, or Ambition modes) for various arcade-style challenges. There are a total of five mini-games, each of which reward the player with a customizable weapon based on the character's score in the challenge; these may include weapons with weapon elements that are unobtainable in any of the other modes.

=== New mechanics ===
The game features new battle mechanics that rely on a new concept called the "Three-Point System", where each weapon is given an affinity of either "Heaven", "Earth", or "Man"; each affinity is strong against one of the affinities and weak against the other. If the player faces an officer whose affinity is weaker, they may trigger the "Storm Rush", a multi hitting attack that requires repeatedly pressing the attack buttons. It is shown through a blue gauge above the opponent which decreases as you attack. Storm Rush is then initiated automatically when the gauge is fully depleted; in Xtreme Legends, this can be configured to be triggered manually by pressing both the normal and charge attack buttons. Conversely, if the player faces an officer whose affinity is stronger, they may trigger the "Switch Counter", a counterblow attack that allows you to avoid a hard hitting attack from an opponent while also blowing them away before switching to another weapon. It is shown through a red exclamation mark. A switch counter may be triggered by pressing the weapon switch attack button when the opponent is preparing a charge attack or a Storm Rush; a visual indicator will appear when the opportunity to Switch Counter arises.

Dynasty Warriors 8 also adds Rage Mode; this mechanic is similar to the Musou Rage system from Dynasty Warriors 5. This requires the Rage Gauge to be full, which may be achieved by attacking enemies. When it is full, it can be initiated (with R3 on the PS3 and PS4, and by touching the screen where the Rage Gauge lies on the PS Vita) where the player's stats dramatically increase while the gauge slowly depletes. While in Rage Mode, the player's Musou bars merged, and is automatically replenished; when the player presses the Musou attack button, the player is able to perform a Rage Attack, a powerful move reminiscent of Musou attacks from past Dynasty Warriors games, in that it will slowly deplete a character's Musou gauge, and ends whenever the player releases the Musou attack button or the gauge is empty (the Rage Gauge may be depleted while a player is performing the Rage Attack; Rage Mode will end in this case when the Rage Attack ends).

In the previous installment, each character could hold up to two musou attacks; either two ground attacks (termed "Musou 1" and "Musou 2"; the latter triggered by pressing the Musou and weapon switch attack buttons at the same time), or one ground and one air attack. In this installment, all characters have all three types of Musou attacks, though the ability to use the aerial Musou and Musou 2 attacks must be unlocked through strengthening the character.

=== Weapon updates ===
The game retains the EX weapon system from Dynasty Warriors 7, where each character's six normal and charge attacks are determined entirely by the two weapons that they have equipped; in addition, each character is associated with a single weapon, for which a special EX attack (a character-specific followup to a charge attack) is available to them; in Xtreme Legends each character gains a second EX attack. Each character may equip two weapons, and may freely switch them in battle by pressing the weapon switch button; a character may perform their Musou attack regardless of which weapon is equipped. Unlike Dynasty Warriors 7, characters no longer share EX weapon types; each character is now associated with a unique EX weapon type. Examples include Sun Jian featuring a new nine-ringed blade. This is a dao that has a total of nine rings that connect to the sword's back. The rings are able to produce sound that inflicts damage upon enemies. All weapons from Dynasty Warriors 7 and its expansions return, with many new ones added. Unlike Dynasty Warriors 7, players may keep multiple copies of a single weapon type, each of which containing six "element" slots. Weapons broadly fall into two categories in terms of customization: standard weapons and "treasure weapons". Whereas treasure weapons have preset elements and cannot be customized, players may customize standard weapons through one of three methods (all inspired by the Warriors Orochi series): weapon tempering, reforging, and, in Xtreme Legends, fusion. Weapon tempering and reforging require the use of "weapon materials", which may be obtained through Ambition Mode play; tempering sacrifices a weapon to strengthen another one while reforging trades three weapons for two stronger ones. Weapon Fusion requires the use of Gems, acquired through Free and Ambition modes, where players may selectively replace an existing element on a weapon with elements found on another weapon (which will be sacrificed in the process), change the affinity of an existing weapon, or improve the base attack rating of a weapon. The process of weapon customization must be unlocked through Ambition Mode, though in Xtreme Legends once unlocked it may also be used in Free Mode.

A weapon's type now includes an affinity, being one of the following three elements: 天 Heaven, 地 Earth, 人 Man. With these three affinity elements, a triangular relationship connecting the three in an infinite manner determines which affinity will outdo one another. This triangular relationship is similar to Rock-paper-scissors. The relationship states that the "Man" affinity is effective against the "Heaven" affinity, the "Heaven" affinity is effective against the "Earth" affinity, and the "Earth" affinity is effective against the "Man" affinity.

== Other features ==
Dynasty Warriors 8 features upgraded graphics compared to previous games in the series, with less lag and fewer framerate issues. The weather effects on the stages have been improved and there are more gimmicks implemented in the system, adding a more distinctive playstyle.

The morale gauge also returns. Horses are now called by pressing L2 where if held down, players can automatically mount their horse. Clothing will also be dirtied throughout the course of battle.

== Characters ==
The following is a list of the 83 playable characters in the game. Characters available by default are the ones who are selectable in the first stage of each kingdom stories; other characters are unlocked by unlocking the first stage they are made playable in Story Mode. Players who import saved data from the base game to Xtreme Legends will have the new characters unlocked for use in Story Mode and Free Mode by default, in addition to the characters that were previously unlocked in the base game. In Xtreme Legends, if the character is defeated as an ally in Ambition Mode or if they are released to strengthen another officer, they will be unavailable until they are defeated and recruited again.

Wei	Wu	Shu	Jin	Other
Cai Wenji	Daqiao	Bao Sanniang	Deng Ai	Chen Gong**
**Cao Cao**	Ding Feng	Fa Zheng**	Guo Huai	Diaochan
Cao Pi	Gan Ning	Guan Ping	Jia Chong*	Dong Zhuo
Cao Ren	**Han Dang***	Guan Suo	**Sima Shi**	Lu Bu
Dian Wei	Huang Gai	Guan Xing*	**Sima Yi**	Lu Lingqi**
Guo Jia	Lianshi	Guan Yinping*	**Sima Zhao**	Meng Huo
Jia Xu	Ling Tong	**Guan Yu**	Wang Yuanji	Yuan Shao
Li Dian*	Lu Meng	Huang Zhong	Wen Yang*	Zhang Jiao
Pang De	Lu Su*	Jiang Wei	Xiahou Ba	Zhurong
Wang Yi	Lu Xun	**Liu Bei**	**Zhang Chunhua***	Zuo Ci
**Xiahou Dun**	**Sun Ce**	Liu Shan	Zhong Hui	
**Xiahou Yuan**	Sun Jian	Ma Chao	Zhuge Dan	
Xu Huang	**Sun Quan**	Ma Dai		
Xu Zhu	**Sun Shangxiang**	Pang Tong		
Xun Yu***	Taishi Ci	Wei Yan		
Yu Jin**	Xiaoqiao	Xingcai		
Yue Jin*	Zhou Tai	Xu Shu		
Zhang He	Zhou Yu	Yueying		
Zhang Liao	Zhu Ran**	Zhang Bao*		
Zhenji		**Zhang Fei**		
		Zhao Yun		
		Zhuge Liang		

* Denotes new characters to the series
** Denotes characters added through Dynasty Warriors 8: Xtreme Legends
*** Denotes characters added through Dynasty Warriors 8: Empires
Bold denotes default characters (Dynasty Warriors 8 only)

== Reception ==
Reception

Aggregate score
Aggregator	Score
Metacritic	PS3: 68/100; X360: 65/100; PS4: 69/100; VITA: 65/100; PC: 71/100; XONE: 58/100; VITA (Empires): 70/100; NS: 83/100

Review scores
Publication	Score
Destructoid	9/10
Eurogamer	7/10
Famitsu	36/40; 37/40 (Xtreme Legends); 33/40 (Empires)
Game Informer	6/10
IGN	8.7/10

The game has received mostly positive reviews.

Among the Famitsu 2013 Top 100, a listing of the top 100 Japanese retail software sales for the year of 2013 from data collected by Famitsu's parent company Enterbrain, Dynasty Warriors 8 ranked number 19, with 354,980 physical retail sales within Japan.

== Related games ==
Like previous games in the series, Dynasty Warriors 8 is followed by two expansions. The first, Dynasty Warriors 8: Xtreme Legends (真・三國無双7 猛将伝, Shin Sangokumusō 7 Mōshōden) was released for PlayStation 3 and PlayStation Vita on November 28, 2013 in Japan while the PlayStation 4 version was released as a launch title in Japan. Both versions were released on March 25, 2014 in North America and Europe on April 4, 2014. A PC port was also released on May 23, 2014 in Japan as well as May 13, 2014 in North America and Europe, with a Nintendo Switch port following on December 27, 2018 in Japan. It includes additional features not present in Dynasty Warriors 8, such as a new story mode dedicated to Lu Bu and his allies, new stages for the rest of the kingdoms and other characters, new content for Ambition Mode, Challenge Mode, a new EX attack for each character, and five new playable characters: Chen Gong, Fa Zheng, Lu Lingqi, Yu Jin, and Zhu Ran. It also enables cross-platform multiplayer. Players may also have the option to buy just the expansion or a package with the original version (called Dynasty Warriors 8: Xtreme Legends - Complete Edition for the PS4, also called Dynasty Warriors 8 Portable for the PlayStation Vita) through either physical discs or digital download.

The second expansion, Dynasty Warriors 8: Empires (真・三國無双7 Empires, Shin Sangokumusō 7 Empires) was released for the PlayStation 3, PlayStation 4, and Xbox One on November 20, 2014 in Japan and it was released in February 2015 in North America and Europe. An additional PlayStation Vita port, which includes all previously released DLC, was released in November 2015; the same version was also released for the Nintendo Switch on November 9, 2017 to commemorate Omega Force's 20th anniversary. Like previous Empires expansions, it focuses more on strategical and tactical battle system. It allows players to modify the player force's flags, horses, and soldiers, as well as featuring large-scale strategems, enhanced from Dynasty Warriors 7: Empires. In addition to the marriage system, players' officers can have children with their spouses. A new playable character, Xun Yu was also added in Empires.

The visuals of the game's playable characters are used in the spin-off game, Dynasty Warriors Blast (真・三國無双 ブラスト, Shin Sangokumusō Burasuto), a free-to-play card-based social game for the mobile phones released on July 31, 2014. Like the 100man-nin social game of sister series Samurai Warriors, the game has a large amount of original character designs in addition to the playable characters of the main Dynasty Warriors series, some of whom may be implemented to the main series according to producer Suzuki.

== See also ==
- Samurai Warriors
- Koei Tecmo
- Romance of the Three Kingdoms
- Romance of the Three Kingdoms (video game series)
- Three Kingdoms
- Warriors Orochi
