= Muli =

Muli may refer to:

== Places ==
- Muli Tibetan Autonomous County, Sichuan, China
- Muli River, Sichuan, China
- Múli, a village on the island of Borðoy, in the Faroe Islands
- Muli State, a former princely state in India
- Muli, Gujarat, a city and municipality in the state of Gujarat, India
- Muli Strait, Indonesia
- Muli, Kermanshah, a village in Iran
- Muli, Khuzestan, a village in Iran
- Muli (Meemu Atoll), the capital of Meemu Atoll, Maldives

== Other uses ==
- Muli (given name), a list of people with the name
- Mullo (vampire), a creature from Roma (Gypsy) mythology
- Muli station, a metro station in Suzhou, China
- Daikon, also known as mooli (romanized as mūlī), a winter radish
- Muli (TV series), a Malaysian-Filipino television series
