= Mulu =

Mulu may refer to:

- Mulu (band), a 1990s British trip hop group
- Mulu (company), a social sharing website
- Mulu (state constituency), represented in the Sarawak State Legislative Assembly
- Mulu, Ethiopia
- Mulu, Kermanshah, Iran
- Mulu, Maragheh, East Azerbaijan Province, Iran
- Mulu Airport, an airport in northern Sarawak, Malaysia
- Mount Mulu, a mountain in Sarawak, Malaysia

== People ==
- King Mulu (184–263 CE), legendary ruler in Yunnan, China
- Mulú (formerly Omulu), Brazilian DJ and music producer

== See also ==
- Gunung Mulu National Park, a UNESCO World Heritage Site in northern Sarawak, Malaysia
