= List of fictional people of the Three Kingdoms =

The following is a list of fictional people significant to the Three Kingdoms period (220–280) of China. The list includes characters in the 14th-century historical novel Romance of the Three Kingdoms by Luo Guanzhong and those found in other cultural references to the Three Kingdoms period.

== In Romance of the Three Kingdoms ==
=== Chapter 1 ===
- Nan Hua (南華), a Taoist immortal from Mount Hua who gave Zhang Jue the book "Taiping Yaoshu" and told him to spread the teachings in the book. He is the Saint Hermit of the Southern Land. This character is loosely based on Zhuang Zhou (author of the Zhuangzi), who was posthumously awarded the title "Nanhua Immortal" (南華真人) by Emperor Xuanzong during the Tang dynasty.
- Cheng Yuanzhi (程遠志), a Yellow Turban leader killed by Guan Yu.
- Deng Mao (鄧茂), a Yellow Turban rebel leader killed by Zhang Fei.
- Gong Jing (龔景), the Inspector of Qing Province. He requested aid from Liu Yan when his province came under attack by the Yellow Turban rebels.
- Cheng Kuang (程曠), a eunuch and a member of the Ten Attendants. He is possibly named after and inspired by the historical eunuch Cheng Huang (程璜).

=== Chapter 2 ===
- Yan Zheng (嚴政), Zhang Bao's subordinate. He came under attack by Zhu Jun and Liu Bei. Knowing that defeat was inevitable, he killed Zhang Bao and surrendered.
- Gao Sheng (高昇), Zhang Bao's subordinate. Killed by Zhang Fei.
- Sun Zhong (孫仲), a Yellow Turban rebel leader who occupied Wancheng with Han Zhong and Zhao Hong. They were defeated by Zhu Jun and Liu Bei. Sun Zhong was killed by Liu Bei while attempting to escape.
- Liu Hui (劉恢), the Administrator of Daizhou who offered help to Liu Bei.

=== Chapter 3 ===
- Zhao Meng (趙萌), a Han dynasty general.
- Cui Yi (崔毅), Cui Lie's younger brother.

=== Chapter 5 ===
- Wei Hong (衛弘), a rich man who sponsored Cao Cao when he raised an army to fight Dong Zhuo.
- Bao Zhong (鮑忠), Bao Xin's younger brother who was killed by Hua Xiong in a surprise attack near Sishui Pass. He is based on the historical Bao Tao.
- Yu She (俞涉), a warrior under Yuan Shu who duelled with Hua Xiong outside Sishui Pass and was killed by him.
- Pan Feng (潘鳳), a warrior under Han Fu who engaged Hua Xiong in a duel outside Sishui Pass and was killed by the latter. Pan Feng is the subject of a Chinese internet meme involving a line from the novel, "Here's one of my best men, Pan Feng. He can destroy Hua Xiong." This meme is a cultural phenomenon and has led to a surge in Pan Feng's popularity to rival the more well-known figures of the Three Kingdoms period. This popularity has been attributed to various causes, such as a desire to poke fun at traditions as a novelty, to feelings of helplessness and lack of individual recognition in Chinese society. It has spawned multiple fake biographies detailing the supposed exploits of Pan Feng that were supposedly too great to be mentioned officially.
- Mu Shun (穆順), a warrior under Zhang Yang who was killed by Lü Bu in a duel outside Hulao Pass.
- Fang Yue (方悅), a warrior under Wang Kuang who was killed by Lü Bu in a duel outside Hulao Pass.
- Wu Anguo (武安國), a warrior under Kong Rong who fought against Lü Bu outside Hulao Pass and retreated after Lü Bu severed his hand.
- Zhao Cen (趙岑), a military officer under Dong Zhuo.

=== Chapter 7 ===
- Lady Wu (吳國太), the younger sister of Sun Jian's first wife. She married Sun Jian; their children were Sun Lang and Sun Shangxiang.

=== Chapter 8 ===
- Diaochan (貂蟬), Wang Yun's foster daughter. She caused Lü Bu and Dong Zhuo to turn against each other.

=== Chapter 11 ===
- Zong Bao (宗寶), a general under Kong Rong.
- Huode Xingjun (火德星君), a Taoist deity who decided to delay burning Mi Zhu's house and allow him time to evacuate his family because of his great virtue.

=== Chapter 13 ===
- Cui Yong (崔勇), a military officer under Guo Si. He was killed by Xu Huang.

=== Chapter 14 ===
- Fan Cheng (范成), the Administrator of Luoyang under Cao Cao.
- Li Bie (李別), Li Jue's nephew and Li Xian's brother. He was killed by Xu Chu. He is based on the historical Li Li (李利).
- Xun Zheng (荀正), a subordinate of Yuan Shu's general Ji Ling. He was killed by Guan Yu.

=== Chapter 15 ===
- Chen Heng (陳橫), a vassal under the warlord Liu Yao. He defended Jianye with Xue Li and Zhang Ying when Sun Ce invaded the city, and was killed by Jiang Qin.

=== Chapter 16 ===
- Lady Yan (嚴氏), Lü Bu's first wife. They had a daughter.
- Lady Cao (曹氏), Lü Bu's second wife and the daughter of Cao Bao.

=== Chapter 17 ===
- Wang Hou (王垕), a supply officer under Cao Cao. He was executed by his lord to appease the soldiers' anger over food shortage.
- Zhang Xian (張先), Zhang Xiu's subordinate. He was killed by Xu Chu.
- Lei Xu (雷敘), Zhang Xiu's subordinate.

=== Chapter 19 ===
- Liu An (劉安), a hunter.

=== Chapter 23 ===
- Qin Qingtong (秦慶童), a servant of Dong Cheng who was caught having an affair with his master's concubine. He feared for his life so he betrayed Dong Cheng and informed Cao Cao about his master's assassination plot.
- Yunying (雲英), Dong Cheng's concubine who had an affair with Qin Qingtong.

=== Chapter 27 ===
- Du Yuan (杜遠), a former Yellow Turban rebel who became a bandit leader. He kidnapped Liu Bei's wives, whom Guan Yu was escorting, and brought them to his stronghold. He was later killed by Liao Hua, who released the women and sent them back to Guan Yu. Liao Hua explained everything to Guan Yu and became his subordinate.
- Hu Hua (胡華), Hu Ban's father who previously served as a Consultant (議郎) under Emperor Huan before retiring. He met Guan Yu and gave him a letter, telling him to pass it to his son Hu Ban, who was in Xingyang.
- Kong Xiu (孔秀), a military officer under Cao Cao who was in charge of guarding Dongling Pass (south of present-day Dengfeng, Henan), and was killed by Guan Yu when he refused to allow the latter to pass.
- Han Fu (韓福), the Administrator of Luoyang under Cao Cao. He ambushed Guan Yu outside Luoyang and injured Guan Yu's arm with an arrow but met his end at Guan Yu's hands.
- Meng Tan (孟坦), Han Fu's subordinate who was killed by Guan Yu while attempting to kill him in an ambush outside Luoyang.
- Bian Xi (卞喜), a military officer under Cao Cao who was tasked with guarding Sishui Pass (north of present-day Xingyang, Henan). He pretended to invite Guan Yu to attend a banquet in a temple, where he had secretly set up an ambush. Guan Yu discovered the ambush, killed Bian Xi, and passed through Sishui Pass safely.
- Pujing (普淨), a monk who comes from the same village as Guan Yu. He warned Guan Yu about Bian Xi's ambush. Later he helped Guan Yu's spirit to find peace. His name also translates to Universal Purity.
- Wang Zhi (王植), the Administrator of Xingyang under Cao Cao pretended to welcome Guan Yu and let him stay in the guesthouse. That night, he ordered his men to surround the guesthouse and set fire to it, hoping to kill Guan Yu, but Guan Yu had already escaped after being tipped off by Hu Ban. Wang Zhi led his men in pursuit of Guan Yu and caught up with him, but ended up being killed by Guan Yu.
- Hu Ban (胡班), Hu Hua's son who served as Wang Zhi's subordinate. He warned Guan Yu about Wang Zhi's plot and helped Guan Yu escape from Xingyang.
- Qin Qi (秦琪), a subordinate of Xiahou Dun who was in charge of guarding a ferry point on the southern bank of the Yellow River. He was killed by Guan Yu in anger when he refused to allow him to cross the river.

=== Chapter 28 ===
- Guan Ding (關定), Guan Ping's father.
- Guan Ning (關寧), Guan Ping's elder brother.
- Guo Chang (郭常), a man whose son stole the Red Hare from Guan Yu.
- Pei Yuanshao (裴元紹), a former Yellow Turban rebel who established a bandit stronghold together with Zhou Cang. When Guan Yu passed by their stronghold, the two men pledged allegiance to him and became his followers. Zhou Cang accompanied Guan Yu while Pei Yuanshao remained in the stronghold. Not long later, Pei Yuanshao was killed by Zhao Yun when he attempted to steal his horse.
- Zhou Cang (周倉), a former Yellow Turban rebel who pledged allegiance to Guan Yu.

=== Chapter 30 ===
- Xin Ming (辛明), a military officer under Yuan Shao.

=== Chapter 32 ===
- Wang Zhao (汪昭), a military officer under Yuan Tan who was killed by Xu Huang.
- Cen Pi (岑璧), a military officer under Yuan Tan who led the vanguard force when Yuan Tan attacked Yuan Shang. He was killed by Lü Kuang in a duel.

=== Chapter 33 ===
- Peng An (彭安), a military officer under Yuan Tan who was killed by Xu Huang.
- Wuhuanchu (烏桓觸), the Administrator of You Province who surrendered to Cao Cao during the Battle of White Wolf Mountain.

=== Chapter 34 ===
- Zhang Wu (張武), a bandit leader in Jiangxia Commandery who caused much trouble for Liu Biao, the Governor of Jing Province. Liu Bei, who was Liu Biao's guest then, offered to help to deal with the bandits. Zhang Wu was killed by Zhao Yun.
- Chen Sun (陳孫), Zhang Wu's companion who was killed by Zhang Fei.

=== Chapter 36 ===
- Liu Mi (劉泌), Liu Feng's maternal uncle.

=== Chapter 40 ===
- Li Gui (李珪), an adviser of Liu Biao who was executed by Cai Mao.

=== Chapter 41 ===
- Xiahou En (夏侯恩), a military officer under Cao Cao who was in charge of safekeeping Cao Cao's Qinggang Sword (青釭劍). He was killed by Zhao Yun, who took the sword from him.
- Chunyu Dao (淳于導), Cao Ren's subordinate who was killed by Zhao Yun.
- Yan Ming (晏明), Cao Hong's subordinate who was killed by Zhao Yun.
- Zhong Jin (鐘縉), Xiahou Dun's subordinate who was killed by Zhao Yun.
- Zhong Shen (鐘紳), Xiahou Dun's subordinate who was killed by Zhao Yun.

=== Chapter 42 ===
- Xiahou Jie (夏侯傑), a military officer under Cao Cao. He died of shock when Zhang Fei shouted at Cao Cao and his soldiers at Changban Bridge.

=== Chapter 45 ===
- Cai Xun (蔡勳), Cai Mao's younger brother who originally served Liu Biao but later served Cao Cao after Liu Cong surrendered to Cao Cao. He was killed by Gan Ning in a skirmish between the forces of Cao Cao and Sun Quan before the Battle of Red Cliffs.
- Cai He (蔡和), Cai Mao's younger cousin who served Cao Cao after Liu Cong surrendered. He pretended to defect to Sun Quan's side while serving as a mole for Cao Cao. Zhou Yu knew that he was a spy and used him to spread false information in the enemy camp, leading to Cao Cao mistakenly believing that Huang Gai was planning to surrender to him. He was executed by Zhou Yu just before the Battle of Red Cliffs.
- Cai Zhong (蔡中), Cai He's elder brother and Cai Mao's brother who was killed by Gan Ning during the Battle of Red Cliffs.

=== Chapter 48 ===
- Lü Tong (呂通), a general under Cao Cao. This character is based on the historical Li Tong.

=== Chapter 52 ===
- Liu Xian (劉賢), the son of Liu Du, the Administrator of Lingling Commandery. He joined Xing Daorong in the attempt to ambush Liu Bei's forces but ended up getting captured by Zhang Fei. Liu Bei released him and he was so grateful that he persuaded his father to surrender to Liu Bei.
- Xing Daorong (邢道榮), a general serving under Liu Du who wielded a huge battle axe. When Liu Bei invaded Lingling Commandery, Xing duelled with Zhang Fei and Zhao Yun but was defeated and captured by them. He pretended to surrender to Liu Bei, hoping to lure the enemy into a trap, but his plan failed and he was killed by Zhao Yun.
- Bao Long (鮑隆), Zhao Fan's subordinate who was killed by Zhao Yun.
- Chen Ying (陳應), Zhao Fan's subordinate who was killed by Zhao Yun.

=== Chapter 53 ===
- Gong Zhi (鞏志), an adviser to Jin Xuan, the Administrator of Wuling Commandery. He urged his lord to surrender when Zhang Fei attacked Wuling but was ignored. Gong Zhi then killed Jin Xuan and surrendered to Zhang Fei. Liu Bei appointed him as Administrator of Wuling Commandery to replace Jin Xuan.
- Yang Ling (楊齡), a general under Han Xuan who was killed by Guan Yu.
- Jia Hua (賈華), a military officer under Sun Quan. His lord ordered him to set up an ambush to kill Liu Bei when the latter was meeting Lady Wu in Ganlu Temple. However, Liu Bei sensed the ambush and he pleaded with Lady Wu to spare him. Lady Wu was surprised because she was unaware of Sun Quan's plan to kill Liu Bei, and she shouted for all the assassins to come out of hiding. Lady Wu was furious and wanted to have Jia Hua executed but spared him when Sun Quan intervened.
- Ge Ding (戈定), a man from the same hometown as Taishi Ci. See Battle of Hefei (208)#In Romance of the Three Kingdoms.

=== Chapter 57 ===
- Huang Kui (黃奎), an official who served as a Gentleman (侍郎) in the Han imperial court. He plotted against Cao Cao together with Ma Teng, but their plan was leaked out and Cao Cao had him and his family executed.
- Li Chunxiang (李春香), Huang Kui's concubine who was executed by Cao Cao.
- Miao Ze (苗澤), Huang Kui's brother-in-law who was executed by Cao Cao.

=== Chapter 58 ===
- Zhong Jin (鍾進), Zhong Yao's younger brother.
- Cao Yong (曹永), Cao Ren's subordinate.

=== Chapter 61 ===
- Zhou Shan (周善), a military officer sent by Sun Quan to fetch Sun Shangxiang back to Jiangdong. Sun Shangxiang brought along Liu Bei's young son Liu Shan and they boarded Zhou Shan's ship. Zhao Yun pursued them in an attempt to take back Liu Shan, and he fought with Zhou Shan and his men. Zhang Fei showed up to help Zhao Yun and he killed Zhou Shan.

=== Chapter 62 ===
- Zi Xu (紫虛), a hermit from the Jinping Mountains who predicted the futures of four of Liu Zhang's subordinates – Liu Gui (劉璝), Zhang Ren, Ling Bao (冷苞) and Deng Xian (鄧賢) – as well as Liu Bei's takeover of Yi Province and Pang Tong's death. He is the Master of the Purple Void.

=== Chapter 64 ===
- Yang Bai (楊柏), an officer of Zhang Lu who has his head collected by Ma Chao to serve as a housewarming gift for his surrender to Liu Bei. This event was not recorded in historical texts. He is based on the historical Yang Bai (楊白) and Yang Bo (楊帛) who were both essentially the same person.
- Yang Song (楊松), an adviser to Zhang Lu. He was described to be a greedy man who was easily tempted by riches and luxuries. He was once bribed by Liu Bei's forces to speak ill of Ma Chao in front of Zhang Lu, causing Zhang Lu to distrust Ma Chao and eventually forcing Ma Chao to defect to Liu Bei's side. In another incident, Yang Song accepted bribes from Cao Cao's forces to urge Zhang Lu to surrender during the Battle of Yangping. When Zhang Lu eventually surrendered to Cao Cao, Yang Song hoped to be rewarded but Cao Cao denounced him as a disloyal and untrustworthy person and had him executed.

=== Chapter 65 ===
- Ma Han (馬漢), a military officer under Liu Zhang who was killed by Zhao Yun.
- Liu Jun (劉晙), a military officer under Liu Zhang who was killed by Zhao Yun.

=== Chapter 66 ===
- Mu Shun (穆順), a palace eunuch involved in an assassination plot against Cao Cao. The plot was masterminded by Emperor Xian, who had the support of Empress Fu Shou and her father Fu Wan (伏完). Mu Shun helped by delivering letters, but he was caught and the plot was leaked out. Cao Cao had Mu Shun, the empress, her father, and their families all executed.

=== Chapter 67 ===
- Chang Qi (昌奇), a subordinate of Zhang Lu's general Yang Ren.

=== Chapter 69 ===
- Zhao Yan (趙顏), a man who had his fortune told by Guan Lu.

=== Chapter 70 ===
- Xiahou De (夏侯德), Xiahou Yuan's nephew. He defended Mount Tiandang during the Battle of Mount Dingjun. Liu Bei's forces set fire to his camp and Xiahou De was killed by Yan Yan while he was busy putting out the flames.

=== Chapter 71 ===
- Jiao Bing (焦炳), a military officer under Cao Cao who was killed by Zhao Yun.
- Murong Lie (慕容烈), a subordinate of Wen Ping who was killed by Zhao Yun.

=== Chapter 73 ===
- Zhai Yuan (翟元), Cao Ren's subordinate who was killed by Guan Ping at the Battle of Fancheng.
- Xiahou Cun (夏侯存), Cao Ren's subordinate who was killed by Guan Yu at the Battle of Fancheng.

=== Chapter 74 ===
- Lady Li (李氏), Pang De's wife.

=== Chapter 77 ===
- Zuo Xian (左咸), an adviser of Sun Quan who suggested to his lord to execute Guan Yu.

=== Chapter 78 ===
- Prison Guard Wu (吳押獄), a prison guard who looked after Hua Tuo when the physician was imprisoned by Cao Cao. Before dying in prison, Hua Tuo passed his medical book Qing Nang Shu (青囊書) to Wu in the hope that the latter would inherit his legacy. Wu's wife later attempted to burn the book to avoid trouble, but Wu stopped her and managed to salvage only part of the book.

=== Chapter 80 ===
- Zu Bi (祖弼), the keeper of the Imperial Seal for Emperor Xian. He was executed by Cao Hong for refusing to hand over the seal during Emperor Xian's forced abdication.

=== Chapter 81 ===
- Li Yi (李意), a mysterious old man who divined the future of Shu Han. He warned Liu Bei what would happen should he attack Wu. He is based on the historical Li Yiqi (李意期).

=== Chapter 82 ===
- Tan Xiong (譚雄), Sun Huan's subordinate who was killed by Guan Xing at the Battle of Xiaoting.
- Cui Yu (崔禹), Zhu Ran's subordinate who was killed by Zhang Bao at the Battle of Xiaoting.

=== Chapter 83 ===
- Xia Xun (夏恂), Han Dang's subordinate who was killed by Zhang Bao at the Battle of Xiaoting.
- Zhou Ping (周平), Zhou Tai's younger brother who was killed by Guan Xing at the Battle of Xiaoting.
- Shi Ji (史迹), Pan Zhang's subordinate who was killed by Huang Zhong.

=== Chapter 84 ===
- Chunyu Dan (淳于丹), Lu Xun's subordinate. This character is an amalgamation of two historical figures: Chunyu Shi (淳于式) and Xianyu Dan.

=== Chapter 87 ===
- Guan Suo (關索), Guan Yu's third son who participated in Zhuge Liang's Southern Campaign.
- E Huan (鄂煥), Gao Ding's subordinate.
- Jinhuansanjie (金環三結), a subordinate of Meng Huo. He joined Dongtuna and Ahuinan in defending Nanman territory from invading Shu forces. The Shu army launched a surprise attack on his camp one night, and Jinhuansanjie was killed by Zhao Yun during the chaos.
- Dongtuna (董荼那), a subordinate of Meng Huo. He joined Ahuinan and Jinhuansanjie in defending Nanman territory from the Shu invasion. Jinhuansanjie was killed in action while Dongtuna and Ahuinan were captured. Zhuge Liang released Dongtuna and Ahuinan, who were grateful to him and decided to help him. They plotted against Meng Huo later and captured their lord and presented him to Zhuge Liang. Zhuge Liang released Meng Huo (for the second time) after the latter complained that he was betrayed and captured by his men and did not have a chance to fight a proper battle. Meng Huo then had Dongtuna and Ahuinan executed for their betrayal.
- Ahuinan (阿會喃), a subordinate of Meng Huo who was executed along with Dongtuna.
- Mangyachang (忙牙長), a subordinate of Meng Huo. He was defeated in battle by Wang Ping and later killed by Ma Dai.

=== Chapter 88 ===
- Meng You (孟優), Meng Huo's younger brother.

=== Chapter 89 ===
- King Duosi (朵思大王), the lord of Tulong Cave (禿龍洞) and an ally of Meng Huo. He assisted Meng Huo in countering the Shu army. The poisonous springs and mist outside Tulong Cave deterred the Shu forces from advancing for quite some time.
- Meng Jie (孟節), Meng Huo's elder brother. Unlike Meng Huo and Meng You, he gave up his old primitive lifestyle and was assimilated into civil society. He helped Zhuge Liang by pointing out how to counter the poisonous springs and mist outside Tulong Cave.
- Yang Feng (楊鋒), a Nanman cave lord who was secretly loyal to Shu. He lured Meng Huo into a trap, captured him, and sent him to Zhuge Liang.

=== Chapter 90 ===
- Lady Zhurong (祝融夫人), Meng Huo's wife.
- Cave Lord Dailai (帶來洞主), Lady Zhurong's younger brother. He suggested to Meng Huo to enlist the help of King Mulu and Wutugu to deal with the Shu invaders.
- King Mulu (木鹿大王), the lord of Bana Cave (八納洞) and an ally of Meng Huo. He possessed magical powers and could change the weather and control wild beasts and direct them into battle. He scored some initial victories against the Shu forces with the aid of his powers, but lost when his animals were scared away by Zhuge Liang's flame-spewing wooden beasts. While he was retreating, the elephant he was riding on threw him off its back and trampled him to death.
- Wutugu (兀突骨), the king of Wuge (烏戈) and an ally of Meng Huo. He was described to be gigantic in stature and he dined on venomous serpents. His soldiers wore armour made of dried and oiled rattan, which was light enough to float on water, yet sufficiently hard to prevent sharp blades from penetrating, so they were known as the "Rattan Armour Army" (藤甲兵). He scored initial successes against the Shu forces due to his army's impenetrable armour. However, Zhuge Liang figured out that the armour was flammable, so he ordered his men to lure Wutugu and his soldiers into a trap. Wutugu and his army were set on fire and they all burned to death.
- Tu An (土安), Wutugu's subordinate.
- Xi Ni (奚泥), Wutugu's subordinate.

=== Chapter 91 ===
- Zhang Tao (張韜), a close acquaintance of Guo Nüwang.

=== Chapter 92 ===
- Han De (韓德), a Wei general who followed Xiahou Mao into battle to counter the first of Zhuge Liang's Northern Expeditions. He was killed by Zhao Yun, who also killed his four sons.
- Han Ying (韓瑛), Han De's son.
- Han Yao (韓瑤), Han De's son.
- Han Qiong (韓瓊), Han De's son.
- Han Qi (韓琪), Han De's son.
- Pan Sui (潘遂), Xiahou Mao's subordinate.
- Dong Xi (董禧), Xiahou Mao's subordinate.
- Xue Ze (薛則), Xiahou Mao's subordinate.
- Pei Xu (裴緒), a Shu officer ordered by Zhuge Liang to disguise himself as a Wei officer who broke out of the siege at Nan'an Commandery. Pei Xu then went to Anding Commandery and lied to Cui Liang, luring him to lead his army out of Anding to help Xiahou Mao at Nan'an. Jiang Wei, then still a Wei officer in Tianshui Commandery, saw through Pei Xu's ruse when he tried to lure Ma Zun (馬遵), the Administrator of Tianshui, to lead his army out of Tianshui to help Xiahou Mao at Nan'an.
- Cui Liang (崔諒), the Administrator of Anding Commandery. He feigned surrender to Zhuge Liang after being surrounded, and attempted to lure the Shu forces into a trap at Nan'an Commandery. However, Zhuge Liang saw through his trick, and Cui Liang ended up being killed by Zhang Bao.
- Yang Ling (楊陵), the Administrator of Nan'an Commandery. He collaborated with Cui Liang to lure the Shu forces into a trap at Nan'an, but Zhuge Liang saw through their plan, and Yang Ling was killed by Guan Xing.

=== Chapter 94 ===
- Cheliji (徹里吉), the king of the Qiang people in northwestern China.
- Yadan (雅丹), the chancellor of the Qiang kingdom.
- Yueji (越吉), a Qiang general.
- Han Zhen (韓禎), a Shu general defending Xiping (西平).

=== Chapter 95 ===
- Su Yong (蘇顒), Guo Huai's subordinate.
- Wan Zheng (萬政), Guo Huai's subordinate.
- Chen Zao (陳造), a Wei general. Slain by Ma Dai.

=== Chapter 96 ===
- Zhang Pu (張普), Cao Xiu's subordinate.

=== Chapter 97 ===
- Xie Xiong (謝雄), a Shu military officer who was killed by Wang Shuang.
- Gong Qi (龔起), a Shu military officer who was killed by Wang Shuang.

=== Chapter 100 ===
- Qin Liang (秦良), a Wei general killed by Liao Hua.
- Gou An (苟安), a subordinate of the Shu general Li Yan who was tasked with escorting supplies to the Shu army at the frontline during one of the Northern Expeditions. When he was late by ten days due to drunkenness, Zhuge Liang wanted to execute him but eventually spared him and had him flogged instead. Gou An then defected to the Wei army and was tasked by Sima Yi to spread rumours in the Shu capital Chengdu, causing the Shu emperor Liu Shan to distrust Zhuge Liang and order him to return to Chengdu, resulting in the failure of that Northern Expedition. When Zhuge Liang finally cleared the misunderstanding with Liu Shan, he asked where Gou An was, but Gou An had already fled to Wei. Historically, there was a similarly named Gou An (句安) who served under Jiang Wei in 249. He ran out of supplies and defected to Wei and later served under Zhong Hui during the Conquest of Shu by Wei.

=== Chapter 102 ===
- Cen Wei (岑威), a Wei general killed by Wang Ping.
- Zheng Wen (鄭文), a Wei general.
- Du Rui (杜睿), a Shu general.
- Hu Zhong (胡忠), a Shu general
- Qin Ming (秦明), Qin Lang's younger brother.

=== Chapter 103 ===
- Zhang Qiu (張球), a subordinate of the Wei general Man Chong. He participated in the Battle of Hefei (234) against Eastern Wu, in which he launched a fire attack on Zhuge Jin's naval fleet and drove the latter back.

=== Chapter 106 ===
- Pei Jing (裴景), a Wei general who participated in Sima Yi's Liaodong campaign.
- Qiu Lian (仇連), erroneously called Chou Lian in some translations, was a Wei general who participated in Sima Yi's Liaodong campaign.

=== Chapter 107 ===
- Pan Ju (潘舉), Cao Shuang's subordinate.

=== Chapter 109 ===
- Wang Tao (王韜), Sima Zhao's registrar. He met Jiang Wei at the Battle of Mount Tielong, and suggested praying for a water spring when water ran scarce.

=== Chapter 110 ===
- Ge Yong (葛雍), Guanqiu Jian's subordinate.
- Song Bai (宋白), the Prefect of Shen County.
- Zhu Fang (朱芳), a Wei general.
- Zhang Ming (張明), a Wei general.
- Hua Yong (花永), a Wei general.
- Liu Da (劉達), a Wei general.

=== Chapter 111 ===
- Bao Su (鮑素), a Shu general.

=== Chapter 112 ===
- Wang Zhen (王真), Sima Wang's subordinate.
- Li Peng (李鵬), Sima Wang's subordinate.
- Zeng Xuan (曾宣), Zhuge Dan's subordinate. He surrendered to Wei during Zhuge Dan's Rebellion.
- Chen Jun (陳俊), Sima Zhao's subordinate.

=== Chapter 113 ===
- Zheng Lun (鄭倫), Deng Ai's subordinate. He was killed by Liao Hua.
- Deng Cheng (鄧程), a Wu official.
- Gan Xiu (干休), an old man who met the Wu emperor Sun Xiu in Qu'e County.
- Dang Jun (黨均), Deng Ai's adviser. He bribed the Shu eunuch Huang Hao to spread rumours that Jiang Wei would defect, causing Liu Shan to recall Jiang Wei from the battlefield.

=== Chapter 114 ===
- Wang Guan (王瓘), Deng Ai's subordinate.

=== Chapter 116 ===
- Lu Xun (盧遜), a Shu general defending Nanzheng.
- Ning Sui (甯隨), Jiang Wei's subordinate. He suggested to attack Yong Province via Konghan Valley to force the Wei general Zhuge Xu to retreat from Yinping, allowing Jiang Wei to enter Jiange.

=== Chapter 117 ===
- Lady Li (李氏), Ma Miao's wife. She committed suicide when Jiangyou fell to Wei forces.
- Peng He (彭和), a Shu general.
- Qiu Ben (丘本), a Wei general. He tried to convince Zhuge Zhan to surrender at Mianzhu but Zhuge Zhan refused. He later organised a surprise attack on the pass, leading to Shu's defeat.

=== Chapter 118 ===
- Lady Cui (崔氏), Liu Chen's wife. She committed suicide together with her husband after the fall of Shu.

=== Chapter 119 ===
- Zhang Jie (張節), a Wei official who served as a Gentleman of the Yellow Gate (黃門侍郎).

=== Chapter 120 ===
- Zhang Shang (張尚), a Jin general who killed the Wu general Lu Jing during the conquest of Wu by Jin.
- Chen Yuan (陳元), Yang Hu's subordinate.
- Sun Ji (孫冀), a Wu general who replaced Lu Kang as commander-in-chief of the Wu armies to resist the invading Jin forces.

== Others ==
- Bao Sanniang (鮑三娘), a woman warrior first mentioned in the Ming dynasty stage play "Hua Guan Suo Zhuan" (花關索傳) set during Zhuge Liang's Southern Campaign. She became one of Guan Suo's wives.
- Huaman (花鬘), a woman warrior first mentioned in "Hua Guan Suo Zhuan" (花關索傳) as Meng Huo and Lady Zhurong's daughter. She was captured by Guan Suo in battle, started a romance with him, and eventually became one of his wives.
- Ma Yunlu (馬雲騄), a woman warrior introduced in the 20th-century novel Fan Sanguo Yanyi (反三國演義), an alternate history version of Romance of the Three Kingdoms. She was Ma Chao's younger sister who later married Zhao Yun.

== See also ==
- Lists of people of the Three Kingdoms
