= Hu Jinding =

In-universe information
- Gender: Female
- Spouse: Guan Yu
- Children: Guan Suo (son)
- Origin: Hua Guan Suo Zhuan (花關索傳)

Hu Jinding (Chinese: 胡金定; pinyin: Hú Jīndìng) is a character in Chinese folk stories and opera. She is the wife of Guan Yu and the mother of Guan Suo, also called Hua Guansuo. Her name is not found in the Records of the Three Kingdoms or the novel Romance of the Three Kingdoms. Her story appears in Hua Guan Suo Zhuan (花關索傳), a 15th-century Chinese chantefable (說唱詞話). A copy of the story was found in a Ming dynasty tomb in 1967. In some local traditions, she is identified with Hu Yue Niangniang (胡玥娘娘), who is worshipped in Shanxi and Taiwan as a goddess of healing and childbirth.

== Origins ==
Hu Jinding's story is told in Hua Guan Suo Zhuan (花關索傳). When Liu Bei, Guan Yu, and Zhang Fei became sworn brothers, Liu Bei worried that Guan Yu and Zhang Fei might leave him because of their families. The two men agreed to kill each other's families. Guan Yu killed Zhang Fei's family, while Zhang Fei killed eighteen members of Guan Yu's household. He spared Guan Ping, and Guan Yu's wife, Hu Jinding, escaped while three months pregnant. She returned to her father's home and gave birth to a son.

Hu Jinding raised her son until he was seven years old. He then got lost during the Lantern Festival and was taken in by a man named Suo. At nine, the boy went to study with a Daoist teacher named Hua Yue (花岳), who taught him martial arts. When he was eighteen, he left his teacher to look for his parents. Suo told him that his father was Guan Yu and took him to see his mother. After meeting Hu Jinding again, he took the name Hua Guansuo (花關索). The name came from three people: Hua from his teacher, Guan from his father, and Suo from the man who had raised him. He later went to find Guan Yu and joined Liu Bei's forces.

== In historical records ==
The early histories do not give the name of Guan Yu's wife. A later record says that her surname was Hu (胡). In 1680, Wang Zhudan, an official in Xiezhou, wrote the Stele of Marquis Guan's Ancestral Tomb (关侯祖墓碑记). He based it on an old inscribed brick found by a local scholar named Yu Chang, who was said to have discovered it after a dream. The stele says that Guan Yu married a woman from the Hu family (侯长娶胡氏). It does not give her full name. Local stories call her Hu Yue (胡玥).

Guan Yu's marriage is also mentioned in older historical writings. The Shu Ji (蜀記), quoted by Pei Songzhi in the Records of the Three Kingdoms, tells how Guan Yu asked Cao Cao for permission to marry the wife of Qin Yilu after the capture of Xiapi in 198. Cao Cao agreed at first, but later took the woman for himself. She was known as Lady Du. The Huayang Guozhi (華陽國志) gives another detail about this request. It says that Guan Yu told Cao Cao, "My wife has no son" (妻無子). Neither account names his wife.

The Records of the Three Kingdoms also mentions Guan Yu's family during the fall of Jing Province in 219. When Lü Meng took the province for Sun Quan, he captured the families of Guan Yu and his soldiers. Lü Meng ordered his men to treat them well. He also allowed Guan Yu's messengers to visit the families, so the soldiers would know that their relatives were safe.

Guan Yu also had a daughter. Sun Quan once sent a messenger to ask if his son could marry her, but Guan Yu refused and insulted the messenger. The Records of the Three Kingdoms does not give the daughter's name or say who her mother was.

== Interpretations ==
Little is known about Guan Yu's wife from early historical records. Lin Cuifeng writes that folk stories gave her a fuller life and character. In Ming dynasty stories, Hu Jinding (胡金定) is a mother who escapes death and raises her son through difficult times. In Shanxi folklore, she is called Hu Yue (胡玥), a woman who helps the sick and gives medicine without asking for money. Lin believes that these stories helped turn Guan Yu's wife into a goddess worshipped for her own kindness and care, not only because she was Guan Yu's wife.

Lin also explains Lady Hu's worship through yin and yang. Guan Yu represents yang, or male strength, while Lady Hu represents yin, or the gentler female side. Lin sees them as a pair that brings the two forces together. She also links Lady Hu's worship to women's place in religion. In 2016, the Jiaoxi Xietian Temple in Taiwan built a hall for Guan Yu's wife. The temple wanted it to be a "mother's home" (娘家), where women could pray and speak about things they might not wish to tell Guan Yu. Lin sees this as an example of growing support for equality between women and men in religious worship.

== Deification and modern worship ==
=== Veneration in mainland China ===
In some local traditions, Hu Jinding is also known as Hu Yue (胡玥), or Lady Guan (關夫人). The name Hu Jinding comes from the Ming dynasty story Hua Guan Suo Zhuan, while Hu Yue appears in stories told around Yuncheng, Shanxi. She is worshipped as a goddess of healing, health, and childbirth. Some local accounts say that she was given the title Empress of Nine Spirits (九靈皇后) during the Ming dynasty.

The Changping Guan Emperor Family Temple (常平關帝家廟) in Yuncheng has a Niangniang Hall (娘娘殿) behind its main hall. A statue of Lady Hu stands inside, dressed as an empress. The nearby Xiezhou Guan Emperor Temple also has a Hu Gong Shrine (胡公祠), where her father Hu Bin (胡斌) is worshipped.

A story from Yuncheng tells how Lady Hu fled into the Zhongtiao Mountains with her young son after Guan Yu killed a local tyrant. She gathered herbs from the mountains and made medicine for the villagers, often treating them without asking for money. People later worshipped her as a goddess who could heal the sick and help women have children. Xiezhou also held a herbal medicine fair beginning on the third day of the third lunar month. Local accounts say that merchants visited her shrine during the fair. The market was later held together with the Guan Emperor Temple fair in the fourth lunar month.

In Luoyang, the Guanlin Temple has a Holy Mother Hall (聖母殿), also called the Hundred Illnesses Niangniang Hall (百病娘娘殿). The hall was rebuilt in 1592, during the reign of the Wanli Emperor. It has a statue of Lady Hu, with Guan Ping, Guan Xing, and Guan Yinping beside her.

=== Veneration in Taiwan ===
In Taiwan, Guan Yu's wife is worshipped as Hu Yue Niangniang (胡玥娘娘). People pray to her for good health, children, and help with family troubles. The Jiaoxi Xietian Temple (礁溪協天廟) in Yilan County opened a Lady Hall (夫人殿) in 2016. A large white marble statue of Lady Hu was later placed in the hall. The temple holds that women can come here to pray and talk about matters they may not wish to share with Guan Yu. The hall is called a "mother's home" (娘家) for female worshippers.

Hu Yue's name came up again during a religious dispute in Tainan in June 2024. A private shrine announced a ceremony described as a marriage between Guan Yu and Mazu. The notice angered some worshippers, who said that Guan Yu already had a wife, Hu Yue. The shrine had also changed Mazu's title from Heavenly Holy Mother (天上聖母) to Heavenly Guan Holy Mother (天上關聖母). The Luermen Tianhou Temple, where the event was advertised, said that it had not agreed to any such marriage. The private shrine later apologized for the trouble caused by its announcement.

== In popular culture ==
On 29 October 2021, the Shanxi Museum opened the Tianxia Yunchang — Guan Gong Culture Exhibition (天下云长——关公文化展). Among the items on display was a bronze statue of Guan Niangniang (關娘娘), or Guan Yu's wife, from the Wanli period of the Ming dynasty. It was shown to the public for the first time. The statue shows her seated and holding a ceremonial tablet. She is also known as the Medicine Lady (藥娘娘) in local folklore.

Hu Jinding's story has also been used in Chinese opera. The playwright Deng Xiaoqiu (邓小秋) wrote Guan Yu Ren Qi (关羽认妻, "Guan Yu Recognizes His Wife"), based on the story of Hua Guansuo and his mother. It was performed by the Tianjin Hebei Bangzi Opera Troupe at the China Arts Festival.

In the 1998 Hong Kong comedy film Timeless Romance (超時空要愛), Spencer Lam (林尚義) plays Hu Jinding. His character is originally a temple caretaker who travels back to the Three Kingdoms period and becomes Guan Yu's wife.

Hu Jinding also appears in Sega's arcade card game Sangokushi Taisen. She was added as a Shu archer card in March 2018. Her special ability, Keika no Senritsu (桂花の旋律), makes an allied character stronger and slowly restores their health.

== See also ==
- Guan Suo
- Guan Ping
- Romance of the Three Kingdoms
