= Dynasty Warriors 7 =

2011 video game

- European cover art
- Developer: Omega Force
- Publisher: Tecmo Koei
- Director: Atsushi Miyauchi
- Producer: Akihiro Suzuki
- Designer: Atsushi Ichiyanagi
- Composers: Masayoshi Sasaki; Masako Otsuka; Haruki Yamada; Takashi Yoshida; Masato Koike
- Series: Dynasty Warriors
- Platforms: PlayStation 3 Xbox 360; Microsoft Windows; PlayStation Portable
- Release: March 10, 2011: JP: March 10, 2011; NA: March 29, 2011; AU: March 31, 2011; EU: April 8, 2011 PlayStation Portable; JP: August 25, 2011 Xtreme Legends; JP: September 29, 2011; NA: November 15, 2011; EU: November 18, 2011 Empires; JP: November 8, 2012; EU: February 22, 2013; NA: February 26, 2013 Microsoft Windows; JP: March 9, 2012; WW: December 6, 2018
- Genre: Hack and slash
- Modes: Single-player, multiplayer

Dynasty Warriors 7 (真・三國無双6, Shin Sangoku Musō 6; known in Japan as Shin Sangoku Musou 6) is a 2011 hack and slash game developed by Omega Force and published by Tecmo Koei. It is the seventh installment of the Dynasty Warriors series and the first to be released after original publisher Koei merged with Tecmo. The story is based on the 14th-century Chinese historical novel Romance of the Three Kingdoms. The game was unveiled at the 2010 Tokyo Game Show. On 26 October, it was revealed at the Koei Press Conference to have improved graphics and gameplay, with the support of stereoscopic 3D. It was released in 2011 after news that it has been delayed and was released on both the PlayStation 3 and Xbox 360. Tecmo Koei Japan had released Dynasty Warriors 7 with Xtreme Legends, along with downloadable content up to October 2011 released on PlayStation 3 version, on Microsoft Windows. It was later released worldwide in December 2018 via Steam as Dynasty Warriors 7: Xtreme Legends Definitive Edition.

== Gameplay ==
Dynasty Warriors 7 is the first game in the series to extend past the Battle of Wuzhang Plains. Consequently, the Jin Kingdom was added, bringing the total number of major factions to four.

- This game's Musou mode is not character based but kingdom based.
- The Renbu combat system has been removed, replaced by the return to the familiar charge system, which allows players to end increasingly longer combos with a charge attack of varying effect depending on the current situation. Characters are also allowed to wield more than one weapon during battle, with the ability to execute a special attack upon switching. In addition, both aerial musou attacks (depending on the character) and certain aerial combos have been introduced. Players will still be able to adjust the camera angle.
- Character and weapon level development/customisation can now be done during battle. Players can also choose to switch their equipped weapons during battle and can obtain new weapons by defeating officers.
- Characters have a special attack with a weapon indicated with an EX icon. The EX attack uses a sequence of attacks and/or charge attacks, and the result will vary with most characters. Characters also have 2 musou attacks that they perform using their Ex Weapon which can consist of grapples, midair, charges, quick/heavy strikes or a combo of hits performed in certain ways.
- An additional mode known as Conquest Mode (Chronicle Mode for the Japanese version) has been incorporated into the game. Gameplay features include a player-forged path through China in which the player can also choose to play "Other" characters in the kingdom, due to the fact that they have not been given their own story in Story Mode. Conquest Mode will also feature both online and offline co-operative play. This mode also replaces the old Free Mode present in previous titles.
- The morale bar has been removed from the visual interface; however, the morale system itself still remains and will be reflected from the messages of officers and their respective facial expressions (neutral, happy, sad, angry etc.) when said message appears.
- Some of the major battles are split into two parts, so the player can have a different perspectives of the battle. One example would be in Shu's Changban stage — the first part concentrating on Zhao Yun and the second part on Zhang Fei.
- Swimming and climbing ladders from the previous Dynasty Warriors 6 are once again present.
- The Weapon system has been changed dramatically from previous titles and players can now choose up to 10 or 11 weapons from each weapon category, unique Weapons are once again available after being cut from Dynasty Warriors 6
- Support animals which aid players in battle are included in this installment — some will follow and battle with the player; some can be ridden. Available animals are horses, bears, pandas, elephants, wolves, tigers and falcons.
- Downloadable Content will be available. Content will include stages, music and costumes from previous games and some original costumes plus new weapons and the option to use the original Japanese Voices.

=== Characters ===
* Denotes new characters to the series
** Denotes characters added in Dynasty Warriors 7: Xtreme Legends
*** Denotes characters added in Dynasty Warriors 7: Empires
Bold denotes default characters

Shu	Wei	Wu	Jin	Other
**Bao Sanniang***	Cai Wenji*	Da Qiao	Deng Ai*	Diao Chan
Guan Ping	**Cao Cao**	Ding Feng*	Guo Huai*	Dong Zhuo
Guan Suo*	Cao Pi	Gan Ning	Sima Shi*	Lu Bu
Guan Yu	Cao Ren	Huang Gai	**Sima Yi**	Meng Huo
Huang Zhong	Dian Wei	Lian Shi*	**Sima Zhao***	Yuan Shao
Jiang Wei	Guo Jia**	Ling Tong	Wang Yuanji*	Zhang Jiao
**Liu Bei**	Jia Xu*	Lu Meng	Xiahou Ba*	**Zhu Rong**
Liu Shan*	Pang De**	Lu Xun	Zhong Hui*	
Ma Chao	Wang Yi**	Sun Ce	Zhuge Dan*	
Ma Dai*	**Xiahou Dun**	**Sun Jian**		
Pang Tong	Xiahou Yuan	Sun Quan		
Wei Yan	Xu Huang	**Sun Shang Xiang**		
Xing Cai	Xu Zhu	Taishi Ci		
Xu Shu***	Zhang He	Xiao Qiao		
Yue Ying	Zhang Liao	Zhou Tai		
Zhang Fei	Zhen Ji	Zhou Yu		
Zhao Yun				
Zhuge Liang				

Note 1: This is Cai Wenji's first appearance in a European or North American Dynasty Warriors game. She is, however, a playable character in Shin Sangoku Musou: Multi Raid 2, currently only available in Japan.

Note 2: Zuo Ci did not return due to a lack of story for him.

Note 3: Guo Jia, Pang De and Wang Yi were added in Dynasty Warriors 7: Xtreme Legends.

Note 4: Xu Shu was added in Dynasty Warriors 7: Empires.

== Story Mode ==
=== Shu ===
Stage	The Name of Battle	Year	Events and Movies	Ally Commander	Enemy Commander	Character
01	Yellow Turban Rebellion - Part 1	184 AD	Making a Stand; Flames of the Heavens; Pure of Heart	Liu Bei	Zhang Jiao	Liu Bei (debut)
01	Yellow Turban Rebellion - Part 2	184 AD	Making a Stand; Flames of the Heavens; Pure of Heart	Liu Bei	Zhang Jiao	Liu Bei (debut)
02	Elimination of Dong Zhuo - Part 1	191 AD	The Unknown Hero; Blade of Righteousness; The Beast	Liu Bei; Yuan Shao	Dong Zhuo	Guan Yu (debut)
02	Elimination of Dong Zhuo - Part 2	191 AD	The Unknown Hero; Blade of Righteousness; The Beast	Liu Bei; Yuan Shao	Dong Zhuo	Guan Yu (debut)
03	Battle of Xu Province	194 AD	The Wanderer	Liu Bei; Tao Qian	Cao Cao	Zhang Fei (debut)
04	Battle of Xiapi	198 AD	The Spirit of a Warrior	Liu Bei; Cao Cao	Lu Bu	Guan Yu
05	Battle of Guandu	200 AD	Enter Zhao Yun; Guan Yu's Offering; Faith; The God of War Returns	Liu Bei; Yuan Shao^{1} Sun Quan	Cao Cao; Yuan Shao^{1}	Zhao Yun (debut)
06	Battle of Xinye	208 AD	The Crouching Dragon; The Power of Intelligence; The Three Visits; Benevolence	Liu Bei; Sun Quan	Cao Hong	Zhang Fei
07	Battle of Changban - Part 1	208 AD	Conflict at Changban; The Little One; The Fearsome Zhang Fei	Liu Bei; Zhang Fei^{2} Zhao Yun^{2}	Cao Cao	Zhao Yun
07	Battle of Changban - Part 2	208 AD	Conflict at Changban; The Little One; The Fearsome Zhang Fei	Liu Bei; Zhang Fei^{2} Zhao Yun^{2}	Cao Cao	Zhang Fei
08	Battle of Chibi - Part 1	208 AD	Southeastern Winds; Fated Encounter; A Dangerous Path; New Allies	Liu Bei; Liu Qi^{3} Zhuge Liang^{3}	Cao Cao	Zhao Yun
08	Battle of Chibi - Part 2	208 AD	Southeastern Winds; Fated Encounter; A Dangerous Path; New Allies	Liu Bei; Liu Qi^{3} Zhuge Liang^{3}	Cao Cao	Guan Yu
09	Battle of Luo Castle	215 AD	The Phoenix Takes Flight; The Death of Pang Tong	Liu Bei; Wei Yan; Pang Tong	Liu Xun	Pang Tong (debut)
10	Battle of Chengdu	215 AD	To Chengdu; A Benevolent Ruler	Liu Bei; Ma Liang	Liu Zhang	Zhuge Liang (debut)
11	Battle of Mt. Dingjun	218 AD	The Veteran's Duty; Decoy	Liu Bei; Zhuge Liang	Cao Cao	Huang Zhong (debut)
12	Battle of Fan Castle - Part 1	220 AD	Guan Yu's Sons; Farewell; Blind Rage	Liu Shan^{4} Guan Yu^{4}	Cao Ren	Guan Yu
12	Battle of Fan Castle - Part 2	220 AD	Guan Yu's Sons; Farewell; Blind Rage	Liu Shan^{4} Guan Yu^{4}	Cao Ren	Guan Suo (debut)
13	Battle of Yiling - Part 1	222AD	To Liu Bei; Calming the Storm; The Task Left Unfulfilled	Liu Bei; Ma Su^{5} Zhao Yun^{5}	Lu Xun	Zhao Yun
13	Battle of Yiling - Part 2	222AD	To Liu Bei; Calming the Storm; The Task Left Unfulfilled	Liu Bei; Ma Su^{5} Zhao Yun^{5}	Lu Xun	Zhuge Liang
14	Battle of Tianshui	228 AD	Zhuge Liang's Vow; The Prodigy of Tianshui; Spirit of Benevolence	Liu Shan; Fei Yi	Jiang Wei	Zhuge Liang
15	Battle of Wuzhang Plains - Part 1	234 AD	The Torch is Passed; Convictions; The Victor; Shooting Star	Liu Shan; Zhuge Liang	Sima Yi	Jiang Wei (debut)
15	Battle of Wuzhang Plains - Part 2	234 AD	The Torch is Passed; Convictions; The Victor; Shooting Star	Liu Shan; Zhuge Liang	Sima Yi	Jiang Wei (debut)

^{1} Yuan Shao becomes enemy after Zhao Yun discovers Guan Yu.
^{2} Another Ally Commander in Part 1 is Zhang Fei, and in Part 2 is Zhao Yun.
^{3} Another Ally Commander in Part 1 is Liu Qi, and in Part 2 is Zhuge Liang.
^{4} Ally Commander in Part 1 is Liu Shan, and in Part 2 are Liu Shan and Guan Yu.
^{5} Another Ally Commander in Part 1 is Ma Su, and in Part 2 is Zhao Yun.

=== Wei ===
Stage	The Name of Battle	Year	Events and Movies	Ally Commander	Enemy Commander	Character
01	Dong Zhuo's Trap	189 AD	The Corruption of the Han; The Animal, Lu Bu; Escape	Cao Cao	Guo Si	Cao Cao (debut)
02	Elimination of Dong Zhuo - Part 1	191 AD	The God of War	Liu Bei; Yuan Shao	Dong Zhuo	Xiahou Yuan (debut)
02	Elimination of Dong Zhuo - Part 2	191 AD	The God of War	Liu Bei; Yuan Shao	Dong Zhuo	Xiahou Yuan (debut)
03	Battle of Yan Province	194 AD	Enter Dian Wei; The Gentle Giant; The Qingzhou Troops	Cao Cao; Cao Hong	Xu Zhu	Dian Wei (debut)
04	Battle of Xu Province - Part 1	194 AD	Elite Guards; A New land	Cao Cao; Cao Ang	Tao Qian	Xu Zhu (debut)
04	Battle of Xu Province - Part 2	194 AD	Elite Guards; A New land	Cao Cao; Cao Ang	Tao Qian	Xu Zhu (debut)
05	Battle of Wan Castle - Part 1	197 AD	Jia Xu and Zhang Xiu; The Death of Dian Wei; The Meaning of Revenge	Cao Cao; Dian Wei^{1} Yue Jin^{1}	Jia Xu	Dian Wei
05	Battle of Wan Castle - Part 2	197 AD	Jia Xu and Zhang Xiu; The Death of Dian Wei; The Meaning of Revenge	Cao Cao; Dian Wei^{1} Yue Jin^{1}	Jia Xu	Cao Cao
06	Battle of Xiapi	198 AD	Shattered Vision; The Spirit of a Warrior; The Value of the Emperor	Liu Bei; Cao Cao; Cao Hong	Lu Bu	Xiahou Dun (debut)
07	Battle of Guandu - Part 1	200 AD	A Sharp Gaze; Wuchao in Flames; Looking into the Distance	Cao Cao; Cao Pi; Cao Hong^{2} Xiahou Dun^{2} Cao Zhang^{2} Xun Yu^{2}	Yuan Shao	Cao Pi (debut)
07	Battle of Guandu - Part 2	200 AD	A Sharp Gaze; Wuchao in Flames; Looking into the Distance	Cao Cao; Cao Pi; Cao Hong^{2} Xiahou Dun^{2} Cao Zhang^{2} Xun Yu^{2}	Yuan Shao	Cao Pi (debut)
08	Battle of Changban	208 AD	The Duty of a Warrior; Guardian of Changban; A United Front	Cao Cao	Liu Bei^{3} Guan Yu^{3}	Zhang Liao (debut)
09	Battle of Chibi - Part 1	208 AD	Bound by Honor; A Time for Rest	Cao Cao; Cao Zhang^{4}	Liu Bei; Sun Quan^{4}	Xu Zhu
09	Battle of Chibi - Part 2	208 AD	Bound by Honor; A Time for Rest	Cao Cao; Cao Zhang^{4}	Liu Bei; Sun Quan^{4}	Cao Cao
10	Battle of Tong Gate	211 AD	The Strategist; Ma Chao's Leap; What Lies Ahead	Cao Cao; Xiahou Yuan	Ma Chao	Jia Xu (debut)
11	Battle of Yangping Gate	215 AD	Grace on the Battlefield	Cao Cao; Cao Xiu	Zhang Lu	Xiahou Yuan
12	Battle of Hefei - Part 1	215 AD	Swift as the Wind; Guardian of Hefei	Cao Cao; Li Dian^{5} Yue Jin; Xue Ti^{5}	Sun Quan^{5} Taishi Ci^{5}	Zhang Liao
12	Battle of Hefei - Part 2	215 AD	Swift as the Wind; Guardian of Hefei	Cao Cao; Li Dian^{5} Yue Jin; Xue Ti^{5}	Sun Quan^{5} Taishi Ci^{5}	Zhang Liao
13	Battle of Mount Dingjun - Part 1	218 AD	Volley; The Death of Xiahou Yuan; One Life for Another	Cao Cao; Zhang He^{6} Cao Zhi^{6}	Zhuge Liang	Xiahou Yuan
13	Battle of Mount Dingjun - Part 2	218 AD	Volley; The Death of Xiahou Yuan; One Life for Another	Cao Cao; Zhang He^{6} Cao Zhi^{6}	Zhuge Liang	Zhang He (debut)
14	Battle of Fan Castle - Part 1	220 AD	Decision; Final Confrontation; The End of the Chaos; Beyond Conquest; A New Vision	Cao Pi; Lu Chang^{7} Cao Ren^{7}	Guan Yu	Xiahou Dun
14	Battle of Fan Castle - Part 2	220 AD	Decision; Final Confrontation; The End of the Chaos; Beyond Conquest; A New Vision	Cao Pi; Lu Chang^{7} Cao Ren^{7}	Guan Yu	Xiahou Dun

^{1} Another Ally Commander in Part 1 is Dian Wei, and in Part 2 is Yue Jin.
^{2} Another Ally Commander in Part 1 are Cao Hong and Xiahou Dun, and in Part 2 are Cao Zhang and Xun Yu.
^{3} Must defeat Guan Yu even if Liu Bei has withdraws.
^{4} Another Ally Commander in Part 1 is Cao Zhang, and another Enemy Commander in Part 1 is Sun Quan.
^{5} Another Ally Commander in Part 1 is Li Dian, and in Part 2 is Xue Ti. Then must defeat Taishi Ci even if Sun Quan has withdraws.
^{6} Another Ally Commander in Part 1 is Zhang He, and in Part 2 is Cao Zhi.
^{7} Another Ally Commander in Part 1 is Lu Chang, and in Part 2 is Cao Ren.

=== Wu ===
Stage	The Name of Battle	Year	Events and Movies	Ally Commander	Enemy Commander	Character
01	Conquest of Liang Province	189 AD	The Meaning of War; Man and Beast as One; The Passion of Youth	Sun Jian	Bian Zhang	Sun Jian (debut)
02	Ou Xing's Rebellion	189 AD	Where the Steely Gaze Roams; The Bonds of Family	Sun Jian; Sun Quan; Sun Kuang; Sun Ce	Ou Xing	Sun Quan (debut)
03	Elimination of Dong Zhuo - Part 1	191 AD	The Magnificent Warrior; A Worthy Fore; The Imperial Seal	Liu Bei; Yuan Shao	Dong Zhuo	Sun Jian
03	Elimination of Dong Zhuo - Part 2	191 AD	The Magnificent Warrior; A Worthy Fore; The Imperial Seal	Liu Bei; Yuan Shao	Dong Zhuo	Sun Jian
04	Battle of Jing Province	191 AD	The Tiger Falls	Sun Jian	Liu Biao	Sun Ce (debut)
05	Battle of Wujun - Part 1	199 AD	Newfound Resolve; The Eyes of a Warrior; The Little Conqueror	Sun Quan; Sun Ce	Liu Yao	Zhou Yu (debut)
05	Battle of Wujun - Part 2	199 AD	Newfound Resolve; The Eyes of a Warrior; The Little Conqueror	Sun Quan; Sun Ce	Liu Yao	Sun Ce
06	Defense of Xuan Castle	199 AD	Badges of Honor	Sun Quan; Jiang Qin	Pan Lin	Zhou Tai (debut)
07	Assault on Xuchang - Part 1	200 AD	Echoes of the Past; Phantoms; Guardian Angel; The Little Conqueror Falls	Sun Quan; Sun Ce^{1} Sun Shangxiang^{1} Zhou Yu^{1}	Xiahou Dun	Sun Ce
07	Assault on Xuchang - Part 2	200 AD	Echoes of the Past; Phantoms; Guardian Angel; The Little Conqueror Falls	Sun Quan; Sun Ce^{1} Sun Shangxiang^{1} Zhou Yu^{1}	Xiahou Dun	Sun Quan
08	Battle of Xiakou	203 AD	Wise Counsel; Cooler Heads Prevall; A Decision of Consequence	Sun Quan; Cheng Pu	Huang Zu	Sun Quan
09	Battle of Chibi - Part 1	208 AD	Cooking with Fire; An Unexpected Change of Plans	Liu Bei; Sun Quan; Song Qian^{2} Zhuge Liang^{2}	Cao Cao	Zhou Yu
09	Battle of Chibi - Part 2	208 AD	Cooking with Fire; An Unexpected Change of Plans	Liu Bei; Sun Quan; Song Qian^{2} Zhuge Liang^{2}	Cao Cao	Huang Gai (debut)
10	Battle of Nanjun	208 AD	Hidden Wounds; Union; True Strength	Liu Bei; Sun Quan; Zhou Yu	Cao Ren	Gan Ning (debut)
11	Battle of Hefei - Part 1	215 AD	Gan Ning of the Bells; Defender of Hefei; The Escape	Sun Quan; Sun Kuang; Ling Tong^{3} Gan Ning^{3}	Cao Cao; Zhang Liao	Gan Ning (debut)
11	Battle of Hefei - Part 2	215 AD	Gan Ning of the Bells; Defender of Hefei; The Escape	Sun Quan; Sun Kuang; Ling Tong^{3} Gan Ning^{3}	Cao Cao; Zhang Liao	Ling Tong (debut)
12	Battle of Fan Castle - Part 1	220 AD	Nothing to Lose; The Price of Victory	Sun Quan; Cao Ren; Lu Xun^{4}	Guan Yu	Lu Meng (debut)
12	Battle of Fan Castle - Part 2	220 AD	Nothing to Lose; The Price of Victory	Sun Quan; Cao Ren; Lu Xun^{4}	Guan Yu	Lu Meng (debut)
13	Battle of Yiling - Part 1	222 AD	A New Star Rises; Trustworthy Allies; A Bittersweet Victory	Sun Quan; Sun Deng^{5} Song Qian^{5}	Liu Bei	Lu Xun (debut)
13	Battle of Yiling - Part 2	222 AD	A New Star Rises; Trustworthy Allies; A Bittersweet Victory	Sun Quan; Sun Deng^{5} Song Qian^{5}	Liu Bei	Lu Xun (debut)
14	Battle of Dongkou - Part 1	223 AD	To Glory; A Ruler's Battle; Wu Victory; A Dream Fulfilled	Sun Quan	Cao Pi	Sun Quan
14	Battle of Dongkou - Part 2	223 AD	To Glory; A Ruler's Battle; Wu Victory; A Dream Fulfilled	Sun Quan	Cao Pi	Sun Quan

^{1} Another Ally Commander in Part 1 is Sun Ce, and in Part 2 are Sun Shangxiang and Zhou Yu.
^{2} Another Ally Commander in Part 1 are Song Qian and Zhuge Liang.
^{3} Another Ally Commander in Part 1 is Ling Tong, and in Part 2 is Gan Ning.
^{4} Another Ally Commander in Part 2 is Lu Xun.
^{5} Another Ally Commander in Part 1 is Sun Deng, and in Part 2 is Song Qian.

=== Jin ===
Stage	The Name of Battle	Year	Events and Movies	Ally Commander	Enemy Commander	Character
01	Gongsun Yuan's Rebellion	238 AD	A Mere Fool; A Miserable World	Sima Yi	Gongsun Yuan	Sima Yi (debut)
02	Conquest of Shu	244 AD	Enter Deng Ai; The Han Assassin; The Path of the Sima	Sima Zhao; Cao Shuang	Ma Dai	Sima Zhao (debut)
03	Coup d'état	249 AD	The Fool's Messenger; Cao Shuang Returns; The Prince of Incompetence; Bertayal	Sima Yi	Cao Shuang	Sima Yi
04	Han Invasion (3rd Jiang Wei's Northern Expeditions)	249 AD	Stubbornness	Sima Zhao; Wang Guan	Jiang Wei	Sima Shi (debut)
05	Wang Ling's Rebellion	251 AD	Father to Son	Sima Yi; Sima Zhao	Wang Ling	Sima Yi
06	Battle of Dongxing - Part 1	252 AD	Gravity; Ding Feng Makes His Stand; Responsibility	Sima Zhao; Sima Wang; Zhuge Dan^{1}	Zhuge Ke	Zhuge Dan (debut)
06	Battle of Dongxing - Part 2	252 AD	Gravity; Ding Feng Makes His Stand; Responsibility	Sima Zhao; Sima Wang; Zhuge Dan^{1}	Zhuge Ke	Wang Yuanji (debut)
07	Battle of New Hefei Castle	253 AD	Punishment for Failure	Sima Zhao; Yue Chen	Zhuge Ke	Sima Shi
08	2nd Han Invasion - Part 1 (7th Jiang Wei's Northern Expeditions - Part 1)	255 AD	The Loyal Servant of Wei; A Debt to be Repaid; The Death of Guo Huai	Sima Zhao; Sima Wang^{2} Wang Yuanji	Jiang Wei	Guo Huai (debut)
08	2nd Han Invasion - Part 2 (7th Jiang Wei's Northern Expeditions - Part 2)	255 AD	The Loyal Servant of Wei; A Debt to be Repaid; The Death of Guo Huai	Sima Zhao; Sima Wang^{2} Wang Yuanji	Jiang Wei	Deng Ai (debut)
09	Attack on Sima Shi	255 AD	A Leisurely Stroll; Near Miss	Sima Zhao; Sima Shi	Xiahou Xuan	Sima Zhao
10	Guanqiu Jian & Wen Qin's Rebellion - Part 1	255 AD	The Arrow of Fate; Things Beyond One's Control; History Repeats	Sima Zhao; Yue Chen; Zhuge Dan^{3}	Guanqiu Jian; Wen Qin	Sima Shi
10	Guanqiu Jian & Wen Qin's Rebellion - Part 2	255 AD	The Arrow of Fate; Things Beyond One's Control; History Repeats	Sima Zhao; Yue Chen; Zhuge Dan^{3}	Guanqiu Jian; Wen Qin	Sima Shi
11	3rd Han Invasion (9th Jiang Wei's Northern Expeditions)	256 AD	Taking the Reins	Sima Zhao; Chen Tai	Jiang Wei	Sima Zhao
12	4th Han Invasion - Part 1 (10th Jiang Wei's Northern Expeditions - Part 1)	257 AD	Stealing Glory; One Step Behind; Face to Face	Sima Zhao; Deng Ai^{4} Zhong Hui^{4}	Jiang Wei	Zhong Hui (debut)
12	4th Han Invasion - Part 2 (10th Jiang Wei's Northern Expeditions - Part 2)	257 AD	Stealing Glory; One Step Behind; Face to Face	Sima Zhao; Deng Ai^{4} Zhong Hui^{4}	Jiang Wei	Deng Ai
13	Zhuge Dan's Rebellion - Part 1	258 AD	Unbridled Anger; An Inconvenient Truth; Zhuge Dan's Crime	Sima Zhao; Wang Yuanji^{5} Wen Yang^{5} Wen Hu^{5}	Zhuge Dan	Sima Zhao
13	Zhuge Dan's Rebellion - Part 2	258 AD	Unbridled Anger; An Inconvenient Truth; Zhuge Dan's Crime	Sima Zhao; Wang Yuanji^{5} Wen Yang^{5} Wen Hu^{5}	Zhuge Dan	Sima Zhao
14	Wei's Emperor's Last Stand	260 AD	The Wei Emperor's Answer; The Pages of History	Sima Zhao	Cao Mao	Sima Zhao
15	Capture of Chengdu - Part 1	263 AD	Crossing the Mountains; The Han Emperor; A Peaceful End; Trapped by Dreams; The Three Kingdoms End	Sima Zhao; Sima Wang^{6} Jia Chong^{6}	Liu Shan; Jiang Wei^{7}	Zhong Hui
15	Capture of Chengdu - Part 2	263 AD	Crossing the Mountains; The Han Emperor; A Peaceful End; Trapped by Dreams; The Three Kingdoms End	Sima Zhao; Sima Wang^{6} Jia Chong^{6}	Liu Shan; Jiang Wei^{7}	Deng Ai
15	Capture of Chengdu - Part 3	263 AD	Crossing the Mountains; The Han Emperor; A Peaceful End; Trapped by Dreams; The Three Kingdoms End	Sima Zhao; Sima Wang^{6} Jia Chong^{6}	Liu Shan; Jiang Wei^{7}	Sima Zhao

^{1} Another Ally Commander in Part 2 is Zhuge Dan.
^{2} Another Ally Commander in Part 1 are Sima Wang and Wang Yuanji, and in Part 2 is Wang Yuanji.
^{3} Another Ally Commander in Part 2 is Zhuge Dan.
^{4} Another Ally Commander in Part 1 is Deng Ai, and in Part 2 is Zhong Hui.
^{5} Another Ally Commander in Part 1 is Wang Yuanji, and in Part 2 are Wen Yang and Wen Hu.
^{6} Another Ally Commander in Part 1 is Wen Hu, in Part 2 is Sima Wang, and in Part 3 is Jia Chong.
^{7} Must defeat Jiang Wei even if Liu Shan withdraws.

== Reception ==
Reception

Aggregate score
Aggregator	Score
Metacritic	57/100

Review scores
Publication	Score
Destructoid	8/10
Famitsu	36/40; 35/40 (Empires)
IGN	5/10

Dynasty Warriors 7 received "mixed or average" reviews upon release, according to video game review aggregator Metacritic.

Colin Moriarty from IGN titled his review "Repetitive adventure is repetitive" and said Dynasty Warriors 7 is "simply too much of the same thing over and over again to have any sort of broad appeal". He scored the game 5/10.

Famitsu magazine was quite less critical, and awarded the game a total of 36/40, composed of a 9/9/9/9 score and was considered a great improvement over previous titles. In the first week of its release it sold 253,900 copies.

Destructoid awarded the game 8/10 in a generally positive review, noting the only disappointments being the low variation in move sets, and the lack of Free Mode. The Gamer's Hub rated the game 4/5, commending the improved graphics, the new conquest mode, and the better flowing story.

== Related games ==
In late May 2011, Tecmo Koei announced that the game would be ported to the PlayStation Portable under the name Shin Sangokumusou 6 Special. It was released on August 25, 2012. During E3, Koei announced that the game will not be sold overseas, but that a new Dynasty Warriors game called Dynasty Warriors Next was in development for PS Vita and will be sold overseas instead.

On the 29th of June, Famitsu released information about the new Dynasty Warriors 7: Xtreme Legends. The game features 3 new characters, only for Wei: Guo Jia (who won a poll conducted by Famitsu), Wang Yi, and Pang De (who returns to the flagship title for the first time since Dynasty Warriors 5). The game features the ability to port saved data from Dynasty Warriors 7, and the MIX-JOY system allows new modes and weapons from Xtreme Legends to be combined with those from Dynasty Warriors 7. Free Mode returns, along with a co-op Story Mode, both of which were absent in Dynasty Warriors 7. Two more modes, Challenge Mode and Legend Mode, are added. It was released on September 29, 2011 in Japan, November 15, 2011 in United States, and November 18, 2011 in Europe as a PlayStation 3 exclusive title. Thus far, there have been no plans to release the game on other platforms. However, since the announcement of Dynasty Warriors 7 with Xtreme Legends on Microsoft Windows platform, Xtreme Legends may no longer be considered a PlayStation 3 exclusive title. The Microsoft Windows port, in particular, was given a refresh and was released worldwide through digital distribution service Steam in December 2018, under the name Dynasty Warriors 7 Xtreme Legends Definitive Edition.

The Dynasty Warriors characters who appear in the crossover game Warriors Orochi 3 use the character models from this game. However, their dual-weapon ability is removed and characters are fixed to wield certain weapon types.

In May 2012, the Empires expansion for the game was announced to be released on PlayStation 3 on November 8, 2012 in Japan. As with other Empires expansion, the game is more focused on political and tactical battle system. It includes a new character named Xu Shu. The game was also released in North America and Europe on February 26 and 22, 2013 respectively, though the game only translates the texts while still using the original Japanese dubs. Like Warriors Orochi 3, the game will only be available through digital download in North America, while other regions will have it as retail.

== See also ==
- Dynasty Warriors
- Romance of the Three Kingdoms
- Koei
- Warriors Orochi
- Samurai Warriors
