= Mulu, Iran =

Mulu (Persian: مولو) in Iran may refer to:

- Mulu, Maragheh, East Azerbaijan Province
- Mulu, Kermanshah
