= Huaman (Three Kingdoms) =

Fictional character from the theatrical opera "Dragon and Phoenix Headgear"

Huaman (花鬘) is a fictional character who originated in "Dragon and Phoenix Headgear" (龍鳳巾; also known as "The Strange Love Beyond the Border"), a theatrical opera retelling Shu Han's conquest of Nanman during the Three Kingdoms period (220–280). She is portrayed as the daughter of Meng Huo, the king of the Southern Barbarians, and Lady Zhurong. She is described to be one of the wives of Guan Suo, a fictional son of Guan Yu.

She is not mentioned in historical records such as Records of the Three Kingdoms or the novel Romance of the Three Kingdoms; she exists solely as a fictional character in the opera. Unlike typical noble ladies, her character resembles her mother Zhurong and is depicted as a female warrior skilled in combat with weapons. In Guan Yinping's folklore, she's known as "Hua Zhongxiu" (花中秀) and joins Guan Suo's sister's female army, alongside his other wives.

== Fictional biography ==
In the opera, she was first introduced in a stage play in the setting of Zhuge Liang's Southern Campaign against the Nanman. When Zhuge Liang marches to subdue King Meng Huo of the Southern Barbarians, Huaman joins in the resistance against the invaders. She once fought against Guan Suo but failed and fell off her horse. Unable to bring himself to kill her, Guan Suo lets her return to her camp. Later, after Guan Suo was defeated and captured, they developed feelings for each other, but due to their opposing allegiances, they could only engage privately. Huaman was later captured by the Shu camp, leading to an exchange of captives between the two camps. Despite their opposing allegiances and numerous clashes, their love blossomed, eventually leading to Meng Huo's surrender in the climax of the play. Zhuge Liang sanctioned their marriage, solidifying the alliance between Shu and the Nanman.

== Historical references ==
Huaman is not mentioned in the historical records or the novel Romance of the Three Kingdoms, only appearing in folktales and stage performances like the Beijing opera "Dragon and Phoenix Headgear." In the folk legends of Guan Yinping, her name is Hua Zhongxiu, described as Guan Suo's concubine, along with Bao Sanniang, Wang Tao, and Wang Yue, who are all included in Guan Yinping's female army. In the storytelling opera "The Story of Hua Guansuo" published during the Ming Dynasty, Guan Suo marries Bao Sanniang, Wang Tao, and Wang Yue, with no mention of Huaman throughout the entire narrative.

== Sources and references ==
- "The Story of Hua Guansuo: A Newly Compiled Full Version of the Story of Hua Guansuo's Demotion to Yunnan."
