= DW8 =

DW8 may refer to:

- Dynasty Warriors 8
- PSA EW/DW engine#DW8
