= Guan Yinping =

Noble woman of the Three Kingdom period

Lady Guan
- 關氏

Personal details
- Born: 3rd-century
- Relations: Guan Ping (brother); Guan Xing (brother)
- Parent: Guan Yu (father)

Military service
- Allegiance: Shu Han

Lady Guan (Chinese: 關氏; pinyin: Guān Shì), referred to as Guan Yinping (關銀屏; Guān Yínpíng) in folktales, was a Chinese noblewoman from the state of Shu Han during the late Eastern Han dynasty and the Three Kingdoms period. She was the daughter of Guan Yu, a prominent general under Liu Bei, the founder of Shu Han state.

== Historical accounts ==
In historical records, when Liu Bei became the King of Hanzhong, Sun Quan, the ruler of Eastern Wu, proposed a marriage between his son and Lady Guan as a gesture of alliance. However, Guan Yu vehemently rejected the proposal and berated the envoy, which infuriated Sun Quan. Sun Quan's fury in response to Guan Yu's actions led to worsening relations between Liu Bei and Sun Quan, ultimately resulting in the general's isolation within Jing Province, which would later lead to the Battle of Fan castle and the Battle of Yiling. (Note: (曹公議徙許都以避其銳，司馬宣王、蔣濟以為關羽得志，孫權必不願也。可遣人勸權躡其後，許割江南以封權，則樊圍自解。曹公從之。先是，權遣使為子索羽女，羽罵辱其使，不許婚，權大怒。) Sanguozhi vol. 36.)

The idea of forming an alliance with Sun Quan was advocated by Sima Yi and Jiang Ji, who saw an opportunity during this rift and advised Cao Cao accordingly. This is the extent of the historical account in Records of the Three Kingdoms. After these accounts, there are no further recorded events or details regarding Lady Guan's life in historical records.

In the year 264, the Cao Wei state successfully captured Chengdu, marking the destruction of the Shu state. Following this pivotal battle, Pang Hui, the son of Pang De, sought vengeance for his father's death, who had been slain by Guan Yu. In pursuit of this vendetta, Pang Hui reportedly exterminated the Guan family. (Note: (蜀記曰：龐德子會，隨鍾、鄧伐蜀，蜀破，盡滅關氏家。) Shu Ji annotation in Sanguozhi vol. 36.) Whether Lady Guan was still alive at the time of Chengdu's capture remains unknown.

== In folklore ==
=== Names ===
In a 1986 collection of folktales titled Sanguo Waizhuan (三国外传) authored by the Hubei Mass Art Gallery, Lady Guan is referred to as "Guan Yinping", "Miss Guan", or "Third Miss Guan" (關三小姐; Guan Sanxiaojie) in the local folklore. Legend has it that her name "Yinping" was given by Zhang Fei, who named her after a silver treasure he had taken from Lü Bu during the Battle of Hulao Gate. She may also be referred to as Guan E (關娥) or Guan Feng (關鳳).

=== Guan San Xiaojie ===
According to this folktale, Guan Yinping was renowned for her exceptional beauty and intelligence. She was said to have acquired both literary and martial skills by the age of eighteen. Sun Quan, the ruler of Eastern Wu, dispatched Zhuge Jin as an emissary to propose a marital alliance between his family and the Guan family. However, Guan Yu, feeling insulted, responded, "This is like offering a tiger's daughter to a dog; the expectations are too high." Sun Quan was greatly angered by this response, and it contributed to the enmity between Guan Yu and Sun Quan.

In December, 219, during an attack on Guan Yu's Jing province, which seemed on the verge of falling, Guan Yu, under the pretext of seeking reinforcements from Liu Bei and Zhuge Liang, sent Guan Yinping away from Jing to Yi province for her safety. Guan Yu, Guan Ping, and Zhou Cang were later captured and either took their own lives or were executed by Sun Quan's generals, such as Ma Zhong and Lü Meng (according to Romance of the Three Kingdoms, this happened on the 14th of October). It was later rumored that "even though Jingzhou fell, Guan Yinping's life was spared thanks to Lü Bu's pearl."

However, Guan Yinping, driven by the desire for revenge against her father's enemies, went through a period of extreme hardship in Chengdu. Even when Zhang Fei sent her clothing, she shed tears and said, "Beautiful attire does not suit me at this time. I want to avenge my father." She quickly mastered martial arts under the tutelage of Zhao Yun.

The people of Shu felt deep sympathy for the young woman who had suffered the loss of her family and homeland. They regarded her as one of their own and selflessly imparted their knowledge and skills to her. After several years, when turmoil erupted in the southern regions, resisting Shu Han's authority, Zhuge Liang led a southern campaign and enlisted the assistance of Li Hui, the Grand Administrator of Jianning in Yuyuan (modern-day Chengjiang). Acting as a matchmaker, Zhuge Liang arranged for Guan Yinping to marry Li Hui's son, Li Yi (李遺). Guan Yinping willingly accepted this marriage to strengthen the nation's security and accompanied Li Hui's father-son duo on their southern campaign.

Though Guan Yinping originally wished to take revenge on Sun Quan's forces before heading to Yunnan, she eventually accepted the state's priorities, reasoning, "My parents' enemies are like burglars in the front door, and the Yunnan rebellion is like a fire in the backyard. If we put out the fire in the backyard, we can focus on catching the burglars who entered through the front door. Prime Minister Zhuge sees this clearly."

After successfully pacifying the southern regions, Guan Yinping and Li Wei settled in Yuyuan, where they contributed to the local community by imparting various skills, including sericulture, agriculture, literacy, and even martial arts passed down by Zhao Yun. The people of the region came to admire her and affectionately referred to her as "Miss Guan" (关三小姐)).

Throughout her life, Guan Yinping did not leave Yuyuan. She would ascend Jinlian Mountain (also known as Jinlian Peak) each morning, gazing northward while adorning herself and reminiscing about her lost homeland.

Upon her death, Guan Yinping was laid to rest alongside her husband Li Yi. They were later enshrined together. Every year during the Qingming Festival, local residents gather to pay their respects to them, expressing their deep admiration. According to some accounts, she was buried alongside Guan Yu's heirloom pearl, which is said to make the mountain's peak shimmer with five colors on clear days. However, this is likely a legend rather than a historical fact.

In some versions of Guan Yinping's folklore, she recruits her brother Guan Suo's wives — Bao Sanniang, Huaman, Wang Tao, and Wang Yue — to form a female army.

== Sources ==
- "Romance of the Three Kingdoms Supplement: Unveiling the True Faces of Heroes in Folk Tales" (Translated by Shosuke Tatema and Yumi Okazaki), published by Tokuma Shoten in August 1990, ISBN 978-4-19-224331-5.
- Chen, Shou (3rd century). Records of the Three Kingdoms (Sanguozhi).
- Luo, Guanzhong (14th century). Romance of the Three Kingdoms (Sanguo Yanyi).
