= Liu Du (warlord) =

Late 2nd/early 3rd century Chinese official

- 劉度

Administrator of Lingling (零陵太守)
- In office ?–?
- Monarch: Emperor Xian of Han
- Chancellor: Cao Cao

Personal details
- Born: Unknown
- Died: Unknown
- Occupation: Official

Liu Du was a government official who lived during the Eastern Han dynasty of China.

== Life ==
Liu Du served as the Administrator (太守) of Lingling Commandery (零陵郡; around present-day Yongzhou, Hunan).

In 209, the warlord Liu Bei led his forces to conquer the four commanderies in southern Jing Province: Wuling, Changsha, Guiyang, and Lingling. Liu Du surrendered to Liu Bei along with the Administrators of the other three commanderies.

== In Romance of the Three Kingdoms ==
In the 14th-century historical novel Romance of the Three Kingdoms, Liu Du has a son, Liu Xian, whom he at one point sends along with Xing Daorong (also a fictional character) against Liu Bei. However, Liu Du surrenders when hearing of the defeat of Liu Xian.

== See also ==
- Lists of people of the Three Kingdoms
