= Muli (given name) =

Muli is a masculine given name. As a Jewish name, it is a diminutive of "Shmuel", i.e., Samuel. It can also be a Chinese given name, 沐黎; Mùlǐ. Notable people with the name include:

- Muli or Mooley Avishar (born 1947), Israeli basketball player
- Muli Katzurin (born 1954), Israeli basketball coach
- Muli Segev, Israeli TV editor, producer, director and screenwriter, actor and a journalist
- Tang Muli (born 1947), Chinese painter and poet
