= Guan Xing =

3rd-century Chinese Shu Han state official

- 關興
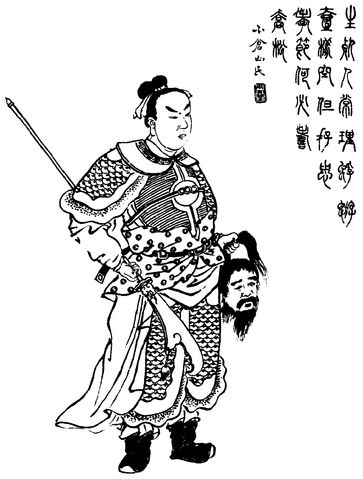
- A Qing dynasty illustration of Guan Xing holding Pan Zhang's head

Personal details
- Children: Guan Tong; Guan Yi
- Parent: Guan Yu (father)
- Relatives: Guan Ping (brother); Lady Guan
- Occupation: Official
- Courtesy name: Anguo (安國)
- Peerage: Marquis of Hanshou Village (漢壽亭侯)

Guan Xing (fl. third century), courtesy name Anguo, was an official of the state of Shu Han in the Three Kingdoms period of China.

== History ==
He was the second son of Guan Yu and a younger brother of Guan Ping.

Little information about Guan Xing is found in historical records. The biography of Guan Yu in the Records of the Three Kingdoms contains only a few lines on Guan Xing. In his youth, Guan Xing was knowledgeable, and Zhuge Liang saw him as an exceptional talent. When he reached adulthood (around 19 years old), he served as an official in Shu Han, including as a Palace Attendant, but died some years later. Guan Xing held the peerage of the Marquis of Hanshou Village (漢壽亭侯), which he inherited from his father. His cause of death was not documented. He had two known sons – Guan Tong (關統) and Guan Yi (關彝).

Guan Xing appears as a character in the 14th-century historical novel Romance of the Three Kingdoms, in which he plays a significant role after the death of his father.

== In Romance of the Three Kingdoms ==
Guan Xing plays a significant role in the 14th-century historical novel Romance of the Three Kingdoms, which romanticises the historical events before and during the Three Kingdoms period of China.

In Chapter 81, Guan Xing competes with Zhang Bao, Zhang Fei's son, for the position of leading the vanguard force just before the Battle of Yiling. However, Liu Bei stops them and orders them to become oath brothers in the same manner he did with their fathers many years ago. The two of them then join Wu Ban, who leads the vanguard force into battle.

In Chapter 83, Guan Xing slays Pan Zhang, the Wu general who captured his father during the Wu invasion of Jing Province, and retrieves his father's weapon, the Green Dragon Crescent Blade. Later, he executes Mi Fang and Fu Shiren before an altar dedicated to Guan Yu.

In Chapter 91, Guan Xing serves as Commander of the Left Guard (帳前左護衛使) and Prancing Dragon General (龍驤將軍) in the Shu army. He follows Zhuge Liang on the Northern Expeditions against Shu's rival state Wei. He dies of illness in Chapter 102.

== In popular culture ==
Guan Xing is first introduced as a playable character in the eighth instalment of Koei's Dynasty Warriors video game series.

Guan Xing's appointment and the Northern Expeditions are depicted in the 2008 film Three Kingdoms: Resurrection of the Dragon.

== See also ==
- Lists of people of the Three Kingdoms
