= Mulu, Maragheh =

Mulu مولو
- Village
- Location within Iran
- Coordinates: 37°07′33″N 46°30′43″E
- Country: Iran
- Province: East Azerbaijan
- County: Maragheh
- Bakhsh: Saraju
- Rural District: Quri Chay-ye Gharbi

Population (2006)
  - Total: 151
- Time zone: UTC+3:30 (IRST)
  - Summer (DST): UTC+4:30 (IRDT)

Mulu (Persian: مولو, also Romanized as Mūlū) is a village in Quri Chay-ye Gharbi Rural District, Saraju District, Maragheh County, East Azerbaijan Province, Iran. At the 2006 census, its population was 151, in 25 families.
