= Lady Zhurong =

Fictional character from the novel Romance of the Three Kingdoms

Zhurong
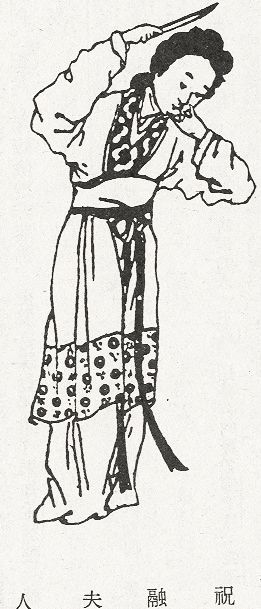
- A Qing dynasty illustration of Lady Zhurong
- Traditional Chinese: 祝融
- Simplified Chinese: 祝融
Transcriptions
Standard Mandarin
- Hanyu Pinyin: Zhù Róng
- Wade–Giles: Chu-jung

Lady Zhurong, sometimes referred to as Madam Zhurong, is a fictional character in the 14th-century Chinese historical novel Romance of the Three Kingdoms. She is the wife of the Nanman chieftain Meng Huo, who rules the lands in the Nanzhong region of the state of Shu Han during the Three Kingdoms period of China. She claims descent from the Chinese fire deity Zhurong, from whom she acquires her name. Zhurong is the only woman in the novel who participates in fighting and battles against Shu forces alongside her husband.

In the Beijing opera Dragon and Phoenix Headgear (龍鳳巾), Zhurong and Meng Huo have a daughter named Huaman.

== In Romance of the Three Kingdoms ==
After her husband is defeated by the Shu general Ma Dai, Lady Zhurong goes to battle and leads her troops to attack a unit of soldiers from Shu. She uses flying daggers and manages to capture the Shu officers Zhang Ni and Ma Zhong.

The following day, Zhurong engages Zhao Yun and Wei Yan in battle but both of them quickly flee from the battlefield. She suspects that it is a trap and does not go after them. When the same events happen again the next day, Zhurong still does not pursue them. However, after Wei Yan turns back and taunts her, she pursues him into a narrow valley where she falls into a trap and gets captured by the Shu forces.

Zhurong is brought back to the Shu camp, where she is treated well on Zhuge Liang's order. Zhuge Liang offers her a drink and frees her from her bonds. He then sends a messenger to meet Meng Huo and propose releasing Zhurong in exchange for Zhang Ni and Ma Zhong. Meng Huo agrees so Zhurong returns to her husband.

Zhurong is captured another two times by Shu's forces. The last time she is captured, she marches alongside her husband and their army to finish off Shu's army as they have been falsely informed that their ally Wutugu's army has nearly obliterated Shu's forces. However, much to their dismay, Shu's forces have actually routed Wutugu's army, and then they proceed to capture Zhurong.

After finally surrendering and pledging their allegiance to Shu, Meng Huo and Zhurong are released to continue their rule over the Nanzhong region. They never rebel against Shu again.

== In popular culture ==
- Lady Zhurong appears as a playable character in Koei's Dynasty Warriors and Warriors Orochi video game series. She is referred to as "Zhu Rong" in most of the games, with the exception of Warriors Orochi 3 and its expansions.
- In the collectible card game Magic: The Gathering, there is a card named "Lady Zhurong, Warrior Queen" in the Portal Three Kingdoms set.
- Lady Zhurong appears as a playable general in the Nanman DLC for Total War: Three Kingdoms strategy video game.

== See also ==
- Zhurong
- Lists of people of the Three Kingdoms
- List of fictional people of the Three Kingdoms
