= Bao Sanniang =

Fictional character

- Traditional Chinese: 鮑三娘
- Simplified Chinese: 鲍三娘
- Literal meaning: Third Lady Bao
Transcriptions
Standard Mandarin
- Hanyu Pinyin: Bào Sānniáng

Bao Sanniang is a fictional character who appears primarily in Chinese opera and plays about the Three Kingdoms period of China. She is usually portrayed as a brave woman warrior and as the wife of Guan Suo, a fictitious son of Guan Yu. Proud of her warrior training, she refused marriage until he defeated her in a duel. Although there is no evidence of her existence, there is a tomb and a statue in Guangyuan, Sichuan that was built for her.

== Fictional biography ==
Bao Sanniang was the third daughter of Bao Yuanwai. She lived in the Bao Clan Village in Sichuan. Lian Kang came to marry Bao Sanniang but she refused. He then attacked the hamlet and seized her, but Bao Sanniang fought back. After this the Bao family attacked and seized the Nanshan region, Lian Kang who was the area chief was executed.

Guan Suo was on a journey with his father Guan Yu when he heard about the fall of Lian Kang. Guan Suo learned that a warrior woman was one of the main responsible for the defeat of Lian Kang and wanted to challenge her to a duel. They fought several times before she was knocked off her horse and defeated. Charmed by the first opponent that bested her and knowing of her opponent's heritage, she proposed a marriage and Guan Suo accepted due to her beauty and courageous spirit. After their marriage was accepted by Liu Bei, Bao Sanniang was awarded with a permanent position in the army ranks, a position which she was said to have loyally followed.

In 219 Guan Yu was killed by Eastern Wu in the Battle of Fancheng. Guan Suo and Bao Sanniang fled to the territory of the Bao family. To avenge the death of Guan Yu, Liu Bei marched with his troops against Sun Quan at the Battle of Xiaoting. Liu Bei suffered a humiliating defeat and died months later in disgrace.

After hearing this, Bao Sanniang and Guan Suo prepared to return to Cheng Du. Guan Suo introduced himself to Zhuge Liang thus:

After the fall of Jingzhou, I was hidden by the Bao family from where I wanted to go to the River Lands to ask the First Ruler for revenge for my father. But I fell ill, which was long and severe, and I only just recovered. I was then travelling towards Chengdu to meet with the Latter Ruler when I met the army in the south expedition. I know that vengeance has been taken upon the murderers of my father. And now I want to present myself to the Prime Minister.

At this time Zhuge Liang was about to start a military campaign. Seeing the two young military commanders, Guan Suo and Bao Sanniang, Zhuge Liang ordered that they both participate in the Invasion at Nanzhong. The military commander ordered the two of them not to give up, in order to do their duty, Guan Suo and Bao Sanniang bade each other in tears for the last time. Bao Sanniang was stationed at the gate and defended then of the fierce attack of Meng Huo army. She has the courage to make a plan and keeps Meng You busy at the castle doors for Guan Suo to advance against the main field of the enemy.

Both Bao Sanniang and Guan So fought bravely in many battles. Guan Suo ends up dying in one such battle. After learning of her husband's death, instead of crying, Bao Sanniang guarded the Jiameng pass until her death.

== In popular culture ==
Bao Sanniang appears in the 11th installment of Koei's Romance of the Three Kingdoms video game series. She is also introduced as a new playable character in the seventh installment of Koei's Dynasty Warriors series, as well as in the spin-off game Warriors Orochi 3.

== See also ==
- Lists of people of the Three Kingdoms
- List of fictional people of the Three Kingdoms
