= Muli, Kermanshah =

Muli مولی
- Village
- Location within Iran
- Coordinates: 33°51′34″N 47°17′59″E
- Country: Iran
- Province: Kermanshah
- County: Kermanshah
- Bakhsh: Firuzabad
- Rural District: Osmanvand

Population (2006)
  - Total: 26
- Time zone: UTC+3:30 (IRST)
  - Summer (DST): UTC+4:30 (IRDT)

Muli (Persian: مولی, also Romanized as Mūlī; also known as Mūlū) is a village in Osmanvand Rural District, Firuzabad District, Kermanshah County, Kermanshah Province, Iran. At the 2006 census, its population was 26, in 6 families.
