= Guan Suo =

Fictional Chinese character

- Traditional Chinese: 關索
- Simplified Chinese: 关索
Transcriptions
Standard Mandarin
- Hanyu Pinyin: Guān Suǒ
- Wade–Giles: Kuan^{1} Suo^{3}

Guan Suo is a fictional character of the Three Kingdoms period of China. He is often depicted as the third son of the general Guan Yu. He is not mentioned in historical records, and appears only in folk tales and in the historical novel Romance of the Three Kingdoms. He was said to have served in the state of Shu Han as a military general.

== In folklore and literature ==
Many tales about him were passed down in the form of folk culture instead of textual works. In the 14th-century historical novel Romance of the Three Kingdoms, Guan Suo was described as a capable warrior, and was involved in Zhuge Liang's Southern Campaign against the Nanman.

Guan Suo is described to be very popular among the girls because of his handsome appearance. In a Chinese opera play, Guan Suo Play (關索戲), he was described as a man "seven chi tall, with a face like a peach blossom" (身長七尺，面似桃花).

In some stories, he has many wives. The first is called Bao Sanniang, followed by Wang Linggong's (王令公) two daughters Wang Yue (王悦) and Wang Tao (王桃), and the fourth one is Huaman (花鬘), a fictional daughter of Meng Huo.

In folk tales, Guan Suo has another name – "Hua Guan Suo" (花關索), which literally means "Flower Guan Suo". It is said that Guan Suo used this name before he met his father Guan Yu. "Hua" was the family name of his martial arts master Hua Yue (花月/花岳) in Banshidong (班石洞), Mount Qiuqu (丘衢山).

Sources such as Genealogy of the Guan Family (關氏家譜), Guang Yi Si Dian (廣義祀典) and Kaozheng on the Holy Emperor's Genealogy (聖帝世系考證) claim that Guan Suo's courtesy name was Weizhi (維之).

== In popular culture ==
Yang Xiong, a fictional character in the classical novel Water Margin, was nicknamed "Sick Guan Suo" because he resembles Guan in appearance, but has a lighter skin tone.

Guan Suo is featured as a playable character in the seventh instalment of Koei's Dynasty Warriors video game series.

== See also ==
- Lists of people of the Three Kingdoms
- List of fictional people of the Three Kingdoms

== Sources ==
- Luo, Guanzhong (14th century). Romance of the Three Kingdoms (Sanguo Yanyi), Chapter 87.
