= Guan Ping =

Chinese general serving warlord Liu Bei (died 220)

Guan Ping 關平
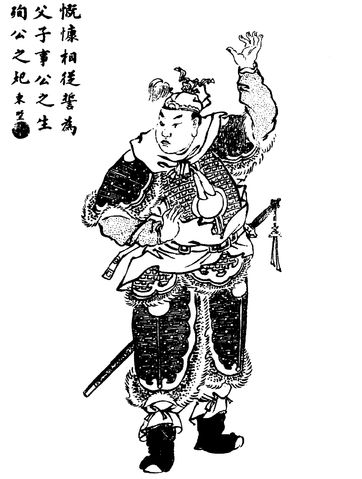
- A Qing dynasty illustration of Guan Ping
- Died: January or February 220 (Note: The Zizhi Tongjian recorded that Guan Yu was captured and executed in the 12th month of the 24th year of the Jian'an era of the reign of Emperor Xian of Han. This month corresponds to 23 January to 21 February 220 in the Gregorian calendar.); Nanzhang County, Hubei
- Occupation: General
- Father: Guan Yu
- Relatives: Guan Xing (brother); Lady Guan

Guan Ping (died January or February 220) was a Chinese military general serving under the warlord Liu Bei during the late Eastern Han dynasty. He was executed with his father Guan Yu by Sun Quan's forces.

== Life ==
Guan Ping was the eldest son of Guan Yu. Little about him is documented in historical records except that he was captured along with his father west of Maicheng (麦城, southeast of present-day Dangyang, Hubei) by the forces of Sun Quan sometime between 23 January and 21 February 220. They were executed in Linju (臨沮; in present-day Nanzhang County, Xiangyang, Hubei) later.

== In Romance of the Three Kingdoms ==
Guan Ping appears in the 14th-century historical novel Romance of the Three Kingdoms by Luo Guanzhong. In the novel, he is portrayed as the adopted son of Guan Yu, rather than his biological son as he was historically. He is the second son of Guan Ding (關定), a farmer. His elder brother is Guan Ning (關寧). Guan Yu encounters Guan Ding and his family during his journey across five passes to find Liu Bei. He is so impressed with Guan Ping at first sight that he accepts him as his foster son. During the Battle of Runan, Guan Ping, Guan Yu and Zhou Cang lead 300 men to rescue Liu Bei, who is under attack by Cao Cao's general Zhang He. Guan Ping participates in some of Liu Bei's subsequent military exploits, including the Battle of Bowang against Cao Cao's general Xiahou Dun, and the Yi Province campaign against Liu Zhang. Later, he is relocated to Jing Province to join his foster father in defending Liu Bei's territories in Jing Province. In 219, Guan Ping follows Guan Yu to the Battle of Fancheng and scores some initial victories over Cao Cao's forces, including flooding seven enemy armies. However, in the meantime, Sun Quan (Liu Bei's ally) secretly breaks the alliance and sends his general Lü Meng to attack and conquer Jing Province in a stealth invasion. Guan Yu is completely caught off guard and eventually isolated in Maicheng with a fraction of his remaining forces. While trying to break out of the siege, Guan Yu and Guan Ping are captured in an ambush by Sun Quan's forces. Sun Quan tries to persuade them to surrender, but they refuse so Sun has them executed.

== In popular culture ==
=== Religion ===
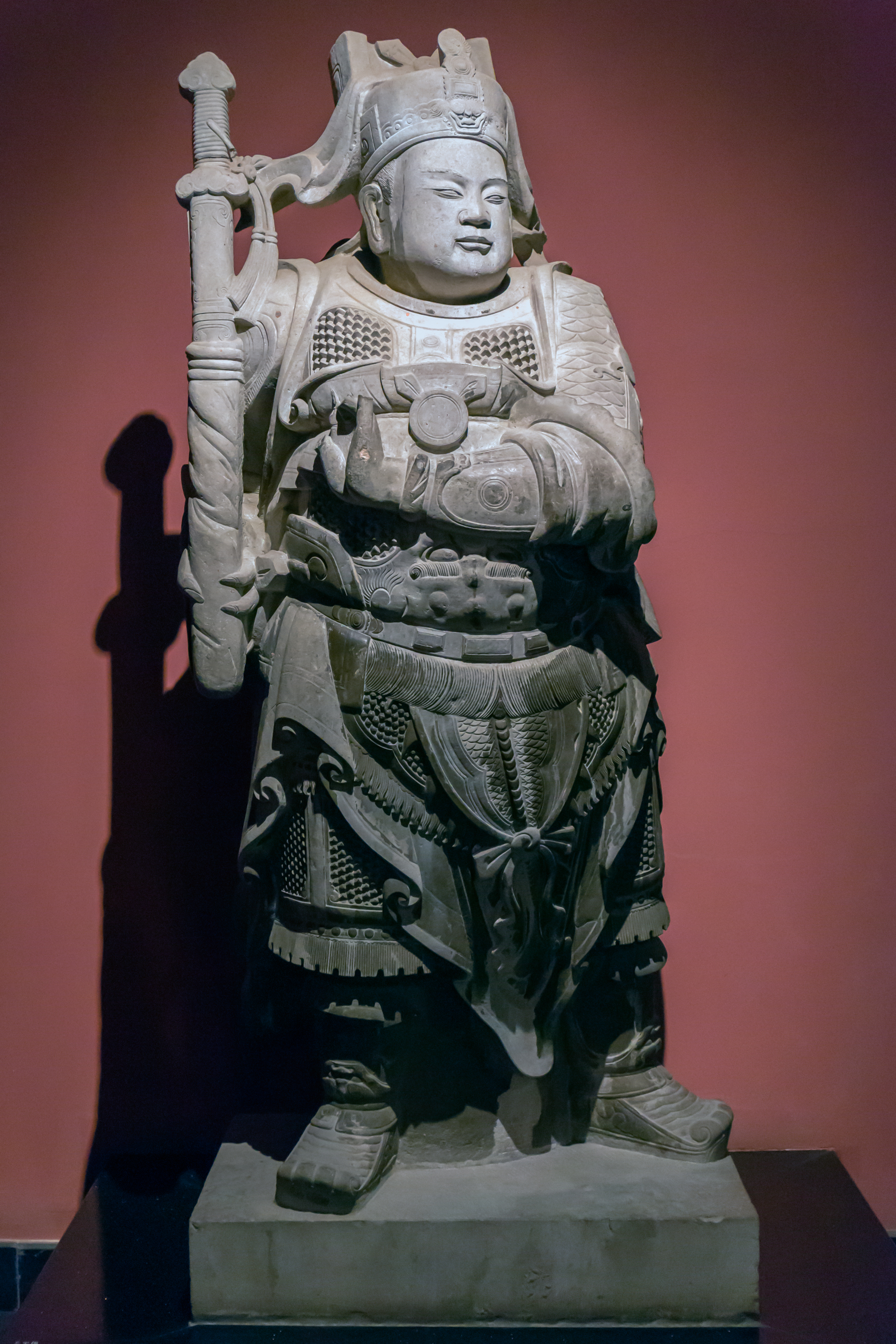
Statue of Guan Ping in the Stele Forest in Beilin District, Xi'an

Guan Ping sometimes appears as a door god in Chinese and Taoist temples in partnership with Guan Yu. He also sometimes accompanies Guan Yu in his role as a war god, sometimes in combination with Zhou Cang and Liao Hua. Guan Ping's face is traditionally painted white, while Zhou Cang is black and Guan Yu red.

=== Video games ===
Guan Ping appears as a playable character in Koei's Dynasty Warriors and Warriors Orochi video game series. He was left out of Total War: Three Kingdoms, though he does appear in certain mods for the game.

== See also ==
- Lists of people of the Three Kingdoms
