= Meng Huo =

3rd century tribal leader in the Nanzhong region

- 孟獲
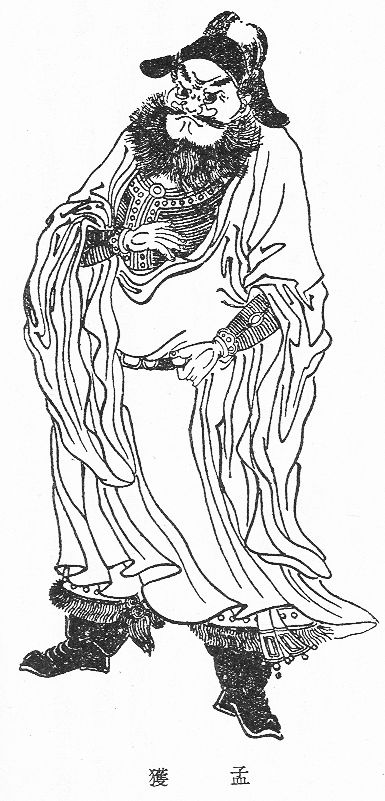
- A Qing dynasty illustration of Meng Huo

Assistant to the Imperial Counsellor (御史中丞)
- In office ?–?
- Monarch: Liu Shan

Personal details
- Born: Unknown
- Died: Unknown

Meng Huo (fl. 210s–220s) was a local leader in the Nanzhong region in the state of Shu Han during the Three Kingdoms period of China. He was popularly depicted as a local leader representing the gentries of the Nanzhong region, but some historians doubt his historical existence.

Meng Huo's popular image comes from the 14th-century historical novel Romance of the Three Kingdoms, which romanticises the events before and during the Three Kingdoms period. The novel portrays Meng Huo as a southern barbarian tribal leader. He also marries the fictional Lady Zhurong, who claims descent from the fire deity Zhurong. In the Beijing Opera "Dragon and Phoenix Headgear" Zhurong and Meng Huo has a daughter named Huaman.

== Historical sources ==
Meng Huo and the record of his captures appeared in both the Han Jin Chunqiu, written by Xi Zuochi in the Eastern Jin dynasty and also in the near-contemporary Chronicles of Huayang written between 348 and 354 by Chang Qu. Therefore, two historical documents of different origins and known for reliability recorded events involving Meng Huo. The Liu Song historian Pei Songzhi included Xi Zuochi's account without comment in his annotations to Chen Shou's Records of the Three Kingdoms. The historian Sima Guang, when compiling the Zizhi Tongjian, also recorded events involving Meng Huo.

However due to Pei Songzhi's criticism of Xi Zuochi on other parts of his work, the historian Fang Guoyu (方國瑜) used Pei's doubts on Xi's unreliability to challenge the story of Meng Huo's seven captures. However, Fang did not go as far as to doubt Meng Huo's existence.

The absurdity of Meng Huo being captured and released seven times led many to doubt the story, and even of Meng Huo's existence. The Republican-era historian Zhang Hualan (張華爛) wrote in his article "Discussion on Meng Huo" (孟獲辯) that Meng was a fictional character invented by later historians, noting that the name "Huo" (獲), which means "captured" in Chinese, is too coincidental, considering Meng's fate on being captured – a view shared by many academics.

A contrary example of this argument could be made with the given name of Liu Bei and Liu Shan. Bei (備) which means "to prepare" and Shan (禪) which means "to give" in Chinese. Just as with Meng Huo, those indicate what happened. Liu Bei prepared his kingdom and Liu Shan gave it, as noted by Qiao Zhou. Yet, those individuals are definitely not fictional. Furthermore, it is unclear if Meng Huo was of Chinese descendent or from foreign tribes. If it was the latter, then his name may have sounded similar as "Huo" (獲) and therefore was transcribed as such.

Huang Chengzhong (黃承宗) of the Liangshan Yi Slave Society Museum believes Meng to be a real historical figure, though he is certain that the "seven times freed" story is fiction.

Sichuan University professor Miao Yue (繆鉞) contended Zhuge Liang would not be able to release the leader if the latter was indeed captured. Tan Liangxiao (譚良嘯), director of the Zhuge Liang Memorial Temple in Chengdu, also stated the "seven times freed" story to be "strange and unbelievable", but like Fang and Huang, he believes Meng Huo did exist in history.

== Life ==
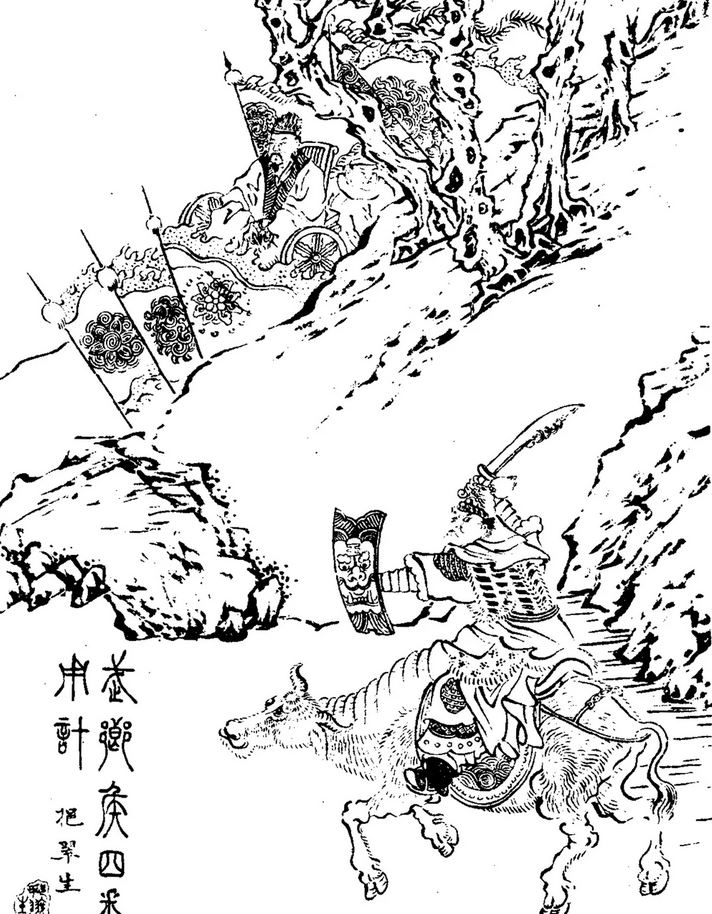
Meng Huo riding into battle on his red ox

When the Shu Han emperor Liu Bei died in 223 CE, the local people of Nanzhong rebelled against Shu Han, stating that there were three lords claiming to be the legitimate ruler of China and they no longer knew whom they should pledge allegiance to. In retaliation, the Shu Han chancellor Zhuge Liang launched an invasion on the Nanzhong region and successfully quelled the uprising.

At the beginning of the rebellion, when Yong Kai (雍闓) saw that many people were still indecisive about this course of action. He had Meng Huo from Jianning Commandery (建寧) sent to persuade the Sou (叟) and other tribes. Meng Huo proclaimed to all of them that the government was making excessive demands of rare resources that is difficult to acquire in large numbers. The tribe people believed him and so they rejoined Yong Kai back.

After Yong Kai's death, Meng Huo replaced him as the leader of the rebellion. During the summer, Zhuge Liang led his army and crossed the Lu River and advanced toward Yizhou Commandery (益州). He captured Meng Huo then had him brought into his camp and asked him what did he think of his army. Meng Huo answered to him "I have regrets for if I knew this earlier, I would have easily defeated you."

Zhuge Liang thought that if he wanted to concentrate all his efforts in the campaigns to the north, he would have to find tricks and ways to subdue the tribes of Nanzhong since they were often in rebellion and causing chaos. So he forgave Meng Huo and had him sent back to his army. After this, the two armies fought each other seven times, Meng Huo was always captured by Zhuge Liang and he was always forgiven and released. All of this caused Meng Huo along with the tribal people and Han citizens to reconsider their rebellion and to sincerely submit. When Zhuge Liang saw Meng Huo arrived, he asked him what were his intentions. Meng Huo replied that he considered Zhuge Liang as the "scourge of Heaven" and never again would the people of the south dare to revolt.

After the rebellion, many talented people of the south joined the Shu Han government. Meng Huo was one of them and became a subordinate of Zhuge Liang. His highest office was Assistant to the Imperial Counsellor (御史中丞).

== In Romance of the Three Kingdoms ==
Extracts from the 14th-century historical novel Romance of the Three Kingdoms about Meng Huo:

Chapter 87

- "In the third year of Jianxing, a bulletin came to Yi Province announcing, "Meng Huo has led 100,000 Nanman tribesmen across our borders to plunder the villages.""
- "Despite protest from Court Councillor Wang Lian, Zhuge Liang leaves to lead 500,000 soldiers against the southern forces."
- "The Shu forces were led by Zhuge Liang. Zhao Yun and Wei Yan were his generals, their lieutenants being Wang Ping and Zhang Ni."
- "Meng Huo speaks to Zhuge Liang, "The whole of the riverlands once belonged to another. Your lord seized it by force and proclaimed himself emperor. My ancestors held these lands, which you have encroached upon so barbarically.""

Chapter 88

- "Zhuge Liang captures and frees Meng Huo: "I can catch him again with ease whenever I choose to. But pacification of the south requires that we subdue the hearts of the Nanman people.""
- "During the conquest, Meng Huo was captured on seven different occasions, by Zhuge Liang. In addition, many Nanman generals and lieutenants were captured and treated with kindness. This caused many withdrawals and eventually the pacification of the south."

Chapter 90

- Zhuge Liang: "I guessed the enemy would be looking for an ambush in the woods, so I set up decoy banners there to confuse them. There were never any troops. Next, I had Wei Yan lose a series of battles to strengthen their confidence... I ordered Ma Dai to deploy the black wagons in the valley - they had been loaded earlier with fire launchers called 'earth thunder', each containing nine missiles... We cut off the road and burned out the enemy...""
- "Finally, Meng Huo admits defeat: "Seven times captured, seven times freed! Such a thing has never happened! Though I stand beyond the range of imperial grace, I am not utterly ignorant of ritual, of what propriety and honour require. No, I am not so shameless!" He then stripped off one of his sleeves (a sign of swearing oath) and pledged: "By the Chancellor's celestial might, the Southerners will never rebel again.""

== Legacy ==
The Yi considered Meng Huo one of their rulers and called him Mot Hop (Yi language: ꂽꉼ).

Meng Huo is featured as a playable character in Koei's Dynasty Warriors and Warriors Orochi video game series. He leads his own playable faction in The Furious Wild DLC for the strategy video game, Total War: Three Kingdoms.

== See also ==
- Lists of people of the Three Kingdoms
