= Lü Kai =

Chinese Shu Han official (died 225)

- 呂凱
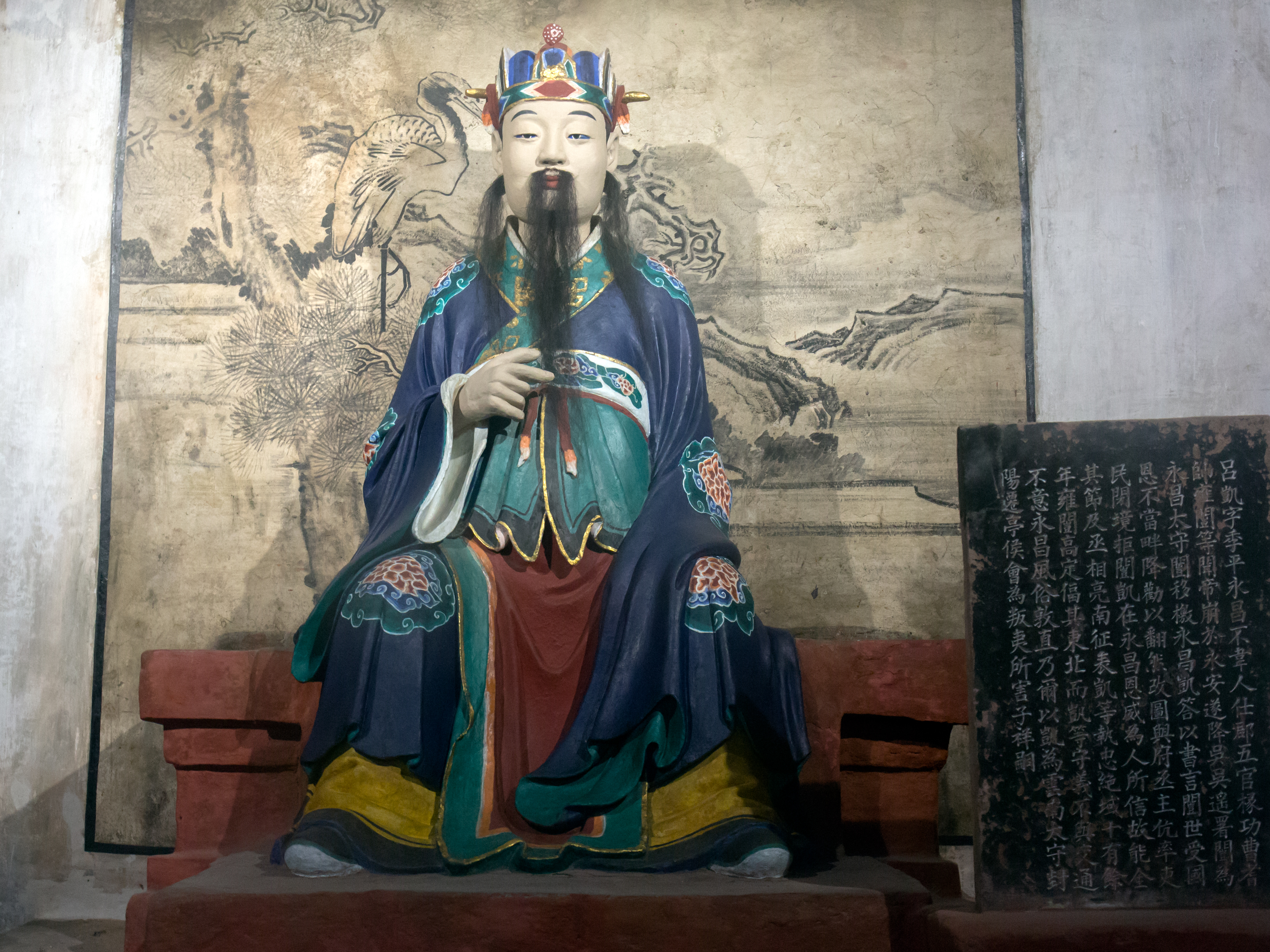
- Statue of Lü Kai in a temple in Chengdu, Sichuan

Administrator of Yunnan (雲南太守)
- In office 225 – 225
- Monarch: Liu Shan
- Chancellor: Zhuge Liang

Personal details
- Born: Unknown; Baoshan, Yunnan
- Died: 225; Yunnan
- Children: Lü Xiang
- Occupation: Official
- Courtesy name: Jiping (季平)
- Peerage: Marquis of Yangqian Village (陽遷亭侯)

Lü Kai (died 225), courtesy name Jiping, was an official of the state of Shu Han during the Three Kingdoms period of China.

== Background ==
Lü Kai was from Buwei County (不韋縣), Yongchang Commandery (永昌郡), which is located northeast of present-day Baoshan, Yunnan. He was allegedly from the same clan as Lü Buwei, a statesman of the Qin state in the Warring States period who was exiled to the Shu region (present-day Sichuan) after his fall from power. (Note: During Emperor Wu's reign in the Western Han dynasty, the Han Empire expanded its boundaries southward and established commanderies and counties in present-day Sichuan and Yunnan. Around this time, the Han government relocated Lü Buwei's descendants to what was to become Buwei County and named the county after their ancestor.)

== Service in Shu Han ==
Lü Kai started his career as an Officer of Merit (功曹) in the bureau for general purposes in Yongchang Commandery's office.

After Liu Bei, the founding emperor of the Shu Han (or Shu) state, died in June 223, Yong Kai (雍闓), a tribal chief active in Shu's Nanzhong region (covering parts of present-day Yunnan, Guizhou and southern Sichuan), became more aggressive and rebellious towards the Shu state. During this time, the Shu general Li Yan wrote a total of six letters to Yong Kai to dissuade him from rebelling but only received an arrogant response from the latter. Yong Kai also pledged allegiance to Shu's ally-turned-rival state Eastern Wu (or Wu); in return, the Wu ruler Sun Quan appointed him as the Administrator of Yongchang Commandery (永昌郡; covering parts of present-day western Yunnan) even though Yongchang was under Shu control.

Yongchang Commandery was located in the far southwest of Shu and was rather isolated from the Shu imperial capital, Chengdu, because the connecting roads were usually difficult to travel on or totally untraversable. When Yong Kai showed up to take control of Yongchang, Lü Kai and his colleague Wang Kang (王伉) refused to recognise his legitimacy and led both the local government and civilians alike to resist Yong Kai and prevent him from entering the commandery.

When Yong Kai repeatedly wrote declarations in his attempt to convince everyone that he was the rightful Administrator of Yongchang Commandery, Lü Kai wrote a reply to him as follows:

"Heaven has brought us disaster and chaos. Warlords rise up and fight for power. The whole Empire feels resentful and sad. Everyone, regardless of their status, strives to do their best to save the Empire and prepares to sacrifice their lives if necessary. General, you and your family have received grace from the Han dynasty for generations. I thought that you would gather your followers and take the lead in doing your part to repay the emperors' kindness. By doing so, you would not disgrace your ancestors and would also leave your good name in history. Yet, you pledge allegiance to Wu and betray your roots. In the past, Shun worked hard to serve the people and died in Cangwu. History remembers him for his great deeds. He was buried in Jiangpu. What a pity! Kings Wen and Wu received the Mandate of Heaven, but their ambitions were only realised in King Cheng's time. The Previous Emperor rose up, gained support from throughout the Empire, and had brilliant and wise subjects serving under him. This was a sign that Heaven had bestowed his Empire with peace and prosperity. General, you fail to learn lessons from history and foresee your doom. Think of wildfires consuming grass plains and people crossing a frozen river. When the flames die out and the ice melts, what will you have to rely on? Your ancestor, the Marquis Yong, was an enemy of the Han dynasty but the Han dynasty still made him a marquis. Dou Rong knew that the Eastern Han dynasty would rise, so he pledged allegiance to Shizu and left his good name in history and let later generations sing praises of him. As of now, Imperial Chancellor Zhuge is exceptionally talented and perceptive. Since the Previous Emperor entrusted him with taking care of the Emperor, he has done well in bringing prosperity to the State. He does not take sides in quarrels between his subordinates, and he generously gives due credit to people regardless of what wrongs they did in the past. General, if you can recognise your mistake and be willing to mend your ways, I think it will not be difficult for you to leave your good name in history like the great men before you. By then, would you still want to govern only a small commandery like Yongchang? I heard that when Chu state showed disrespect towards the Zhou dynasty, Duke Huan of Qi admonished Chu for their behaviour; when Fuchai tried to become a hegemon, the Jin state thwarted his attempt. The lord you currently serve is not a good lord, so why would people want to submit to you? I always bear in mind the teachings of the ancients, and remind myself that I, as a subject of the State, should have no dealings with traitors like you. That was why I did not respond to all your previous attempts to contact me. However, after receiving your declarations, I decided to give you a piece of my mind. I hope that you, General, will think through this carefully."

As the people of Yongchang Commandery highly regarded and trusted him, Lü Kai was able to maintain control over Yongchang and fulfil his loyalty as a subject of Shu.

In the spring of 225, the Shu regent Zhuge Liang led an army on a southern campaign into the Nanzhong region to quell the rebellions and deal with intrusions by the Nanman tribes. While the Shu army was on its way, Yong Kai was slain by the subordinates of Gao Ding (高定), another rebel leader.

By the autumn of 225, Zhuge Liang had completely pacified Nanzhong and restored peace in the area. He then wrote a memorial to the Shu emperor Liu Shan as follows: "Lü Kai, Wang Kang and other officials in Yongchang Commandery maintained their loyalty towards the State despite being stuck in a remote location for over 10 years. When Yong Kai and Gao Ding started rebellions in the northeast, Lü Kai stood by their allegiance to the State and refused to have any dealings with the rebels. I am so surprised that there exists such a culture of loyalty and righteousness here in Yongchang."

Lü Kai was later appointed as the Administrator of Yunnan Commandery (雲南郡; covering parts of present-day Chuxiong, Dali and Lijiang in Yunnan), and enfeoffed as the Marquis of Yangqian Village (陽遷亭侯). Lü Kai's colleague, Wang Kang (王伉), later became the Administrator of Yongchang Commandery and was also enfeoffed as a village marquis.

== Death and legacy ==
Lü Kai was killed by insurgents in Yunnan Commandery. His son, Lü Xiang (呂祥), inherited his peerage as the Marquis of Yangqian Village. Lü Xiang served under the Jin dynasty after the end of the Three Kingdoms period and held the position of Colonel of the Southern Barbarians (南夷校尉). His son and descendants served as the Administrator of Yongchang Commandery generation after generation.

In the fourth century, when Li Xiong, the founder of the Cheng state, led his forces to invade Ning Prefecture (寧州; covering present-day Yunnan and Guizhou), Lü Kai's descendants refused to surrender and led the people of Yongchang Commandery to resist the invaders.

== Appraisal ==
Chen Shou, who wrote Lu Kai's biography in the Records of the Three Kingdoms (Sanguozhi), appraised him as follows: "Lu Kai never differed of his path to integrity... Along with Huang Quan, Li Hui, Ma Zhong, Wang Ping, Zhang Ni, It was thanks to their qualities that they were all well known through the empire and because they seized the opportunity given to them that they left strong legacies."

== See also ==
- Lists of people of the Three Kingdoms
