= Li Hui (Three Kingdoms) =

Chinese official of the Shu Han state (died 231)

- 李恢

Administrator of Jianning (建寧太守)
- In office 229 – 231
- Monarch: Liu Shan
- Chancellor: Zhuge Liang

General Who Safeguards Han (安漢將軍)
- In office 225 – 231
- Monarch: Liu Shan
- Chancellor: Zhuge Liang

Inspector of Jiao Province (交州刺史) (nominal)
- In office 221 – 229
- Monarch: Liu Bei / Liu Shan
- Chancellor: Zhuge Liang

Area Commander of Laixiang (庲降都督)
- In office 221 – 231
- Monarch: Liu Bei / Liu Shan
- Chancellor: Zhuge Liang
- Preceded by: Deng Fang
- Succeeded by: Zhang Yi

Personal details
- Born: Unknown; Chengjiang County, Yunnan
- Died: 231; Hanzhong, Shaanxi
- Relations: Li Qiu (nephew)
- Children: Li Yi
- Occupation: Military general, politician
- Courtesy name: De'ang (德昂)
- Peerage: Marquis of Hanxing Village (漢興亭侯)

Li Hui (died 231), courtesy name De'ang, was a Chinese military general and politician of the state of Shu Han during the Three Kingdoms period of China. After refusing Liu Zhang's service, Li joined Liu Bei early in his campaign to pacify Yi province. After Liu Bei's death, Li Hui proved his talents during Zhuge Liang's Southern Campaign and was appointed the area commander in the south. He set the standard for his successors, such as Ma Zhong, for sound governance. After Shu-Han's co-regent Li Yan was removed from office, Li Hui was promoted again and sent to Hanzhong to assist in the Northern Expeditions but died a year later.

== Early career ==
Li Hui was born during the late Eastern Han dynasty in Yuyuan County (俞元縣), Jianning Commandery (建寧郡), which is present-day Chengjiang County, Yunnan. He started his career as a local inspector (督郵) in his native Jianning Commandery. His aunt married Cuan Xi (爨習), (Note: The Chronicles of Huayang recorded that Cuan Xi later served as a military officer in the state of Shu during the Three Kingdoms period following Zhuge Liang's Southern Campaign.) who served as the Prefect of Jianling County (建伶縣; present-day Jinning District, Kunming, Yunnan). When Cuan Xi committed an offence, Li Hui got implicated in the case because of his relationship to Cuan Xi and ended up being removed from office. However, Dong He, the Administrator of Yizhou Commandery (a.k.a. Jianning 建寧), considered that Cuan Xi wielded great influence in the commandery and decided to drop the case, so Li Hui was restored to office.

Around 212, (Note: The conflict between Liu Bei and Liu Zhang started in 212.) Dong He then recommended Li Hui as a talent to Liu Zhang, the Governor of Yi Province, and sent him to the provincial capital Chengdu. During his journey to Chengdu, Li Hui heard that the warlord Liu Bei had led his forces from Jiameng Pass (葭萌關; in present-day Zhaohua District, Guangyuan, Sichuan) to attack Liu Zhang.

== Service under Liu Bei ==
=== Liu Bei's takeover of Yi Province ===
Li Hui knew that Liu Zhang would lose and Liu Bei would eventually seize control of Yi Province, so he pretended to be a messenger from Jianning Commandery and headed north to join Liu Bei at Mianzhu. Liu Bei was overjoyed to see Li Hui. When they reached Luo County (雒縣; present-day Guanghan, Sichuan), Liu Bei sent Li Hui as his representative to meet the general Ma Chao at Hanzhong Commandery and lead him to Chengdu to force Liu Zhang to surrender to Liu Bei.

After Liu Bei seized control of Chengdu in 214, he declared himself the new Governor of Yi Province and appointed Li Hui as a scribe, registrar and Officer of Merit (功曹). On one occasion, Li Hui was falsely accused of plotting a rebellion, arrested and escorted as a prisoner to see Liu Bei. Liu Bei believed that Li Hui would never rebel against him so he not only freed Li Hui, but also promoted him to the position of an aide-de-camp.

=== As the Area Commander of Laixiang ===
Following the end of the Eastern Han dynasty and start of the Three Kingdoms period in 220, Li Hui served in the state of Shu Han, which Liu Bei established in 221.

In the same year, as Deng Fang, the Area Commander of Laixiang (庲降都督), (Note: "Laixiang" (庲降) refers to the Nanzhong region in southern Shu during the Three Kingdoms period. It covers parts of present-day Yunnan, Guizhou and southern Sichuan provinces. The Area Commander of Laixiang was an appointment established by the Shu government to oversee the region. During the Taishi era (265–274), the Jin dynasty partitioned part of the region to form Ning Province (寧州).) had just died, Liu Bei was eager to find someone to replace him so he asked Li Hui: "Who can replace him?". Li Hui replied: "People's abilities vary from one person to another. That was why Confucius said, 'in his employment of men, he uses them according to their capacity.' When there is a wise ruler, there will be subjects who strive to do their best. During the Battle of Xianling, Zhao Chongguo said, 'none other than me, Your Majesty's old subject.' I humbly overestimate my ability and hope that Your Majesty will consider me." Liu Bei laughed and said: "I already have you in mind."

Liu Bei thus appointed Li Hui as the Area Commander of Laixiang and granted him imperial authority to serve as the nominal Inspector of Jiao Province, which was actually a territory of Shu Han's ally state Eastern Wu. Li Hui's administrative headquarters were at Pingyi County (平夷縣; northeast of present-day Bijie, Guizhou) when he served as the Area Commander of Laixiang.

== Service under Liu Shan ==
=== Nanzhong campaign ===
Following Liu Bei's death in 223, rebellions broke out in three commanderies in the Nanzhong region of southern Shu: Yong Kai (雍闓), Gao Ding (高定) and Zhu Bao (朱褒) rebelled in Jianning (建寧; around present-day Qujing, Yunnan), Yuexi/Yuesui (越巂; around present-day Xichang, Sichuan) and Zangke (牂柯; around present-day Guiyang or Fuquan, Guizhou) commanderies respectively.

In the spring of 225, Zhuge Liang, the Imperial Chancellor and regent of Shu, personally led a military campaign into Nanzhong to deal with the rebels.

During the campaign, Li Hui led a detachment of the Shu army from Pingyi County (平夷縣; northeast of present-day Bijie, Guizhou) to attack Jianning Commandery. When he reached Kunming, however, he lost contact with Zhuge Liang and the main Shu army. The rebels, who had twice as many troops as him, converged on his position and surrounded him. Li Hui then lied to the rebels:

"We have run out of food supplies and we plan to retreat. We also miss our families as we have been away from home for a long time. Now, we finally have our chance to go home. If we can't return to our homes in the north, we will then join you in your rebellion. We are very frank in revealing our intentions to you."

Just as the rebels believed him and lowered their guard, Li Hui seized the opportunity to launch an assault and succeeded in breaking their encirclement. As the rebels retreated and scattered, Li Hui led his troops to attack them and inflicted heavy casualties on the enemy. He then moved south to Panjiang (槃江) to meet up with the Shu general Ma Zhong, who had just defeated Zhu Bao's rebel forces and recaptured Zangke Commandery. Ma Zhong and Li Hui then led their troops to rendezvous with Zhuge Liang and the main Shu army.

By the autumn of 225, the Shu army had pacified all the rebellions in Nanzhong and restored peace in the region. As Li Hui was deemed to have made the greatest contributions during the campaign, he was promoted to the rank of General Who Pacifies Han (安漢將軍) and enfeoffed as the Marquis of Hanxing Village (漢興亭侯).

=== Maintaining the peace in Nanzhong ===
After Zhuge Liang and the Shu army left Nanzhong, some indigenous tribes started another rebellion against Shu rule and killed the military officers in charge of guarding the commanderies in the region. Li Hui personally led government forces to attack the rebels and eliminated them, after which he forced the tribal chiefs to relocate to the Shu capital Chengdu. At the same time, he also made the Sou (叟) and Pu (濮) tribes pay tribute to the Shu government in the form of cattle, horses, gold and silver, rhinoceroses' horns, leather, and other valuable resources. These resources served as sources of funding for Shu's military campaigns against its rival state Wei.

In 229, after Shu reaffirmed its alliance with its ally state Wu and recognised the legitimacy of the Wu emperor Sun Quan, it renounced its earlier claim to Jiao Province and agreed that it was Wu territory. As a result, Li Hui stopped holding the nominal appointment of Inspector of Jiao Province (交州刺史). He was then given a new appointment as the Administrator (太守) of his native Jianning Commandery (建寧郡) and was ordered to relocate to Jianning Commandery's capital at Pingyi County (平夷縣; northeast of present-day Bijie, Guizhou).

Some time later, Li Hui received orders to move north to Hanzhong Commandery. He died there in 231.

== Family ==
Li Hui's son, Li Yi (李遺), inherited his father's peerage and became the next Marquis of Hanxing Village (漢興亭侯).

Li Hui's nephew, Li Qiu (李球), served as a commander of the yulin section of the imperial guards. In 263, during the Wei invasion of Shu, Li Qiu accompanied the Shu general Zhuge Zhan to resist the Wei general Deng Ai at Mianzhu, where he was killed in battle.

== Appraisal ==
Chen Shou, who wrote Li Hui's biography in the Records of the Three Kingdoms (Sanguozhi), appraised him as follows: "Li Hui was seen as brilliant in his will and actions... Along with Huang Quan, Lü Kai, Ma Zhong, Wang Ping, Zhang Ni, It was thanks to their qualities that they were all well known through the empire and because they seized the opportunity given to them that they left strong legacies."

== See also ==
- Lists of people of the Three Kingdoms
