= Ma Zhong =

Ma Zhong may refer to:

- Ma Zhong (馬忠), Chinese military officer who captured Guan Yu in an ambush during Lü Meng's invasion of Jing Province
- Ma Zhong (Shu Han), Chinese general of the Shu Han state in the Three Kingdoms period
