= Wang Ping (Three Kingdoms) =

Shu Han general (died 248)

- 王平
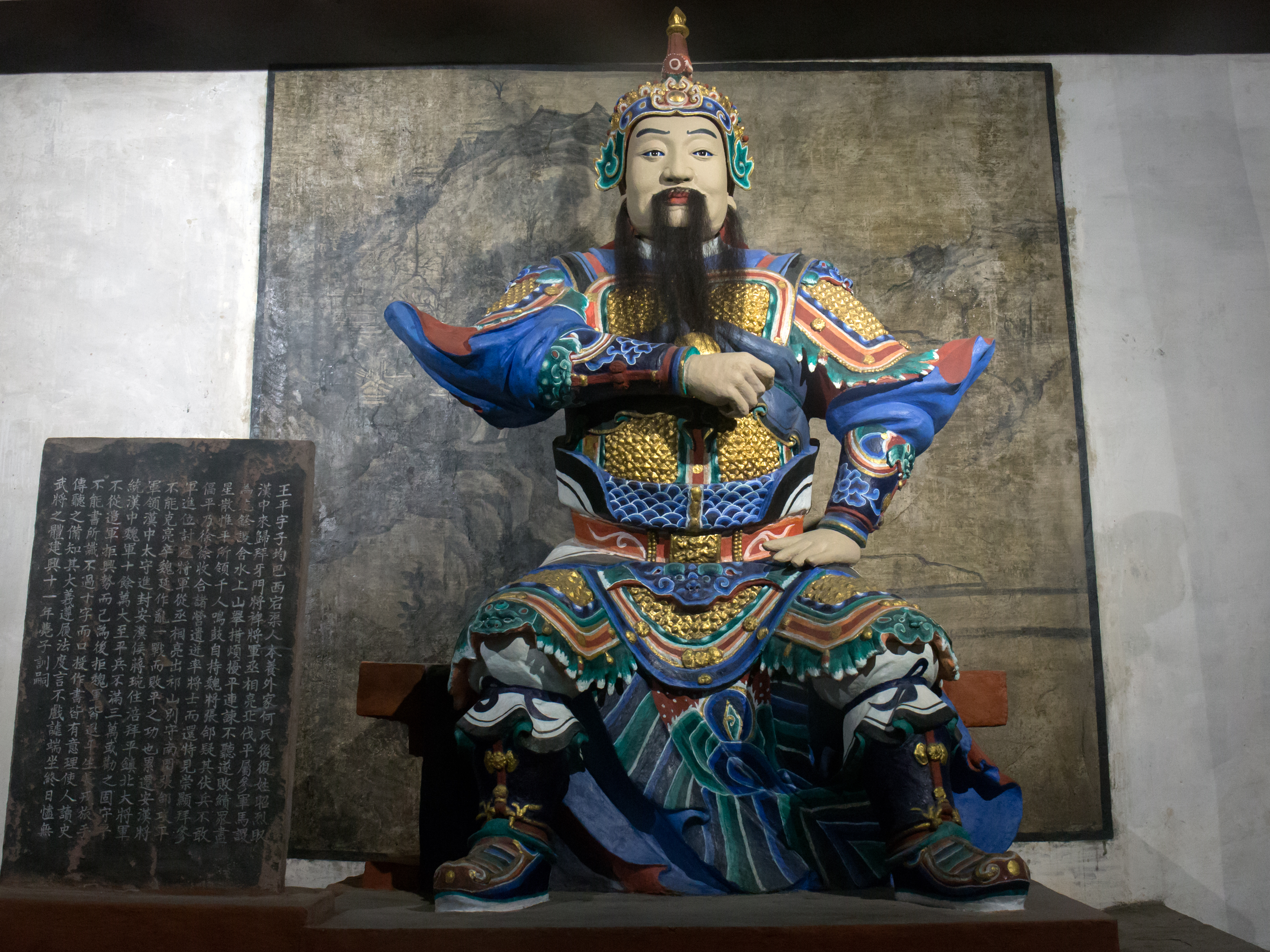
- Statue of Wang Ping in the Zhuge Liang Memorial Temple in Chengdu, Sichuan

Senior General Who Guards the North (鎮北大將軍)
- In office 243 – 248
- Monarch: Liu Shan

Area Commander of Hanzhong (漢中都督)
- In office 243 – 248
- Monarch: Liu Shan
- Succeeded by: Hu Ji
- In office 237 – 238
- Monarch: Liu Shan
- Preceded by: Wu Yi

General Who Pacifies Han (安漢將軍)
- In office 234 – 238
- Monarch: Liu Shan

General Who Attacks Bandits (討寇將軍)
- In office 228 – 234
- Monarch: Liu Shan
- Chancellor: Zhuge Liang

Officer of the Standard (牙門將)
- In office 219 – 228
- Monarch: Liu Bei / Liu Shan

Colonel (校尉)
- In office 215 – 219
- Monarch: Emperor Xian of Han
- Chancellor: Cao Cao

Personal details
- Born: Unknown Qu County, Sichuan
- Died: 248
- Children: Wang Xun
- Occupation: General
- Courtesy name: Zijun (子均)
- Other name: He Ping (何平)
- Peerage: Marquis of Anhan (安漢侯)

Wang Ping (died 248), courtesy name Zijun, was a military general of the state of Shu Han in the Three Kingdoms period of China. Originally a military officer serving under the warlord Cao Cao. In 219, he defected to Cao Cao's rival Liu Bei during the Hanzhong Campaign. Although he was a talented orator, Wang Ping never learned to read because he joined the army at a young age. However, he did not let this disadvantage stop him and had his clerk help him with his reports. Known for his self discipline, he steadily rose through the ranks to become a senior general. During his career, he defeated Zhang He, quelled Wei Yan's alleged rebellion and was the leading commander of the Shu forces during the Battle of Xingshi. The highest position he reached was Senior General Who Guards the North (鎮北大將軍).

== Early life ==
Wang Ping was born in Dangqu County, Baxi Commandery (巴西郡), which is present-day Qu County, Sichuan. A native from the same commandery as another Shu Han general, Ju Fu. He was raised by his maternal family, whose family name was He (何), so he was also known as He Ping. He presumably changed his family name back to Wang in his later years because historical records show no consistency in recording his name. It could also be possible that his name was changed to Wang Ping posthumously.

== Service under Cao Cao ==
Wang Ping started his career under two local tribe leaders, Du Huo (杜濩) and Pu Hu (朴胡). In 215, after the Battle of Yangping, Zhang Lu fled to them for help and better surrendering terms with Cao Cao. After Zhang Lu's surrender, Cao Cao enfeoffed Du Huo and Pu Hu as Marquis with the mission of defending Badong (巴東) and Baxi (巴西) commanderies. However Du Huo and Pu Hu were defeated by Huang Quan and forced to abandon the Ba region. After this, Wang Ping accompanied them to visit the Han imperial court, Luoyang where he was appointed as an acting Colonel (校尉) under Xiahou Yuan.

During the Hanzhong Campaign, Wang Ping fought with Cao Cao's forces to counter Liu Bei's invasion. In 219, Liu Bei killed Xiahou Yuan at the battle of Mount Dingjun, from then on he would occupy the strategic passes, refusing engagement that could jeopardize the campaign and concentrate on a war of attrition against Cao Cao's forces. With each day, more and more of Cao Cao's soldiers would die or desert. Wang Ping was among the latter. Liu Bei welcomed Wang Ping and appointed him as an Officer of the Standard (牙門將) and Major General (裨將軍).

== Service under Shu ==
In 228, when Zhuge Liang, launched the first of a series of military campaigns against Shu's rival state Cao Wei, Wang Ping served as a subordinate of Ma Su, who led the vanguard force to attack the enemy at the Battle of Jieting. As Ma Su's subordinate, Wang Ping advised his superior against camping on top of a hill away from water sources. Although Ma Su rejected Wang Ping's advice, he still put Wang Ping in command of a detachment of troops and let him set up a camp below the hill. As Wang Ping foresaw, the Wei general Zhang He led his troops to cut off the Shu army's access to water sources and surround them on the hill.

Upon receiving news of Ma Su's dire situation, Wang Ping led his 1,000 troops to the hill and ordered them to beat their drums loudly to create the impression that reinforcements had arrived. Zhang He mistook the drum sounds as a signal for ambush units, so he did not attack in Wang Ping's direction and pulled back. Wang Ping was thus able to regroup Ma Su's remaining troops and gather the Shu army's scattered supplies. In the aftermath of the loss of Jieting, Zhuge Liang had Ma Su executed for his blunder. Li Sheng (李盛) and Zhang Xiu (張休) were also put to death while Huang Xi (黃襲) along with others were relieved of the command of their soldiers. However, Wang Ping actions were met with honour and praise. Zhuge Liang appointed Wang Ping as Army Advisor with the task of managing military and camp affairs. Wang Ping was furthermore promoted to the rank of General Who Attacks Bandits (討寇將軍) and enfeoffed as a Marquis (亭侯).

In 231, when Zhuge Liang launched the fourth campaign against Wei, he tasked Wang Ping by ordering him to guard a hill located south of a Shu fortress at Lucheng (鹵城). While Sima Yi led his forces to attack Zhuge Liang, Zhang He led his soldiers to attack Wang Ping. However, Wang Ping firmly defended his position, managed to hold off the attack then drive back Zhang He.

After Zhuge Liang's death in 234, Wei Yan and Yang Yi entered into a power struggle with Wei Yan blocking the retreat route of the Shu forces to keep up the campaign against Wei. When they met in battle Yang Yi ordered Wang Ping to lead the soldiers, before the battle started Wang Ping came forward and called out to Wei Yan: "His Excellency (Zhuge Liang) had just died and his body had yet to turn cold, and now you dare to do something like this!". Wei Yan's soldiers knew that their commander was in the wrong therefore they soon scattered.

In one battle, Wei Yan's alleged mutiny was quelled and this was Wang Ping's achievement. Therefore, he was appointed as Rear Controller of the Army (後典軍), General Who Pacifies Han (安漢將軍) and as Administrator of Hanzhong (漢中太守) under the supervision of a senior Shu general, General of Chariots and Cavalry (車騎將軍), Wu Yi. Following Wu Yi's death in 237, Wang Ping replaced him as Area Commander of Hanzhong (漢中都督). The Shu emperor Liu Shan also enfeoffed Wang Ping as the Marquis of Anhan.

Thereafter, in 238 Jiang Wan led his troops to station at Mianyang and appointed Wang Ping as the Vanguard Protector of the Army (前護軍). Wang Ping was also given responsibility to manage his office affairs. In 243, however due to his poor health, Jiang Wan had to abandon his plan for a large campaign against Wei and relocate his base to Fu County (涪縣; present-day Mianyang, Sichuan). Nevertheless, he did promote Wang Ping to Vanguard Supervisor of the Army (前監軍), Senior General Who Guards the North (鎮北大將軍) and relocated him as Area Commander of Hanzhong again.

== Battle of Xingshi ==
In 244, the Wei regent Cao Shuang led an army of more than 100,000 soldiers with mixed cavalry and infantry to attack Hanzhong Commandery. While Hanzhong Commandery had less than 30,000 men and Wang Ping's subordinates, feeling intimidated by the sheer size of the enemy force in comparison to them, urged their general to vacate the area for a more concentrated defence to the rear.

An officer in Wang Ping's staff said: "For the moment, our strength is not sufficient to face such a strong enemy hence we should firmly retreat and defend the two cities of Hancheng and Luocheng. When the enemy come, we should let them go through the passes then when we are strong enough, the Fu army will be enough to defeat them and rescue the pass."

However Wang Ping answered: "I disagree with your plan. From Hanzhong to Fu, there is nearly a distance of a thousand li. It would allow the enemy to take the passes, from then they could easily defend it. Afterward, they could use it as a base for their next invasion. Here? we could risk a disaster. But now, the right course of action is to first send Liu Min and the Army Advisor Du to occupy the Xingshi's mountain while I will serve as the rear guard. If the enemy send a division toward Huangjin valley then I will lead a thousand men down there to defeat them. I will defend this position until the Fu army arrive. This is the best plan."

Among Wang Ping's officers, the General Who Protects the Army (護軍將軍) Liu Min insisted on following the defence arrangements previously set up by Wei Yan (when he was in charge of Hanzhong Commandery) to resist Wei invasions. Wang Ping agreed with Liu Min and ordered the troops to advance to Xingshi and occupy the mountains. Although he had only less than 30,000 troops at the time, the enemy did not know the strength of his army. Liu Min also ordered the Shu troops to erect a flow of flags and streamers across the mountain to create the impression of a larger army. When Cao Shuang led his army far into Shu's territory, Wang Ping's forces held the high ground and the mountains to solidify their defences and therefore stopped their advance. Later, Shu reinforcements from Fu and also Chengdu led by Fei Yi showed up at Xingshi. Thus, the Wei army ordered a retreat just as Wang Ping had originally planned.

== Appraisal and death ==
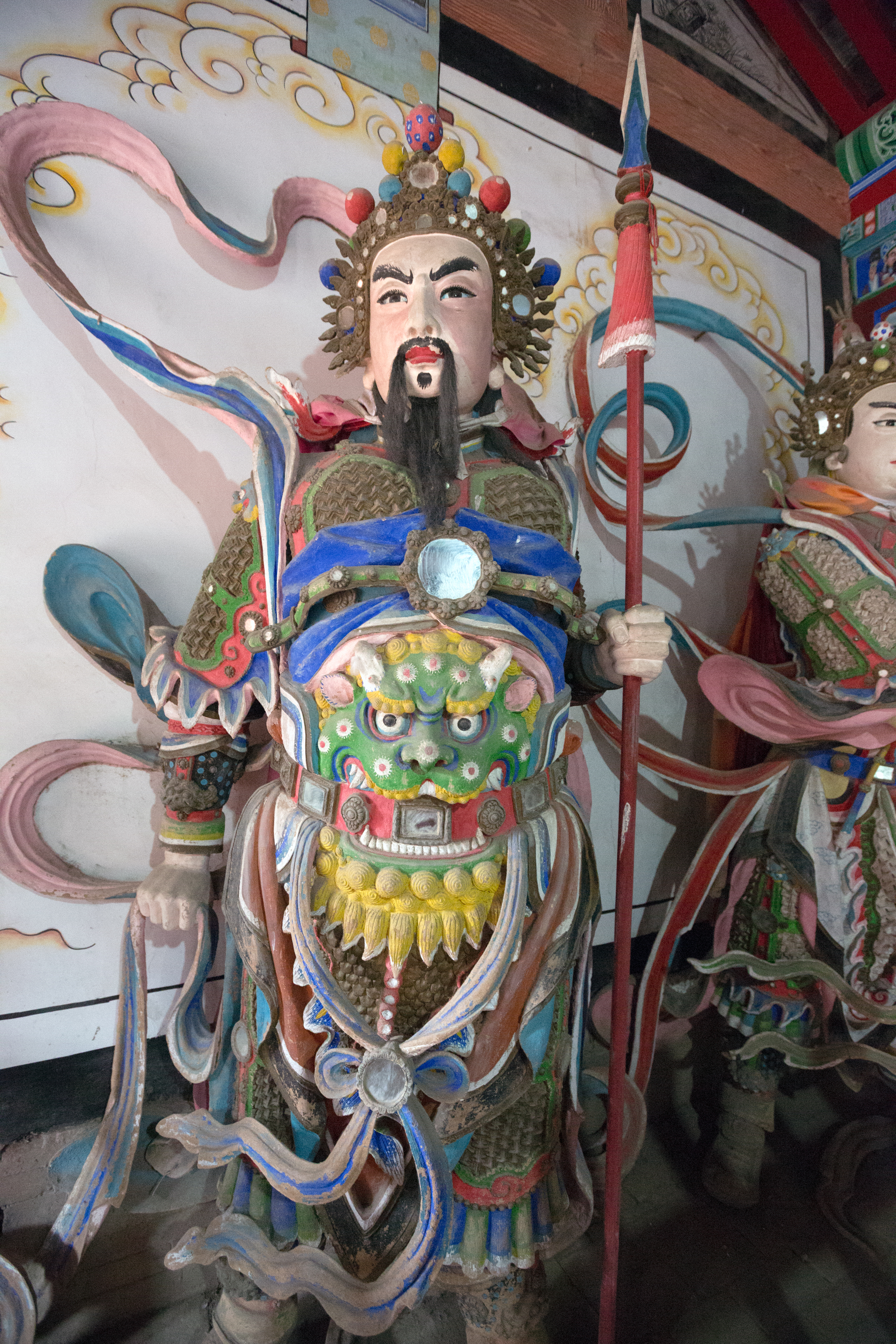
Statue of Wang Ping in the Zhuge Liang Memorial Temple in the Wuzhang Plains, Shaanxi

Chen Shou, who wrote Wang Ping's biography in the Records of the Three Kingdoms (Sanguozhi), appraised him as follows: "Wang Ping was loyal and brave yet lived a strict lifestyle... Along with Huang Quan, Li Hui, Lü Kai, Ma Zhong, Zhang Ni, It was thanks to their qualities that they were all well known through the empire and because they seized the opportunity given to them that they left strong legacies."

As Wang Ping came from a humble background and spent most of his life in the military, he received very little education. He could not write a single word and could read only a mere 10 words or so. Whenever he needed to write reports, he would dictate the content to his clerk, yet the reports were all rational and insightful. As he feared that others would ridicule him for his inability to read, he looked down on himself and belittle his own achievements and reputation. However, in his free time, he liked having others narrate to him the various Annals and Biographies in the Shiji and Hanshu, and could discuss them fluently.

Wang Ping was known to strictly obey the law and for his discipline. He never cracked jokes or took any situation lightly. From morning until dusk, his conduct was upright. He would also always appeared dressed as a military general. At the time, Wang Ping was in the north, Deng Zhi was in the east and Ma Zhong was in the south. The three of them had outstanding achievements and reputation.

Wang Ping died in 248. His son, Wang Xun (王訓), inherited his father's title and became the next Marquis of Anhan (安漢侯).

== In Romance of the Three Kingdoms ==
In the 14th-century historical novel Romance of the Three Kingdoms, Wang Ping was given a fictionalised and more prominent role in the Hanzhong Campaign, opposing Xu Huang's tactics and defecting. Xu Huang wanted his army to cross the Han River and battle Liu Bei's forces on the other side. Wang Ping warned that it would be impossible to retreat once they crossed the river, as the river would significantly slow down the retreat and they would be vulnerable to enemy fire. Xu Huang claimed that the soldiers would fight to the death and have no need to retreat if they were in a dire situation (in conjunction with a tactic by legendary Western Han dynasty general Han Xin, who intentionally placed his army near a river in order to unleash their full potential).

Wang Ping then claimed that Han Xin only used that tactic because the opposition had no strategist to see through it, but Liu Bei's army had the support of Zhuge Liang, who would be able to easily see through this tactic. Xu Huang refused to listen and, as expected, suffered great defeat. When he asked why Wang Ping did not come to his rescue, Wang Ping replied, "If I came to rescue you with my portion of the army, then our main camp would have had no protection. I warned you multiple times against crossing the river, but you did not listen, which resulted in this defeat." Xu Huang was greatly angered by this and planned to kill Wang Ping that night. However, the plan was leaked. Wang Ping set the camp on fire and defected to Liu Bei's side.

Right before Zhuge Liang died, he named Wang Ping, along with Liao Hua, Ma Dai, Zhang Ni and Zhang Yi, as the loyal generals of Shu who should be given greater responsibilities.

== See also ==
- Lists of people of the Three Kingdoms
