= Huang Quan (general) =

Chinese general of the Three Kingdoms era (died 240)

- 黃權

General of Chariots and Cavalry (車騎將軍)
- In office October or November 239 – May or June 240
- Monarch: Cao Fang
- Succeeded by: Wang Ling

Inspector of Yi Province (益州刺史) (nominal)
- In office ?–?
- Monarch: Cao Pi / Cao Rui

General Who Guards the South (鎮南將軍)
- In office 222 – October or November 239
- Monarch: Cao Pi / Cao Rui / Cao Fang

General Who Guards the North (鎮北將軍)
- In office 221 – 222
- Monarch: Liu Bei

Personal details
- Born: Unknown Langzhong, Sichuan
- Died: May or June 240 (Note: Cao Fang's biography in the Sanguozhi recorded that Huang Quan died in the 4th month of the 1st year of the Zhengshi era of Cao Fang's reign. This month corresponds to 9 May to 6 June 240 in the Gregorian calendar.)
- Children: Huang Chong; Huang Yong
- Occupation: Military general, politician
- Courtesy name: Gongheng (公衡)
- Posthumous name: Marquis Jing (景侯)
- Peerage: Marquis of Yuyang (育陽侯)

Huang Quan (died May or June 240), courtesy name Gongheng, was a Chinese military general and politician of the state of Cao Wei during the Three Kingdoms period of China. He previously served under the warlords Liu Zhang and Liu Bei during the late Eastern Han dynasty and in the state of Shu Han (founded by Liu Bei) during the early Three Kingdoms period before defecting to Cao Wei. Liu Bei relied heavily on Huang Quan for counsel in both domestic and foreign policy. Under the Wei government, however, Huang Quan was restricted to only internal affairs because even though the Wei emperor Cao Pi appreciated him for his talent, he doubted Huang Quan's allegiance and believed he was still secretly loyal to Liu Bei.

== Service under Liu Zhang ==
Huang Quan was from Langzhong County (閬中縣), Baxi Commandery (巴西郡), which is present-day Langzhong, Sichuan. He started his career at a young age as an official in the commandery office and was later recruited to be a Registrar (主簿) under Yi Province's governor, Liu Zhang.

Around 211, Zhang Song, an adviser to Liu Zhang, suggested to his lord to invite the warlord Liu Bei from Jing Province (covering present-day Hubei and Hunan) to assist them in countering their rival, Zhang Lu, in Hanzhong Commandery. Huang Quan strongly opposed Zhang Song's idea because he felt that Liu Bei was an ambitious person and might use the opportunity to seize control of Yi Province. Facing Liu Zhang, he said: "The General of the Left (Note: General of the Left refers to Liu Bei's title.) is of heroic reputation. Now if we welcome him into our land and treat him as a retainer whose role is to guard the province, then It would not satisfy him yet if we wish to offer him the courtesy of an honored guest then one state cannot hold two rulers. If a guest receive the security of the Mount Tai then the host is as feeble as a pile of eggs. All we need to do is to relied on the natural borders and await that the front line is clear."

However, Liu Zhang refused to listen to Huang Quan and he heeded Zhang Song's suggestion. Huang Quan was appointed as the Chief of Guanghan County (廣漢縣; south of present-day Shehong County, Sichuan).

Later in 212, as Huang Quan foresaw, conflict broke out between Liu Zhang and Liu Bei when the latter tried to seize control of Yi Province from the former. Huang Quan prepared the city for a siege and defended his position firmly even though many territories in Yi Province had already either been conquered or had voluntarily submitted to Liu Bei following his quick takeover of many of Liu Zhang's commanderies. He only surrendered when he heard that Liu Zhang had surrendered to Liu Bei in Chengdu (Yi Province's capital). After successfully annexing Yi Province, Liu Bei appointed Huang Quan as a Lieutenant-General (偏將軍).

Xu Zhong (徐衆), who wrote a commentary on the Sanguozhi, praised Huang Quan for his loyalty towards Liu Zhang when he remonstrated him against inviting Liu Bei into Yi province and for his righteousness when he prepared his city for a siege and resisted against the invaders therefore he complimented him for having the integrity of a worthy retainer. He also commended Liu Bei for appointing Huang Quan as a general after the latter's surrender, but remarked that Liu Bei's actions were not sufficient to highlight Huang Quan's virtues and encourage the worthies to serve at their utmost– something that a benevolent man should do. He provided an example of how King Wu of the Zhou dynasty paid homage to two officials known for their loyalty to the Shang dynasty – Bi Gan and Shang Rong – after he succeeded in overthrowing the Shang dynasty.

== Service under Liu Bei ==
In 215, after Zhang Lu lost to Liu Bei's rival Cao Cao at the Battle of Yangping, he escaped and took shelter in the Bazhong (巴中) region in northeastern Yi Province. At this time, Liu Bei was in conflict with Sun Quan over the Jing province yet Huang Quan cautioned Liu Bei against losing Hanzhong to Cao Cao because Hanzhong was the northern gateway into Yi Province, more precisely to the three Ba commanderies and being in this position would be like "severing the arms and thighs of the people of Shu". Liu Bei agreed with Huang Quan and quickly made peace with Wu dividing the Jing Province between West and East.

Liu Bei appointed Huang Quan as an Army Protector (護軍) and led his followers towards Bazhong to receive Zhang Lu, but when they arrived there, Zhang Lu had already returned to Hanzhong and surrendered to Cao Cao. Still, in the Ba region were Du Huo (杜濩), Pu Hu (朴胡), Yuan Yue (袁約) the Administrators of the three Ba commanderies whom Cao Cao had appointed. Huang Quan led some troops and totally routed the forces of Du Huo, Pu Hu and Yuan Yue. Later, Zhang He would try to relocate the population but would be defeated by Zhang Fei.

Between 217 and 219, Liu Bei, acting on Fa Zheng and Huang Quan's advice, launched a campaign to seize control of Hanzhong from Cao Cao. Chen Shou in Huang Quan's biography recorded that from the defeat of Du Huo (杜濩) and Pu Hu (朴胡) in Ba region to Xiahou Yuan's fall and the occupation of Hanzhong; all were the result of Huang Quan's planning. In 219, Liu Bei emerged victorious in this campaign and declared himself "King of Hanzhong" (漢中王) along with Governor of Yi Province (益州牧). Huang Quan was appointed as an Assistant Officer in the Headquarters Office (治中從事).

In 221, Liu Bei proclaimed himself emperor and founded the state of Shu, after which he planned to launch a military campaign against his former ally, Sun Quan, who had seized Jing Province from him in late 219 and killed his general Guan Yu. After a serie of early victories, Liu Bei wanted to press the Wu's forces further. However Huang Quan protested against this strategy and told him: "Sun Quan's forces are powerful and having them in this position allow them to use the Yangtze's river to their advantage moreover It would encourage their fighting spirit since it would make their retreat more difficult while making their attacks easier therefore I volunteer to lead the attack and suggest that your Majesty should remain behind to command the reserve's forces."

However, Liu Bei rejected Huang Quan's advice. He removed him from the main theater of operation and appointed Huang Quan as General Who Guards the North (鎮北將軍) and ordered him to defend the northern flank from possible attacks by the state of Wei (established by Cao Cao's successor Cao Pi), while he personally led the main Shu army and travelled along the Yangtze to attack Sun Quan. Liu Bei suffered a devastating defeat in the ensuing Battle of Xiaoting (221–222) at the hands of Sun Quan's forces and was forced to retreat. Huang Quan and his men were separated from Liu Bei's remaining forces after the battle and could not return to Shu; therefore they surrendered to Wei.

After Huang Quan defected to Wei, a Shu officer urged Liu Bei to execute Huang Quan's family members – who were still in Shu when Huang defected to Wei – but Liu Bei refused and said: "I let Huang Quan down but he didn't let me down." Liu Bei's treatment towards Huang Quan's family did not change despite Huang's defection.

Pei Songzhi, who annotated the Sanguozhi, compared Liu Bei's treatment of Huang Quan's family (after Huang Quan's defection) with the Han dynasty Emperor Wu's execution of Li Ling's family and noted the difference between Liu Bei's gain from treating Huang Quan's family well and Emperor Wu's loss by executing Li Ling's family. He quoted a line from the Classic of Poetry to describe Liu Bei: 'To be rejoiced in are ye, gentlemen; May ye preserve and maintain your posterity!'

== Service in Wei ==
When Huang Quan met the Wei emperor Cao Pi, the latter asked: "Are you trying to emulate Chen Ping and Han Xin when you abandoned the villains and agreed to serve me?" Huang Quan replied: "Lord Liu treated me generously so I won't surrender to Sun Quan. I can't return to Shu so I chose to submit to Wei. As a commander of a defeated army, I already feel grateful for being spared from death. Why would I even think about emulating the ancients?" Cao Pi was very impressed with Huang Quan. He appointed Huang Quan as a Palace Attendant and General who Guards the South (鎮南將軍), and enfeoffed him as the Marquis of Yuyang (育陽侯).

Later, when other Shu defectors brought news to Wei that Liu Bei had executed Huang Quan's family, Cao Pi ordered a memorial service to be held, but Huang Quan knew that those reports were false and told Cao Pi that him, along with Liu Bei and Zhuge Liang, trusted each other. Hence, they would understand the reason for his actions. Moreover, those news were recent and could be fallacious rumors. Therefore, he asked Cao Pi to wait longer for confirmation. He was proven right after the defectors were thoroughly questioned.

In 223, when news of Liu Bei's death reached Wei, many Wei officials congratulated Cao Pi but Huang Quan alone did not say anything. Cao Pi knew that Huang Quan would not betray him but he wanted to intimidate Huang Quan, so he repeatedly sent messengers to summon Huang Quan to see him. Huang Quan's subordinates were very fearful when they saw that Cao Pi had sent so many messengers but Huang Quan remained calm and composed.

Huang Quan was later appointed as the Inspector of Yi Province even though the province was not under Wei's jurisdiction. He was stationed in Henan. The Wei General-In-Chief Sima Yi, who regarded Huang Quan very highly, once asked him: "How many others are there like you in Shu?" Huang Quan laughed and replied" "I never expected you to regard me so highly!" On another occasion, Sima Yi wrote to the Shu regent Zhuge Liang: "Huang Gongheng is a clever gentleman. He always speaks highly of you."

Cao Rui, Cao Pi's son and successor, once asked Huang Quan: "What should we use to gauge the current situation of the Empire?" Huang Quan replied: "The study of the stars. We saw a yinghuo shouxin (Note: A yinghuo shouxin (熒惑守心) is an astrological phenomenon in which the Fire Star (the planet Mars) remains in the middle of the Heart constellation. This was regarded as an ill omen in ancient China.) when Emperor Wen (Cao Pi) died while the lords of Wu and Shu remained safe. This was an sign from the stars."

Sometime between 15 October and 12 November 239, during the reign of Cao Rui's successor Cao Fang, Huang Quan was promoted to the position of General of Chariots and Cavalry (車騎將軍) and received the same honours as the Three Ducal Ministers – the three highest ranked ministers in the Wei imperial court.

Huang Quan died sometime between 9 May and 6 June 240, and received the posthumous title "Marquis Jing" (景侯). His son, Huang Yong (黃邕), inherited his peerage and became the next Marquis of Yuyang (育陽侯). Huang Yong did not have a successor when he died.

== Huang Chong ==
Another son of Huang Quan, Huang Chong (黃崇), who remained in Shu after his father's defection to Wei, was appointed as an imperial secretary by the Shu government. In 263, when Wei launched a campaign to conquer Shu, Huang Chong accompanied the Shu general Zhuge Zhan to resist the Wei invaders led by Deng Ai. When the Shu army arrived in Fu County (涪縣; present-day Mianyang, Sichuan), Huang Chong suggested to Zhuge Zhan to swiftly take control of the mountainous terrain and use the geographical advantage to deter the enemy from advancing into the flat lands. When Zhuge Zhan hesitated, Huang Chong repeatedly urged the former to heed his advice, to the point of breaking down in tears. When Deng Ai's forces approached, Zhuge Zhan led his troops to engage the enemy at Mianzhu, where Huang Chong encouraged his men and expressed his willingness to fight to the death. Huang Chong and Zhuge Zhan were both killed in action at Mianzhu.

== Appraisal ==
Chen Shou, who wrote Huang Quan's biography in the Records of the Three Kingdoms (Sanguozhi), appraised him as follows: "Huang Quan was open minded of others and graceful in his thought... Along with Li Hui, Lü Kai, Ma Zhong, Wang Ping, Zhang Ni, It was thanks to their qualities that they were all well known through the empire and because they seized the opportunity given to them that they left strong legacies."

== See also ==
- Lists of people of the Three Kingdoms
