= Ma Zhong (Shu Han) =

Chinese Shu Han state general (died 249)

- 馬忠
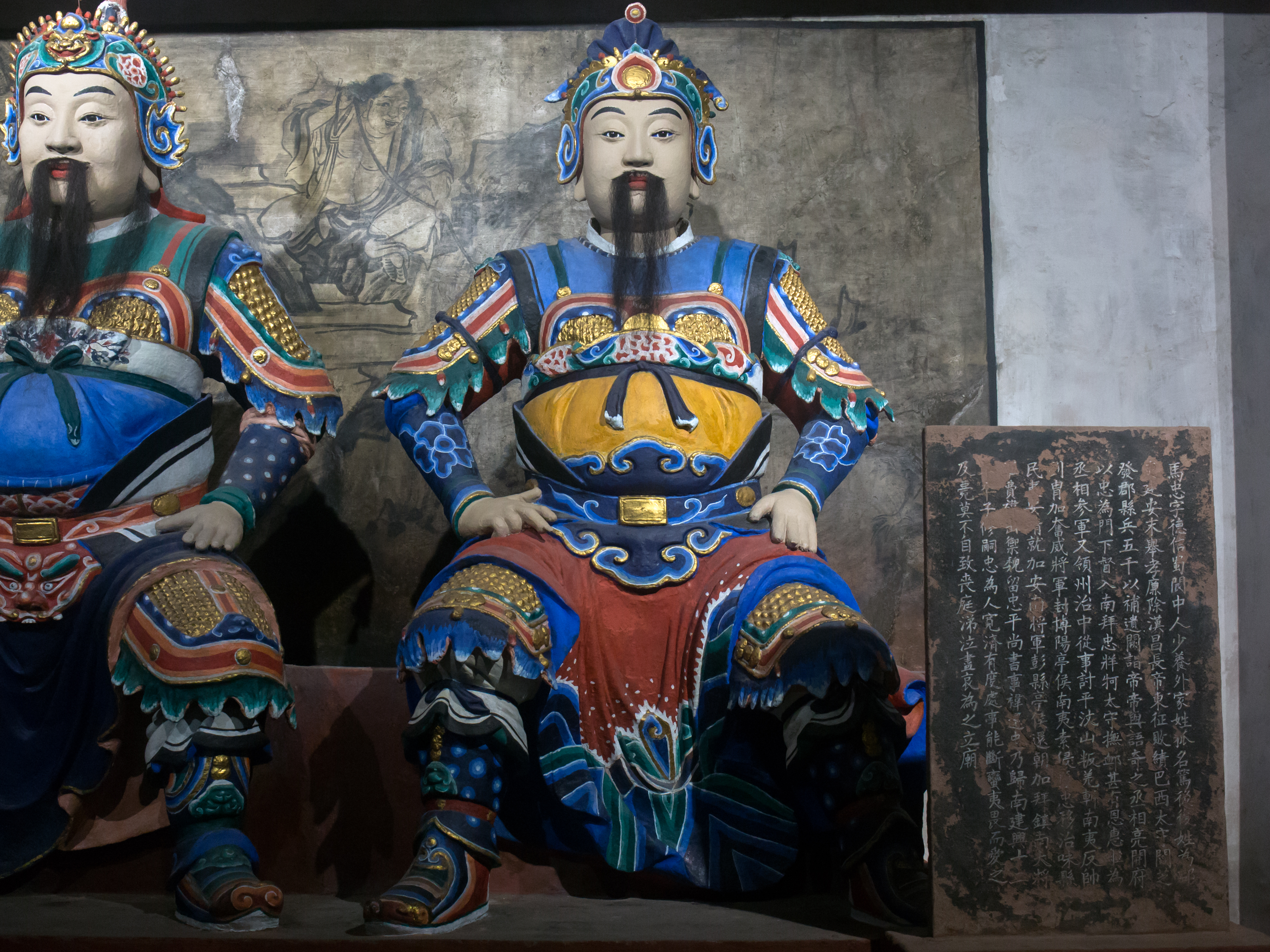
- Statue of Ma Zhong in a temple in Chengdu, Sichuan

Senior General Who Guards the South (鎮南大將軍)
- In office 242 – 249
- Monarch: Liu Shan

General Who Stabilises the South (安南將軍)
- In office ? – 242
- Monarch: Liu Shan
- Succeeded by: Zhang Biao

Area Commander of Laixiang (庲降都督)
- In office 233 – 249
- Monarch: Liu Shan
- Preceded by: Zhang Yi
- Succeeded by: Zhang Biao

Personal details
- Born: Unknown Langzhong, Sichuan
- Died: 249
- Children: Ma Xiu; Ma Hui; Ma Rong (Note: According to the Chronicles of Huayang, Ma Rong took part in the Jiao Province Campaign, but died without much contribution. He should not be confused with the Eastern Han scholar of the same name.)
- Occupation: Military general, politician
- Courtesy name: Dexin (德信)
- Peerage: Marquis of Pengxiang Village (彭鄉亭侯)
- Original name: Hu Du (狐篤)

Ma Zhong (died 249), courtesy name Dexin, originally named Hu Du, was a Chinese military general and politician of the state of Shu Han during the Three Kingdoms period of China. After Liu Bei's death, he served under Zhuge Liang during the Southern Campaign and helped to quell the rebellion. He was appointed as the area commander in the south after Li Hui's death where he spends most of his life pacifying the region, often with the help of Zhang Ni. Ma Zhong was known as generous and whimsical but also decisive in handling affairs. Hence the southern tribes both feared and respected him. His duty in the south could be comparable to Wang Ping in the north and Deng Zhi in the east. After his death, the foreigners sorely missed him and later established a temple in his honor.

== Life ==
Ma Zhong was born in Langzhong, Baxi Commandery (巴西郡), which is present-day Langzhong, Sichuan. As a child, he was raised by his maternal relatives. He was surnamed Hu (狐) and named Du (篤). Thereafter, he changed his surname back to his father's side, Ma (馬) and his name to Zhong (忠). He served as local official in the commandery. During the end of Jian'an (建安; 196–220 period), He was nominated as a xiaolian (civil service candidate) and appointed as Chief (長) of Hanchang (漢昌).

After Liu Bei's defeat at the Battle of Xiaoting. The Administrator of Baxi (巴西太守), Yan Zhi (閻芝) recruited from the counties under his jurisdiction, 5 000 soldiers to replace the lost ones, Ma Zhong was in charge of leading them. Liu Bei had already returned to Yufu County (魚復縣; present-day Fengjie County, Chongqing), which he renamed "Yong'an" (永安; literally "everlasting peace"). There he met Ma Zhong and spoke with him. Liu Bei commented to his Prefect of the Masters of Writing (尚書令), Liu Ba that although he lost Huang Quan, he gained Hu Du, showing that the world is not lacking talents.

After Liu Bei's death in 223, Zhuge Liang opened his office as Chancellor (丞相) and appointed Ma Zhong as his subordinate commander. In 225, Zhuge Liang led a Southern Campaign to quell the rebellion. Ma Zhong was promoted as Administrator of Zangke (牂牁太守). He participated in the expedition and defeated the previously appointed Zhu Bao (朱褒), who had joined the rebels. As Administrator, he helped the commandery to recover and brought stability among the people. Ma Zhong had, both authority and kindness.

In 230, Zhuge Liang summoned him to join the army as Army Adviser (參軍) and serve as assistant to his chief clerk, Jiang Wan. Furthermore, he was given additional appointment in the government office. Next year, he followed the army during the Battle of Mount Qi. After the army returned, he joined Zhang Ni as they suppressed a rebellion in Wenshan Commandery, led by Qiang tribe learders. In 233, Liu Zhou (劉胄), a strong leader of a foreign tribe, started a rebellion, disturbing all the commanderies. The Area Commander of Laixiang (庲降都督), Zhang Yi was relieved and Ma Zhong succeeded him. Ma Zhong led a successful campaign, beheaded Liu Zhou and pacified the south. For his accomplishment, Ma Zhong was further entrusted with military affairs, promoted to General Who is Firm (威將軍) and enfeoffed as the Marquis of Boyang Village (博陽亭侯).

During Yong Kai's rebellion, the rebels killed the Administrator of Jianing (巴西建寧), Zheng Ang (正昂) and captured his successor, Zhang Yi before sending him as captive to Eastern Wu. Since then, the Commander by fear always garrisoned away in Pingyi county. When Ma Zhong became the new Commander, he moved his headquarters to Wei County, Handan, among the Han civilians and foreigners. Moreover, Yuexi/Yuesui Commandery (越巂郡) was a lost territory. Ma Zhong alongside his Administrator, Zhang Ni led a successful campaign recovering the commandery. For his achievement, he was promoted to General Who Stabilises the South (安南將軍) and granted the Marquis of Pengxiang Village (彭鄉亭侯).

In 242, he was summoned to the court and charged with delivering an Imperial Order to Jiang Wan, preventing him from switching the land-based route to a water-based one from the Han River to attack the Wei-controlled Weixing (魏興) and Shangyong (上庸) commanderies. Ma Zhong was further promoted as Senior General Who Guards the South (鎮南大將軍). In 244, Cao Shuang attacked Battle of Xingshi, General-in-Chief (大將軍) Fei Yi went north to resist the invaders. Ma Zhong was left in charge of the secretariat government at Chengdu. After Fei Yi returned, Ma Zhong left for the south. In 249, he died. His son, Ma Xiu (馬脩) inherited his father's title and became the next Pengxiang Village (彭鄉亭侯). While Ma Xiu's younger brother, Ma Hui (馬恢) had his son Ma Yi (馬義), appointed as the Administrator of Jianning (晉建寧太守) during the Jin dynasty.

== Appraisal and successors ==
Chen Shou, who wrote Ma Zhong's biography in the Records of the Three Kingdoms (Sanguozhi), appraised him as follows: "Ma Zhong was at the same time gentle yet resolute... Along with Huang Quan, Li Hui, Lü Kai, Wang Ping, Zhang Ni, It was thanks to their qualities that they were all well known through the empire and because they seized the opportunity given to them that they left strong legacies."

Ma Zhong was known as generous and benevolent in his treatment of people however he was also whimsical and liked to tease others then greatly laughed. Yet when he was furious, he would not let his anger be apparent. When he handled civil and military affairs he was decisive and would show both authority and kindness. Therefore the foreigners both awed and loved him. When he died, all of them were present in the funeral hall and wept for him with utmost sorrow. They established for him a Temple to commemorate his memory.

Chang Qu in the Huayang Guo Zhi stated that when he was administering the south, Ma Zhong showed kindness to those afar and helpfulness to those close to him. To everyone, he showed great concern and magnanimity. For his effort, his highest position was Senior General Who Guards the South (鎮南大將軍), a position that (except him) none of the governors of the southern lands would attain. After Ma Zhong's death, the people of the south built a shrine in his honor and would pray to him in time of hardship.

Zhang Biao, (Note: Zhang Biao was the son of Zhang Su (張肅) and posthumously adopted by Zhang Song (張松) to continue his family line.) was a scholar whose reputation for refinement surpassed Ma Zhong. He succeeded Ma Zhong's position as General Who Stabilises the South (安南將軍). He was assisted by Yang Xi of Qianwei Commandery (犍為郡), who joined him was appointed as his deputy.

Yet with the possible exception of Li Hui, Ma Zhong was the most popular Area Commander for Shu-Han's southern lands. Yan Yu (閻宇), whose courtesy name was Wenping (文平) showed ability and would easily achieve his objectives while being diligent and conscientious in the civil affairs. Along with Zhang Biao, they were in charge of administering the south after Ma Zhong's death. However, their authority and merits both never reached those of Ma Zhong.

== See also ==
- Lists of people of the Three Kingdoms
