= Zhuge Liang's Southern Campaign =

Shu Han state military campaign (225)

- Part of the wars of the Three Kingdoms period
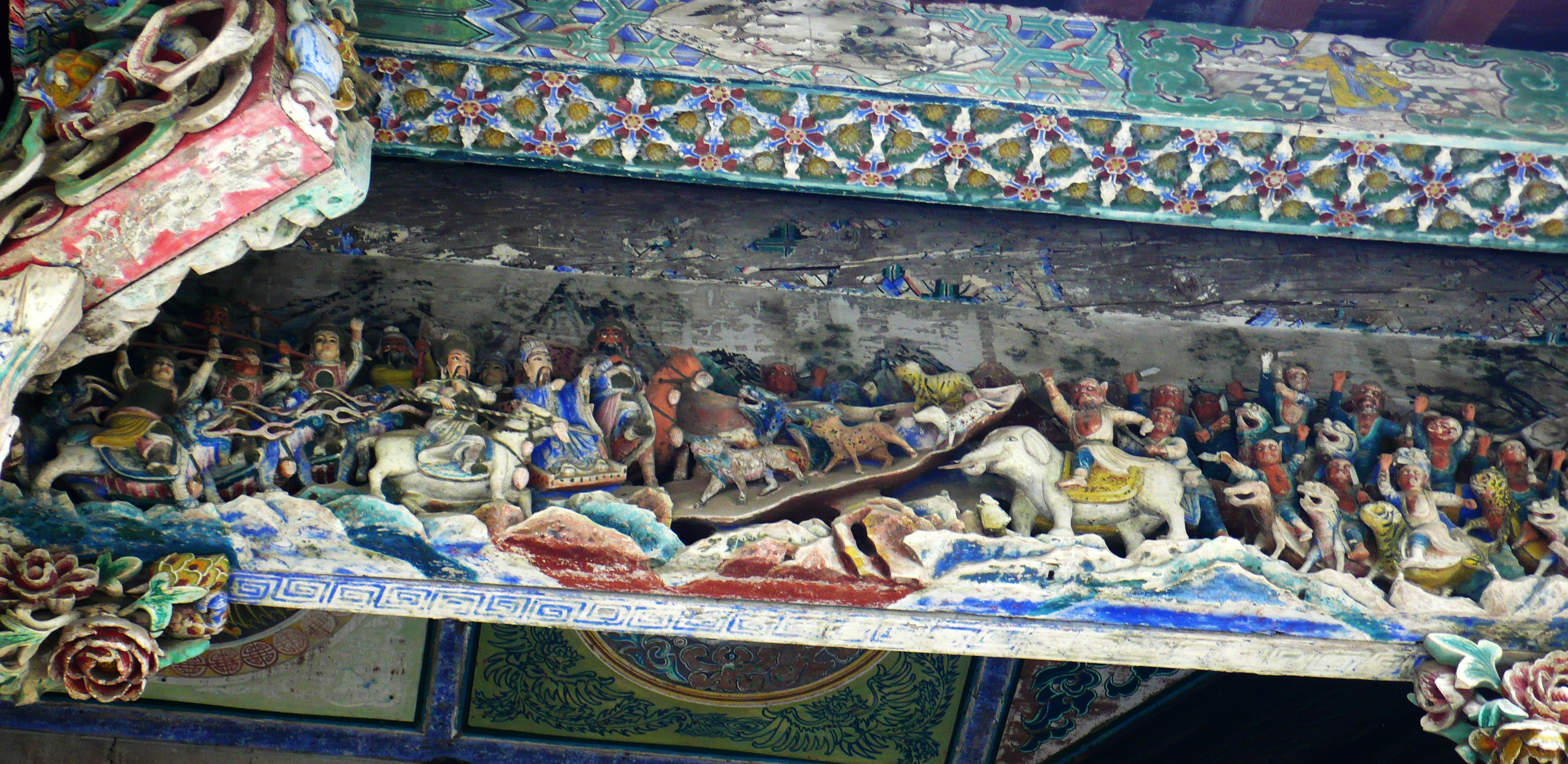
- Wooden diorama in Huaxilou, Bozhou, Anhui depicting Zhuge Liang's campaign against the Nanman
Date	Spring – Autumn 225
Location	Nanzhong (covering present-day Yunnan, Guizhou and southern Sichuan), China
Result	Shu Han victory

Belligerents
Shu Han	Shu rebels, Nanman

Commanders and leaders
Zhuge Liang; Ma Zhong; Li Hui	Yong Kai †; Zhu Bao; Gao Ding (executed); Meng Huo (surrendered)

Zhuge Liang's Southern Campaign
- Traditional Chinese: 諸葛亮南征
- Simplified Chinese: 诸葛亮南征
Transcriptions
Standard Mandarin
- Hanyu Pinyin: Zhūgě Liàng Nán Zhēng

War of Pacification in Nanzhong
- Traditional Chinese: 南中平定戰
- Simplified Chinese: 南中平定战
Transcriptions
Standard Mandarin
- Hanyu Pinyin: Nánzhōng Píngdìng Zhàn

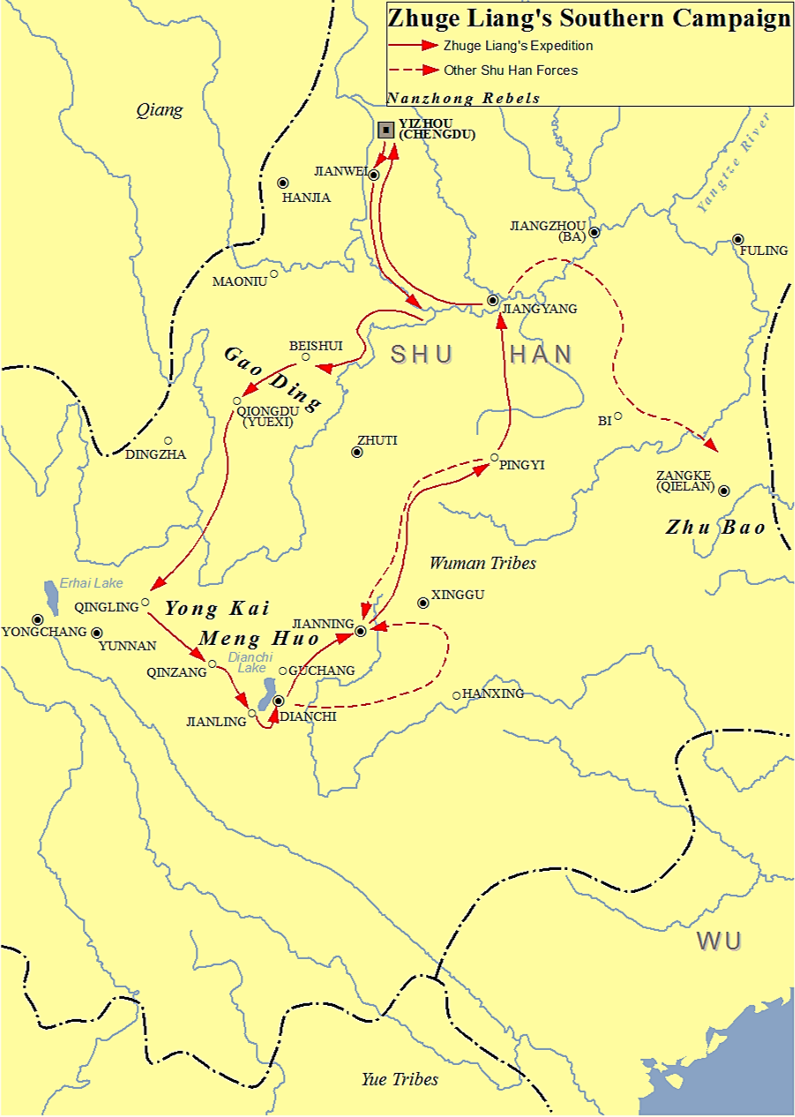
Zhuge Liang's Southern Campaign

Zhuge Liang's Southern Campaign, also known as the War of Pacification in Nanzhong, was a military campaign that took place in 225 during the early Three Kingdoms period (220–280) in China. It was led by Zhuge Liang, the Imperial Chancellor of the state of Shu Han, against the opposing forces in the Nanzhong region (covering parts of present-day Yunnan, Guizhou and southern Sichuan). The campaign was a response to rebellions started by local governors in the Nanzhong region and intrusions by the Nanman (literally: "southern barbarians").

== Background ==
In October 222, Liu Bei, the founding emperor of Shu, lost the Battle of Xiaoting against Shu's ally-turned-rival state Wu. He died in Baidicheng (in present-day Fengjie County, Chengdu) in June 223.

=== Yong Kai's rebellion ===
Yong Kai (雍闓), a descendant of Yong Chi (雍齒) and an official active in the Nanzhong region, heard about Liu Bei's death and started a rebellion against Shu rule. He killed Zheng Ang (正昂), the Shu-appointed Administrator of Jianning Commandery (建寧郡; around present-day Qujing, Yunnan), and took Zheng Ang's successor Zhang Yi hostage. The Shu general Li Yan wrote a total of six letters to Yong Kai to dissuade him from rebelling, but Yong Kai arrogantly replied, "I heard that the sky cannot have two suns and the land cannot have two rulers. Now, from a distance away, I see that the empire has been divided into three, so I am fearful and confused and do not know to whom to pledge allegiance."

At the urging of Shi Xie and the Wu general Bu Zhi, Yong Kai agreed to pledge allegiance to Wu and he sent Zhang Yi as a captive to the Wu emperor Sun Quan to express his sincerity. In return, Sun Quan appointed him as the Administrator of Yongchang Commandery (永昌郡; covering parts of present-day western Yunnan), which was then guarded by the Shu officials Lü Kai and Wang Kang (王伉). When Yong Kai showed up to take control of Yongchang, Lü Kai and Wang Kang refused to recognise his legitimacy and led both the local government and civilians to resist Yong Kai and to prevent him from entering Yongchang. Yong Kai then repeatedly wrote letters to them in an attempt to convince them that he was the rightful administrator, but Lü Kai refuted Yong Kai's claims and managed to retain control over Yongchang because its people highly regarded and trusted him.

=== Rebellions by Gao Ding and Zhu Bao ===
Around 223, as Shu was still mourning Liu Bei's death, Zhuge Liang, the Imperial Chancellor and regent of Shu, decided to focus on domestic policy to promote stability and accumulate resources before using military force to quell the uprisings in the Nanzhong region. Meanwhile, he also sent Deng Zhi and Chen Zhen as diplomats to Wu to meet Sun Quan and convince him to make peace with Shu and rebuild the Shu–Wu alliance against their rival state, Wei.

In the meantime, Gao Ding (高定; or Gao Dingyuan 高定元), the chief of the Sou tribe (叟族) in Yuexi/Yuesui Commandery (越巂郡; around present-day Xichang, Sichuan) had heard about Yong Kai's rebellion and decided to join. He killed Jiao Huang (焦璜), the administrator of Yuexi/Yuesui appointed by the Shu government. While Zhuge Liang was planning for a military campaign against the rebels, he appointed Gong Lu as the new Administrator of Yuexi/Yuesui and sent him there to make preparations in advance. However, Gong Lu ended up being killed by Gao Ding.

Around the same time, Zhuge Liang also sent an official, Qi Xing (頎行), to conduct an investigation in Zangke Commandery (牂柯郡; around present-day Guiyang or Fuquan, Guizhou). Upon arriving in Zangke, Qi Xing detained all the lower-ranked officials for questioning. Zhu Bao (朱褒), the Shu-appointed Administrator (太守) of Zangke, had heard of the rebellions in the neighboring Jianning and Yuexi/Yuesui Commanderies and so he killed Qi Xing and joined the rebels.

=== Involvement of Meng Huo and the Nanman ===
After failing to capture Yongchang Commandery from Lü Kai and Wang Kang, Yong Kai turned to the Nanman tribes for help, but they were unwilling to listen to him. Yong Kai then sought help from Meng Huo, a local leader with much influence and popularity among the Nanman. Meng Huo lied to the Nanman that Shu's government had made unreasonable demands from them and successfully incited them to rebel against Shu's rule.

== Pacifying Nanzhong ==
In the spring of 225, after Shu rebuilt its alliance with Wu against their rival state Wei, Zhuge Liang, the Imperial Chancellor of Shu, personally led Shu imperial forces south to pacify the Nanzhong region and quell the rebellions. Wang Lian, Zhuge Liang's chief clerk, attempted to dissuade him from participating in the campaign, but Zhuge Liang insisted because he was worried that the Shu generals might not be competent enough to deal with the rebels on their own.

Ma Su, a close aide of Zhuge Liang, suggested that they focus on psychological warfare (winning the hearts of the people in Nanzhong), rather than conventional warfare, to prevent rebellions from breaking out again. Zhuge Liang readily accepted Ma Su's advice.

Shu Emperor Liu Shan awarded Zhuge Liang a ceremonial axe and held a grand ceremony to see him off on the campaign. Attendants bearing parasols made of feathers walked in front of and behind him, an entourage of 60 huben imperial guards escorted him, and drums rolled and trumpets blared in the background.

The Shu army travelled along a water route from Anshang County (安上縣; present-day Pingshan County, Sichuan) to Yuexi/Yuesui Commandery and entered the Nanzhong region. In response, Gao Ding and Yong Kai constructed several forts in Maoniu (旄牛; present-day Hanyuan County, Sichuan), Dingze (定筰; present-day Yanyuan County, Sichuan) and Beishui (卑水; southeast of present-day Zhaojue County, Sichuan) counties. Zhuge Liang then led the Shu army to Beishui County, where he hoped the rebels would converge so that he could defeat all of them in one battle. Meanwhile, Gao Ding's subordinate(s) killed Yong Kai. Zhuge Liang then used the opportunity to strike back and defeated Gao Ding, whom he had captured and beheaded.

Zhuge Liang then ordered Ma Zhong to lead troops southeast from Bodao County (僰道縣; present-day Yibin, Sichuan) to attack Zangke Commandery, and Li Hui to lead troops southwest from Pingyi County (平夷縣; northeast of present-day Bijie, Guizhou) to attack Jianning Commandery. When Li Hui reached Kunming, he lost contact with Zhuge Liang and ended up being surrounded by the rebels, who had twice as many men as he did. Li Hui then lied to the rebels and said that he actually wanted to join them. Just as the rebels believed him and lowered their guard, he used the opportunity to strike back and move south to Panjiang (槃江) to meet up with Ma Zhong, who had just defeated Zhu Bao's rebel forces and recaptured Zangke. Ma Zhong and Li Hui's units rendez-voused with Zhuge Liang's main army and prepared to attack Meng Huo, who incorporated the remnants of the rebel forces into his own.

Zhuge Liang knew that Meng Huo was popular and respected among the locals in the Nanzhong region and so he wanted to let him live. After Meng Huo was captured, Zhuge Liang showed him around the Shu camp and asked what he thought. Meng Huo replied, "Before this, I knew nothing about your army, which was why I lost. Now that you have shown me around your camp, I know the conditions of your army and will be able to defeat you easily." Zhuge Liang laughed, released him, and allowed him to return for another battle. The same cycle repeated for a total of seven times. On the seventh time, Meng Huo surrendered and told Zhuge Liang, "Sir, you have shown me Heaven's might. The people of the south will never rebel again." Zhuge Liang then led his forces towards Dian Lake in triumph.

== Aftermath ==
After pacifying the four commanderies of Yizhou (益州 or Jianning 建寧), Yongchang (永昌), Zangke (牂柯) and Yuexi/Yuesui (越巂), Zhuge Liang reformed the administrative divisions to create another two commanderies, Yunnan (雲南) and Xinggu (興古), to improve the quality of the local governments in the Nanzhong region. He wanted to allow the people to those lands themselves and avoided appointing non-locals as the governors. He pointed out the problems with leaving non-locals in charge. The people in Nanzhong had recently lost their loved ones in the battles and might still harbor bitter feelings towards the Shu government. If they had non-locals to govern them, they might feel even more resentful and choose to rebel again. Also, if non-locals were put in charge, the Shu government would need to station troops in the area to protect them.

Before completely withdrawing all Shu soldiers from the Nanzhong region, Zhuge Liang told Meng Huo and the other local leaders that he only required them to pay tribute to the Shu government in the form of gold, silver, oxen, warhorses, etc. He appointed locals such as Li Hui (from Jianning Commandery) and Lü Kai (from Yongchang Commandery) as commandery administrators. The commandery administrators were different from their predecessors in the sense that they served only as representatives of the Shu government in the region; the locals were governed by their respective local leaders and tribal chiefs.

More than ten thousand families of the Qiang (羌) tribes along with other strong foreigners from Nanzhong clans were relocated deeper into the Shu region and reorganized into five divisions. Since no enemy could resist them, they were nicknamed the "Flying Army" (無當飛軍). The rest of the foreigners were divided under the great clans of Nanzhong, those were: Jiao (焦), Yong (雍), Lou (婁), Cuan (爨), Meng (孟), Liang (量), Mao (毛) and Li (李). Furthermore, they were put under the "Five Commandants" (五部) also called the "Five Lords" (五子). The people of Nanzhong referred to them as the "Four Clans" (四姓) and the "Five Lords" (五子).

Since many foreigners did not want to serve under them or enrich the great clans, the local prefects put forward the policy to trade gold and silk with them and encourage trade to persuade those people to develop as family divisions, with many of them securing important hereditary positions. The policy motivated the tribal people to gather rare resources and progressively brought them under the control of the Han government until they became Han subjects.

After his campaign, Zhuge Liang recruited many talented individuals among the foreign leaders such as Cuan Xi (爨習) of Jianning Commandery, Meng Yan (孟琰) of Zhuti Commandery and Meng Huo who became his subordinates. Cuan Xi’s highest office was General Who Commands The Army (領軍將軍), Meng Yan was General Who Supports the Han (輔漢將軍), and Meng Huo was Assistant to the Imperial Counsellor (御史中丞).

Many resources were taken from Nanzhong such as gold, silver, cinnabar and lacquer while plow oxen and war horses were used to support the army and the State. Moreover, the commanders often recruited soldiers among the local people.

The people in Nanzhong never rebelled against Shu rule again for as long as Zhuge Liang was still alive. Historical documents show that there were occasional revolts in the area. However, the rebellion in the region was quelled at the local government level that was appointed by Zhuge Liang, unlike before. In addition, Zhuge Liang's expedition was generally successful since the local influential people who co-operated with Shu Han stabilized the area and provided Shu Han with abundant supplies and manpower.

== In Romance of the Three Kingdoms ==
Although historical records mentioned that Zhuge Liang captured and released Meng Huo a total of seven times throughout the campaign, no details were provided. The 14th-century historical novel Romance of the Three Kingdoms, which romanticizes the events before and during the Three Kingdoms period, spends a total of about four-and-a-half chapters (87 to 91) in fleshing out the details of each of the seven battles. It includes numerous fictional characters associated with Meng Huo, such as Lady Zhurong (Meng Huo's wife), Meng You (Meng Huo's brother) and other Nanman chieftains such as King Mulu and King Duosi. Also, in the novel, the Shu generals Zhao Yun, Wei Yan and Ma Dai actively participate in the campaign even though historically, there is no mention of their involvement.

1. First battle: Zhao Yun leads his troops to attack Meng Huo and defeats his army. Wei Yan captures Meng Huo and brings him before Zhuge Liang. When Meng Huo complains that he was captured through trickery, Zhuge Liang releases him and allows him to return for another battle.
2. Second battle: Meng Huo builds a series of fortifications across a river and taunts the Shu forces to attack him. Ma Dai cuts off his supply route and kills Jinhuan Sanjie, Meng Huo's subordinate who was protecting the river fortifications. Ahuinan and Dongtuna, two of Meng Huo's subordinates, betray their master, capture him, and hand him over as a prisoner to Zhuge Liang. Like before, Meng Huo complains that he did not had a chance to fight the enemy fair and square. Zhuge Liang shows him around the Shu camp and releases him.
3. Third battle: Meng Huo's younger brother Meng You pretends to surrender to Zhuge Liang and promises to lure Meng Huo into a trap. However, Zhuge Liang knows that is a ploy and so he also pretends to play along, captures both of them in the trap, and releases them again.
4. Fourth battle: When Meng Huo hears that the Shu army is planning to retreat, he gathers all his troops and attacks the Shu camp. He falls into the pit traps in the camp and ends up being captured again. Zhuge Liang releases him once more.
5. Fifth battle: Meng Huo, having learnt his lesson from his previous defeats, adopts a more defensive stance. He lures the Shu forces into the poisonous marshes around the caves of his ally, King Duosi. However, Zhuge Liang manages to avoid the dangers of the marshes with the help of Meng Jie, Meng Huo's elder brother who does not participate in Meng Huo's rebellion against Shu. The Shu forces defeat and kill King Duosi and capture Meng Huo again. Like before, Zhuge Liang releases Meng Huo again.
6. Sixth battle: Meng Huo's wife Lady Zhurong joins the battle and captures the Shu generals Ma Zhong and Zhang Ni. Ma Dai defeats Lady Zhurong later and captures her. Zhuge Liang releases Lady Zhurong in exchange for Ma Zhong and Zhang Ni. Meng Huo then turns to his ally King Mulu for help. King Mulu has the ability to control wild animals and direct them in battle. However, the Shu army is prepared for that uses fire-breathing contraptions (referred to as juggernauts in some translations) to scare away the animals. King Mulu is killed in battle, and Meng Huo ends up being captured again, but Zhuge Liang releases him once more.
7. Seventh battle: Meng Huo turns to another ally, Wutugu, for help. Wutugu's soldiers wear a special type of armour made of rattan which can deflect sharp blades and arrows. Zhuge Liang comes up with a plan for Wei Yan to lure Wutugu and his army into a trap in a valley, where explosives and firetraps have been set. The flammable rattan armor catches fire easily, and Wutugu and his army completely perish in the valley. Meng Huo is captured once more. This time, he feels ashamed of himself and decides to surrender to Zhuge Liang and swear allegiance to Shu for the rest of his life.

== In popular culture ==
A popular legend tells of how Zhuge Liang invented the mantou, a kind of steamed bun, during the campaign. It probably rose from the fact that the name mantou (馒头; 饅頭; mántóu) is homonymous with mantou (蛮头; 蠻頭; mántóu; 'barbarian's head'). The story tells that on the way back after the campaign, Zhuge Liang and the Shu army came to a swift-flowing river which defied all attempts to cross it. Locals informed him that he must sacrifice 50 men and throw their heads into the river to appease the river deity, which will then allow them to cross. As Zhuge Liang did not want to cause further bloodshed, he ordered buns shaped roughly like human heads, round with a flat base, to be made and thrown into the river. After a successful crossing, he named the bun "barbarian's head", which evolved into the present-day mantou.

== Sources ==
- Chang, Qu (c. 4th century). Chronicles of Huayang (Huayang Guo Zhi).
- Chen, Shou (3rd century). Records of the Three Kingdoms (Sanguozhi).
- Luo, Guanzhong (14th century). Romance of the Three Kingdoms (Sanguo Yanyi).
- Pei, Songzhi (5th century). Annotated Records of the Three Kingdoms (Sanguozhi zhu).
- Sima, Guang (1084). Zizhi Tongjian.
