= Nanzhong =

Historical name for a region in southwest China

Coordinates: 27.566721°N 105.314941°E

Nanzhong (Chinese: 南中; pinyin: Nánzhōng) is the ancient name for a region in southwest China that covers parts of present-day Yunnan, Guizhou and southern Sichuan provinces.

During the Three Kingdoms period (220–280) of China, the Nanzhong region was part of the territory of the state of Shu Han (or simply Shu). In 225, some local governors rebelled against Shu Han rule while the Nanman tribes made intrusions into Nanzhong. In response, the Shu Han regent Zhuge Liang led imperial forces on a campaign in Nanzhong and succeeded in quelling the rebellions and pacifying the Nanman tribes. In legend, Zhuge Liang captured and released the Nanman leader Meng Huo seven times until the latter finally swore allegiance to Shu Han.
