= Nanman =

Ancient inhabitants of Southern China

- Zhou geography: Huaxia surrounded by the Four Barbarians—Dongyi in the east, Nanman in the south, Xirong in the west, and Beidi in the north.
- Traditional Chinese: 南蠻
- Simplified Chinese: 南蛮
- Literal meaning: Southern Man (ethnonym)
Transcriptions
Standard Mandarin
- Hanyu Pinyin: Nánmán
- Wade–Giles: Nan-man
Hakka
- Pha̍k-fa-sṳ: Nàm-màn
Yue: Cantonese
- Jyutping: Naam4 Maan4
Southern Min
- Hokkien POJ: Lâm-bân
- Tâi-lô: Lâm-bân

The Man, commonly known as the Nanman or Southern Man (Chinese: 南蠻; Jyutping: Naam4 Maan4; Pe̍h-ōe-jī: Lâm-bân, lit. Southern Barbarians, Southern Savages), were ancient indigenous peoples who lived in inland South and Southwest China, mainly around the Yangtze River valley. In ancient Chinese sources, the term Nanman was used to collectively describe multiple ethnic groups, probably the predecessors of the modern Miao, Zhuang, and Dai peoples, and non-Chinese Sino-Tibetan groups such as the Jingpo and Yi peoples. It was an umbrella term that included any groups south of the expanding Huaxia civilization, and there was never a single polity that united these people, although the state of Chu ruled over much of the Yangtze region during the Zhou dynasty and was partly influenced by the Man culture.

== Etymology ==
The early Chinese exonym Man (蠻) was a graphic pejorative written with Radical 142 虫, which means "worm", "insect" or "vermin". Xu Shen's (c. 121 CE) Shuowen Jiezi dictionary defines Man as "Southern Man are a snake race. [The character is formed] from [the] insect / serpent [radical and takes its pronunciation from] luàn 南蠻蛇種从虫䜌聲."

William H. Baxter and Laurent Sagart (2014) reconstruct the Old Chinese name of Mán as 蠻 *mˤro[n]. Baxter & Sagart (2014) provide a similar Old Chinese reconstruction for Min 閩 *mrə[n] 'southern tribes', which is also a name for Fujian province. Today, similar-sounding self-designated ethnonyms among modern-day peoples include Mraṅmā, Hmong, Mien, Bru, Mro, Mru, and Maang. The ethnonym Hmong is reconstructed as *hmʉŋ^{A} in Proto-Hmongic by Ratliff (2010), while Mien is reconstructed as *mjæn^{A} in Proto-Mienic (see Proto-Hmong–Mien language).

== History ==
The Man were described in the Book of Rites as one of the Four Barbarians associated with the south. They tattooed their foreheads, had inwards pointing feet, and ate raw food. Although various stereotypes and accounts are recorded in the Book of Rites, little detail is actually known about their inner social hierarchies, their social customs, and the social interdependence among the tribes at that time.

During the Spring and Autumn period, King Wu of Chu (r. 741—690 BC) undertook many campaigns against the Man, who rebelled during the reign of King Zhuang of Chu (r. 613–591 BC). (Note: The Zuozhuan refers to the rebelling Man at the time of King Zhuang as the "Qunman" (群蠻), meaning "many Man" or "various Man.") During the reign of King Dao of Chu, the general Wu Qi also conducted campaigns against the Man. When the state of Qin conquered Chu, they found that the commandery of Qianzhong, corresponding to modern Hubei, Hunan, and Guizhou, was still inhabited by Man people.

Under the Han dynasty, the Man were recognized as three distinct groups: the Pangu, Linjun, and Bandun. The Pangu worshiped dog totems and lived in the commanderies of Wuling and Changsha. They were also known as the Man of the Five Creeks. The Pangu had no unified leader but individual chiefs were acknowledged as local administrators by the Han. They wore clothes woven from tree bark, used dotted patterns for their robes, wore short skirts, and painted their legs red. The Linjun lived further west in the commanderies of Ba and Nan, around modern Chongqing. Linjun was actually the name of a chief, who according to Linjun mythology, turned into a white tiger upon his death. Thus the Linjun worshiped the tiger. The Bandun Man (literally "board shield" barbarians) lived further west of the Linjun and were known for their music and heroic conduct in war. They supported Liu Bang after the fall of the Qin dynasty and contributed troops to Han campaigns against the Qiang people. According to legend, they killed a white tiger during the reign of King Zhaoxiang of Qin (r. 306–251 BC) and were therefore spared from taxes.

The Bandun Man rebelled in 179 due to unrest caused by the Yellow Turban Rebellion, but when amnesty was issued by Cao Qian in 182, the rebellion was ended. There was another brief uprising in 188 which amounted to nothing. Related to the Bandun were the neighboring Zong (賨) people, who became interested in the mysticism of the Celestial Master Zhang Lu and moved north to the border of his territory. When Cao Cao attacked Zhang Lu in the summer of 215, he fled to Duhu of the Zong and Fuhu of the Bandun for refuge. However Duhu and Fuhu surrendered to Cao Cao in the autumn and received appointment, with Zhang Lu following in the winter. The Bandun and Zong were settled in what is now modern Gansu province. In 219, Liu Bei's officer Huang Quan attacked them and drove several non-Chinese peoples north into Cao Cao's territory. The Zong from the Ba region in particular mingled with the tribal Di people in Guanzhong. These people became known as the Ba Di, and they later founded one of the Sixteen Kingdoms, the Cheng-Han (304–347).

In southwest China, the Nanman tribes rebelled after the death of Shu Han's founder, Liu Bei, in 223.The Shu Han chancellor, Zhuge Liang, led a successful expedition to quell the rebellion in 225. One of the leaders of the Nanman, Meng Huo, was captured seven times before he surrendered. The campaign was retold in the famous 14th-century historical novel, Romance of the Three Kingdoms, which provides a heavily romanticized narrative of the events that happened.

After the fall of the Han dynasty, the Man became more integrated into Han Chinese society. A notable example was Zhang Chang, a Jin dynasty rebel from one of the Man tribes in Hubei who was allowed to serve as a county official prior to his rebellion. During the period of Northern and Southern dynasties, the Man were able to remain independent by switching sides out of political expedience. The southern courts appointed Man chiefs as tax collectors for their regions. Many Man chiefs taxed their subjects lightly which resulted in some Han Chinese pretending to be Man people. On one occasion, a Han Chinese called Huan Dan (桓誕) even became a Man chieftain. The Man also rebelled at times. Defeated tribes were resettled at border garrisons or became slaves in the metropolitan area. Generally speaking, the trend was for the Nanman to migrate ever northward. By the 7th century, the ethnic character of Man society was decidedly mixed.

== Culture ==
The Nanman "Southern Man" tattooed their foreheads and were a totem worshiping people. Among their totems were those dedicated to tiger, snake, and dog deities.

== Modern China ==
The She people and Yao people are said to be descended from the Man. The "Nan Man Zi" (Chinese: 南蠻子, lit. Southern Barbarian) is now still a term to call the people from southern China used by northern Chinese.
