= Shu Han =

Empire in China from 221 to 263; one of the Three Kingdoms

Han 漢
- May 221–c.Dec 263 AD
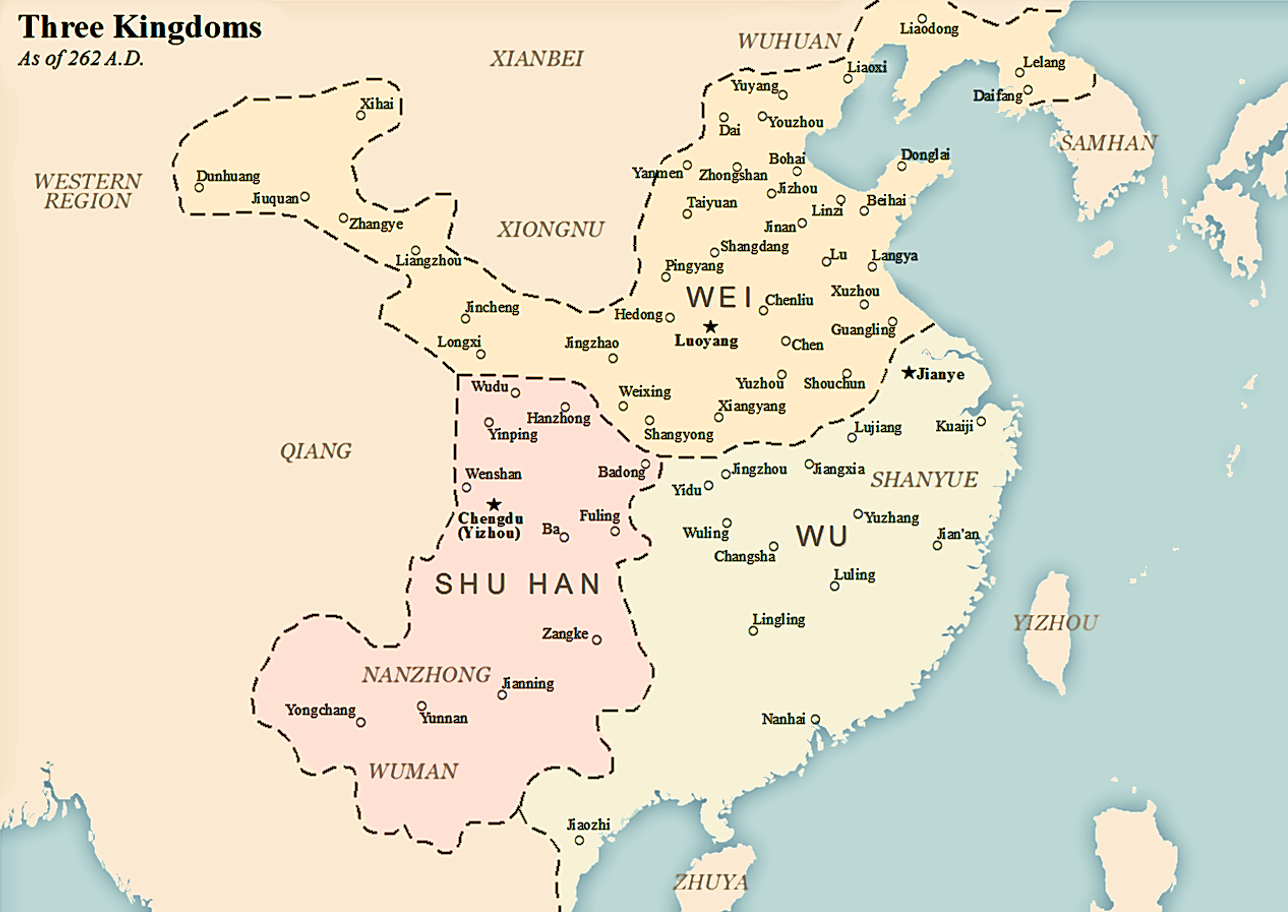
- The territories of Shu Han (in light pink), as of 262 A.D.
- Capital: Chengdu
- Common languages: Ba–Shu Chinese; Eastern Han Chinese
- Religion: Taoism, Confucianism, Chinese folk religion
- Government: Monarchy
- Emperor
  - 221 – 223: Liu Bei
  - 223 – 263: Liu Shan
- Historical era: Three Kingdoms
  - Established: May 221
  - Conquest of Shu by Wei: c.Dec 263 AD

Population
  - 221: 900,000
  - 263: 1,082,000
- Currency: Ancient Chinese coinage, Chinese cash
Preceded by	Succeeded by
Eastern Han	Cao Wei
- Today part of: China

Shu Han
- Traditional Chinese: 蜀漢
- Simplified Chinese: 蜀汉
- Hanyu Pinyin: Shǔ Hàn
Transcriptions
Standard Mandarin
- Hanyu Pinyin: Shǔ Hàn
- Bopomofo: ㄕㄨˇ ㄏㄢˋ
- Gwoyeu Romatzyh: Shuu Hann
- Wade–Giles: Shu^{3} Han^{4}
- Tongyong Pinyin: Shǔ Hàn
- IPA: [ʂù xân]
Yue: Cantonese
- Yale Romanization: Suhk Hon
- Jyutping: Suk6 Hon3
- IPA: [sʊk̚˨ hɔn˧]

Han (漢; 221–263 AD), known in historiography as Shu Han (蜀漢 [ʂù xân]) or Ji Han (季漢 "Junior Han"), or often shortened to Shu (Chinese: 蜀; pinyin: Shǔ; Sichuanese Pinyin: Su^{2} < Middle Chinese: *źjowk < Eastern Han Chinese: *dźok), was a dynastic state of China and one of the three major states that competed for supremacy over China in the Three Kingdoms period. The state was based in the area around present-day Hanzhong, Sichuan, Chongqing, Yunnan, Guizhou, and north Guangxi, an area historically referred to as "Shu" based on the name of the past ancient kingdom of Shu, which also occupied this approximate geographical area. Its core territory also coincided with Liu Bang's Kingdom of Han, the precursor of the Han dynasty.

Shu Han's founder, Liu Bei (Emperor Zhaolie), had named his dynasty "Han", as he considered it a rump state of the Han dynasty and thus the legitimate successor to the Han throne, while the prefix "Shu" was first used by the rival state of Cao Wei to delegitimize the claims of the Shu Han state to orthodox succession. Later on when writing the Records of the Three Kingdoms, the historian, Chen Shou, also used the prefix "Shu" to describe Liu Bei's state of Han as a historiographical prefix to differentiate it from the many other states officially named "Han" throughout Chinese history.

== History ==
=== Beginnings and founding ===
Towards the end of the Eastern Han dynasty, Liu Bei, a warlord and distant relative of the Han imperial clan, rallied the support of many capable followers. Following the counsel of his advisor, Zhuge Liang, and Zhuge's Longzhong Plan, Liu Bei conquered parts of Jing Province (covering present-day Hubei and Hunan) in 208 and 209, took over Yi Province (covering present-day Sichuan and Chongqing) from the warlord Liu Zhang between 212 and 214, and wrestled control of Hanzhong from his rival, Cao Cao, in 219. Afterwards, Liu Bei proclaimed himself King of Hanzhong.

From the territories he gained, Liu Bei established a position for himself in China during the final years of the Han dynasty. However, in 219, the alliance between Liu Bei and his ally, Sun Quan, was broken when Sun sent his general, Lü Meng, to invade Jing Province. Liu Bei lost his territories in Jing Province to Sun Quan. Guan Yu, the general guarding Liu Bei's assets in Jing Province, was captured and subsequently executed by Sun Quan's forces.

Cao Cao died in 220, and was succeeded by his son, Cao Pi, who forced the last Han ruler, Emperor Xian, to abdicate the throne in his favour. Cao Pi then established the state of Cao Wei, and declared himself emperor. Liu Bei contested Cao Pi's claim to the throne, and proclaimed himself "Emperor of Han" in 221. Although Liu Bei is widely seen as the founder of Shu Han, he never claimed to be the founder of a new dynasty; rather, he viewed Shu Han as a continuation of the Han dynasty.

To distinguish the state from other historical Chinese states of the same name, historians have added a relevant character to the state's original name: the state that called itself "Han" (漢) is also known as "Shu Han" (蜀漢) or just "Shu" (蜀).

=== Liu Bei's reign ===
Liu Bei ruled as emperor for less than three years. In 222, he launched a campaign against Sun Quan to retake Jing Province and avenge Guan Yu, culminating in the Battle of Xiaoting. However, due to grave tactical mistakes, Liu Bei suffered a crushing defeat at the hands of Sun Quan's general, Lu Xun, and lost the bulk of his army. He survived the battle and retreated to Baidicheng, where he died from illness a year later.

=== Liu Shan's reign ===
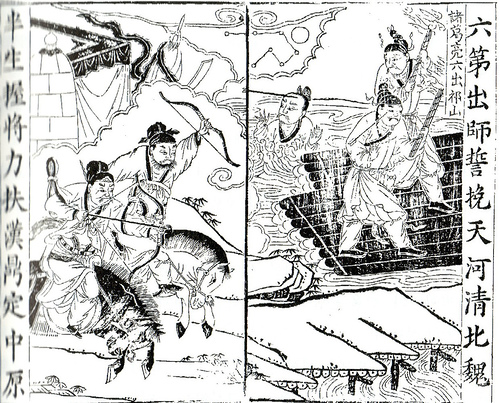
A Qing dynasty illustration of a battle between Wei and Shu at the banks of the Wei River. Many battles were fought between Shu and Wei in the Three Kingdoms period.

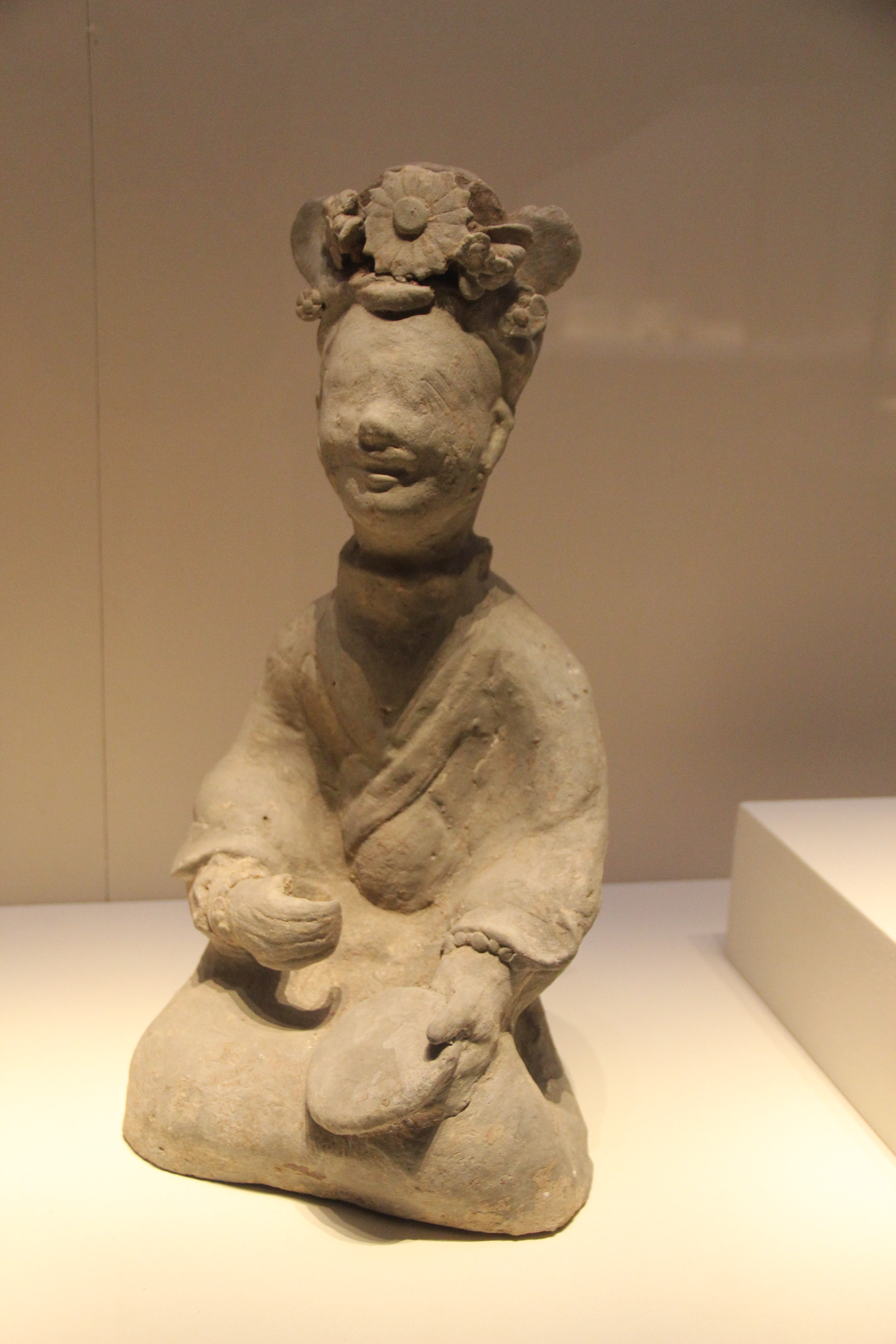
Pottery musician, Shu, Three Kingdoms.

Before Liu Bei's death, he appointed the chancellor Zhuge Liang and the general Li Yan as regents to his son, Liu Shan. The young Liu Shan was only 16 years old, making him the youngest of the rulers of the Three Kingdom states, and Liu Bei expected the two regents to assist Liu Shan in managing state affairs. Zhuge Liang was the de facto head of the Shu government throughout Liu Shan's reign, and was responsible for most of Shu's policies during his regency.

When Liu Shan succeeded his father, Shu was the weakest of the three major powers. Following his father's defeat in 221, the portion of Jing Province previously held by Shu was now firmly under the control of Wu. Shu only included the western lands of Yi Province, while Wei controlled all of the northern lands, and Wu controlled all the lands from the east of Yi Province to the southern and eastern coastlines. Meanwhile, Shu's population was not large enough to stand against the rival state of Wei. This greatly limited Shu in terms of resources and manpower; although the country could efficiently defend itself, Shu could not easily launch successful campaigns. As such, Zhuge Liang parleyed for peace with Wu, and reaffirmed the alliance between Sun Quan and Shu — with the former even recognising Sun Quan's legitimacy when the latter broke with Wei, and declared himself "Emperor of Wu" in 229. In order to strengthen the Shu Han state's authority in the remote southern region of Nanzhong, Zhuge Liang also launched an expeditionary force there in 225 to quell local rebellions, and the growing influence of the Nanman (literal: southern barbarians) in the region.

Zhuge Liang advocated an aggressive foreign policy towards Wei, because he strongly believed it was critical to the survival of Shu and its sovereignty. Between the years of 228 and 234, he launched a series of five military campaigns against Wei, with the aim of conquering Chang'an, a strategic city located on the road to the Wei capital, Luoyang. Most of the battles were fought around present-day Gansu and Shaanxi provinces. However, aside from gaining Jiang Wei as an officer in 228, and the Wudu and Yinping commanderies, Shu failed to achieve any significant victories or lasting gains in the five expeditions. During his final campaign where he fought against the Wei general, Sima Yi, an already taxed and ill Zhuge Liang died under the strain of the long stalemate with the Wei forces at the Battle of Wuzhang Plains.

After Zhuge Liang's death, the Shu government was then headed by Jiang Wan, Fei Yi, and others, and Shu temporarily ceased its aggression towards Wei. In 244, the Wei regent, Cao Shuang, launched an invasion of Hanzhong. Despite being outnumbered 2-to-1, the Shu forces defeated the invading combatants at the Battle of Xingshi, with the humiliated Wei forces fleeing. Between 247 and 262, the Shu general, Jiang Wei, resumed Zhuge Liang's legacy by leading a series of military campaigns against Wei, but also failed to make any significant territorial gains.

=== Fall of Shu ===
In 263, armies led by the Wei generals Deng Ai and Zhong Hui attacked Shu, and conquered its capital, Chengdu, without much struggle — the state having been exhausted by Jiang Wei's ill-fated campaigns. In the same year, Liu Shan surrendered to Deng Ai outside Chengdu, marking the end of Shu. In spite of this, Jiang Wei attempted to incite conflict between Deng Ai and Zhong Hui, in the hope of taking advantage of the situation to revive Shu. Zhong Hui captured Deng Ai, and openly rebelled against the Wei regent, Sima Zhao, but the revolt was suppressed by Wei forces. Jiang Wei, Zhong Hui, and Deng Ai were killed in the struggle.

Liu Shan was brought to Luoyang, where he met with Sima Zhao, and was awarded the title of "Duke of Anle." He lived a comfortable and peaceful life in Luoyang until the end of his days.

== Economy ==
Shu was not merely a nation at war. During peacetime, the Shu state began many irrigation and road-building projects designed to improve the economy. Many of these public works still exist and are widely used. For example, the Zipingpu Dam is still present near Chengdu, Sichuan. These works helped improve the economy of southwestern China, and can be seen as the beginning of economic activity in Sichuan. It also promoted trade with southern China, which was then ruled by Eastern Wu.

== List of territories ==
Yi Province (益州)
Commandery	Counties
Shu 蜀	Chengdu 成都
Shu 蜀	Fan 繁
Shu 蜀	Jiangyuan 江原
Shu 蜀	Linqiong 臨邛
Shu 蜀	Pi 郫
Zitong 梓潼	Zitong 梓潼
Zitong 梓潼	Fu 涪
Zitong 梓潼	Hande 漢德
Zitong 梓潼	Hanshou 漢壽
Zitong 梓潼	Boshui 白水
Guanghan 廣漢	Luo 雒
Guanghan 廣漢	Shifang 什邡
Guanghan 廣漢	Mianzhu 綿竹
Guanghan 廣漢	Xindu 新都
Guanghan 廣漢	Yangquan 陽泉
Han 漢	Qi 郪
Han 漢	Deyang 德陽
Han 漢	Wucheng 五城
Han 漢	Guanghan 廣漢
Wenshan 汶山	Wenshan 汶山
Wenshan 汶山	Jiandi 湔氐
Wenshan 汶山	Du'an 都安
Wenshan 汶山	Miansi 綿虒
Wenshan 汶山	Pingkang 平康
Wenshan 汶山	Canling 蠶陵
Wenshan 汶山	Guangrou 廣柔
Wenshan 汶山	Boma 白馬
Ba 巴	Jiangzhou 江州
Ba 巴	Dianjiang 墊江
Ba 巴	Linjiang 臨江
Ba 巴	Zhi 枳
Baxi 巴西	Langzhong 閬中
Baxi 巴西	Xichong (state) 西充國
Baxi 巴西	Nanchong (state) 南充國
Baxi 巴西	Hanchang 漢昌
Baxi 巴西	Xuanhan 宣漢
Baxi 巴西	Anhan 安漢
Baxi 巴西	Dangqu 宕渠
Badong 巴東	Yong'an (Yufu) 永安 (魚復)
Badong 巴東	Quren 朐忍
Badong 巴東	Yangqu 羊渠
Badong 巴東	Beijing 北井
Badong 巴東	Handan 漢單
Badong 巴東	Wu 巫
Fuling 涪陵	Hanfu 漢復
Fuling 涪陵	Fuling 涪陵
Fuling 涪陵	Hanping 漢平
Fuling 涪陵	Hanjia 漢葭
Fuling 涪陵	Wanning 萬寧
Jianwei 犍為	Wuyang 武陽
Jianwei 犍為	Nan'an 南安
Jianwei 犍為	Bodao 僰道
Jianwei 犍為	Zizhong 資中
Jianwei 犍為	Niubing 牛鞞
Jiangyang 江陽	Jiangyang 江陽
Jiangyang 江陽	Fu 符
Jiangyang 江陽	Han'an 漢安
Hanjia 漢嘉	Hanjia 漢嘉
Hanjia 漢嘉	Xi 徙
Hanjia 漢嘉	Yandao 嚴道
Hanjia 漢嘉	Maoniu 旄牛

Territories conquered by Shu from Wei
Commandery	Counties
Hanzhong 漢中	Nanzheng 南鄭
Hanzhong 漢中	Baozhong 褒中
Hanzhong 漢中	Mianyang 沔陽
Hanzhong 漢中	Chenggu 成固
Hanzhong 漢中	Nanxiang 南鄉
Wudu 武都	Xiabian 下辯
Wudu 武都	Hechi 河池
Wudu 武都	Ju 沮
Wudu 武都	Wudu 武都
Wudu 武都	Gudao 故道
Wudu 武都	Qiangdao 羌道
Yinping 陰平	Yinping 陰平
Yinping 陰平	Pingguang 平廣

Nanzhong (南中)
Commandery	Counties
Shushi 朱提	Shushi 朱提
Shushi 朱提	Nanguang 南廣
Shushi 朱提	Hanyang 漢陽
Shushi 朱提	Nanchang 南昌
Shushi 朱提	Tanglang 堂狼
Yuexi 越巂	Huiwu 會無
Yuexi 越巂	Qiongdu 邛都
Yuexi 越巂	Beishui 卑水
Yuexi 越巂	Dingzha 定苲
Yuexi 越巂	Taideng 臺登
Yuexi 越巂	Anshang 安上
Yuexi 越巂	Xindao 新道
Yuexi 越巂	Qianjie 潛街
Yuexi 越巂	Sanfeng 三縫
Yuexi 越巂	Suqi 蘇祁
Yuexi 越巂	Chan 闡
Zangke 牂柯	Qielan 且蘭
Zangke 牂柯	Tanzhi 談指
Zangke 牂柯	Yelang 夜郎
Zangke 牂柯	Wulian 毋斂
Zangke 牂柯	Bi 鄨
Zangke 牂柯	Pingyi 平夷
Zangke 牂柯	Guangtan 廣談
Yunnan 雲南	Yunnan 雲南
Yunnan 雲南	Longdong 梇棟
Yunnan 雲南	Qingling 青蛉
Yunnan 雲南	Gufu 姑復
Yunnan 雲南	Xielong 邪龍
Yunnan 雲南	Yeyu 楪榆
Yunnan 雲南	Suijiu 遂久
Xinggu 興古	Juting 句町
Xinggu 興古	Wanwen 宛溫
Xinggu 興古	Louwo 漏臥
Xinggu 興古	Bengu 賁古
Xinggu 興古	Hanxing 漢興
Xinggu 興古	Jincheng 進乘
Xinggu 興古	Xifeng 西豐
Xinggu 興古	Xisui 西隨
Xinggu 興古	Duofeng 鐸封
Jianning 建寧	Wei 味
Jianning 建寧	Cun (Mayi) 存 (馬邑)
Jianning 建寧	Mudan 母單
Jianning 建寧	Tonglai 同瀨
Jianning 建寧	Muma 牧麻
Jianning 建寧	Guchang 穀昌
Jianning 建寧	Lianran 連然
Jianning 建寧	Qinzang 秦臧
Jianning 建寧	Shuangbai 雙柏
Jianning 建寧	Yuyuan 俞元
Jianning 建寧	Xiuyun 修雲
Jianning 建寧	Dianchi 滇池
Jianning 建寧	Tonglao 同勞
Jianning 建寧	Tongjing 同井
Jianning 建寧	Shengxiu 勝休
Jianning 建寧	Jianling 建伶
Yongchang 永昌	Buwei 不韋
Yongchang 永昌	Yongshou 永壽
Yongchang 永昌	Bisu 比蘇
Yongchang 永昌	Nanfu 南涪
Yongchang 永昌	Suitang 巂唐
Yongchang 永昌	Ailao 哀牢
Yongchang 永昌	Bonan 博南

== List of emperors ==
Shu Han rulers
Temple name	Posthumous name	Family name (in bold) and personal name	Reign	Era names and their year ranges	Notes
Liezu 烈祖	Emperor Zhaolie 昭烈皇帝	**Liu** Bei 劉備	221–223	Zhangwu 章武 (221–223)	Liu Bei is also referred to as the "Late Emperor" (先帝) in some historical texts.
(N/A)	Emperor Xiaohuai 孝懷皇帝	**Liu** Shan 劉禪	223–263	Jianxing 建興 (223–237); Yanxi 延熙 (238–257); Jingyao 景耀 (258–263); Yanxing 炎興 (263)	Liu Shan was posthumously granted the title of "Duke Si of Anle" (安樂思公) by the Jin dynasty. He was later posthumously honoured as "Emperor Xiaohuai" (孝懷皇帝) by Liu Yuan, the founder of the Han-Zhao state of the Sixteen Kingdoms. He is also referred to as the "Later Lord" (後主) in some historical texts.

== See also ==
- Shu (kingdom)
- Former Shu
- Later Shu
