= Saoqing Niang =

Weather deity in Chinese folk religion

Saoqing Niang (simplified Chinese: 扫晴娘; traditional Chinese: 掃晴娘; pinyin: Sǎoqíng Niáng; lit. 'Lady who sweeps the sky clear') is a female figure in Chinese folklore. People make paper images of her to pray for clear weather when rain continues for many days. She is shown wearing red or green clothes and holding a small broom. The figures are hung under roofs or on trees. The custom is found in many parts of China.

The Japanese teru teru bōzu is sometimes said to have come from the Saoqing Niang custom. Both are hung outside to pray for good weather.

== Legends ==
One of the oldest written accounts of Saoqing Niang comes from the poem Saoqing Fu (掃晴婦) by the 13th-century poet Li Junmin (李俊民). The poem describes a paper woman holding a broom and hanging under a cloudy sky. The Qing dynasty scholar Zhao Yi (趙翼) quoted the poem in his Gaiyu Congkao (陔餘叢考):

卷袖搴裳手持帚，掛向陰空便搖手。
Translation: "She rolls up her sleeves and lifts her skirt, holding a broom. Hung under the cloudy sky, she waves her hand."

Zhao Yi also wrote that people in the Jiangnan region hung paper women under their roofs to pray for clear weather. He noted that Li Junmin came from Zezhou, in northern China, showing that the custom was also known there.

The custom was also recorded during the Ming dynasty. In Dijing Jingwulüe (帝京景物略), Liu Tong (劉侗) and Yu Yizheng (于奕正) wrote that people made a woman's head from white paper and dressed it in red and green paper clothes. They gave her a small broom and hung her from the roof when the rain would not stop.

The Qing dynasty writer Fucha Duncong (富察敦崇) described the custom in Yanjing Suishiji (燕京歲時記):

六月乃大雨時行之際。凡遇連陰不止者，則閨中兒女剪紙為人，懸於門左，謂之掃晴娘。
Translation: "The sixth lunar month is a time of heavy rain. When the rain does not stop, young women cut paper into human figures and hang them on the left side of the doorway. They call these Saoqing Niang."

The custom was known in both northern and southern China. The paper figures often wore red or green clothes and held small brooms. People hung them from roofs or trees and prayed for the rain to stop.

A folk tale from Beijing tells of a beautiful young woman named Qingniang (晴娘), who was skilled at paper-cutting. One year, heavy rain flooded the city. The people prayed for the rain to stop, but it continued. One night, Qingniang prayed to heaven. A voice told her that the Dragon King of the East Sea wanted her to marry his son. If she refused, the Dragon King would flood the city. Qingniang agreed to save the people. A strong wind came, and she disappeared. The rain then stopped. People made paper figures of Qingniang and hung them outside their homes to remember her and pray for clear weather.

Another version says that a young woman was offered as a sacrifice to stop the rain. After she disappeared, the sky cleared. The people then made paper figures in her memory.

In parts of Henan, a similar figure was called Saotian Niangniang (掃天娘娘, "Sky-Sweeping Goddess"). A 1931 account from Xingyang described a small woman made from sorghum stalks and dressed in yellow paper clothes. She was tied to a tree while people sang prayers for clear weather. The yellow clothes were worn because she was called Niangniang, a title used for goddesses.

A different story appears in the 1938 book Manshū Shina no Shūzoku (満洲・支那の習俗) by the Japanese folklorist Nagao Ryūzō. It tells of a young woman named Zhang Zigu (張紫姑), who lived with her elderly parents. One year, heavy rain continued for many days. Many houses were damaged, and her family's home was close to falling down. Zigu went outside with a broom and began sweeping towards the sky while praying for the clouds to clear. The rain stopped, but she became ill from standing in the rain and later died. The villagers built a small shrine for her and helped care for her parents. She became known as Zigu Shen (紫姑神) or Saoqing Niang.

In Longcheng, Qin'an County, Gansu, a local legend identifies the goddess Nüwa with Saoyun Niangniang (掃雲娘娘, "Cloud-Sweeping Goddess"). According to the story, dark clouds covered the sky when the crops were ready for harvest. The villagers feared that heavy rain would destroy their crops and prayed to Nüwa for help. She flew into the sky with a large broom and swept the clouds away. The sky cleared, and the villagers called her Saoyun Niangniang.

== Customs ==
When rain continued for many days, people made paper figures of Saoqing Niang and hung them outside their homes to pray for clear weather. The figures were usually made in the shape of a woman wearing red or green clothes and holding a small broom. They were hung under the eaves or from tree branches. People believed that Saoqing Niang could sweep away the rain clouds. They prayed for clear weather so they could dry their grain and travel.

In Henan, people also sang songs to Saoqing Niang while praying for the rain to stop. One rhyme says:

扫晴娘，扫晴娘，三天扫晴啦，给你穿花衣裳。三天扫不晴，扎你的光脊梁。 Translation: "Saoqing Niang, Saoqing Niang, if you clear the sky in three days, we will give you beautiful clothes. If you fail, we will prick your bare back."

In Huaiyang, Henan, people made a woman from sorghum stalks and gave her a small broom. They tied the figure to a tree in the yard and sang to it three times a day, in the morning, at noon, and in the evening. The song promised to give Saoqing Niang red and green clothes if she brought clear weather.

The Japanese Teru teru bōzu (てるてる坊主) is often said to have come from the Chinese Saoqing Niang custom. Unlike Saoqing Niang, which takes the form of a woman, the Japanese doll has a round head and looks like a Buddhist monk. The custom was recorded in Japan during the Edo period. Some accounts say that Saoqing Niang reached Japan during the Heian period, but there is no clear evidence for this date. It is not known exactly when or how the custom reached Japan.
