= Wen Ping =

Early 3rd century Chinese general

- 文聘

Administrator of Jiangxia (江夏太守)
- In office 220 – ?
- Monarch: Cao Pi
- In office c. 208 – 220
- Monarch: Emperor Xian of Han
- Chancellor: Cao Cao
- Preceded by: Liu Qi

General Who Attacks Rebels (討逆將軍)
- In office ? – 222

General of the Rear (後將軍)
- In office c. 222–?
- Monarch: Cao Pi

Personal details
- Born: Unknown Nanyang, Henan
- Died: between October 226 and August 243
- Relations: Wen Hou (nephew)
- Children: Wen Dai; Wen Xiu (adopted son)
- Occupation: General
- Courtesy name: Zhongye (仲業)
- Posthumous name: Marquis Zhuang (壯侯)
- Peerage: Marquis of Xinye (新野侯)

Wen Ping (Chinese: 文聘; pinyin: Wén Pìn; fl.208 - 240s), courtesy name Zhongye, was a military general who lived during the late Eastern Han dynasty and Three Kingdoms period of China. During his tenure as a general under the warlord Cao Cao, he was credited with defeating the enemy general Guan Yu and defending Cao Cao's interests in Jiangxia Commandery from the eastern warlord Sun Quan.

== Early life ==
Wen Ping was from Wan County (宛縣), which is in present-day Nanyang, Henan. He originally served under Liu Biao, the Governor of Jing Province, and was tasked with defending the province's northern frontier, stationed at Xiangyang. In 208, after Liu Biao's death, his younger son and successor Liu Cong surrendered to the warlord Cao Cao, who was the de facto head of the Han central government. When Liu Cong went to greet Cao Cao, he passed by Wen Ping's camp and urged him to come with but Wen Ping replied "I could not defend the province, and must go face my failure and nothing more". Once when Cao Cao crossed the Han River did Wen Ping go to meet the warlord. When Cao Cao asked him why he surrendered so late, he weepingly replied "In former days, I failed to assist Liu Biao serve the state. Though Liu Biao is dead, I was still hoping to hold the line of the Han and maintain that territory intact. That way, if I lived I would not be turning my back on the orphaned and weak, and if I died there would be no shame below the ground. The decision, however, has been taken out of my hands, and so we come to this. Indeed, I am sad and ashamed and I could not face coming to audience any earlier". Cao Cao praised Wen Pin's loyalty and returned his military command, later commentator Sun Sheng admired how the former officer of Lü Bu, Zang Baand Wen Ping were entrusted so quickly with major commands because of their loyal behaviour rather than just their ability as military men.

== Service under Cao Cao ==
Wen Ping was sent with cavalry commander Cao Chun to pursue Cao Cao's fleeing rival, Liu Bei, and caught up with him at the Battle of Changban. However, Liu Bei managed to escape and form an alliance with the eastern warlord Sun Quan. In the winter of 208–209, the allied forces of Sun Quan and Liu Bei defeated Cao Cao's forces at the decisive Battle of Red Cliffs. After his defeat, Cao Cao was concerned about local loyalties with concerns about Eastern Wu's expansion so appointed Wen Ping as the Administrator of Jiangxia Commandery (commandery capital in present-day Xinzhou District, Wuhan, Hubei), which was located strategically near the border between Cao Cao and Sun Quan's territories and rivaled veteran Sun general Cheng Pu's claim to the area. Cao Cao also had Emperor Xian, the figurehead Han emperor, enoff Wen Ping as a Secondary Marquis (關內侯), the lowest among the marquis ranks of the Han dynasty.

In 209, Cao Cao's general Cao Ren was forced to withdraw from the Yangtze after the long battle Battle of Jiangling against Sun Quan's forces led by the general Zhou Yu. Cao Cao losst his outpost on the Yangtze and Cao Cao's position forced back 150 kilometeres. with Wen Ping in command in the eastern flank at Jiangxia Commandery against Sun Quan and rival claimant Cheng Pu. Liu Bei's general Guan Yu was another claimant in Jing, Wen Ping and his colleague Yue Jin, station at Xiangyang, defeated Guan Yu at Xunkou (尋口). In recognition of his contributions in battle, the Han imperial court promoted Wen Ping to a village marquis under the title "Marquis of Yanshou Village" (延壽亭侯) and awarded him the appointment of General Who Attacks Rebels (討逆將軍). Wen Ping launched further raids, destroying Guan Yu's supply train at Han Ford (漢津) and burnt his fleet at Jingcheng.

== Service under Cao Pi ==
After Cao Cao's death in 220, his eldest living son Cao Pi became emperor of the Cao Wei state after Emperor Xian abdicated, as part of the rewards of the new regime Wen Ping was given a staff of authority and raised in fiefdom to "Marquis of Chang'an District" (長安鄉侯). In 222, with Lu Xun's victory against Liu Bei at the Battle of Xiaoting removing a threat from King Sun Quan's borders, the Wu ruler refused to send his son Sun Deng as hostage to Wei court. Cao Pi formulated a plan for a three-pronged attack on Sun Quan, ordering Wen Ping to join the generals Zhang He, Xu Huang, Xiahou Shang and Cao Zhen in attacking Sun Quan's stronghold at Jiangling.

Like the last battle at Jiangling, the Wei forces enjoyed numerical advantage, but this time, they were on the offensive. However, the Wei forces ultimately did not make much progress because the defenders under Zhu Ran put up a strong resistance. Wu sent a series of reinforcements and against one (commander unknown) of those waves, Wen Ping was sent with his detachment to defend Miankou, winning at Shifan. Cao Pi eventually called off the attack on Jiangling due to epidemic through Wei ranks and rewarded Wen Pin with a promotion to General of the Rear (後將軍), in addition to elevating him from a district marquis to a county marquis under the title "Marquis of Xinye" (新野侯).

== Service under Cao Rui and legacy ==
Wu had avoided attacking Wen Ping's position at his capital of Shiyang (石陽), something Wei recorded credited due to his fame shaking Wu after decades of good service. There was one exception, in the autumn of 226 after the death of Cao Pi with his son Cao Rui new to the throne. Sun Quan sought to take advantage on hearing the news and led 50,000 troops against Wei Ping's capital. There are two versions of what exactly happened. In the main Sanguozhi, Wen Ping was besieged for over twenty days but put up a resilient defence. Word reached the Cao Wei court but Cao Rui was confident since he believed Sun Quan had only attacked in the hopes of catching the defenders by surprise and wouldn't dare stay too long, now that he was engaged in a siege with Wen Ping. The official Xun Yu was dispatched with a thousand troops and he gathered more from the counties he passed through on the way to Jiangxia. On arrival, Xun Yu and his army took to the hills, setting fires as a show of force. Sun Quan retreated and Wen Ping pursued during the night, inflicting casualties with the isolated enemy general Pan Zhang having to be rescued by Zhu Ran. For his victory, Wei Ping's fief was increased by 500 households.

The Cao Wei historian Yu Huan provides an alternative account in his Weilüe. Sun Quan led tens of thousands against Shiyang where heavy rains had damaged the walls while the people were scattered among the fields so repairs could not be carried out in time. Without the walls and outnumbered, Wen Ping was in a bind but then thought that, if it seemed nobody was in the city, Sun Quan would get suspicious and expect a ploy. Wen Ping had everyone hide and remained in his residence. Sun Quan was puzzled since the Cao Wei court would not leave such an important post in the hands of a figure they did not trust so Wei Ping's lack of reaction to an invading army must be due to a ploy or knowing reinforcements were coming so Sun Quan ordered an immediate withdrawal. Pei Songzhi notes the account contradicts the base text of Chen Shou.

== Death and legacy ==
The defence of Shiyang would be his last known battle but it is not known when Wen Ping died. After his death, he was honored with the posthumous title "Marquis Zhuang" (壯侯) by the Wei government. In August 243, with the young Cao Fang on the throne under the regency of Cao Shuang and Sima Yi, sacrifices were made at the temple dedicated to Cao Cao to a select group of former officers, including Wen Ping. Chen Shou, in his commentary in the Sanguozhi, listed him alongside Li Tong, Zang Ba and Lü Qian as figures of authority who governed their respective lands well.

His adopted son, Wen Xiu (文休), inherited his marquis title ("Marquis of Xinye") because his biological son, Wen Dai (文岱), died early. Wen Xiu was in turn succeeded by his son, Wen Wu (文武), after his death. Wen Ping also had a nephew, Wen Hou (文厚), who was enfeoffed as a secondary marquis and would fall out with Lu Shi (逯式), in charge of Jiangxia, a divide the Wu general Lu Xun exploited in faking a letter that Lu Shi was going to defect due to the split, undermining Lu Shi's position.

== In Romance of the Three Kingdoms ==
Wen Ping first appears in chapter 34, he and Wang Wei recommended by Kuai Yue to hold a banquet for military officers so Zhao Yun would have to attend, allowing Cai Mao to attempt to kill Liu Bei without his bodyguard though, thanks to a tip off, the attempt to kill Liu Bei would fail. He next appears after Liu Cong surrenders, Liu Bei appears at the regime's capital of Xiangyang to seek a meeting and Wei Yan opens the gates. Wen Ping takes some horsemen to stop him and fights Wei Yan, Liu Bei is concerned by this reception and leaves. The battle between Wei Yan and Wen Ping lasts for some hours with most combatants dead before Wei Yan flees. Refuses to go to Cao Cao, then the weeping submission scene, immediately made Governor of Jiangxia and enoffed.

Takes part in pursuit of Liu Bei at Changban, intercepting Liu Bei but is ashamed when Liu Bei calls him a turncoat and retreats. When Zhao Yun rescues the infant Liu Shan and fights his way back to Liu Bei, Wen Ping pursues but halts when they come against Zhang Fei's fierce appearance on the bridge and what they fear is an ambush. At Chibi, as a man used to the waters, given command of the left squadron of the naval forces, dispatched with thirty ships to support Jiao Chu and Zhang Neng's unsuccessful attack, battles the naval forces of Han Dang and Zhou Tai but soon discovers his forces are outmatched so retreat. Sent to intercept Huang Gai's approaching ships as Cheng Yu realizes the defection is fake, however Wen Ping is injured by an arrow to the arm and his forces collapse with Huang Gai launching his fire attack on the main fleet. Is able to escape with Mao Jie and a few horsemen to rejoin Cao Cao on the troubled march home.

Takes part in archery contest to celebrate opening of the Bronze Bird Terrace in Ye, impressing as he hits bulls-eye at full gallop. Takes part in the defense of Hanzhong, when Huang Zhong attempts to raid the supply lines the attackers are surrounded and Zhang Zhu's attempt to return to camp is intercepted by Wen Ping but Zhao Yun arrives to drive off Wei Ping's men with subordinate Murong Lie killed. In 224, with Cao Cao dead and Cao Pi having taken the throne, made a chief commander for campaign against Eastern Wu who were negotiating to restore alliance with Shu-Han. Cao Pi's forces arrive at Guangling but are shocked as opposing commander Xu Sheng builds fake-walls overnight. As Cao Pi considers his options, his capital ship is hit by a storm and Cao Zhen sends Wen Ping to rescue those on the ship. Wen Ping's sailors were too scared by the storm so, with the great ship seeming likely to capsize, Wen Ping leapt on board and got Cao Pi to the safety of a small boat that took the Emperor to a creek to stay out the storm. With news coming of an attack by Zhao Yun in the north-east, Cao Pi retreats and Wen Ping's time in the novel ends.

== See also ==
- Lists of people of the Three Kingdoms
- Empty Fort Strategy
