= Empty Fort Strategy =

Chinese strategy

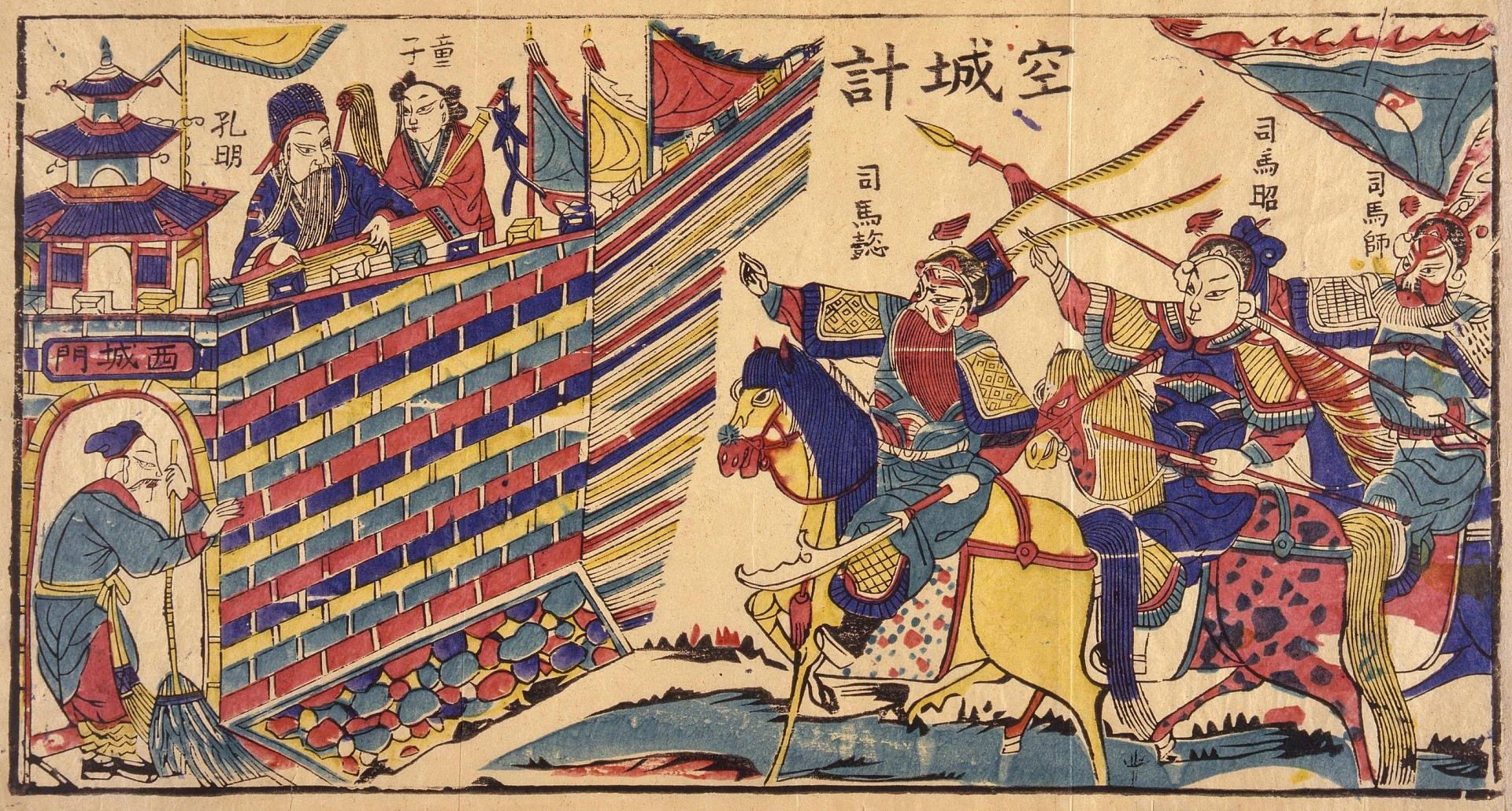
- Zhuge Liang against Sima Yi with his sons Sima Zhao and Sima Shi, as depicted in the artwork Ruse with an Empty City
- Traditional Chinese: 空城計
- Simplified Chinese: 空城计
Transcriptions
Standard Mandarin
- Hanyu Pinyin: Kōng Chéng Jì

The Empty Fort Strategy involves using reverse psychology to deceive the enemy into thinking that an empty location is full of traps and ambushes, and therefore induce the enemy to retreat. It is listed as the 32nd of the Thirty-Six Stratagems. Some examples are listed in the following sections.

== Cao Cao ==
According to the Sanguozhi, in 195, the Empty Fort Strategy was used by the warlord Cao Cao against his rival Lü Bu in one incident at Chengshi County (乘氏縣; southwest of present-day Juye County, Shandong). In the summer of that year, Lü Bu went to Dongmin County (東緡縣; northeast of present-day Jinxiang County, Shandong) and gathered about 10,000 troops to attack Cao Cao. At the time, Cao Cao had very few soldiers with him, but he set up an ambush and managed to defeat Lü Bu.

The Wei Shu (魏書) gave a more detailed account of the ambush. Cao Cao had sent most of his troops out to collect grain so he had less than 1,000 men available in his base, which could not be well defended with so few men. When Lü Bu showed up, Cao Cao ordered all his available soldiers to defend the base and even ordered women to stand guard on the walls. To the west of Cao Cao's base was a dyke, and to its south was a deep forest. Lü Bu suspected that there was an ambush, so he told his men, "Cao Cao is very cunning. We must not fall into his ambush." He then led his troops to 10 li (Chinese miles) south of Cao Cao's base and set up his camp there. The next day, Lü Bu came to attack Cao Cao, and by then, Cao Cao had really set up an ambush near the dyke with the soldiers that had returned from gathering the grain. Lü Bu's forces fell into the ambush and were defeated.

The "ambush" mentioned in the Sanguozhi refers to the ambush that Lü Bu's forces fell into a trap on the second day, as described in the Wei Shu. The incident is also mentioned in Sima Guang's Zizhi Tongjian. However, the Zizhi Tongjian account, which combined the Sanguozhi and Wei Shu accounts, did not mention the events on the first day – which were about Cao Cao sending all his available soldiers to defend the base and ordering women to stand guard on the walls.

=== Debate ===
Yi Zhongtian, a history professor from Xiamen University, commented on this incident in his book Pin San Guo (品三国) in response to criticism from Fudan University historian Zhou Zhenhe and an online commentator known as "Hongchayangweili" (红茶杨威利). Earlier on, Yi referred to this incident when he said in a lecture on the television programme Lecture Room that "Cao Cao's rights to the invention of the Empty Fort Strategy had been stolen from him". Zhou claimed that the Empty Fort Strategy had never been used in history before so there were no "rights" to its invention; the online commentator argued that the incident does not count as a use of the Empty Fort Strategy.

Yi defended his claim and said that the incident in 195 is valid because of the circumstances under which it was used, which were very similar to the incidents involving Zhao Yun and Wen Ping (see the sections below). Cao Cao was trying to confuse Lü Bu by making use of the geographical features (the "deep forest") and by ordering women to stand guard on the walls, so as to make Lü Bu suspect that he had set up an ambush in the "deep forest" and lure Lü Bu to attack his "weakly defended" base by deploying women as soldiers to show how "desperate" he was to set up a defence. The ploy worked because it made Lü Bu hesitate when he wanted to attack. Cao Cao had bought sufficient time to set up a real ambush, and he defeated Lü Bu when he came to attack again on the following day.

== Zhao Yun ==
The Zhao Yun Biezhuan (趙雲別傳; Unofficial Biography of Zhao Yun) mentioned an incident about Zhao Yun, a general under the warlord Liu Bei, using the Empty Fort Strategy during the Battle of Han River in 219, fought between Liu Bei and his rival Cao Cao as part of the Hanzhong Campaign.

This incident took place after Cao Cao's general Xiahou Yuan was defeated and killed in action at the earlier Battle of Mount Dingjun. Cao Cao's forces were transporting food supplies to the north hill when Liu Bei's general Huang Zhong, heard about it and led a group of soldiers, including some of Zhao Yun's men, to seize the supplies. When Huang Zhong did not return after a long time, Zhao Yun led tens of horsemen in search of Huang. Zhao Yun's search party encountered Cao Cao's forces and engaged them in battle but were outnumbered and was forced to retreat back to camp with Cao Cao's men in pursuit. Zhao Yun's subordinate Zhang Yi wanted to close the gates of the camp to prevent the enemy from entering. However, Zhao Yun gave orders for the gates to be opened, all flags and banners to be hidden, and the war drums silenced. Cao Cao's forces thought that there was an ambush inside Zhao Yun's camp so they withdrew. Just then, Zhao Yun launched a counterattack and his men beat the war drums loudly and fired arrows at the enemy. Cao Cao's soldiers were shocked and thrown into disarray. Some of them trampled on each other while fleeing in panic, and many of them fell into the Han River in their haste to get away and drowned. When Liu Bei came to inspect the camp later, he praised Zhao Yun and held a banquet to celebrate his victory.

== Wen Ping ==
The Weilüe mentioned an incident about the Empty Fort Strategy being used by a general Wen Ping during a battle between the forces of the states of Cao Wei and Eastern Wu in the Three Kingdoms period. It is not clear which battle this was, but it could have been the Battle of Jiangling of 223.

The Wu leader Sun Quan led thousands of troops to attack a fortress defended by the Wei general Wen Ping. At the time, there were heavy rains and many fortifications were damaged. The civilians in the fortress had retreated to the fields further back so they could not help with repairs to the fortifications, and some repairs were still uncompleted when Sun Quan arrived with his men. When Wen Ping heard that Sun Quan had arrived, he was unsure of what to do, but eventually formulated a plan to deceive him. He ordered everyone in the fortress to stay under cover while he hid behind the walls, creating an illusion of an empty fortress. As Wen Ping expected, Sun Quan became suspicious and he said to his subordinates, "The northerners regard this man (Wen Ping) as a loyal subject, which is why they entrusted him with defending this commandery. Now, as I approach, he does not make any move. It must be either that he has something up his sleeve or that his reinforcements have arrived." Sun Quan then withdrew his forces.

The historian Pei Songzhi commented that the Weilüe account did not match the original account in the Sanguozhi. The Sanguozhi mentioned: "Sun Quan led 50,000 troops to besiege Wen Ping at Shiyang (石陽). The situation was very critical but Wen Ping put up a firm defence. Sun Quan withdrew his forces after more than 20 days, and Wen Ping led his men to attack them as they were retreating and defeated them."

== Zhuge Liang ==
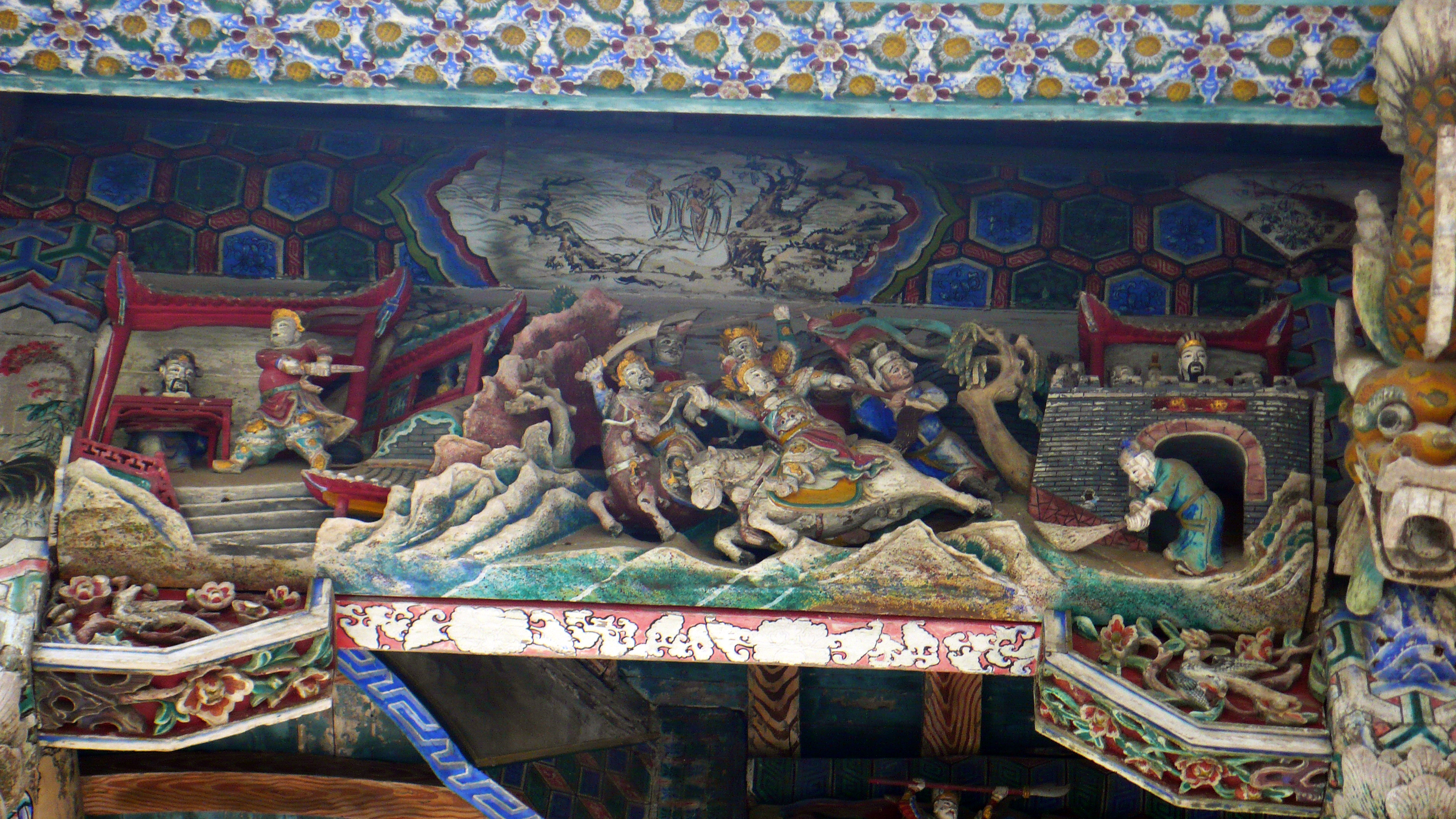
Wooden sculptures of Sima Yi's army fleeing from an old man sweeping in front of an empty city, in Huaxilou, Bozhou, Anhui

One of the best known examples of the use of the Empty Fort Strategy is a fictional incident in the novel Romance of the Three Kingdoms, which romanticises historical events in the late Han dynasty and the Three Kingdoms period. This event took place during the first of a series of campaigns – known as Zhuge Liang's Northern Expeditions – led by Shu Han's chancellor Zhuge Liang to attack Shu's rival state, Cao Wei.

In the first Northern Expedition, Zhuge Liang's efforts to conquer the Wei city Chang'an were undermined by the Shu defeat at the Battle of Jieting. With the loss of Jieting (present-day Qin'an County, Gansu), Zhuge Liang's current location, Xicheng (西城; believed to be located 120 li southwest of present-day Tianshui, Gansu), became exposed and was in danger of being attacked by the Wei army. In the face of imminent danger, with the main Shu army deployed elsewhere and only a small group of soldiers in Xicheng with him, Zhuge Liang came up with a ploy to hold off the approaching enemy.

Zhuge Liang ordered all the gates to be opened and instructed soldiers disguised as civilians to sweep the roads while he sat on the viewing platform above the gates with two page boys by his side. He put on a calm and composed image by playing his guqin. When the Wei army led by Sima Yi arrived, Sima was surprised by the sight before him and he ordered a retreat after suspecting that there was an ambush inside the city. Zhuge Liang later explained that his strategy was a risky one. It worked because Zhuge Liang had a reputation for being a careful military tactician who hardly took risks, so Sima Yi came to the conclusion that there was certainly an ambush upon seeing Zhuge's relaxed composure.

=== As a topic of academic study ===
Christopher Cotton, an economist from the Queen's University, and Chang Liu, a graduate student, used game theory to model the bluffing strategies used in the Chinese military legends of Li Guang and his 100 horsemen (144 BC), and Zhuge Liang and the Empty City (228 AD). In the case of these military legends, the researchers found that bluffing arose naturally as the optimal strategy in each situation. The findings were published under the title 100 Horsemen and the empty city: A game theoretic examination of deception in Chinese military legend in the Journal of Peace Research in 2011.

=== Historicity ===
The basis for this story in Romance of the Three Kingdoms is an anecdote shared by one Guo Chong (郭沖) in the early Jin dynasty (266–420). In the fifth century, Pei Songzhi added the anecdote as an annotation to Zhuge Liang's biography in the third-century historical text Sanguozhi. The anecdote is as follows:

Zhuge Liang garrisoned at Yangping (陽平; around present-day Hanzhong, Shaanxi) and ordered Wei Yan to lead the troops east. He left behind only 10,000 men to defend Yangping. Sima Yi led 200,000 troops to attack Zhuge Liang and he took a shortcut, bypassing Wei Yan's army and arriving at a place 60 li away from Zhuge Liang's location. Upon inspection, Sima Yi realised that Zhuge Liang's city was weakly defended. Zhuge Liang knew that Sima Yi was near, so he thought of recalling Wei Yan's army back to counter Sima Yi, but it was too late already and his men were worried and terrified. Zhuge Liang remained calm and instructed his men to hide all flags and banners and silence the war drums. He then ordered all the gates to be opened and told his men to sweep and dust the ground. Sima Yi knew that impression that Zhuge Liang was a cautious and prudent man, and he was baffled by the sight before him and suspected that there was an ambush. He then withdrew his troops. The following day, Zhuge Liang clapped his hands, laughed, and told an aide that Sima Yi thought that there was an ambush and had withdrawn. Later, his scouts returned and reported that Sima Yi had indeed retreated. Sima Yi was very upset when he later found out about the ruse.

After adding the anecdote to Zhuge Liang's biography, Pei Songzhi wrote a short commentary as follows:

When Zhuge Liang garrisoned at Yangping, Sima Yi was serving as the Area Commander of Jing Province and he was stationed at Wancheng (宛城; present-day Wancheng District, Nanyang, Henan). He only came into confrontation with Zhuge Liang in Guanzhong after Cao Zhen's death (in 231). It was unlikely that the Wei government ordered Sima Yi to lead an army from Wancheng to attack Shu via Xicheng (西城; present-day Ankang, Shaanxi) because there were heavy rains at the time (which obstructed passage). There were no battles fought at Yangping before and after that period of time. Going by Guo Chong's anecdote, if Sima Yi did lead 200,000 troops to attack Zhuge Liang, knew that Zhuge Liang's position was weakly defended, and suspected that there was an ambush, he could have ordered his troops to surround Zhuge Liang's position instead of retreating. Wei Yan's biography mentioned: "Each time Wei Yan followed Zhuge Liang to battle, he would request to command a separate detachment of about 10,000 men and take a different route and rendezvous with Zhuge Liang's main force at Tong Pass. Zhuge Liang rejected the plan, and Wei Yan felt that Zhuge Liang was a coward and complained that his talent was not put to good use." As mentioned in Wei Yan's biography, Zhuge Liang never agreed to allow Wei Yan to command a separate detachment of thousands of troops. If Guo Chong's anecdote was true, how was it possible that Zhuge Liang would allow Wei Yan to lead a larger army ahead while he followed behind with a smaller army? Guo Chong's anecdote was endorsed by the Prince of Fufeng (Sima Jun, a son of Sima Yi). However, the story puts Sima Yi in a negative light, and it does not make sense for a son to approve a story which demeans his father. We can tell that this anecdote is fake after reading the sentence "the Prince of Fufeng endorsed Guo Chong's anecdote".

Evidence from historical sources indicate that Sima Yi was indeed not in Jieting at the time. The Battle of Jieting took place in 228 but Sima Yi's biography in the Book of Jin claimed that in 227, Sima Yi was stationed at Wancheng in the north of Jing Province. He led an army to suppress a rebellion by Meng Da at Xincheng (新城; in present-day northwestern Hubei), and returned to Wancheng after his victory. Later, he went to the imperial capital Luoyang to meet the Wei emperor Cao Rui, who consulted him on some affairs before ordering him to return to Wancheng. Sima Yi only engaged Zhuge Liang in battle after 230.

Yi Zhongtian, a professor from Xiamen University, commented on this incident in his book Pin San Guo (品三国). He pointed out three problems in the story:

1. Sima Yi did not dare to attack because he feared that there was an ambush inside the fortress. If so, he could have sent scouts ahead to check if there was really an ambush.
2. Romance of the Three Kingdoms provided this description: "(Sima Yi) saw Zhuge Liang sitting at the top of the gates, smiling and playing his guqin and being oblivious to his surroundings." Based on this description, the distance between Sima Yi and Zhuge Liang must have been very short, or else Sima would not have been able to observe Zhuge's actions so clearly. If so, Sima Yi could have ordered an archer to kill Zhuge Liang.
3. Both Guo Chong's anecdote and Romance of the Three Kingdoms said that Sima Yi's army was superior to Zhuge Liang's in terms of size: Guo Chong's anecdote stated that Sima Yi had 200,000 men while Zhuge Liang had 10,000 men; Romance of the Three Kingdoms mentioned that Sima Yi had 150,000 men while Zhuge Liang had only 2,500 men. If so, Sima Yi could have ordered his troops to surround Zhuge Liang's fortress first, and then wait for an opportunity to attack.

== Li Yuan ==
According to historical sources such as the Old Book of Tang, New Book of Tang and Zizhi Tongjian, Li Yuan, the founding emperor of the Tang dynasty, used a similar strategy in 618 CE in a battle against the Göktürks before he started his rebellion against the Sui dynasty. In early 618, Li Yuan was still a general in the Sui army and was based in Jinyang (晉陽; present-day Taiyuan, Shanxi). When he heard rumours that Emperor Yang of Sui wanted to execute him, he started making preparations for a rebellion against the Sui dynasty to save himself. In May 618, the Göktürks allied with the warlord Liu Wuzhuo to attack the Sui dynasty in order to gain territory. Jinyang became one of their targets.

Around the time, Li Yuan had just arrested Wang Wei (王威) and Gao Junya (高君雅), two officials sent by Emperor Yang to spy on him. He was also still busy plotting his rebellion. Moreover, he was also not prepared for a battle against the Göktürks because of two reasons. Firstly, Göktürk cavalrymen were so powerful that Li Yuan was not confident that his troops could defeat them. Secondly, even if Li Yuan defeated them in battle, he would nonetheless suffer significant losses that would undermine his rebellion against the Sui dynasty.

Li Yuan thus ordered his soldiers to hide in Jinyang and leave the city gates wide open. Shibi Khan, leading a force of Göktürk cavalrymen, saw that the city appeared to be deserted and feared that there might be an ambush, so he did not enter. Li Yuan then ordered his son Li Shimin and subordinate Pei Ji to make their troops beat war drums loudly in the empty camps they had set up earlier, so as to create an illusion that reinforcements had arrived in Jinyang. Shibi Khan was so frightened that he retreated after two days.

== Battle of Mikatagahara ==
Many traditions say that in 1572, during the Sengoku Period in Japan, Tokugawa Ieyasu used the tactic during his retreat in the Battle of Mikatagahara. He commanded that the fortress gates remain open, and that braziers be lit to guide his retreating army back to safety. One officer beat a large war drum, seeking to add encouragement to the returning men of a noble, courageous retreat. When Takeda forces led by Baba Nobuharu and Yamagata Masakage heard the drums, and saw the braziers and open gates, they assumed that Tokugawa was planning a trap, and so they stopped and made camp for the night. The authenticity of this story has been disputed by some, however, as it appears to be copied straight from Zhuge Liang's story, perhaps in an attempt to embellish Tokugawa's career.
