= Battle of Jiangling (208) =

Battle between Sun Quan and Liu Bei against Cao Cao (208-209)

Coordinates: 32.0089°N 120.2631°E

- Part of the Red Cliffs campaign
Date	Winter of 208–209
Location	Jiangling County, Hubei, China
Result	Allied partial victory Cao Cao manages to defend Xiangyang; Allies gain majority of Jing province

Belligerents
Sun Quan; Liu Bei	Cao Cao

Commanders and leaders
Zhou Yu; Cheng Pu; Han Dang; Lü Meng; Ling Tong; Zhou Tai; Gan Ning; Liu Bei; Guan Yu; Zhang Fei; Lei Xu	Cao Ren; Xu Huang; Niu Jin; Chen Jiao; Yue Jin; Li Tong; Wen Ping

Strength
40,000+ (Note: This number is a rough estimate assuming the allied forces suffered minimal casualties during the Battle of Red Cliffs.)	120,000+ (the troops Cao Ren had prior to the battle was more than that of Zhou Yu, and he received reinforcements from Yi Province, Xiangyang, Runan, Jiangxia, Dangyang, and numerous other cities controlled by Cao Cao.)

Battle of Jiangling
- Traditional Chinese: 江陵之戰
- Simplified Chinese: 江陵之战
Transcriptions
Standard Mandarin
- Hanyu Pinyin: Jiānglǐng Zhī Zhàn

The Battle of Jiangling was fought by the allied forces of Sun Quan and Liu Bei against Cao Cao during the late Eastern Han dynasty of China. The battle was an integral part of the Red Cliffs campaign, and was fought immediately after the Battle of Yiling in 208, and the preceding engagement at Wulin (烏林; in present-day Honghu, Hubei) on land and the marine Battle of Red Cliffs where Cao Cao's navy was destroyed. Note that the battle at Wulin was a byproduct of the Battle of Red Cliffs, and they were not the same battle.

While the fighting around Jiangling County was vigorous, there were less fierce battles taking place in southern Jing Province. Unable to isolate Jiangling from its supporting cities (except those in Yi Province, see Battle of Yiling (208) for details), the campaign became a war of attrition, which resulted in enormous casualties for Cao Cao's side. After a year or so, Cao Cao could no longer afford the continuous losses in personnel and materiel, so he ordered Cao Ren to withdraw from Jiangling.

== Background ==
After the great victory in the Battle of Red Cliffs, the allies immediately carried out their next step of their strategy by attempting to take control of Nan Commandery (南郡) from Cao Cao by driving the retreating enemy toward Jiangling County.

== Battles ==
=== Liu Bei fronts ===
Zhou Yu was worried about Cao Cao's unscathed units totaling over 100,000 strong, which were scattered around strategic locations, so he urged Liu Bei to send Guan Yu to block Cao Ren's supply lines via infiltration. Zhou Yu wanted to have Guan Yu attack the enemy rear while bypassing the strongpoint of Jiangling, in order to isolate Jiangling for a coordinated attack.

==== Guan Yu's northern blockade ====
While Zhou Yu and Liu Bei were besieging Jiangling on the frontlines, Liu Bei authorized Zhang Fei and Guan Yu to command his troops. He suggested to Zhou Yu to block Jiangling from receiving new supplies as a means of driving Cao Ren out. Thus Guan Yu was sent to intercept enemy reinforcements in the north, setting up blockades along the main passages, cutting off all northern routes leading to Jiangling. Guan Yu, along with Su Fei (苏非), led a special force composed of navy and elite infantry, sailed up the Han River, infiltrating Cao Ren's territory. Cao Cao's general Li Tong engaged with Guan Yu's blockade to aid Cao Ren, dismounting and removing the blockades one by one to advance forward, fighting valiantly. However, Li Tong died during the campaign from illness. Xu Huang and Man Chong, who was stationed at Dangyang, also engaged with Guan Yu in Hanjin(漢津) to aid against Zhou Yu's advances in Jiangling, but only Xu Huang is recorded to have broke through the blockade to support Cao Ren.

Guan Yu's fleet was finally defeated by Yue Jin and Wen Ping at Xiakou and Guan Yu was held off by his rivals. However, none of Cao Cao's forces were able to fully aid Cao Ren and turn the tide decisively to their favor.

=== Zhou Yu fronts ===
The allies appeared to be suffering losses but their failures were considered minor as compared to that of Cao Cao's side. A few months earlier, Cao Ren's elite cavalry suffered over 3,000 casualties in a single day in an attempt to retake Yiling; besides, Cao Ren and his aide, Xu Huang, were unable to suppress Ling Tong, who were defending Zhou Yu's main camp on his own.

==== Niu Jin's assault ====
Hence, the soldiers inside Jiangling had low morale, and Cao Ren knew he needed to do something to change the tide of war. To prevent morale from dropping further, Cao Ren recruited 300 volunteers to form an assault force led by general Niu Jin, in the hope that they could score a minor victory or demonstrate bravery on the field to boost morale. When the enemy vanguard reached the outskirts of the city, the small detachment was immediately besieged. Cao Ren ordered several tens of his best men to be ready for the rescue. His Chief Clerk Chen Jiao advised against it, arguing that "the enemy's morale is too high, and losing several hundred men is not a big deal to us."

Cao Ren ignored Chen Jiao's plea and went out, charging directly into the enemy. As Chen Jiao lost sight of Cao Ren, he was certain that Cao Ren was dead. However, to everyone's surprise, not only did Cao Ren rescue Niu Jin on the first attempt, he went back to save the remaining survivors. As Cao Ren and his troops returned to safety behind the city walls, the total fatalities of the combined forces of Cao Ren and Niu Jin were minimal. The surprised Chen Jiao could only mutter one sentence: "General (Cao Ren), you are truly a man from Heaven." When Cao Cao learned of this soon after, he rewarded Cao Ren with the peerage of Marquis of Anping Village (安平亭侯) for his bravery in this battle. Encouraged by this incident, Cao Ren set up camps outside the city walls. Zhou Yu personally led raids on Cao Ren's camps, and during one such raid, he was seriously wounded after he was hit by an arrow that broke one of his right ribs.

==== Withdrawal of Cao Ren ====
The siege became prolonged. As Zhou Yu could not command the troops, the battles were left to Ling Tong, Lü Meng and others, who were forced to expediently alter their temporary objective into inflicting damage to the enemy units. After a year of intense fighting, Zhou Yu recovered and insisted on personally leading the army, he purposefully flaunted before Cao Ren and rallied his army to illustrate his determination to keep on the offensive. Being deceived by Zhou Yu, who was actually still in critical condition, Cao Cao unwillingly ordered Cao Ren to retreat under the rationale that his forces could no longer afford the continuous loss of material and labor. Therefore, Sun Quan's forces finally succeeded in their objective of capturing Nan Commandery, which holds the upper stream of the Yangtze River, a strategic stronghold that would never be reclaimed by the state of Cao Wei.

== Aftermath ==
Liu Bei asked for and obtained Zhou Yu's permission to cover the rear and the flank of Zhou Yu's navy by taking the remaining four commanderies to the south of the Yangtze River from Cao Cao. All of the administrators of Cao Cao's four commanderies, including Jin Xuan at Wuling Commandery, Han Xuan at Changsha Commandery, Zhao Fan at Guiyang Commandery, and Liu Du at Lingling Commandery surrendered. More importantly, Liu Bei's conquest of these commanderies was an integral portion of the Red Cliffs campaign as part of the goal of the allies. Liu Bei finally had a base of his own and he named Zhuge Liang as Military Adviser General of the Household (軍師中郎將) to oversee the administrative affairs of Changsha, Guiyang, and Lingling.

Liu Bei was joined by Lei Xu and his troops, which added to the Liu Bei's force substantially. As soon as the news of Cao Cao's defeat at Wulin was heard, Lei Xu at Lujiang (盧江; around present-day Chaohu City, Anhui) rebelled. Cao Cao's earlier strategy of keeping his veteran force in a separate force in the north to prepare for possible rebellions had paid off as he was able to summon the force to suppress the rebellion quickly by putting Xiahou Yuan in charge, but the victory was not complete: though defeated and lost his turf, Lei Xu's force was largely unscathed; he led them to Liu Bei, strengthening the latter. After Liu Bei became a powerful warlord of southern Jing Province, Sun Quan was a bit apprehensive of him, so he arranged a marriage for Liu Bei and his sister. With the help of Sun Quan's strategist, Lu Su, Liu Bei also successfully "borrowed" Nan Commandery from Sun. Meantime, Liu Bei placed Xiang Lang in charge of Zigui (秭歸), Yidao (夷道), Wushan (巫山), and Yiling (夷陵) counties, all of them vital to invade Yi Province (covering present-day Sichuan and Chongqing). Thus, Liu Bei had secured everything he needed for the invasion of Yi Province, and he would mobilise his troops towards Yi Province in 211.

Traditionally, the Battle of Jiangling is regarded as the end of the Red Cliffs campaign because as the confrontations ended and the battle turned into a siege, Cao Cao returned to his forward base in Qiao County in the north in March, 209, and Sun Quan also gave up his attack on Hefei in the east, and the remainder of the siege of Jiangling was no longer considered as part of the campaign by most historians. The fall of Jiangling to Sun Quan is generally regarded as the aftermath of the campaign.

== In Romance of the Three Kingdoms and popular culture ==
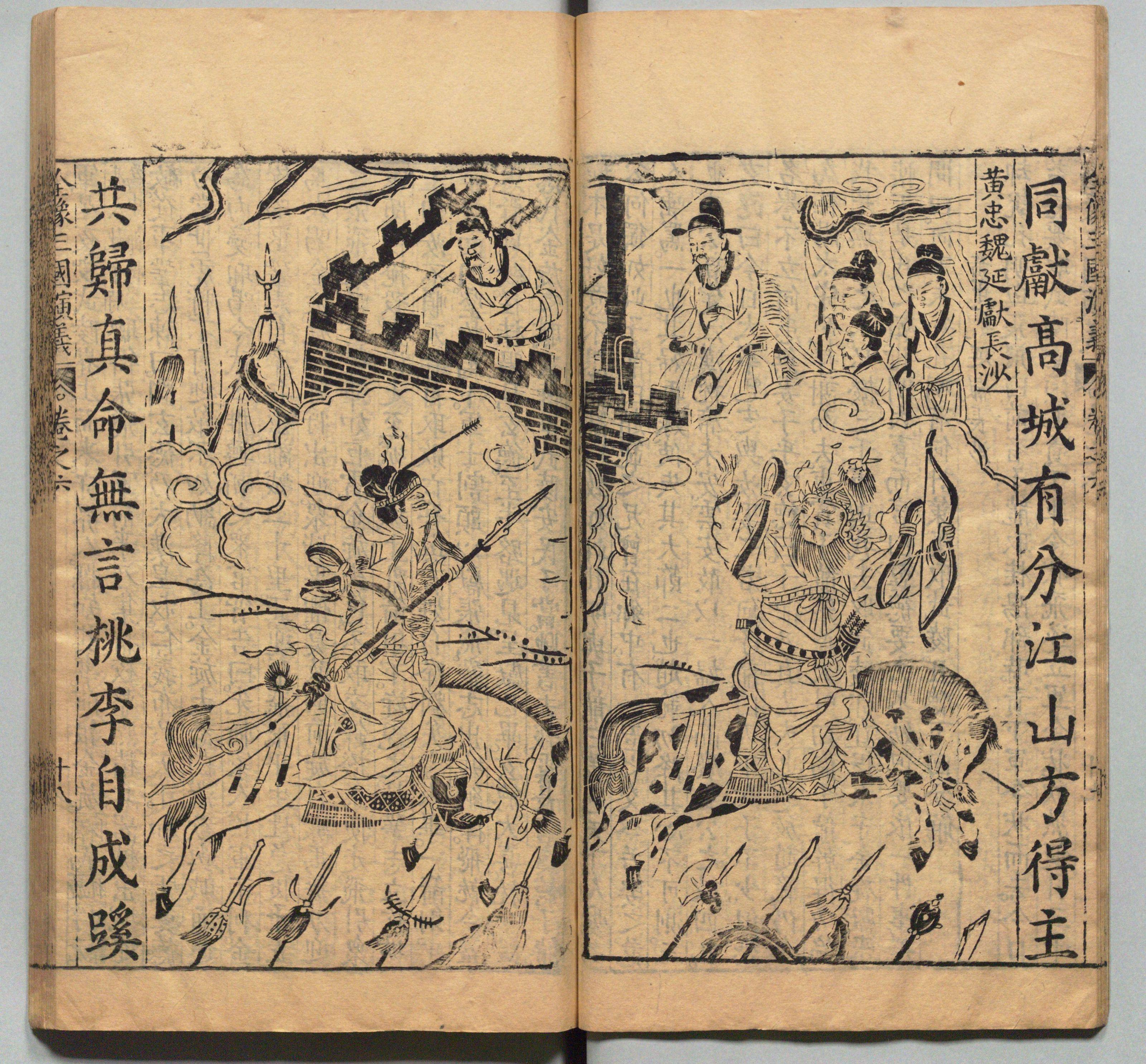
Woodblock print of Guan Yu battling with Huang Zhong.

For dramatic effect, in many literary works, Liu Bei's conquest of the four commanderies south of the Yangtze River includes a match between Guan Yu and Huang Zhong which became the source of other cultural works, such as Beijing opera. In reality; however, none of these were true.

Contrary to what was depicted in the 14th-century historical novel Romance of the Three Kingdoms, Han Xuan was not killed by Wei Yan, while there was no record when Wei Yan became a subject of Liu Bei or whether Wei Yan took part in this battle.

In Dynasty Warriors 4, this battle is called "Race for the Nan Territory".
