= Battle of Yiling (208) =

Battle between warlords Sun Quan and Cao Cao (208)

- Part of the Red Cliffs campaign
Date	Winter of 208 CE
Location	Yiling (Present-day Yichang, Hubei)
Result	Sun Quan victory

Belligerents
Sun Quan	Cao Cao

Commanders and leaders
Zhou Yu	Cao Ren

Strength
31,000 (this number assumes there were no casualties for Eastern Wu in the battle of Red Cliffs)	6,000 cavalry

Casualties and losses
Unknown	3,000+

Battle of Yiling
- Traditional Chinese: 夷陵之戰
- Simplified Chinese: 夷陵之战
Transcriptions
Standard Mandarin
- Hanyu Pinyin: Yílíng Zhī Zhàn

The Battle of Yiling was fought between the warlords Sun Quan and Cao Cao in 208 in the late Eastern Han dynasty. The battle was an integral part in the Red Cliffs campaign, as it was fought immediately after the major engagement at Wulin (烏林; in present-day Honghu, Hubei) during the Battle of Red Cliffs. The Battle of Yiling was also the prelude to the subsequent Battle of Jiangling.

== Background ==
Immediately after Cao Cao's defeat at Wulin in the Battle of Red Cliffs, Zhou Yu led 30,000 troops into Nan Commandery in a move to capture Jing Province's capital city, Jiangling (江陵; in present-day Jingjiang 荆江, not to be confused with present-day Jiangling County, Hubei). Zhou Yu's army camped on the southern bank of the Yangtze River. Before engaging Cao Cao's general Cao Ren, Zhou Yu ordered Gan Ning to take Yiling (夷陵; present-day Yichang, Hubei) as a preemptive move to secure the entrance to Yi Province (covering present-day Sichuan and Chongqing). In addition, if Yiling was captured, Cao Ren would be isolated from Yi Province's governor Liu Zhang, who was sending reinforcements to support him.

== Battle ==
=== Defection of Xi Su ===
The commander of Yiling, Xi Su (襲肅), was originally an official under Liu Zhang and he hated Cao Cao. When Gan Ning's troops reached Yiling, Xi Su surrendered without a fight. As Gan Ning's force reached 1,000 (Gan had 700 men initially), Zhou Yu wanted to merge Xi Su and his 300 troops into Lü Meng's unit to strengthen the main force. Lü Meng refused the offer and appealed to Sun Quan not to reassign Xi Su and his 300 men, but rather, keep Xi Su with Gan Ning to reinforce defenses at Yiling. Sun Quan agreed to Lü Meng's proposal. When Cao Ren learnt that Yiling had fallen, he immediately sent 6,000 cavalry to retake the city. Under intense pressure, Gan Ning remained calm and stabilized his army's morale.

=== Lü Meng's strategies ===
As Gan Ning's request for reinforcements reached Zhou Yu, nearly "everyone pointed out that there were not enough men to spare as a relief force". However, Lü Meng stood up and urged his colleagues to go and support Gan Ning, and guaranteed that Ling Tong could defend their main camp on his own for at least ten days. Zhou Yu followed Lü Meng's advice and left Ling Tong to defend his current position while leading Lü Meng and others to help Gan Ning.

Ling Tong took up the burden of facing Cao Ren and Xu Huang alone, in order to buy time for Zhou Yu, Lü Meng, and others to help Gan Ning at Yiling. Cao Ren did not expect Zhou Yu to ignore his massive army at Jiangling, and was consequently defeated at Yiling, suffering more than 3,000 casualties. Meanwhile, Ling Tong deceived Cao Ren into believing there was still a sizable army left in Zhou Yu's main camp, so Cao did not launch an all-out assault on Ling. Instead, Cao Ren sent Xu Huang to attack Ling Tong but failed. En route back to the main camp, Lü Meng suggested a plan to capture enemy warhorses: he would lead 300 soldiers to block the enemy's retreat route with bundles of firewood so the horses were unable to pass through. As Lü Meng expected, in order to escape from Zhou Yu's pursuit, Cao Ren's cavalry abandoned their steeds and fled back to Jiangling on foot. Zhou Yu returned with over 300 captured enemy warhorses and Yiling remained firmly in Sun Quan's control for the rest of the war.

== Aftermath ==
The fall of Yiling meant that Sun Quan's forces had opened up the entrance to Yi Province. It also implied that Cao Ren, who was in Jiangling, would no longer receive any reinforcements from Liu Zhang.

== Order of battle ==
=== Cao Cao forces ===
- General Who Attacks the South (征南將軍) Cao Ren, stationed in Jiangling (江陵; located in present-day Jingjiang 荊江, not to be confused with present-day Jiangling County, Hubei)
- General Who Sweeps Across the Wilderness" (橫野將軍) Xu Huang, stationed in Jiangling
  - General Xi Su (襲肅), from Yi Province, stationed at Yiling (夷陵, present-day Yichang, Hubei), later defected to Sun Quan

=== Sun Quan forces ===
- General in the Center Protecting the Army (中護軍將軍) Zhou Yu
  - Colonel Who Praises the Army (贊軍校尉) Lu Su, served as Zhou Yu's deputy
  - Right Area Commander (右都督) Cheng Pu
  - Commandant of Danyang (丹陽都尉) Huang Gai, served as vanguard of the navy
  - General of the Household Who Swipes Across the Wilderness (橫野中郎將) Lü Meng
  - Prefect of Dangkou (當口令) Gan Ning
  - General of the Household (中郎將) Han Dang
  - Chief of Yichun (宜春長) Zhou Tai
  - Commandant Who Inherits Fierceness (承烈都尉) Ling Tong
