= Wang Shuang (Cao Wei) =

Cao Wei state general (died 228/229)

Wang Shuang 王雙
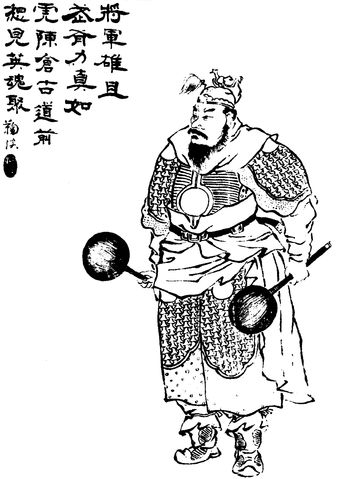
- A Qing dynasty illustration of Wang Shuang
- Born: Unknown
- Died: 228–229
- Other names: Ziquan (子全; courtesy name in Romance of the Three Kingdoms)
- Occupation: Military officer

Wang Shuang (died late 228), courtesy name Ziquan, was a military officer of the state of Cao Wei during the Three Kingdoms period of China. He initially participated in battles against Wei's rival state Eastern Wu but was defeated and captured. Later, he rejoined Wei and was reassigned to the western front to fight against Wei's other rival state, Shu Han. He was killed in battle against Shu forces.

== Life ==
Wang Shuang initially served as a lower ranking officer under Chang Diao (常雕), a subordinate of the Wei general Cao Ren. When Cao Ren led an expedition force several tens of thousands strong, composed of infantry, cavalry and marines to attack the Wu general Zhu Huan in 222, Chang Diao was tasked with launching a sneak attack on the island Zhongzhou, where the family members of the Wu soldiers lived. Wang Shuang followed Chang Diao into battle and they landed on Zhongzhou unopposed. At the time, Zhu Huan was busy fighting the main Wei army, so he left his subordinates to deal with Wang Shuang and Chang Diao after instructing them to set an ambush for the enemy. As planned, Wang Shuang and Chang Diao fell into the ambush. When they ran back to the shore, they only found out their ships had already been taken and their retreat route sealed. Chang Diao fought to the death, while Wang Shuang was captured by the Wu forces. About 1,000 Wei soldiers died in this single battle while the rest of the detachment surrendered.

Wang Shuang was later released and sent back to Wei. Like Niu Jin, another former subordinate of Cao Ren, he was reassigned to the western front to fight against Wei's other rival state, Shu Han. On the western front, Wang Shuang served as a subordinate the Wei general Cao Zhen, who was in charge of resisting invasions led by Shu's regent Zhuge Liang. During the Siege of Chencang, the Wei officer Hao Zhao and his 1,000 troops successfully held their position at Chencang against the Shu invaders until Wei reinforcements showed up. As Zhuge Liang and the Shu army retreated, Wang Shuang thought that it was a good opportunity to drive back the enemy so he led his troops in pursuit but fell into an ambush and was killed.

== In Romance of the Three Kingdoms ==
Wang Shuang appears as a minor character in the 14th-century historical novel Romance of the Three Kingdoms, which romanticises the events before and during the Three Kingdoms period. In the novel, he is famous for his skill in using the meteor hammer. During the Siege of Chencang, he leads the vanguard force of the Wei army led by Cao Zhen and engages the Shu forces in battle. He severely injures the Shu general Zhang Ni, but fails to finish him off because the Shu generals Liao Hua and Wang Ping show up and save Zhang Ni. Wang Shuang eventually meets his end at the hands of the Shu general Wei Yan in a fire attack near Hanzhong.

== See also ==
- Lists of people of the Three Kingdoms
