= Longcheng =

Longcheng may refer to:

== China ==
- Longcheng District, a district of Chaoyang, Liaoning
- Longcheng Square station, a station of Line 3 of the Shenzhen Metro
- Longcheng, a former name of Taiyuan, the capital of Shanxi province
- Longcheng, Tianshui (陇城镇), a town of Qin'an County, Tianshui, Gansu

== Laos ==
- Long Tieng, a military base, also known as Long Cheng

== Mongolia ==
- Longcheng, Mongolia, ancient capital of the Xiongnu Empire, also known as Dragon City
