= Wang Shuang =

Wang Shuang may refer to:

- Wang Shuang (Cao Wei) (?–228), Chinese general of the state of Cao Wei during the Three Kingdoms period
- Wang Shuang (footballer) (born 1995), Chinese football player
