= Thirty-Six Stratagems =

6th-century Chinese essay on military strategy

- Author: Unknown
- Language: Chinese
- Subject: military strategy
- Publication date: 6th century
- Publication place: China

Thirty-Six Stratagems

Chinese name
- Traditional Chinese: 三十六計
- Simplified Chinese: 三十六计
Transcriptions
Standard Mandarin
- Hanyu Pinyin: Sānshíliù Jì
- Bopomofo: ㄙㄢ ㄕˊ ㄌㄧㄡˋ ㄐㄧˋ
- Tongyong Pinyin: San shíh lioù Jì
Yue: Cantonese
- Jyutping: saam^{1} sap^{6} luk^{6} gai^{3}

Vietnamese name
- Vietnamese alphabet: tam thập lục kế ba mươi sáu kế
- Chữ Hán: 三十六計
- Chữ Nôm: 𠀧𨒒𦒹計

Korean name
- Hangul: 삼십육계
- Hanja: 三十六計

Japanese name
- Kanji: 兵法三十六計
- Hiragana: へいほうさんじゅうろっけい

The Thirty-Six Stratagems is a Chinese essay used to illustrate a series of stratagems used in politics, war, and civil interaction.

Its focus on the use of cunning and deception both on the battlefield and in court have drawn comparisons to Sun Tzu's The Art of War.

== Origin ==
The name of the collection comes from the Book of Qi's seventh biographical volume, Biography of Wang Jingze (王敬則傳). Wáng was a general who had served Southern Qi since the first Emperor Gao of the dynasty. When Emperor Ming came to power and executed many members of the court and royal family for fear that they would threaten his reign, Wang believed that he would be targeted next and rebelled. As Wang received news that Xiao Baojuan, son and crown prince of Emperor Ming, had escaped in haste after learning of the rebellion, he commented that "of the thirty-six stratagems of Lord Tán, retreat was his best, you father and son should run for sure." "Lord Tán" refers to general Tan Daoji of the Liu Song dynasty, who was forced to retreat after his failed attack on Northern Wei, and Wang mentioned his name in contempt as an example of cowardice.

The number thirty-six was used by Wang as a figure of speech in this context, and is meant to denote "numerous stratagems" instead of any specific number. Wang's choice of this term came from the I Ching, where six is the number of yin that shared many characteristics with the dark schemes involved in military strategy. As thirty-six is the square of six, it therefore acted as a metaphor for "numerous strategies". Since Wang did not refer to any thirty-six specific stratagems, the thirty-six proverbs and their connection to military strategies and tactics are likely to have been created after the fact, with only the collection's name being attributed to Wang.

The prevailing view is that contents of the Thirty-Six Stratagems originated in both written and oral history. Some stratagems reference occurrences in the time of Sun Bin, approximately 150 years after Sun Tzu's death. The original hand-copied paperback was believed to have been discovered in China's Shaanxi province, of an unknown date and author, and put into print by a local publisher in 1941. The Thirty-Six Stratagems came to the public's attention after a review of it was published in the Chinese Communist Party's Guangming Daily newspaper on September 16, 1961. It was subsequently reprinted and distributed with growing popularity.

The Thirty-Six Stratagems are divided into a preface, six chapters containing six stratagems each, and an incomplete afterword that was missing text. The first three chapters generally describe tactics for use in advantageous situations, while the last three chapters contain stratagems that are more suitable for disadvantageous situations. The original text of the Thirty-Six Stratagems has a laconic style that is common to Classical Chinese. Each proverb is accompanied by a short comment, no longer than a sentence or two, that explains how said proverb is applicable to military tactics. These 36 Chinese proverbs are related to 36 battle scenarios in Chinese history and folklore, predominantly of the Warring States period and the Three Kingdoms period.

== Content ==
The Thirty-Six Stratagems consists of six chapters, with each chapter consisting of six stratagems.

- Chapter 1: "Winning Stratagems" (勝戰計; Shèng zhàn jì)
  - Deceive the heavens to cross the sea (瞞天過海; Mán tiān guò hǎi): Mask one's real goals from those in authority who lack vision by not alerting them to one's movements or any part of one's plan.
  - Besiege Wèi to rescue Zhào (圍魏救趙; Wéi Wèi jiù Zhào): When the enemy is too strong to be attacked directly, attack something they cherish. The idea is to avoid a head-on battle with a strong enemy, and instead strike at their weakness elsewhere. This will force the strong enemy to retreat in order to support their weakness. Battling against a tired and dispirited enemy will give a much higher chance of success.
  - Kill with a borrowed knife (借刀殺人; Jiè dāo shā rén): Attack using the strength of another when in a situation where using one's own strength is not favourable. For example, trick an ally into attacking the enemy, or use the enemy's own strength against them. The idea is to cause damage to the enemy via a third party.
  - Wait at leisure while the enemy labors (以逸待勞; Yǐ yì dài láo): It is advantageous to choose the time and place for battle while the enemy does not. Encourage the enemy to expend their energy in futile quests while one conserves their strength. When the enemy is exhausted and confused, attack with energy and purpose.
  - Loot a burning house (趁火打劫; Chèn huǒ dǎ jié): When a country is beset by internal problems, such as disease, famine, corruption, and crime, it is poorly-equipped to deal with an outside threat. Keep gathering internal information about an enemy. If the enemy is in its weakest state, attack them without mercy and annihilate them to prevent future troubles.
  - Make a sound in the east, then strike in the west (聲東擊西; Shēng dōng jī xī): In any battle the element of surprise can provide an overwhelming advantage. Even when face-to-face with an enemy, surprise can still be employed by attacking where they least expect it. Create an expectation in the enemy's mind through the use of a feint. Manipulate the enemy to focus their resources somewhere before attacking elsewhere that is poorly defended. Tactically, this is known as an "open feint".
- Chapter 2: "Enemy Dealing Stratagems" (敵戰計; Dí zhàn j)
  - Create something from nothing (无中生有; Wú zhōng shēng yǒu): A plain lie. Make somebody believe there was something when there is in fact nothing or vice versa.
  - Openly repair the gallery roads, but sneak through the passage of Chencang (明修棧道，暗渡陳倉; Míng xiū zhàn dào, àn dù Chéncāng): Deceive the enemy with an obvious approach that will take a very long time, while ambushing them with another approach. It is an extension of the "Make a sound in the east, then strike in the west" tactic, but instead of merely spreading misinformation to draw the enemy's attention, physical decoys are used to further misdirect the enemy. The decoys must be easily seen by the enemy to draw their attention while acting as if they are meant to do what they are falsely doing to avoid suspicion. Today, "sneaking through the passage of Chencang" also has the meaning of having an affair or doing something that is illegal.
  - Watch the fires burning across the river (隔岸觀火; Gé àn guān huǒ): Delay entering the field of battle until all other parties become exhausted by fighting amongst each other. Go in at full strength and finish them off.
  - Hide a knife behind a smile (笑裏藏刀; Xiào lǐ cáng dāo): Charm and ingratiate oneself with the enemy. When their trust is gained, move against them in secret.
  - Sacrifice the plum tree to preserve the peach tree (李代桃僵; Lǐ dài táo jiāng): There are circumstances where short-term objectives must be sacrificed in order to gain the long-term goal. This is the scapegoat strategy where someone suffers the consequences so that the rest do not.
  - Take the opportunity to pilfer a goat (順手牽羊; Shùn shǒu qiān yáng): While carrying out one's plans, be flexible enough to take advantage of any opportunity that presents itself, however small, and avail oneself of any profit, however slight.
- Chapter 3: "Offensive Stratagems" (攻戰計; Gōng zhàn jì)
  - Stomp the grass to scare the snake (打草驚蛇; Dǎ cǎo jīng shé): Do something unaimed, but spectacular ("hitting the grass") to provoke a response from the enemy ("startle the snake") to have them give away their plans or position. Do something unusual, strange, and unexpected to arouse the enemy's suspicion and disrupt their thinking. It is more widely used as a warning: "[Do not] startle the snake by hitting the grass". An imprudent act will give one's position or intentions away to the enemy.
  - Borrow a corpse to resurrect the soul (借屍還魂; Jiè shī huán hún): Take an institution, a technology, a method, or even an ideology that has been forgotten or discarded and appropriate it for one's own purposes.
  - Lure the tiger down the mountain (調虎離山; Diào hǔ lí shān): Never directly attack an opponent whose advantage is derived from their position. Instead, lure them away from their position to separate them from their source of strength.
  - In order to capture, one must let loose (欲擒故縱; Yù qín gù zòng): Cornered prey will often mount a final desperate attack. To prevent this, let the enemy believe they still have a chance for freedom. Their will to fight is hampered by their desire to escape. The enemy's morale will be depleted and they will surrender without a fight when the illusion of escape is revealed.
  - Tossing out a brick to lure a jade gem (拋磚引玉; Pāo zhuān yǐn yù ): Bait someone by making them believe they gain something or to just make them react to it; "toss out a brick" to obtain something valuable from them in return ("get a jade gem").
  - Defeat the enemy by capturing their chief (擒賊擒王; Qín zéi qín wáng): If the enemy's army is strong but is allied to the commander only by money, superstition, or threats, target the leader. If the commander falls, the rest of the army will disperse or join one's side. If they are allied to the leader through loyalty, beware, as the army can continue to fight on after their death out of vengeance.
- Chapter 4: "Mixed Warfare Stratagems" (混戰計; Hùnzhàn jì)
  - Remove the firewood from under the pot (釜底抽薪; Fú dǐ chōu xīn): Take out the leading argument or asset of someone; "steal someone's thunder". This is the essence of the indirect approach: instead of attacking enemy's fighting forces, direct attacks against their ability to wage war. Literally, take the fuel out of the fire.
  - Disturb the water and catch a fish (混水摸魚; 渾水摸魚; Hùn shuǐ mō yú): Create confusion and exploit it to further one's own goals.
  - Slough off the cicada's golden shell (金蟬脱殼; Jīn chán tuō ké/qiào): Mask oneself. Either leave one's distinctive traits behind and become inconspicuous or masquerade as something or someone else. This strategy is mainly used to escape from a stronger enemy.
  - Shut the door to catch the thief (關門捉賊; Guān mén zhuō zéi): To capture one's enemy, or more generally in fighting wars, to deliver the final blow to the enemy, plan prudently for success; do not rush into action. Before "moving in for the kill", first cut off the enemy's escape routes and any routes from external aid.
  - Befriend a distant state and strike a neighbouring one (遠交近攻; Yuǎn jiāo jìn gōng): Invading nations close to oneself carries a higher chance of success. The battlefields are close to one's domain and as such is easier for one's troops to receive supplies and defend the conquered land. Make allies with nations far away from oneself, as it is unwise to invade them.
  - Obtain safe passage to conquer the State of Guo (假途伐虢; Jiǎ tú fá Guó): Borrow the resources of an ally to attack a common enemy. Once the enemy is defeated, use those resources to turn on the ally that lent them in the first place.
- Chapter 5: "Combined Stratagems" (並戰計; Bìng zhàn jì)
  - Replace the beams with rotten timbers (偷梁換柱; Tōu liáng huàn zhù): Disrupt the enemy's formations, interfere with their methods of operations, and change the rules that they are used to following. In this way the supporting pillar, the common link that makes a group of men an effective fighting force, is removed.
  - Point at the mulberry tree while cursing the locust tree (指桑罵槐; Zhǐ sāng mà huái): To discipline, control, or warn others whose status or position excludes them from direct confrontation; use analogy and innuendo. Without directly naming names, those accused cannot retaliate without revealing their complicity.
  - Feign madness but keep your balance (假痴不癲; Jiǎ chī bù diān): Pretend to be incompetent to create confusion about one's intentions and motivations. Lure the opponent into underestimating one's ability until they drop their guard.
  - Remove the ladder when the enemy has ascended to the roof (上屋抽梯; Shàng wū chōu tī): With baits and deceptions, lure the enemy into treacherous terrain and cut off their lines of communication and escape routes. To save themselves, they must fight both one's own forces and the elements of nature.
  - Decorate the tree with false blossoms (樹上開花; Shù shàng kāi huā): Tying silk blossoms on a dead tree gives the illusion that the tree is healthy. Using artifice and disguise, make something worthless appear valuable and vice versa.
  - Make the host and the guest exchange roles (反客為主; Fǎn kè wéi zhǔ): Usurp leadership in a situation where one is normally subordinate. Infiltrate one's target. Initially, pretend to be a guest to be accepted, but develop from inside and become the owner later.
- Chapter 6: "Defeat Stratagems" (敗戰計; Bài zhàn jì)
  - The beauty trap (Honeypot) (美人計; Měi rén jì): Send the enemy beautiful women to cause discord within his camp. This strategy can work on three levels. First, the ruler becomes so enamoured with the beauty that he neglects his duties and allows his vigilance to wane. Second, the group of men will begin to have issues if the desired women court another man, thus creating conflict and aggressive behavior. Third, other females at court, motivated by jealousy and envy, begin to plot subversions that further exacerbate the situation.
  - The empty fort strategy (空城計; Kōng chéng jì): When the enemy has stronger forces and one expects to be overrun at any moment, act calmly and taunt the enemy, so that the enemy thinks they are walking into an ambush. This stratagem is only successful in most cases if one has a powerful hidden force and the stratagem is seldom used.
  - Let the enemy's own spy sow discord in the enemy camp (反間計; Fǎn jiàn jì): Undermine the enemy's ability to fight by secretly causing discord between them and their friends, allies, advisors, family, commanders, soldiers, and population. While they are preoccupied with settling internal disputes, their ability to attack or defend is compromised.
  - Inflict injury on oneself to win the enemy's trust (苦肉計; Kǔ ròu jì): Pretending to be injured has two advantages: first, the enemy is lulled into lowering their guard since they no longer consider one to be an immediate threat. Second, ingratiating oneself with the enemy by pretending the injury was caused by a mutual enemy conserves one's strength while one's enemies fight each other.
  - Chain stratagems (連環計; Lián huán jì): In important matters, one should use several stratagems applied simultaneously after another as in a chain of stratagems. Keep different plans operating in an overall scheme; if any one strategy fails, apply the next strategy.
  - If all else fails, retreat (走為上策; Zǒu wéi shàng cè): If it becomes obvious that one's current course of action will lead to defeat, retreat and regroup. When one's side is losing, three choices remain: surrender, compromise, or escape. Surrender is complete defeat, compromise is half defeat, but escape is not defeat. As long as one is not defeated, there is still a chance. This is the most famous of the stratagems and is immortalized in the form of a Chinese idiom: "Of the Thirty-Six Stratagems, fleeing is best" (三十六計，走為上計; Sānshíliù jì, zǒu wéi shàng jì).

== See also ==
- The Art of War
- The Book of Five Rings
- On War
- Psychological warfare

== Sources ==
- The 36 Secret Strategies of the Martial Arts: The Classic Chinese Guide for Success in War, Business and Life by Hiroshi Moriya, William Scott Wilson
- The Book of Stratagems by Harro von Senger. ISBN 0140169547
- The 36 Stratagems for Business: Achieve Your Objectives Through Hidden and Unconventional Strategies and Tactics by Harro von Senger. ISBN 9781904879466
- Greatness in Simplicity: The 36 Stratagems and Chinese Enterprises, Strategic Thinking by Cungen GE. ISBN 7802076420
