= Hao Zhao =

3rd century state of Cao Wei general

- 郝昭

General of a Miscellaneous Title (雜號將軍)
- In office ?–?
- Monarch: Cao Pi / Cao Rui

Personal details
- Born: Unknown; Taiyuan, Shanxi
- Died: 229?
- Children: Hao Kai
- Occupation: General
- Courtesy name: Bodao (伯道)

Hao Zhao (fl. 220–229), courtesy name Bodao, was a military general of the state of Cao Wei during the Three Kingdoms period of China. He is best known for his victory at the siege of Chencang in 229 when he led a successful defence of Chencang against an invasion by a much larger army from Wei's rival state Shu Han. However, he died of illness not long after that.

== Career before Chencang ==
Hao Zhao was from Taiyuan Commandery (太原郡), which is around present-day Taiyuan, Shanxi. He was described as "masculine and strong". He joined the army at a young age and was promoted to a General of a Miscellaneous Title (雜號將軍) (Note: In the Eastern Han dynasty and Three Kingdoms period, there were two categories of general ranks: Generals of Important Titles (重號將軍) and Generals of Miscellaneous Titles (雜號將軍). The former category includes generals with specific appointments such as General-in-Chief (大將軍), General of Agile Cavalry (驃騎將軍), General Who Guards the East (鎮東將軍) and General of the Vanguard (前將軍). The latter category includes generals with no specific appointments such as Lieutenant-General (偏將軍), Major-General (裨將軍), General Who Defeats Barbarians (破虜將軍) and General Who Attacks Rebels (討逆將軍). Hao Zhao's rank belonged to the latter category.) after making achievements in battle.

In 220, Qu Yan (麴演), Zhang Jin (張進) and Huang Hua (黃華) started a rebellion in Xiping (西平), Zhangye (張掖) and Jiuquan (酒泉) commanderies, all in present-day Gansu and Qinghai. The local tribes in Wuwei Commandery (武威郡) also rose up and joined the rebels. Hao Zhao and Wei Ping (魏平) joined the Wei general Su Ze (蘇則) in leading government forces to suppress the rebellion and succeeded in killing Qu Yan and Zhang Jin and forcing Huang Hua and the local tribes in Wuwei Commandery to surrender. Hao Zhao remained in charge of the lands west of the Yellow River, covering parts of present-day Shanxi, Shaanxi and Gansu. During his tenure of over 10 years, he maintained peace and security in the region.

In 227, Qu Ying (麴英) from Xiping Commandery started a rebellion and killed the officials in charge of Linqiang (臨羌) and Xidu (西都) counties. Hao Zhao and Lu Pan (鹿磐) led government forces to attack Qu Ying and succeeded in suppressing the revolt and killing Qu Ying.

== Defence of Chencang ==
Following the Tianshui revolts and the Battle of Jieting in early 228, Cao Zhen, the General-in-Chief of Wei, predicted that a future invasion by Wei's rival state Shu Han would come from Chencang (陳倉; east of present-day Baoji, Shaanxi), so he ordered Hao Zhao and Wang Sheng (王生) to guard Chencang and strengthen its defences. Cao Zhen was proven right as the Shu regent Zhuge Liang led troops to attack Chencang sometime in January 229.

Zhuge Liang already knew that Chencang was heavily fortified and difficult to capture, so when he showed up with the Shu army, he was surprised to see that it was so well-defended and was shocked when he heard that Hao Zhao was in charge of defending it. He had heard of Hao Zhao's reputation as a highly capable general and realised that he could not take Chencang easily. Zhuge Liang then ordered his troops to surround Chencang and then sent Jin Xiang (靳詳), who was from the same hometown as Hao Zhao, to persuade him to surrender. Hao Zhao replied, "You're familiar with the laws of Wei and you know me well as a person. I've received much grace from my State and my house is important. There's nothing you can say (to change my mind). Return to Zhuge (Liang) and tell him to prepare to attack." After Jin Xiang reported to him what Hao Zhao said, Zhuge Liang sent Jin Xiang to try to persuade Hao Zhao again and tell him that he stood no chance against the Shu army and that there was no need for him to seek death and destruction. Hao Zhao replied, "I stand by what I told you earlier. I may recognise you, but my arrow won't." Jin Xiang then left.

The odds were drastically against Hao Zhao – he had only about 1,000 men to resist the Shu army numbering tens of thousands, with no sign of Wei reinforcements heading towards Chencang. Zhuge Liang then ordered his troops to use an escalade tactic by scaling Chencang's walls with siege ladders. However, Hao Zhao countered by ordering archers to fire flaming arrows at the siege ladders, setting them aflame and burning the soldiers on them. When the enemy used battering rams, Hao Zhao ordered his troops to link rocks and boulders with chains and roll them down the walls to smash the battering rams. The Shu army then resorted to filling up the moat around Chencang for their siege towers to get close to the walls and allow soldiers to climb up. Hao Zhao countered this tactic by ordering his men to build an interior layer of walls behind the exterior walls to prevent the enemy from advancing further in. Zhuge Liang then thought of getting his troops to dig tunnels leading directly into Chencang, but Hao Zhao was prepared for this again as he ordered his men to dig tunnels in a perpendicular direction to block the enemy.

The siege lasted for over 20 days. Zhuge Liang was unable to do anything to overcome Hao Zhao and capture Chencang. After some 20 days, he decided to withdraw his troops when he learnt that Wei reinforcements were approaching.

== Death ==
The Wei imperial court issued a decree to praise Hao Zhao for his valiant defence of Chencang and confer him the title of a marquis to reward him for his achievements. When Hao Zhao came to the Wei imperial capital Luoyang later, the Wei emperor Cao Rui had a meeting with him. Cao Rui told Sun Zi (孫資), an official from the same hometown as Hao Zhao: "Your hometown has such bold and forthright men. What's there for me to worry about if I have generals as fiery as them?" He wanted to assign greater responsibilities to Hao Zhao, but Hao Zhao became critically ill and eventually died not long later.

Before his death, Hao Zhao told his son Hao Kai (郝凱): "As a general, I know what a general shouldn't do. I've dug up many graves to obtain wood for making battle equipment, so I know a grand funeral is of no use to the dead. (After I die,) you must dress me in plain clothing. In life, we have a place to live in; in death, where can we go? It's up to you to decide where my grave will be, be it in the north, south, east or west."

== In popular culture ==
Qin Fanxiang portrayed Hao Zhao in the 2010 Chinese television series Three Kingdoms.

== See also ==
- Lists of people of the Three Kingdoms
