= Siege of Chencang =

Battle between Shu Han and Cao Wei forces (228-229)

- Part of Zhuge Liang's Northern Expeditions
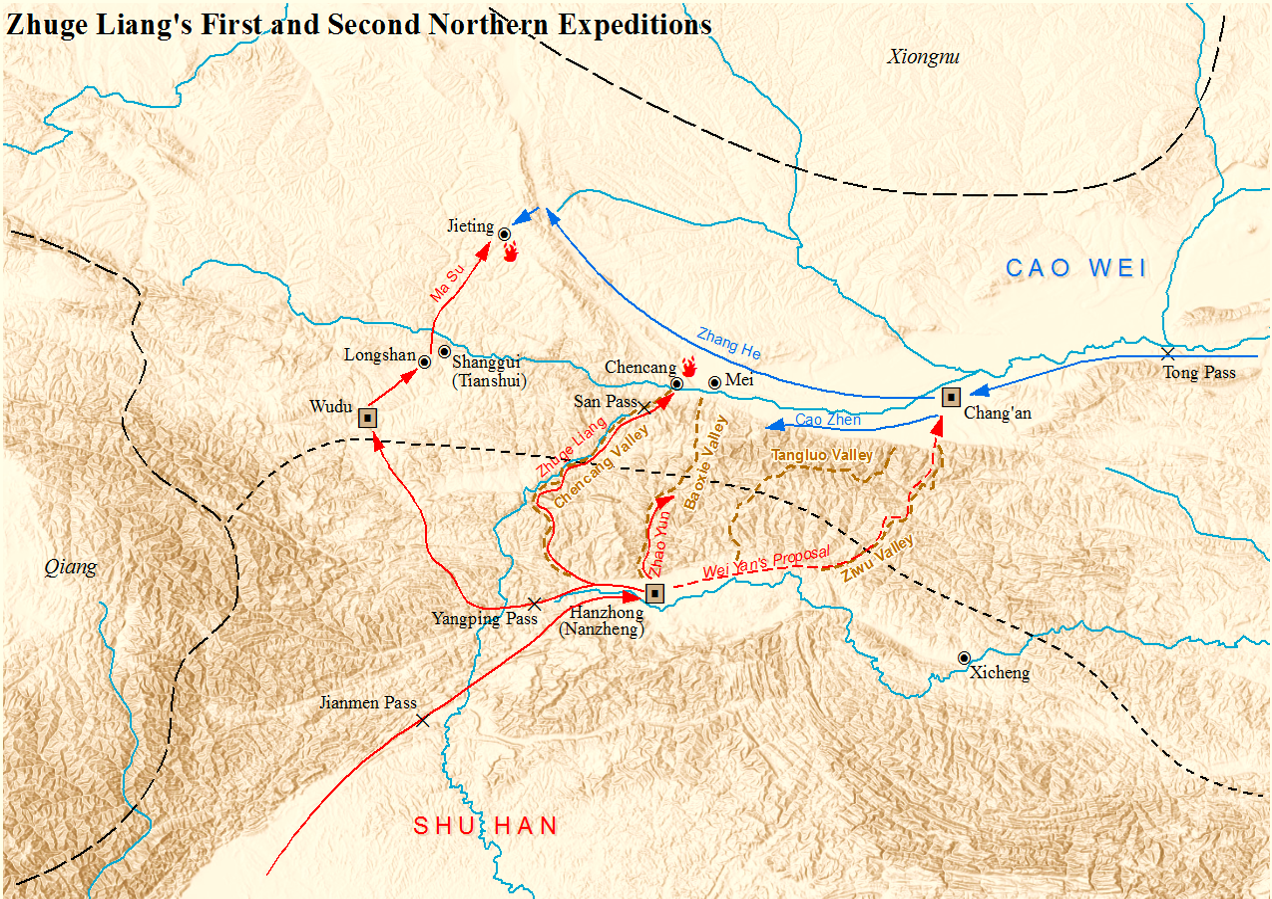
- Map showing the first and second Northern Expeditions
Date	January – February 229
Location	Chencang District, Baoji, Shaanxi, China
Result	Wei victory

Belligerents
Cao Wei	Shu Han

Commanders and leaders
Hao Zhao	Zhuge Liang

Strength
1,000	40,000–50,000

Casualties and losses
Unknown	Unknown

Siege of Chencang
- Traditional Chinese: 陳倉之圍
- Simplified Chinese: 陈仓之围
Transcriptions
Standard Mandarin
- Hanyu Pinyin: Chéncāng zhī wéi

The siege of Chencang was a battle fought between the states of Shu Han and Cao Wei between December 228 to early 229 during the Three Kingdoms period in China. It was the second of the Northern Expeditions led by Shu-Han's chancellor-regent, Zhuge Liang, to invade Wei. It was part of an attempt to divert Wei forces away from Jing Province following the Battle of Shiting between Wei and Shu's ally state, Eastern Wu. The siege came to an end when Shu forces retreated after failing to capture Chencang.

== Background ==
In 228, after Eastern Wu defeated Cao Wei at the Battle of Shiting, Wei reinforced the east by mobilizing its troops in the west. Shu Chancellor and regent, Zhuge Liang, hoped to use this opportunity to launch an incursion into Wei territory. Before the Chancellor finalized an operation plan, Cao Zhen of Wei had distinctly anticipated Zhuge's route of advancement and recommended Hao Zhao to build fortifications for Chencang. The Supreme General, Cao Zhen, assured the young emperor Cao Rui of the defence against probable invasions from Shu. However, Hao Zhao was only assigned 1,000 men for his task. The prognosis was made after Zhuge Liang had lost the first expedition earlier that year.

== Battle ==
=== Prelude ===
After his failure on Mount Qi and Jieting, Zhuge Liang indeed changed his target to Chencang as Cao Zhen reckoned. Thoroughly prepared, the Shu Chancellor brought with him a selection of siege weapons and an expedition force of one hundred thousand men. Although a few officers including Wei Yan recommended an alternate route, Zhuge Liang was determined to follow the Jialing Valley, which emerges in the north where the Wei River widens considerably near the city of Chencang. Zhuge Liang planned to capture Chencang as a midpoint for further military actions against the great metropolis Chang'an.

The Shu army reached the fortress-city of Chencang during December 228, wherein the Wei defences were apparently not completed as Cao Zhen had not sent additional forces to move in. Having completed the encirclement, Zhuge Liang sent Jin Xiang, a personal friend of Hao Zhao, to convince the latter to defect. The first time the two friends spoke, Hao Zhao would hear none of it, saying "The laws of Wei are what you practise; the nature of me is what you know. I have received so much from my country and I can't let down my family. You ought to say no more, I'll only die defending this city." Jin Xiang told Zhuge Liang what Hao Zhao had said, and again Zhuge Liang sent Jin Xiang to soften Hao Zhao. "Our armies are enormous while you only have a tiny force, what good is it to perish for a futile effort?" said Jin Xiang outside the city gate. This time, however, Hao Zhao fitted an arrow to his bow and replied, "What I said earlier remains solid. I know you, but my arrow doesn't", implicitly threatening to kill Jin Xiang. Upon hearing this, Zhuge Liang began his offensive.

=== Siege ===
Zhuge Liang aimed to take the fortress directly; he carried out an escalade tactic through the use of siege ladders, but Hao Zhao countered with fire arrows, burning the platforms and parching the men upon them. While the ladders were still aflame, Zhuge Liang's battering rams designed to breach the city gate had arrived, and Hao Zhao hurriedly chained some boulders and rolled them down, smashing the rams. The quick response and leadership of Hao Zhao shocked Zhuge Liang, as the latter never expected such a determined resistance.

Zhuge Liang then ordered a withdrawal and reconsidered his tactics. Since moats made access to the walls difficult for siege weapons, which needed to be brought up against a wall to be effective, Zhuge Liang decided to remove the trenches to create more possible attack points. Following Zhuge Liang's order, the besiegers started to fill the chasms and prepared their siege towers. With the ditches removed, the siege engines moved upon the castle while foot-soldiers climbed the walls like ants. However, Hao Zhao outwitted Zhuge Liang by building interior walls within the outer walls. As long as the siege towers could not pass the outer walls, the soldiers on top of the towers who managed to overcome the outer walls could not climb the second inner walls. Trapped inside the two gates of walls, those soldiers who descended from the towers became easy targets for archers on the inner walls.

Suffering another defeat, Zhuge Liang adopted an architectural approach by asking his soldiers to dig tunnels that led to the substructure of the fortress. However, his method was actually different from the more common mining tactic, which is to excavate beneath the foundations of the walls, and then deliberately collapsing or exploding the tunnel—it is recorded that Zhuge Liang wanted to create some underground passages for his armies to enter the city directly in order to catch his opponent off guard.

Eventually news came of Wei reinforcements led by Zhang He, so the Shu army retreated. Seeking glory, a Wei general, Wang Shuang, led his cavalry in pursuit of the enemy to the Qinling Mountains, where he fell into an ambush planted by Zhuge Liang and was killed. On the other hand, Zhang He precisely predicted Zhuge Liang would retreat before he even arrived at Chencang, so Zhang He headed for Nanzheng, but was not able to catch up with Zhuge Liang.

== Aftermath ==
Scoring such a victory, Hao Zhao instantly became a celebrity, and an imperial decree was passed down to grant him a marquis title. Cao Rui also summoned Hao Zhao to the Wei capital, Luoyang, where he highly praised the general for his valiant defence of Chencang. However, Hao Zhao soon died of illness during his stay in Luoyang.

In the same year of 229, Zhuge Liang launched the third Northern Expedition. This time, he again changed his target, sending Chen Shi to besiege Wudu and Yinping commanderies. The Wei defending general, Guo Huai, ceded the two commanderies to Shu forces, in fear he would be sandwiched by Chen Shi and Zhuge Liang.

== Bibliography ==
- Liang, Jieming (2006). Chinese Siege Warfare: Mechanical Artillery and Siege Weapons of Antiquity, an Illustrated History. Da Pao Publishing. ISBN 978-9810553807.
- Sawyer, Ralph (2010). Zhuge Liang: Strategy, Achievements, and Writings. CreateSpace Independent Publishing. ISBN 978-1492860020.
