= Teru teru bōzu =

Japanese doll

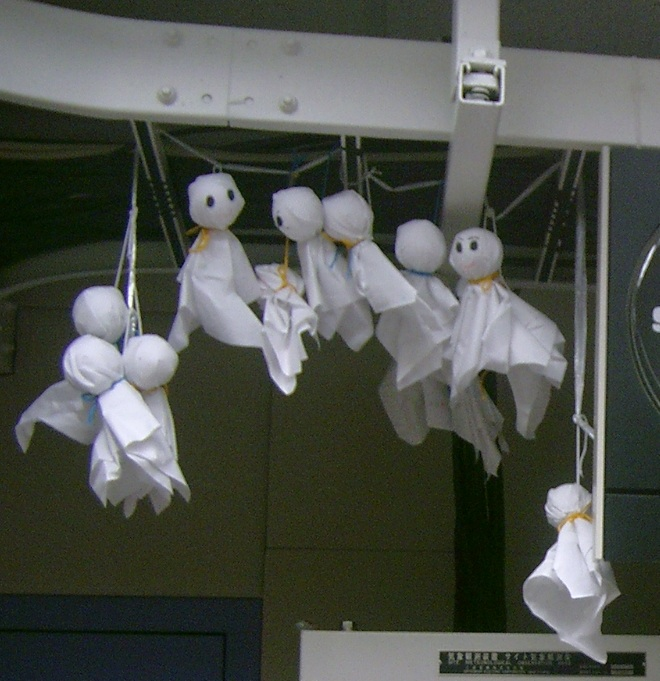
Teru teru bōzu dolls

A teru teru bōzu (Japanese: てるてる坊主 or 照る照る坊主; lit. 'shine, shine monk') is a small traditional handmade doll hung outside doors and windows in Japan in hope of sunny weather. Made from tissue paper or cloth, teru teru bōzu charms are usually white, ghost-like figures with strings tied around their necks.

The words teru (照る) meaning 'to shine' and bōzu (坊主) referring to a Buddhist monk, the doll is said to represent a monk's bald head, which would shine during sunny weather. The doll therefore calls to a monk's magical powers to stop or prevent rain. Traditionally, if the weather does turn out well, a libation of holy sake is poured over them, and they are washed away in the river.

In particular, teru teru bōzu charms are popular among Japanese children, who are introduced to the charms in kindergarten or daycare through a famous warabe uta (nursery rhyme) released in 1921. The song calls teru teru bōzu to bring back the sunny days, promising lots of sake if the wish is fulfilled, but decapitation if not. The nursery rhyme is usually sung by children as they make the doll.

Teru teru bōzu became popular during the Edo period among urban dwellers, whose children would make them the day before the good weather was desired and chant, "Fine-weather priest, please let the weather be good tomorrow."

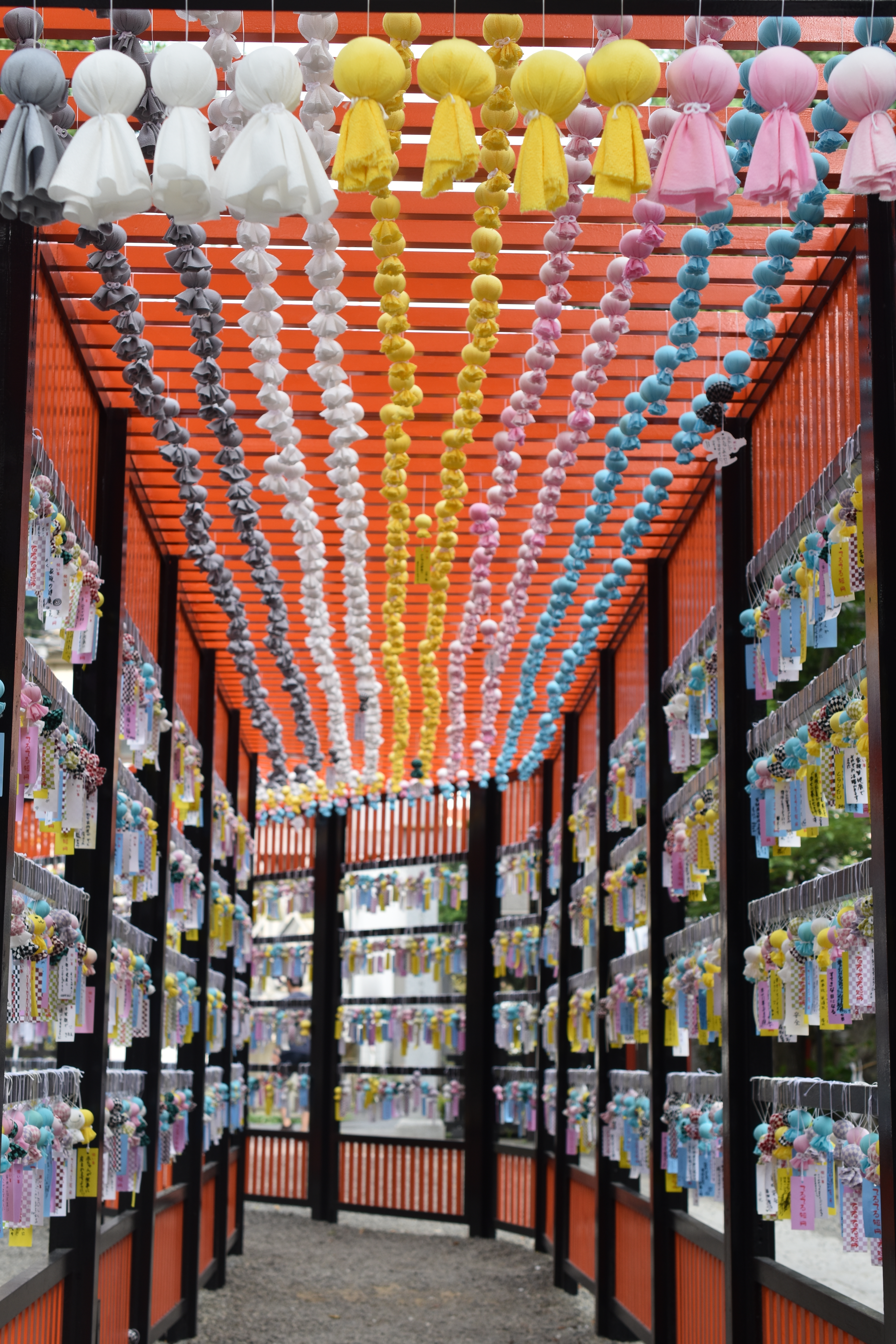
The Tanabata Teruteru Tunnel at Tanashi Shrine, Nishitokyo

== History ==
The tradition of weather-watchers and a rich folk culture of hiyorimi (日和見) can be traced with certainty to the Heian period (749–1185) continuing through the Edo period (1603–1867). Teru teru bōzu weather-watching practice tradition originated and was adapted from a Chinese practice during the Heian period. The practice, called Saoqing Niang (掃晴娘) in China, involved putting the teru teru bōzu on the end of a broom to sweep good spirits your way, and rather than bōzu being a monk, but a young girl with a broom. As the story unfolds, a girl was sacrificed to save the city during a heavy rainfall by ascending symbolically to the heavens and sweeping rain clouds from the sky. Since then, the people have commemorated her by making paper cutouts of her and hanging them outdoors in the hopes of good weather.

Teru teru bōzu as a Japanese practice seems to have originated from the similarity between origami dolls and names described in the literature in the middle of the Edo period. A reference to teru teru bōzu is written in Kiyū Shōran (嬉遊笑覧) by Nobuyo Kitamura, a scholar of Japanese classical literature in 1830. It is written, "If the weather becomes fine, I write my pupils on the paper, offer sake to the gods, and pour it into the river."

== See also ==
- Ikeda, Nagano – a town in Nagano Prefecture, Japan, whose mascot is designed in the motif of teru teru bōzu.
