= Li Tong (Wenda) =

Chinese general serving warlord Cao Cao (168-209)

- 李通

Administrator of Runan (汝南太守)
- In office ? – 209
- Monarch: Emperor Xian of Han
- Chancellor: Cao Cao (from 208)

Commandant of Yang'an (陽安都尉)
- In office ?–?
- Monarch: Emperor Xian of Han

Major-General (裨將軍)
- In office ? – 209
- Monarch: Emperor Xian of Han

Personal details
- Born: 168 (Note: Li Tong's biography in the Sanguozhi recorded that he died of illness around the time of the Battle of Jiangling in 209. He was 42 years old (by East Asian age reckoning) when he died. By calculation, his year of birth should be 168.) Xinyang, Henan
- Died: 209 (aged 41) Jiangling County, Hubei
- Children: Li Xu; Li Ji
- Occupation: General
- Courtesy name: Wenda (文達)
- Posthumous name: Marquis Gang (剛侯)
- Peerage: Marquis of a Chief Village (都亭侯)
- Childhood name: Wanyi (萬億)

Li Tong (168–209), courtesy name Wenda, was a military general serving under the warlord Cao Cao during the late Eastern Han dynasty of China. Li Tong came to serve Cao Cao when the latter was at war with rival warlords Liu Biao and Zhang Xiu. During the Battle of Nan Commandery in 208, Li Tong broke through the defence lines guarded by Guan Yu and supported Cao Ren at Jiangling. He fell sick during this time and eventually succumbed to illness. He had two sons: Li Xu (李緒) and Li Ji (李基).

== Descendants ==
Li Xu's son Li Bing (李秉; died c.271) (Note: Li Bing's name was changed to "Jing" in his son Li Zhong's (李重) biography in Book of Jin as it violated naming taboo by sounding similar to the name of Emperor Gaozu's father. Li Zhong's biography also recorded that his father died before he was ruoguan (弱冠; usually used to describe someone around the age of 19 (20 by East Asian reckoning)).), courtesy name Xuanzhou (玄胄), was Inspector of Qinzhou (Note: Per the annals of Emperor Wu in Book of Jin, Qin province was created in March or April 269 (2nd month of the 5th year of the Tai'shi era; the month corresponds to 20 Mar to 18 Apr 269 in the Julian calendar). The Zizhi Tongjian explicitly indicated that Hu Lie was Qin province's first Inspector. However, Hu died on 9 July 270, during Tufa Shujineng's rebellion. The Zizhi Tongjian went on to record that Du Yu was the next Inspector of Qin province, but was soon sent back to Luoyang in a prison cart for him to face the Minister of Justice. Thus, Li Bing was likely Du Yu's replacement as Inspector of Qin province.) under the Jin dynasty. Li Bing presumably died young as his son Li Zhong (李重; courtesy name Maozeng [茂曾]; c.253-c.300 (Note: Li Zhong's biography in Book of Jin recorded that he died at the age of 48 (by East Asian reckoning) during the early Yongkang era (300-301) of the reign of Emperor Hui of Jin.)) was said to be orphaned at a young age. Li Zhong's younger brother was Li Shang (李尚), courtesy name Maozhong (茂仲). Li Zhong's other younger Li Ju (李矩), courtesy name Maoyue (茂约), was Inspector of Jiangzhou during the Jin dynasty, while Li Ju's son Li Chong (李充; courtesy name Hongdu [弘度]) was a poet and calligrapher; Li Ju presumably also died young as Li Chong was said to be orphaned at a young age. Li Chong's mother and Li Ju's wife was Wei Shuo.

== In Romance of the Three Kingdoms ==
In the 14th-century historical novel Romance of the Three Kingdoms, Li Tong was defeated and slain by Ma Chao in a duel during the Battle of Tong Pass in 211.

== See also ==
- Lists of people of the Three Kingdoms
