= Battle of Jieting =

Battle between states of Cao Wei and Shu Han (228)

Coordinates: 35.0020074°N 105.9718660°E

- Part of the first of Zhuge Liang's Northern Expeditions
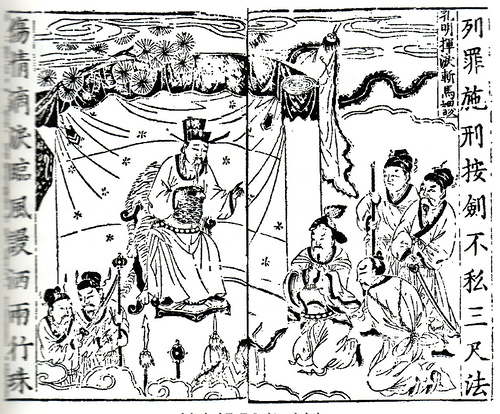
- A Qing dynasty illustration of Ma Su's execution
Date	c. February – May 228
Location	Longcheng Town, Qin'an County, Gansu, China
Result	Wei victory

Belligerents
Cao Wei	Shu Han

Commanders and leaders
Zhang He; Cao Zhen	Ma Su (executed); Wang Ping

Strength
Unknown	Unknown

Casualties and losses
Unknown	Unknown

Battle of Jieting
- Traditional Chinese: 街亭之戰
- Simplified Chinese: 街亭之战
Transcriptions
Standard Mandarin
- Hanyu Pinyin: Jiētíng Zhī Zhàn

The Battle of Jieting was fought between the states of Cao Wei and Shu Han in 228 during the Three Kingdoms period in China. The battle was part of the first Northern Expedition led by Shu's chancellor-regent, Zhuge Liang, to attack Wei. The battle concluded with a decisive victory for Wei.

== Opening moves ==
Zhuge Liang first sent generals Zhao Yun and Deng Zhi as a decoy diversionary force to Ji Valley (箕谷) and pretend to attack Mei County (郿縣; southeast of present-day Fufeng County, Shaanxi) via Xie Valley (斜谷) as a way to lure the main Wei forces of the region, while Zhuge Liang personally led a force towards Mount Qi. Cao Zhen led his army to oppose Zhao Yun while the three Wei-controlled commanderies – Nan'an (南安; around present-day Longxi County, Gansu), Tianshui and Anding (安定; around present-day Zhenyuan County, Gansu) – responded to the Shu invasion by defecting to the Shu side.

People of Wei saw Liu Bei as the main hero of Shu Han. Following his death, there were a few years of peace. Thus, the western lands were unprepared for such a dire situation. When they learned that there was a massive risk of losing the Guanzhong region. Cao Rui, the emperor of Wei, personally moved to Chang'an and assembled a secondary force under Zhang He to attack Zhuge Liang. Zhuge Liang chose generals Ma Su as the vanguard commander along with Wang Ping to intercept Zhang He, rather than the suggested veterans officers Wei Yan or Wu Yi.

== Battle ==
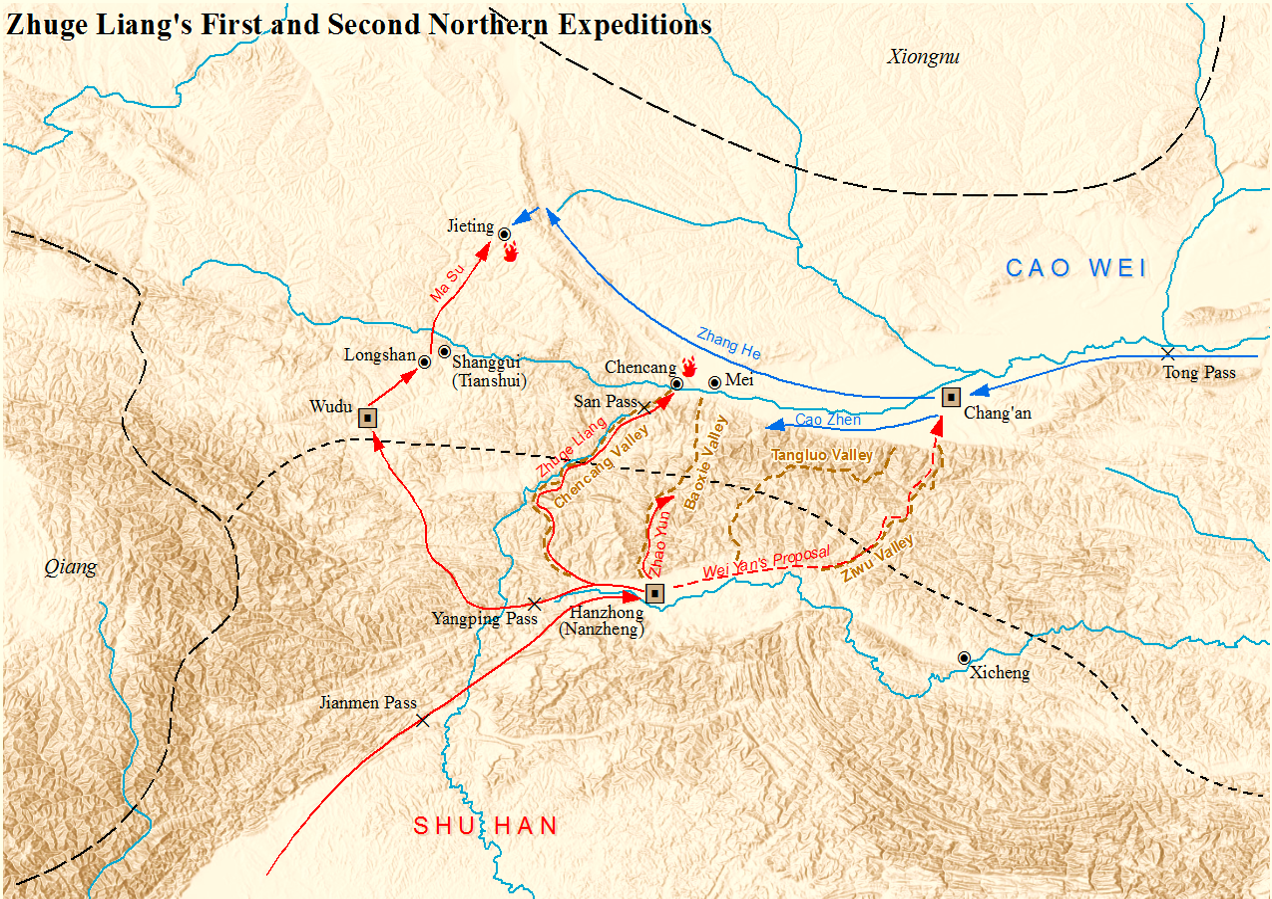
Zhuge Liang's first and second northern expeditions against Cao Wei

Jieting was a crucial region for securing supplies, and Zhuge Liang sent Ma Su and Wang Ping to guard the region. Ma Su went accompanied by Wang Ping but did not listen to his sound military advice. Relying purely on books of military tactics, Ma Su chose to "take the high ground" and set up his base on the mountains instead of in a city as instructed by Zhuge Liang. He also ignored Wang Ping's advice to make camp in a valley well supplied with water. Wang Ping, however, managed to persuade Ma Su to give him command of a portion of the troops, and Wang Ping set up his base camp near Ma Su's camp, in order to offer assistance when Ma Su was in danger.

Due to this tactical mistake, the Wei army led by Zhang He encircled the hill, cut off the water supply to the Shu troops and defeated them. Amidst the panic, Ma Su is recorded to have left his post, leaving the army with no commander. Wang Ping rallied Ma Su's army and with only a handful of soldiers did his best to keep the retreat organized. He ordered his soldiers to beat their drums loudly to create the impression that reinforcements had arrived. Zhang He believed this to possibly be a sign of an ambush and so he did not pursue. When Zhuge Liang arrived, he attempted to defeat Zhang He; however, he did not find a way to win and so the Shu army had to retreat to Hanzhong.

Though he survived the battle, Ma Su's army suffered a heavy defeat. (Wang Ping was able to rally Ma Su's remaining troops and gather the Shu army's scattered supplies.) Thus, Ma Su was arrested and sentenced to execution by a reluctant and tearful Zhuge Liang. (Note: Although the text simply says that Ma Su died ("wugu"; 物故), the implication is clear that he was executed.)

== Aftermath ==
A large number of Shu Han's generals were punished. Ma Su was sentenced to death by Zhuge Liang as a way to soothe the masses. Zhang Xiu (張休) and Li Sheng (李盛) were also executed. According to the Jin Shu, Chen Shou's father (Note: The identity of Chen Shou's father is unknown.) was implicated and sentenced to kun (髡), a punishment involving the shaving of a person's head. Xiang Lang was dismissed from his position as chief clerk because he did not report that Ma Su fled due to their friendship. Huang Xi (黃襲) and other generals were relieved of the command of their soldiers by Zhuge Liang. Wang Ping, on the other hand, was promoted to General Who Attacks Bandits (討寇將軍) for his efforts in minimizing casualties and for trying to prevent Ma Su's actions. Zhuge Liang himself sent a memorial to the Emperor Liu Shan requesting to be demoted for the defeat at Jieting, which he was.

Before his execution, Ma Su wrote a letter to Zhuge Liang: "You wise lord regarded me like a son and myself looked upon you as a father. I dearly hope that this is the righteousness of the execution of Gun leading to the rise of Yu the Great. May our whole life's relationship not be reduced by this. Though I shall die, I shall bear no resentments against the yellow earth." At the time, many among the army wept for his death.

Because of the loss of Jieting, the supply situation became dire for Zhuge Liang's army and he had to retreat to his main base at Hanzhong while the Wei forces under Cao Zhen and Zhang He then used the opportunity to quell the rebellions in the three commanderies and restore peace. The defeat at Jieting caused the First Northern Expedition to result in failure.

== Location ==
The exact location of the battle is not certain; according to research by the Gansu Financial daily newspaper, there are several plausible locations:

- Jieting village, Maiji District, southeast of Tianshui
- Gongmen town, east of Zhangjiachuan County
- Jieting Mountain in Mian County, Shaanxi Province
- Longcheng town, east of Qin'an County, Gansu
- Other locations named by some are Huating and Zhuanglang

A memorial of the battle is located in Longcheng town. Topographical evidence and weapons found suggest that Longcheng is the most likely location, although there is no consensus among experts.

== In Romance of the Three Kingdoms ==
In the 14th-century historical novel Romance of the Three Kingdoms, Ma Su was executed on the order of a tearful Zhuge Liang, whose continued high appraisal for Ma's intelligence made that a very reluctant decision. The scene has also been reenacted in Chinese opera. A Chinese proverb, "wiping away tears and executing Ma Su" (挥泪斩马谡; 揮淚斬馬謖; Huī Lèi Zhán Mǎ Sù), refers specifically to this incident, meaning "punishing a person for his wrongdoings regardless of relations or his abilities. A Japanese equivalent is "tearfully executing Ma Su" (泣いて馬謖を斬る, Naite Bashoku wo kiru).

In the novel, the loss of Jieting exposed Zhuge Liang's current location, the defenceless Xicheng (西城). Zhuge Liang used the Empty Fort Strategy to ward off the enemy before retreating.

In many stories, including the novel, the battle includes Sima Yi on the Wei side, but this event is impossible according to his biography in the Records of the Three Kingdoms. Moss Roberts comments on this in his fourth volume of his English translation of Romance of the Three Kingdoms on (page 2179 under Chapter 95 Notes, fourth and last paragraph of the chapter notes):

The historical Sima Yi was not at the western front for the "vacant city ruse" but at the more important southern front with the Southland [Wu]. Sima Yi did not come to the western front until Kongming's [Zhuge Liang] fourth offensive [Battle of Mount Qi]. The fictional tradition tends to attach more importance to the Wei-Shu conflict than the Wei-Wu conflict, and Three Kingdoms accordingly builds up the Kongming-Sima Yi rivalry and the events of AD 228.

In the abstract theory above, Roberts explains and compares historic history with fictional tales and the most likely reason Sima Yi was included before the Battle of Mount Qi. Based on Robert's view of the fictional novel's tendency to build up the rivalry between Sima Yi and Zhuge Liang, and the contradiction of Sima Yi's location at the time of this event, some share Robert's opinion that the event did not happen. However, many historians agree that Sima Yi's absence alone cannot disprove the occurrence. The historical basis for the event comes from an anecdote shared by Guo Chong (郭沖) in the early Jin dynasty (266–420). The anecdote is translated as follows:

"Zhuge Liang garrisoned at Yangping (陽平; around present-day Hanzhong, Shaanxi) and ordered Wei Yan to lead the troops east. He left behind only 10,000 men to defend Yangping. Sima Yi led 200,000 troops to attack Zhuge Liang and he took a shortcut, bypassing Wei Yan's army and arriving at a place 60 li away from Zhuge Liang's location. Upon inspection, Sima Yi realised that Zhuge Liang's city was weakly defended. Zhuge Liang knew that Sima Yi was near, so he thought of recalling Wei Yan's army back to counter Sima Yi, but it was too late already and his men were worried and terrified. Zhuge Liang remained calm and instructed his men to hide all flags and banners and silence the war drums. He then ordered all the gates to be opened and told his men to sweep and dust the ground. Sima Yi was under the impression that Zhuge Liang was cautious and prudent, and he was baffled by the sight before him and suspected that there was an ambush. He then withdrew his troops. The following day, Zhuge Liang clapped his hands, laughed, and told an aide that Sima Yi thought that there was an ambush and had retreated. Later, his scouts returned and reported that Sima Yi had indeed retreated. Sima Yi was very upset when he found out later."

Later, in the fifth century, Pei Songzhi added the anecdote as an annotation to Zhuge Liang's biography in the Sanguozhi. Since Zhuge Liang wrote on the use of this tactic in his compilation work, "Thirty Six Stratagems", going so far as to detail how the psychology employed works, and why:

"When the enemy is superior in numbers and your situation is such that you expect to be overrun at any moment, then drop all pretense of military preparedness, act calmly, and taunt the enemy, so that the enemy will think you have a huge ambush hidden for them. It works best by acting calm and at ease when your enemy expects you to be tense. This ploy is only successful if in most cases you do have a powerful hidden force and only sparsely use the empty fort strategy."

Also worthy of note is that Zhuge Liang wrote this passage in his sixth chapter, titled "Desperate Stratagems", (敗戰計／败战计, Bài zhàn jì), further supporting the implication that he had experience in using this tactic, and his description does match the situation described by Guo Chong. However, there are a number of texts that dispute the accuracy of Guo Chong's anecdote.
