= Longcheng, Tianshui =

Longcheng 陇城镇
- Town
- Location within Gansu Location within China
- Coordinates: 35.0020074°N 105.9718660°E
- Country: China
- Province: Gansu
- City: Tianshui
- County: Qin'an

Area
  - Total: 78.9 km^{2} (30.5 sq mi)

Population (2012)
  - Total: 32,000

Longcheng is a town of Qin'an County, Tianshui, Gansu, China. It is located about 45 km (28 mi) from the seat of Qin'an County. In 2012 it had a population of 32,000, of which around 10,000 lived in the town's main village.

In 228, the Battle of Jieting was likely fought at the present location of Longcheng.

During the Sui dynasty it was the center of Longcheng Commandery; in the Song dynasty it was a fortress town. During the Republic of China era it was known as Longcheng District. In 1965 it became a community, and in 1984 it was changed to a township. In 2003 it was upgraded to a town.

The town has several historical sites:

- Nüwa cave
- Bagua city site
- Xifan temple
- Battle of Jieting memorial
