= Niu Jin =

3rd-century Chinese general serving warlord Cao Cao

- 牛金

General of the Rear (後將軍)
- In office 238 – ?
- Monarchs: Cao Rui, Cao Fang?

Personal details
- Born: Unknown; before 208
- Died: Unknown; in or after 238
- Occupation: General

Niu Jin (fl. 208–238) was a military general serving under the warlord Cao Cao during the late Eastern Han dynasty of China. He continued serving in the state of Cao Wei, founded by Cao Cao's successor Cao Pi, during the Three Kingdoms period of China.

== Life ==
Niu Jin participated in the Battle of Jiangling of 208, during which he volunteered to lead 300 horsemen to attack the enemy, but was only saved by Cao Ren when he got surrounded.

Years later, during Cao Rui's reign, he participated in the counter-attack against the invading Shu forces in 231 and scored a victory over Zhuge Liang's unit, and pursued him to Mount Qi. In 234, he soundly defeated the Shu general Ma Dai on the battlefield and killed thousands of enemies. In 238, he followed Sima Yi on his campaign against Gongsun Yuan and was promoted to General of the Rear (後將軍).

However, Niu Jin's accomplishments in his later years allegedly only earned him the apprehension from the Simas, thus he was ordered to commit suicide by drinking poison. (Note: In the Twenty-Four Histories, the earliest record of Niu Jin being poisoned by Sima Yi was found in the Book of Song (compiled late 5th century) by Shen Yue; according to this account, after the poisoning, Sima Shi asked his father why Niu Jin was killed despite his usefulness. The account in the Book of Song also recorded that Emperor Yuan was the illegitimate child of his mother and a man surnamed Niu.) The exact reasons for his death as well as the year he died remain disputed. The Yuan Shi Juan states that the incident happened "after the Year of the Horse (Note: 238 is a Year of the Horse. Since the next Year of the Horse is 250, by this theory, Niu Jin died after 238.)" and that Niu Jin was poisoned by drinking toxic wine. Other records state that it was because Niu Jin committed adultery with one of the Sima relatives and was assassinated with poison arrows "during the Year of the Cow". (Note: 245 is a Year of the Cow. Since the next Year of the Cow is 257, by this theory, Niu Jin died in 245.) According to the rumor which was recorded in several historical accounts, an illegitimate child born in the Sima family was actually the biological son of Niu Jin. The product of the affair between Niu Jin and the anonymous wife of a Sima family member was the future Emperor Yuan of Jin. Other historical records that mentioned this affair were Hè Lín Yù Lù, an anecdotal novel written by Luo Dajing during the Song dynasty; Rong Zhai Sui Bi, written by Hong Mai during the Southern Song dynasty; and Bin Tui Lu, unofficial historical notes written by Zhao Shanzheng during the Ming dynasty.

A story from unknown origin also states that Niu Jin was killed since he was actually a distant relative of the former emperor; his death date and the accuracy of this statement are difficult to verify.

== In Romance of the Three Kingdoms ==
In the 14th-century historical novel Romance of the Three Kingdoms, Niu Jin was one of Cao Ren's subordinates. He chased Gan Ning back to Yiling during the battle of Jiangling, but was surrounded by reinforcements led by Zhou Yu, and was ultimately defeated. Niu Jin then regrouped and planned a night attack on Zhou Yu's camp, but in the end he was once again beaten, suffering another great loss.

== See also ==
- Lists of people of the Three Kingdoms
