= Qin'an County =

Qin'an County 秦安县
- County
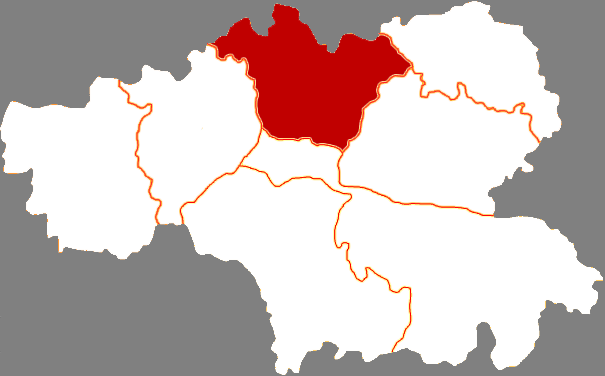
- Qin'an in Tianshui

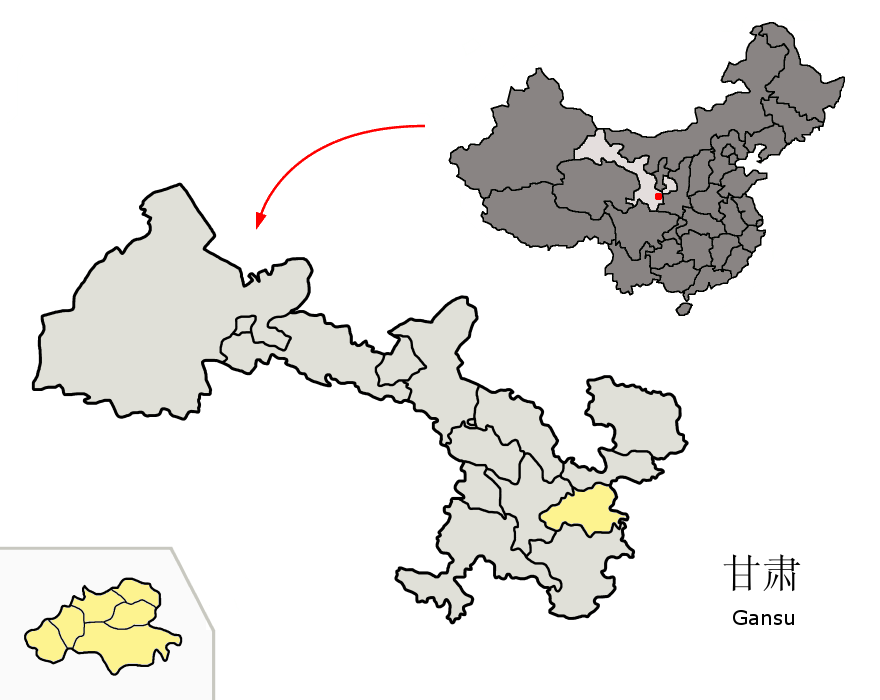
- Tianshui in Gansu
- Coordinates: 34°51′33″N 105°40′33″E
- Country: China
- Province: Gansu
- Prefecture-level city: Tianshui
- County seat: Xingguo

Area
  - Total: 1,601.13 km^{2} (618.20 sq mi)

Population (2017)
  - Total: 539,797
  - Density: 337.135/km^{2} (873.176/sq mi)
- Time zone: UTC+8 (China Standard)
- Postal code: 741600

Qin'an County (Chinese: 秦安县; pinyin: Qín'ān Xiàn) is a county in the east of Gansu province, China. It is under the administration of the prefecture-level city of Tianshui. Its postal code is 741600, and in 1999 its population was 567,553 people. As of 2018, the population is 618,000 people. It is one of the poorest counties of Gansu, being appointed as one of 23 counties part of a provincial poverty alleviation project.

== History ==
The area has been inhabited since prehistoric times, as evidenced by 68 Neolithic cultural sites including the Dadiwan culture.

It is reputedly the county where Zhuge Liang's troops, commanded by Ma Su, were defeated by Zhang He at the Battle of Jieting.

Known historically as Chengji (成紀), it vied with Tianshui (then known as Shanggui) as the seat of the medieval province of Qinzhou during the Tang dynasty and Five Dynasties eras.

== Culture ==
Qin'an celebrates the Nüwa festival, a sacrifice festival for the mother goddess. It is celebrated yearly on the 15th of the third lunar calendar months.

== Administrative divisions ==
Qin'an County governs 17 towns, which govern over a total of 6 residential communities and 428 villages.

Towns

- Xingguo (兴国镇)
- Guojiazhen (郭嘉镇)
- Xichuan (西川镇)
- Lianhua (莲花镇)
- Longcheng (陇城镇)

-Towns are upgraded from Township.

- Wuying (五营镇)
- Anfu (安伏镇)
- Liuping (刘坪镇)
- Yunshan (云山镇)
- Weidian (魏店镇)
- Zhongshan (中山镇)
- Yebao (叶堡镇)
- Xingfeng (兴丰镇)
- Wangyin (王尹镇)
- Wangyao (王窑镇)
- Wangpu (王铺镇)
- Qianhu (千户镇)

== Climate ==
Climate data for Qin'an, elevation 1,216 m (3,990 ft), (1991–2020 normals, extremes 1981–2010)
Month	Jan	Feb	Mar	Apr	May	Jun	Jul	Aug	Sep	Oct	Nov	Dec	Year
Record high °C (°F)	14.3 (57.7)	19.9 (67.8)	27.5 (81.5)	32.1 (89.8)	33.3 (91.9)	36.5 (97.7)	37.9 (100.2)	36.3 (97.3)	36.1 (97.0)	28.3 (82.9)	21.4 (70.5)	13.7 (56.7)	37.9 (100.2)
Mean daily maximum °C (°F)	4.1 (39.4)	8.0 (46.4)	14.0 (57.2)	20.6 (69.1)	24.5 (76.1)	28.0 (82.4)	29.7 (85.5)	28.4 (83.1)	22.8 (73.0)	17.0 (62.6)	11.2 (52.2)	5.5 (41.9)	17.8 (64.1)
Daily mean °C (°F)	−2.4 (27.7)	1.6 (34.9)	7.3 (45.1)	13.3 (55.9)	17.4 (63.3)	21.2 (70.2)	23.4 (74.1)	22.2 (72.0)	17.1 (62.8)	11.0 (51.8)	4.6 (40.3)	−1.2 (29.8)	11.3 (52.3)
Mean daily minimum °C (°F)	−6.8 (19.8)	−2.9 (26.8)	2.1 (35.8)	7.1 (44.8)	11.2 (52.2)	15.3 (59.5)	18.2 (64.8)	17.3 (63.1)	13.1 (55.6)	7.0 (44.6)	0.3 (32.5)	−5.5 (22.1)	6.4 (43.5)
Record low °C (°F)	−16.5 (2.3)	−14.5 (5.9)	−9.5 (14.9)	−3.8 (25.2)	0.0 (32.0)	5.9 (42.6)	10.9 (51.6)	9.2 (48.6)	3.6 (38.5)	−6.2 (20.8)	−12.8 (9.0)	−18.9 (−2.0)	−18.9 (−2.0)
Average precipitation mm (inches)	5.3 (0.21)	6.1 (0.24)	14.2 (0.56)	27.4 (1.08)	49.4 (1.94)	65.5 (2.58)	79.2 (3.12)	72.3 (2.85)	68.1 (2.68)	39.4 (1.55)	9.4 (0.37)	2.8 (0.11)	439.1 (17.29)
Average precipitation days (≥ 0.1 mm)	5.2	5.0	6.6	7.3	9.6	10.3	10.7	10.6	12.0	10.2	5.7	3.0	96.2
Average snowy days	8.0	6.4	2.6	0.4	0	0	0	0	0	0.1	2.6	4.6	24.7
Average relative humidity (%)	64	61	57	54	58	63	67	70	76	78	73	66	66
Mean monthly sunshine hours	140.6	132.8	164.6	198.3	209.8	198.8	200.6	189.8	124.8	120.5	128.1	143.1	1,951.8
Percentage possible sunshine	45	43	44	50	48	46	46	46	34	35	42	47	44
Source: China Meteorological Administration

== See also ==
- List of administrative divisions of Gansu
