= Cao Ren =

Chinese Han dynasty and Cao Wei general (168–223)

- 曹仁
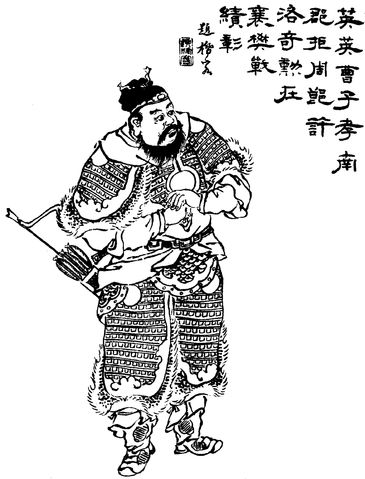
- A Qing dynasty illustration of Cao Ren

Grand Marshal (大司馬)
- In office 14 December 221 – 6 May 223
- Monarch: Cao Pi

General-in-Chief (大將軍)
- In office May / June – 14 December 221
- Monarch: Cao Pi

General of Chariots and Cavalry (車騎將軍)
- In office 220 – May / June 221
- Monarch: Cao Pi

General Who Attacks the South (征南將軍)
- In office c. 210s – 220
- Monarch: Emperor Xian of Han
- Chancellor: Cao Cao

Personal details
- Born: 168 (Note: Cao Ren's biography in the Sanguozhi recorded that he died in the 4th year of the Huangchu era of Cao Pi's reign. Cao Pi's biography in the Sanguozhi recorded a more precise date: The dingwei day of the 3rd month of the 4th year of the Huangchu era of Cao Pi's reign. This date corresponds to 6 May 223 in the Gregorian calendar. The Wei Shu further recorded that Cao Ren was 56 years old (by East Asian age reckoning) when he died. By calculation, Cao Ren's year of birth should be 168.)
- Died: 6 May 223 (aged 55)
- Children: Cao Tai; Cao Kai; Cao Fan
- Parent: Cao Chi (father)
- Relatives: Cao Chun (brother); Cao Cao (cousin)
- Occupation: General
- Courtesy name: Zixiao (子孝)
- Posthumous name: Marquis Zhong (忠侯)
- Peerage: Marquis of Chen (陳侯)

Cao Ren (168 – 6 May 223), courtesy name Zixiao, was a military general serving during the late Eastern Han dynasty of China under the warlord Cao Cao, who was also his older second cousin. He continued serving in the state of Cao Wei – founded by Cao Cao's son and successor, Cao Pi – during the Three Kingdoms period. He played a significant part in assisting Cao Cao in the civil wars leading to the end of the Han dynasty. He was appointed as the Grand Marshal (大司馬) when Cao Pi ascended the throne, and was also credited by the latter for the establishment of Wei. However, Cao Ren was also once derided as a mediocre commander by Zhu Huan, a general from Wei's rival state Eastern Wu.

== Early life ==
Cao Ren was a younger second cousin of Cao Cao. His grandfather Cao Bao (曹襃) and father Cao Chi (曹熾) served in the government of the Eastern Han dynasty. He had a younger full brother, Cao Chun. As their father died when they were still young, Cao Ren and Cao Chun lived with another family. They inherited their family fortune when they became older. They were known for being wealthy and having hundreds of servants and retainers.

As a youth, Cao Ren was fond of horse-riding, archery and hunting. When chaos broke out in China towards the end of the Han dynasty, Cao Ren rallied a militia of over 1,000 men and they wandered around the region near the Huai and Si rivers. Cao Ren and his followers eventually joined Cao Cao around 190 when the latter was raising an army to join the campaign against Dong Zhuo. Cao Ren held the rank of a Major of Separate Command (別部司馬) under Cao Cao but he was actually an acting Sharp Edge Colonel (厲鋒校尉).

== Campaigns in central China ==
Throughout the 190s, Cao Ren followed Cao Cao on various campaigns against rival warlords in central China. He made great contributions in the campaign against Yuan Shu between 197 and 199. When Cao Cao invaded Xu Province from 193–194 to attack the provincial governor Tao Qian, Cao Ren was in charge of the cavalry and he led the vanguard. He defeated Tao Qian's general Lü You (呂由) and led his force to rendezvous with Cao Cao's main army at Pengcheng (彭城; present-day Xuzhou, Jiangsu), where they scored a major victory over Tao Qian's forces. Cao Ren and his cavalry later defeated Tao Qian's subordinates in various battles at the counties in Xu Province. During the conflict between Cao Cao and Lü Bu, Cao Ren attacked Lü Bu's subordinate Liu He (劉何) at Gouyang (勾陽) and captured the enemy commander alive.

After Cao Cao had defeated the Yellow Turban rebels, he received Emperor Xian (who had escaped from the clutches of Li Jue and Guo Si) and set up the new capital at Xu (許; present-day Xuchang, Henan) in 196. Cao Ren was appointed as the Administrator (太守) of Guangyang Commandery (廣陽郡) for his achievements. However, Cao Ren never exercised governorship over his jurisdiction because Cao Cao appreciated his military skills and kept him by his side in Xu. Cao Ren was still in charge of the cavalry even though he held the position of a civil official as a Consultant (議郎).

The following year, Cao Ren followed Cao Cao on a campaign against the warlord Zhang Xiu, and was authorised to lead a separate force to raid the counties around Zhang Xiu's base in Wan (宛; or Wancheng, present-day Wancheng District, Nanyang, Henan) and he captured over 3,000 civilians. Zhang Xiu surrendered to Cao Cao initially, but rebelled later and launched a surprise attack, which led to the Battle of Wancheng. Cao Cao was defeated and he retreated after his forces succeeded in repelling further attacks by Zhang Xiu. However, as they were withdrawing, Zhang Xiu attacked again and Cao Cao's men were unable to drive the enemy away. The morale of Cao Cao's army started falling but Cao Ren helped to raise the soldiers' spirits by encouraging and inspiring them. Cao Cao was very impressed with Cao Ren, and he managed to defeat Zhang Xiu later in a counterattack.

== Campaign against Yuan Shao ==
In 200, when the forces of Cao Cao and Yuan Shao were locked in a stalemate at the Battle of Guandu, Yuan sent Liu Bei with an army to support the rebellions against Cao Cao in Yinjiang (㶏疆; southwest of present-day Xuchang, Henan), roughly 8.3 km south of the capital. Cao Cao became worried about such developments in the territories under his control, so he sent Cao Ren to suppress the uprisings. Cao Ren observed that the rebels dared to create trouble because they had Liu Bei's support, but the men under Liu were newly recruited and inexperienced, so it was not difficult to defeat them. Cao Ren targeted the rebel chief Liu Pi and killed him in battle, and subsequently defeated Liu Bei as well. Yuan Shao attempted to cut off Cao Cao's route to the west by sending Han Meng (韓猛) southwest. Cao Ren responded to the threat by defeating Han Meng at Jiluo Hill (雞洛山; located 50 li northeast of present-day Xinmi, Henan). Yuan Shao became afraid and did not dare to send out his troops. Cao Ren and Shi Huan (史渙) later led a force to attack a convoy transporting supplies to Yuan Shao's camp and destroyed the food supplies.

After Cao Cao's victory at Guandu, Cao Ren continued to join Cao Cao in his campaigns against Yuan Shao's heirs in the early 3rd century. During one battle near Hu Pass (壺關; present-day Huguan County, Shanxi), Cao Cao gave orders that all the enemy troops would be buried alive after the city fell. However, after several days of siege, Cao Cao's forces were unable to capture the city. Cao Ren then told Cao Cao, "When we besiege a city, we must leave the defenders with a final option of surrendering. Now, as you've already said that the defenders would be slaughtered after the city is taken, all of them would definitely put up fierce resistance. Besides, the city's fortifications are strong and the defenders have much supplies, so our forces would suffer heavy casualties if we attack, and we will be held up here if we switch to a defensive stance. It's not a wise choice to besiege a city whose defenders are willing to fight to the death." Cao Cao heeded Cao Ren's advice, and the enemy surrendered later. After the campaign, Cao Ren received the title of a "Marquis of a Chief Village" (都亭侯) for his contributions.

== Battle of Jiangling, and campaigns in northwest China ==
In 208, after losing to Sun Quan and Liu Bei at the Battle of Red Cliffs, Cao Cao retreated north and left Cao Ren and Xu Huang to defend the strategic Jiangling Commandery (江陵郡; in present-day Jingzhou, Hubei) from the advances of Sun Quan's forces, which were led by Zhou Yu. Cao Ren was serving as acting General Who Attacks the South (征南將軍) then. Zhou Yu despatched a several thousand-strong vanguard to challenge Cao Cao's forces at Jiangling. Cao Ren was aware that his army's morale was low, since they were recently defeated at Red Cliffs, so he ordered his subordinate Niu Jin to lead 300 volunteer soldiers into battle, in the hope that they would display bravery and boost his men's morale. Niu Jin and his men were heavily outnumbered and surrounded by the enemy. Cao Ren's Chief Clerk (長史), Chen Jiao (陳矯), turned pale when he saw the situation from the top of the city walls. However, unlike what everyone thought, Niu Jin managed to create havoc around the Wu's army with just 100 men left by then. Cao Ren experienced a surge of fury and courage after watching how Niu Jin with so little men could make the entire Wu army three times the strength get so tired battling just 300 of his own men, so he ordered every troop in the city to be prepared to go into battle. Chen Jiao and the others attempted to dissuade him from braving danger, but Cao Ren ignored them and every soldiers in his command was ordered to charged into the enemy formation. Cao Ren successfully rescued Niu Jin and his surviving men and even turned back to save his remaining soldiers who were still trapped in the enemy formation. Sun Quan's forces retreated. When Cao Ren returned, his subordinates exclaimed, "General, you're truly a man from Heaven!" The troops were awed by Cao Ren's bravery, and Cao Cao was very impressed when he heard about this incident. Cao Ren's marquis title was changed to "Marquis of Anping Village" (安平亭侯).

Around 211, Cao Ren participated in Cao Cao's campaigns against a coalition of northwestern warlords led by Ma Chao and Han Sui, which led to the Battle of Tong Pass. Cao Ren held the appointment of acting General Who Stabilises the West (安西將軍) and commanded the defence at Tong Pass (潼關; present-day Tongguan County, Weinan, Shaanxi) before Cao Cao reached the frontline.

When Su Bo (蘇伯) and Tian Yin (田銀) rebelled in 212, Cao Ren was appointed acting General of Valiant Cavalry (驍騎將軍) and he led seven armies to attack the rebels and defeated them.

== Battle of Fancheng ==
Cao Ren was reappointed acting General Who Attacks the South (征南將軍) was ordered to garrison at Fan (樊; also called Fancheng, in present-day Fancheng District, Xiangfan, Hubei) and oversee Cao Cao's forces in Jing Province. Cao Ren suppressed a rebellion led by Hou Yin (侯音) before massacring the population of Wan (宛; present-day Wancheng District, Nanyang, Henan) between late 218 and early 219, he was then officially commissioned as General Who Attacks the South and he continued to garrison at Fan.

In the autumn of 219, Liu Bei's general Guan Yu, who was in charge of Liu's territories in southern Jing Province, led an army north to attack Fan. Cao Cao sent the general Yu Jin to lead seven armies to resist Guan Yu, but the armies were destroyed in a flood when the Han River overflowed due to heavy rains. Yu Jin surrendered to Guan Yu while his subordinate Pang De refused and was executed by Guan. Cao Ren was left with a few thousand troops to defend Fan. Guan Yu and his forces sailed towards Fan on boats and besieged the fortress. By then, Cao Ren and his troops had been completely isolated inside Fan as they had lost contact with outside, while their supplies were running out and there were no reinforcements in sight. Cao Ren encouraged his men to fight to the death and they were very inspired by his words. By the time reinforcements led by Xu Huang arrived, the water level had subsided slightly. While Xu Huang was attacking Guan Yu, Cao Ren seized the opportunity to counterattack and break the siege. Guan Yu failed to conquer Fan so he retreated.

== Service under Cao Pi ==
Although Cao Ren behaved brashly and had no regard for laws when he was young, but after he joined the Cao Cao's Army, he started following rules and regulations strictly and he went by the book in everything he did. Once, when Cao Cao's son Cao Zhang was on away on a campaign against the Wuhuan, his brother Cao Pi wrote to him, "Shouldn't you follow rules and regulations in the same way Cao Ren does?"

Cao Cao died in 220 and was succeeded as King of Wei by Cao Pi. Later that year, Cao Pi, with the support of all the officials, made Emperor Xian to pass the throne to him, finally putting an end to the crumbling Han dynasty, and established the state of Cao Wei, the strongest of the three Kingdoms. Cao Ren was appointed as General of Chariots and Cavalry (車騎將軍) and was placed in charge of military affairs in Jing, Yang and Yi provinces. He also received the title "Marquis of Chen" (陳侯) and was given 2,000 more taxable households in his marquisate, making it a total of 3,500 households.

Cao Ren moved to Wan (宛; present-day Wancheng District, Nanyang, Henan) in northern Jing Province and garrisoned there. Later, when Sun Quan sent Chen Shao (陳邵) to attack Xiangyang, Emperor Wen(Cao pi) ordered Cao Ren to lead an army to Xiangyang to resist Sun Quan's forces. Cao Ren and Xu Huang defeated Chen Shao and their forces entered Xiangyang. Cao Ren had the general Gao Qian (高遷) oversee the relocation of civilians from the southern bank of the Han River to the north. Emperor Wen appointed Cao Ren as General-in-Chief (大將軍). Later, Emperor Wen ordered Cao Ren to move to Linying (臨潁) and promoted him to Grand Marshal (大司馬). Cao Ren was placed in charge of the armies along the Wu River (烏江) and he garrisoned at Hefei. In 222, Cao Ren led several tens of thousands men to assail Sun Quan's garrison at Ruxu (濡須; north of present-day Wuwei County, Anhui), where the defending general, Zhu Huan, had only 5,000 troops remaining inside the city walls. However, Cao Ren was deemed only as an inferior commander by Zhu Huan and his colleagues, so the defenders put up a staunch defence. Even though Cao Ren had a complete numerical advantage, the battle concluded with Zhu Huan as the victor – Cao Ren lost not only over 1,000 men, but also two of his subordinates, Chang Diao (常雕) and Wang Shuang.

== Death ==
Cao Ren died on 6 May 223 at the age of 56 (by East Asian age reckoning). He was posthumously granted the title "Marquis Zhong" (忠侯), which literally means "loyal marquis". He was best remembered for his bravery and courage, which placed him above Zhang Liao among all of Cao Cao's generals.

== Family ==
Cao Ren's grandfather Cao Bao (曹褒) served as the Administrator (太守) of Yingchuan Commandery (潁川郡) in the Eastern Han dynasty. Cao Ren's father Cao Chi (曹熾) also served as a Palace Attendant and Changshui Colonel (長水校尉) in the Eastern Han dynasty, and was posthumously awarded the title "Marquis Mu of Chen" (陳穆侯) by Cao Pi. Cao Ren's younger brother Cao Chun was also a general under Cao Cao.

Cao Ren's titles were inherited by his son Cao Tai (曹泰), who served as General Who Guards the East (鎮東將軍) and later had his marquis title changed to "Marquis of Ningling" (寗陵侯). Cao Tai was succeeded by his son Cao Chu (曹初). Cao Ren's other sons (Cao Tai's younger brothers) Cao Kai (曹楷) and Cao Fan (曹範) also received marquis titles.

== In popular culture ==
Cao Ren is featured as a playable character in Koei's Dynasty Warriors and Warriors Orochi video game series.

In the collectible card game Magic: The Gathering there is a card named "Cao Ren, Wei Commander" in the Portal Three Kingdoms set.

== See also ==
- Lists of people of the Three Kingdoms
