= Lü Meng's invasion of Jing Province =

Battle between warlords Sun Quan and Liu Bei (219–220)

- Part of the end of the Han dynasty
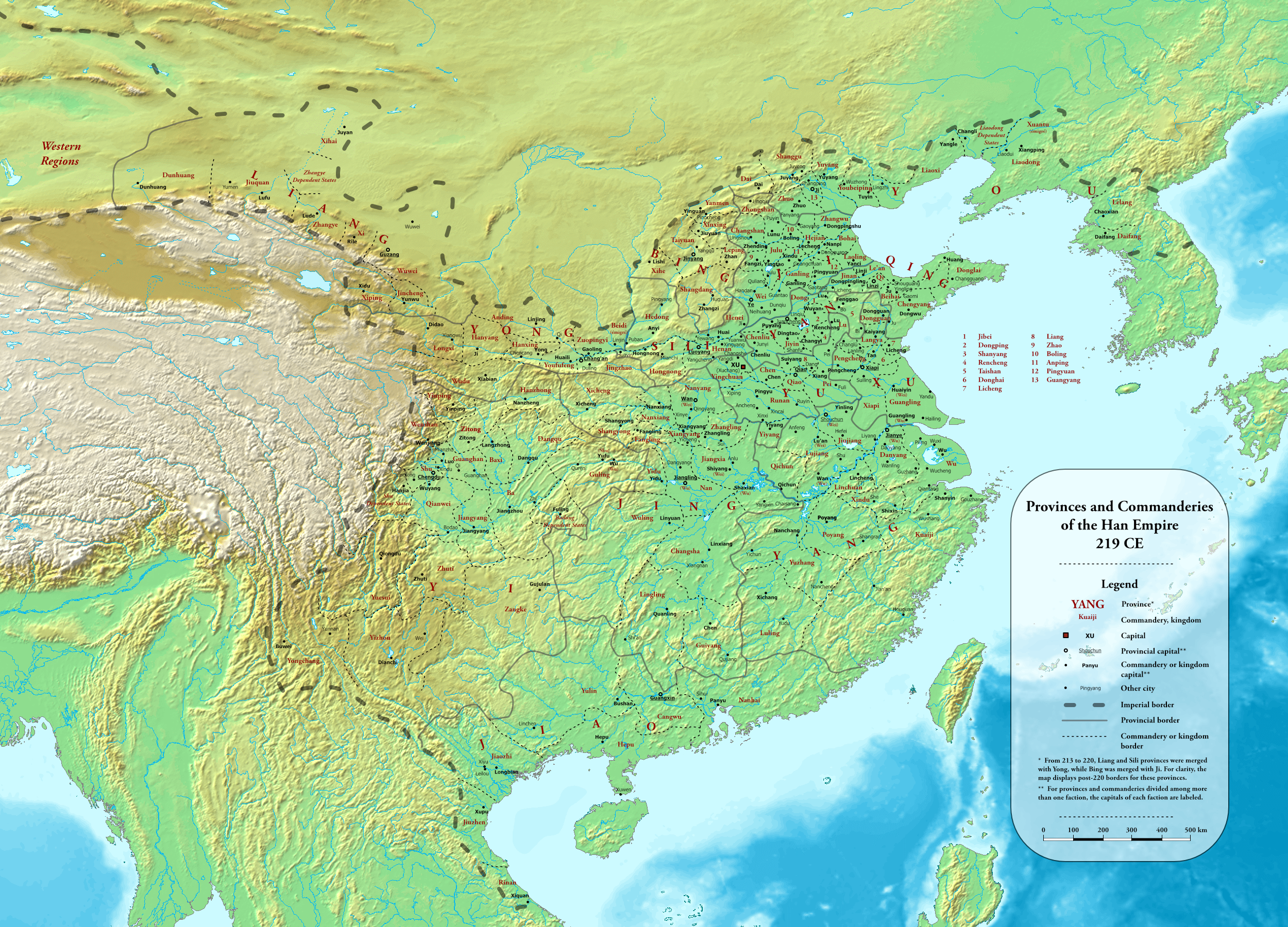
- A map of the Han dynasty in 219. Jing Province is located in the map's centre.
Date	c. November 219 – February 220
Location	Jing Province, Han dynasty
Result	Sun Quan victory

Belligerents
Sun Quan	Liu Bei

Commanders and leaders
Lü Meng; Lu Xun; Zhu Ran; Pan Zhang	Guan Yu (executed); Guan Ping (executed); Liao Hua (POW); Zhao Lei (POW); Mi Fang (surrendered); Shi Ren (surrendered); Pan Jun (surrendered)

Lü Meng's invasion of Jing Province
- Traditional Chinese: 呂蒙攻取荊州之戰
- Simplified Chinese: 吕蒙攻取荆州之战
Transcriptions
Standard Mandarin
- Hanyu Pinyin: Lǚ Méng Gōngqǔ Jīngzhōu Zhī Zhàn
Yue: Cantonese
- Jyutping: Leoi5 Mung4 Gung1ceoi2 Ging1zau1 Zi1 Zin3

Lü Meng's invasion of Jing Province was fought between the warlords Sun Quan and Liu Bei in the winter of 219–220 in the late Eastern Han dynasty. Sun Quan's forces, led by Lü Meng, invaded Liu Bei's territories in southern Jing Province, which covered present-day Hubei and Hunan. The campaign occurred after the Battle of Fancheng and concluded with victory for Sun Quan's forces, who completely captured all of Liu Bei's territories. Guan Yu, Liu Bei's general guarding those territories, was captured and executed by Sun Quan's forces. The fall of Jing Province and Guan Yu's death provided the trigger for the Battle of Xiaoting between Liu Bei and Sun Quan between 221 and 222.

== Background ==
=== Sun Quan "lending" Jing Province to Liu Bei ===
In 210, Liu Bei travelled to Jing (京; present-day Zhenjiang, Jiangsu) to meet Sun Quan and make a request for the governorship of Jing Province. Lu Su advised Sun Quan to "lend" Nan Commandery (南郡; around present-day Jingzhou, Hubei), the administrative centre of southern Jing Province, to Liu Bei to strengthen the Sun–Liu alliance against their common rival, Cao Cao. He argued that since Sun Quan's forces had just recently occupied Nan Commandery after the Battle of Jiangling, they would not be able to defend Nan Commandery well if Cao Cao's forces attacked, so it would be better to "lend" it to Liu Bei and let him serve as a "buffer" against Cao Cao. Sun Quan then agreed to "lend" Nan Commandery to Liu Bei. Sun Quan also decided to have his younger sister, Lady Sun, marry Liu Bei to further strengthen the alliance between the two kingdoms.

In the meantime, Liu Bei had also conquered the four commanderies of Wuling (武陵; around present-day Changde, Hunan), Changsha (長沙), Guiyang (桂陽; around present-day Chenzhou, Hunan) and Lingling (零陵; around present-day Yongzhou, Hunan) so he effectively controlled all the territories in southern Jing Province by 211.

=== Sun–Liu territorial dispute ===
Between 212 and 214, Liu Bei embarked on a campaign to seize control of Yi Province (covering present-day Sichuan and Chongqing) from its governor, Liu Zhang. He left Guan Yu behind to guard his territories in Jing Province during his absence.

At the time, tensions were rising at the Sun–Liu border in Jing Province as both sides became more suspicious and wary of each other. Around July 215, Sun Quan asked Liu Bei to "return" three commanderies in southern Jing Province – Changsha, Lingling and Guiyang – since the latter already had a new base in Yi Province. When Liu Bei refused, Sun Quan decided to seize the three commanderies by force. He stationed himself at Lukou (陸口; at Lushui Lake near present-day Chibi, Hubei) while ordering Lü Meng to lead troops to attack the three commanderies and Lu Su to lead 10,000 troops to Yiyang to block Guan Yu. After Lü Meng succeeded in capturing Lingling by trickery and persuading the administrators of Changsha and Guiyang to surrender to Sun Quan's side, he then led his troops to Yiyang to reinforce Lu Su. When Liu Bei heard about it, he returned to Gong'an County and ordered Guan Yu to lead an army to stop Lü Meng.

During this time, Guan Yu had a standoff with Lu Su at Yiyang, where he planned to lead 5,000 elite soldiers to cross the upstream shallows at night. In response, Lu Su ordered Gan Ning to lead 1,000 troops to guard their side of the shallows. Guan Yu did not dare to cross the shallows and instead ordered his men to make camp on their side. The shallows were thus named 'Guan Yu's Shallows' (關羽瀨).

Lu Su and Guan Yu then held talks to discuss the territorial dispute. During the negotiations, both sides stationed their soldiers more than 100 paces away from the meeting area and the officers present at the talks were each armed with only a blade weapon. Although the talks were inconclusive, the territorial dispute eventually ended by the end of August 215 when Liu Bei decided to give in upon learning that Cao Cao was attacking Hanzhong Commandery. As Hanzhong was the "northern gateway" into Yi Province, Cao Cao would pose a greater threat to Liu Bei's base in Yi Province if he succeeded in conquering Hanzhong, so Liu Bei had to switch to countering Cao Cao in Hanzhong. Liu Bei and Sun Quan then withdrew their forces after agreeing to divide southern Jing Province between them along the Xiang River.

=== Battle of Fancheng ===
In August 219, following Liu Bei's victory over Cao Cao in the Hanzhong Campaign in June that year, Guan Yu decided to follow up by attacking Cao Cao's stronghold at Fancheng (樊城; present-day Fancheng District, Xiangyang, Hubei), which was guarded by Cao Ren. Cao Cao ordered Yu Jin to lead reinforcements to help Cao Ren. It was in autumn and there were heavy showers so the Han River flooded and destroyed Yu Jin's reinforcements. Yu Jin himself surrendered to Guan Yu while his subordinate Pang De refused and was executed.

After Yu Jin's defeat, Cao Cao considered relocating the imperial capital from Xu (許; present-day Xuchang, Henan) further north into Hebei because Xu was too near enemy territory. However, Sima Yi and Jiang Ji reminded him that Sun Quan would feel restless if Guan Yu managed to capture Fancheng since he already felt uneasy about Liu Bei's growing influence. They suggested to Cao Cao to ally with Sun Quan and get him to help them hinder Guan Yu's advances. In return, Cao Cao would make peace with Sun Quan and recognise the legitimacy of Sun Quan's claim over the territories in the Jiangdong region. Cao Cao heeded their advice and later ordered Xu Huang to lead reinforcements to help Cao Ren. Xu Huang broke through Guan Yu's encirclement and routed his forces on the battlefield, thus lifting the siege on Fancheng. Guan Yu withdrew his forces after seeing that he could not capture Fancheng.

=== Guan Yu scorning Sun Quan ===
Earlier on, Sun Quan had sent a messenger to meet Guan Yu and propose a marriage between his son and Guan Yu's daughter. However, Guan Yu not only rejected the proposal, but also scolded and humiliated the messenger. Sun Quan was enraged.

After Yu Jin's surrender during the Battle of Fancheng, Guan Yu saw that his army lacked food supplies so he seized grain from one of Sun Quan's granaries at Xiang Pass (湘關).

== Lü Meng and Lu Xun putting Guan Yu off guard ==
When Lü Meng first heard that Guan Yu had led his troops to attack Fancheng, he wrote to Sun Quan:

"When Guan Yu went to attack Fan, he left behind many backup forces because he was afraid that I would seize the territories in his absence. I am often ill. Now, I request to return to Jianye under the guise of seeking medical treatment. When Guan Yu learns that I have left Jing Province, he will definitely withdraw the backup forces and move all out towards Xiangyang. When that happens, our troops will sail along the river, travelling day and night, and swiftly attack the weakly defended territories. We can thus conquer Nan Commandery and capture Guan Yu."

Sun Quan agreed to Lü Meng's plan and played along by openly approving Lü Meng's request to return to Jianye for medical treatment.

After Lü Meng returned to Jianye, he recommended Lu Xun to replace him as the frontline commander of Sun Quan's forces in Jing Province. He explained that although Lu Xun was talented and capable of assuming great responsibilities, he was still a relative nobody at the time so Guan Yu would not be wary of him. Sun Quan then commissioned Lu Xun as a Lieutenant-General and ordered him to go to Jing Province to take up Lü Meng's post at Lukou (陸口; at Lushui Lake near present-day Chibi, Hubei).

When Lu Xun first assumed his new appointment at Lukou, he wrote to Guan Yu to flatter him:

"Previously, I had the privilege of seeing you in action. You uphold good discipline in your army and achieved success with minimal effort. That is praiseworthy! Our enemy has been defeated. It is to our mutual benefit that we strengthen our alliance. Having received this piece of good news, I intend to pack up all my belongings and join you in striving to accomplish our lords' common goals. I am unintelligent, but I have received orders to travel to the west and take up this responsibility. I hope to catch a glimpse of your glory and receive some good advice from you."

Later, after Yu Jin surrendered to Guan Yu during the Battle of Fancheng, Lu Xun wrote again to Guan Yu:

"Now that Yu Jin and others have been captured, everyone far and near rejoices, and your feat will be praised for generations. Neither Duke Wen of Jin's victory at Chengpu nor the Marquis of Huaiyin's strategy in conquering Zhao can be compared to your achievement. I heard that Xu Huang and his forces are approaching and preparing for an offensive. Cao Cao is very cunning and his intentions are difficult to predict. I am afraid he might secretly increase the number of troops (in Xu Huang's army) to achieve his aim. Even though the enemy is weary, they still have some fighting spirit left in them. Every time after scoring a victory, there is a tendency for us to underestimate the enemy. The best military leaders in ancient times maintained their defences even after they won battles. I hope that you can make grander plans to secure a total victory. I am but a scholar, negligent and slow, and unworthy in many aspects. I am pleased to have a majestic and virtuous neighbour like you; I cannot contain my excitement. Even though we have not worked together yet, I always hope for such an opportunity. If you require my attention, I will pay my fullest attention."

Guan Yu fell for the ruse and lowered his guard against Lu Xun.

== Invasion of Jing Province ==
Map of present-day Hubei showing key locations of the invasion of Jing Province: Nan Commandery, Gong'an, Fancheng, Lukou, Xunyang, Maicheng and Linju.

By November 219, Sun Quan had already secretly agreed to ally with Cao Cao against Liu Bei. He ordered Lü Meng and others to lead troops to invade Liu Bei's territories in Jing Province while he followed behind with reinforcements. At Xunyang (尋陽; present-day Huangmei County, Hubei), Lü Meng ordered his men to hide in vessels disguised as civilian and merchant ships and sail towards Jiangling, the capital of Nan Commandery. Along the way, Lü Meng employed infiltration tactics to disable the surveillance towers set up along the river so that Guan Yu would be unaware of the invasion. This event is called "crossing the river in civilian clothing" (白衣渡江) in the 14th-century historical novel Romance of the Three Kingdoms.

== Surrenders of Mi Fang and Shi Ren ==
When Guan Yu embarked on the Fancheng campaign, he left his subordinates Mi Fang and Shi Ren behind to defend his key bases in Jing Province – Nan Commandery (南郡; around present-day Jingzhou, Hubei) and Gong'an County. Guan Yu had all along treated Mi Fang and Shi Ren with contempt. During the Battle of Fancheng, when Mi Fang and Shi Ren failed to ensure that sufficient supplies were delivered to Guan Yu's army at the frontline, an annoyed Guan Yu remarked, "I will deal with them when I return." Mi Fang and Shi Ren felt very uneasy after that.

During the invasion of Jing Province, Lü Meng showed understanding towards Mi Fang and successfully induced him into surrendering Nan Commandery. Yu Fan, one of Sun Quan's advisers, also managed to persuade Shi Ren to give up resistance and surrender Gong'an County. Liu Bei's territories in Jing Province largely fell under Sun Quan's control after the surrenders of Mi Fang and Shi Ren.

== Guan Yu's capture and execution ==
By the time Guan Yu retreated from Fancheng, Sun Quan's forces had occupied Nan Commandery and Gong'an County, and captured the families of Guan Yu's soldiers. Lü Meng ordered his troops to treat the civilians well and ensure that they were not harmed. Most of Guan Yu's soldiers lost their fighting spirit and deserted and went back to Jing Province to reunite with their families.

Guan Yu knew that he had been isolated so he withdrew to Maicheng (麥城; present-day Maicheng Village, Lianghe Town, Dangyang, Hubei) and later headed west towards Zhang District (漳鄉). At Zhang District, his remaining men deserted him and surrendered to Sun Quan's forces. Sun Quan sent Zhu Ran and Pan Zhang to block Guan Yu from retreating further west to Yi Province. Guan Yu, along with his son Guan Ping and subordinate Zhao Lei (趙累), were captured alive by Pan Zhang's deputy, Ma Zhong (馬忠), in an ambush. Guan Yu and Guan Ping were later executed by Sun Quan's forces in Linju (臨沮; present-day Nanzhang County, Hubei).

== Aftermath ==
=== Lu Xun's follow-up pacification of southern Jing Province ===
Although Sun Quan's forces successfully captured Guan Yu's key bases in southern Jing Province during the invasion, there were still some areas controlled by Liu Bei's forces or other forces hostile towards Sun Quan. Lu Xun followed up by sending his subordinates Li Yi (李異) and Xie Jing (謝旌) to lead 3,000 men to attack Liu Bei's forces led by Zhan Yan (詹晏) and Chen Feng (陳鳳). After Li Yi and Xie Jing defeated Zhan Yan and Chen Feng, they also attacked Fangling Commandery (房陵郡) and Nanxiang County (南鄉縣) respectively and captured these territories.

Wen Bu (文布) and Deng Kai (鄧凱), two influential men in Zigui County, rallied thousands of locals to form an army to attack Lu Xun in the west of southern Jing Province. In response, Lu Xun ordered Xie Jing to lead troops to attack them. After their defeat, Wen Bu and Deng Kai fled further west in Yi Province, where Liu Bei received them and appointed them as military officers. Lu Xun later managed to induce Wen Bu to lead his men to defect to Sun Quan's side.

=== Battle of Xiaoting ===
Two years later in 221, Liu Bei personally led his forces to attack Sun Quan, retake Jing Province and avenge Guan Yu. This led to the Battle of Xiaoting of 221–222 which ended with a decisive victory by Sun Quan's forces, under Lu Xun's command, over Liu Bei's forces. Liu Bei ultimately retreated to Baidicheng, where he died from illness on 10 April 223.

== Order of battle ==
Sun Quan forces

- General of Tiger's Might (虎威將軍) Lü Meng
  - Lieutenant-General (偏將軍) Lu Xun
    - Li Yi (李異)
    - Xie Jing (謝旌)
  - Lieutenant-General (偏將軍) Zhu Ran
  - Lieutenant-General (偏將軍) Pan Zhang
    - Major (司馬) Ma Zhong (馬忠)
  - Colonel of Loyalty and Righteousness (忠義校尉) Shi Yi
  - Central Major (中司馬) Zhuge Jin

Liu Bei forces

- (executed) General of the Vanguard (前將軍) Guan Yu
  - (executed) Guan Ping
  - (POW) Area Commander (都督) Zhao Lei (趙累)
  - (surrendered) Assistant Officer in Headquarters Office (治中從事) Pan Jun
  - (POW) Liao Hua
- (surrendered) Administrator of Nan Commandery (南郡太守) Mi Fang
- (surrendered) Shi Ren
- Assistant Officer in Wuling Commandery Office (武陵部從事) Fan Zhou (樊伷)
- † Administrator of Yidu (宜都郡守) Fan You (樊友)
- Zhan Yan (詹晏)
- (POW) Chen Feng (陳鳳)
- Administrator of Fangling (房陵太守) Deng Fu (鄧輔)
- Administrator of Nanxiang (南鄉太守) Guo Mu (郭睦)
- (surrendered) Wen Bu (文布)
- Deng Kai (鄧凱)

== In popular culture ==
The campaign is featured as a playable stage in some installments of Koei's video game series dynasty Warriors, in which it is known as the "Battle of Mai Castle". In some installments this battle is merged with the Battle of Fan Castle into one single stage. Some of Sun Quan's generals, such as Cheng Pu and Gan Ning, who did not participate in the battle in history, appeared in this stage.
