= Sun–Liu territorial dispute =

Conflict between warlords Sun Quan and Liu Bei (215)

- Part of the wars at the end of the Han dynasty
Date	c. July – August 215 (Note: The Zizhi Tongjian recorded that this conflict took place in the 6th month of the 20th year of the Jian'an era in the reign of Emperor Xian of Han. This month corresponds to 14 July to 12 August 215 in the Gregorian calendar.)
Location	Hubei and Hunan, China
Result	Peaceful settlement
Territorial changes	Division of territories between Sun Quan and Liu Bei's domains along the Xiang River

Belligerents
Sun Quan	Liu Bei

Commanders and leaders
Sun Quan; Lu Su; Lü Meng	Liu Bei; Guan Yu

Strength
At least 10,000	≈30,000 (Guan Yu's claim)

The Sun–Liu territorial dispute was a military conflict between the warlords Sun Quan and Liu Bei in 215 during the late Eastern Han dynasty of China. While Sun Quan and Liu Bei had initially formed an alliance in 208 against their common rival Cao Cao, both sides got into a territorial dispute over the territories in southern Jing Province (covering present-day Hubei and Hunan) in the early 210s. The dispute ended when both sides agreed to divide the territories along the Xiang River between their respective domains: Sun Quan took the lands east of the river while Liu Bei kept those west of the river. Despite a peaceful settlement to the territorial dispute, Sun Quan ultimately sent his forces to attack Liu Bei's territories in an invasion in 219 and succeeded in capturing all of them.

== Background ==
In the winter of 208, the warlords Liu Bei and Sun Quan formed an alliance to counter another warlord Cao Cao and defeated him at the decisive Battle of Red Cliffs. Shortly after the Battle of Red Cliffs, the allied forces followed up with the Battle of Jiangling and succeeded in capturing Jiangling County and the rest of Nan Commandery (南郡; around present-day Jingzhou, Hubei) from Cao Cao's forces.

After the Battle of Jiangling, Nan Commandery remained under the control of Sun Quan, who appointed his general Zhou Yu as the commandery's administrator. The commandery's administrative centre was at Jiangling County and its jurisdiction included the counties of Xiajun (下雋; northwest of present-day Tongcheng County, Hubei), Hanchang (漢昌; southeast of present-day Pingjiang County, Hunan), Liuyang and Zhouling (州陵; northeast of present-day Honghu, Hubei).

In the meantime, Liu Bei nominated Liu Qi, the elder son of Jing Province's former governor Liu Biao, to succeed his father as the new governor. At the same time, he led his forces to attack and conquer the four commanderies further south in Jing Province: Wuling (武陵; around present-day Changde, Hunan), Changsha, Guiyang (桂陽; around present-day Chenzhou, Hunan) and Lingling (零陵; around present-day Yongzhou, Hunan).

After Liu Qi died in late 209, Sun Quan nominated Liu Bei to replace Liu Qi as the new governor of Jing Province. Liu Bei then made Gong'an County the administrative centre of his territories.

=== Sun Quan "lending" Jing Province to Liu Bei ===
In 210, Liu Bei travelled to Jing (京; present-day Zhenjiang, Jiangsu) to meet Sun Quan and request to govern Nan Commandery. During this time, Zhou Yu secretly wrote to Sun Quan, urging his lord to lure Liu Bei to Wu Commandery (around present-day Suzhou, Jiangsu), distract him with luxuries and women, and keep him separated from his generals Guan Yu and Zhang Fei. Sun Quan, however, rejected Zhou Yu's idea because he considered Cao Cao to be a much greater threat to him than Liu Bei, so it would be better for him to maintain his alliance with Liu Bei.

Lu Su, another of Sun Quan's generals, advised his lord to "lend" Nan Commandery to Liu Bei so as to strengthen the Sun–Liu alliance against Cao Cao. He pointed out that since they had just recently occupied Nan Commandery, they would not be able to defend it well if Cao Cao's forces attacked, so it would be better to "lend" it to Liu Bei and let him serve as a buffer against Cao Cao. Sun Quan agreed with Lu Su and "lent" Nan Commandery to Liu Bei. Sun Quan then decided to have his younger sister, Lady Sun, marry Liu Bei in an effort to further strengthen the Sun-Liu alliance.

Zhou Yu died later that year in Baqiu (巴丘; present-day Yueyang, Hunan) while preparing for a campaign to conquer Yi Province (covering present-day Sichuan and Chongqing), also known as Shu (蜀), from its governor Liu Zhang. Before his death, he wrote to Sun Quan to recommend Lu Su to succeed him as the commander of Sun Quan's forces in Jing Province. Sun Quan approved and put Lu Su in charge of the troops and territories which used to be led and governed by Zhou Yu.

Between 212 and 214, Liu Bei embarked on a campaign to seize control of Yi Province from Liu Zhang. He left his general Guan Yu behind to guard his territories in Jing Province during his absence.

== The conflict ==
Map of present-day Hunan showing key locations of the conflict: Changsha, Lingling, Guiyang, Yiyang, Lukou and Gong'an.

At the time, tensions were rising at the Sun–Liu border in Jing Province as both sides became more suspicious and wary of each other. Around July 215, Sun Quan asked Liu Bei to "return" three commanderies in southern Jing Province – Changsha, Lingling (零陵; around present-day Yongzhou, Hunan) and Guiyang (桂陽; around present-day Chenzhou, Hunan) – since the latter already had a new base in Yi Province. However, Liu Bei refused because he believed that the three commanderies were crucial in his efforts to unify China. Sun Quan decided to seize the three commanderies by force. He stationed himself at Lukou (陸口; at Lushui Lake near present-day Chibi, Hubei) while ordering Lü Meng, Ling Tong and Lü Dai to lead troops to attack the three commanderies, and Lu Su to lead 10,000 troops to Yiyang to block Guan Yu.

=== Lü Meng capturing the three commanderies ===
Lü Meng wrote to the administrators of the three commanderies to ask them to submit to Sun Quan. All of them agreed except Lingling's administrator, Hao Pu (郝普). In the meantime, upon learning of Sun Quan's advances, Liu Bei returned from Yi Province to Gong'an County and ordered Guan Yu to lead troops to stop Lü Meng and take back the three commanderies. After hearing that Guan Yu and his army was heading their way, Sun Quan sent an urgent order to Lü Meng, ordering him to give up on Lingling and lead his troops to Yiyang to assist Lu Su.

When Lü Meng pacified Changsha, he passed by Ling County (酃縣; east of present-day Hengyang, Hunan) and met Deng Xuanzhi (鄧玄之), an old friend of Hao Pu. He planned to use Deng Xuanzhi to trick Hao Pu into surrendering. That night, Lü Meng summoned all his officers and gave them instructions on how to attack Lingling the following morning, without telling them that Sun Quan had given orders for them to give up on Lingling and move to Yiyang. He lied to Deng Xuanzhi that Liu Bei was besieged in Hanzhong by Cao Cao's general Xiahou Yuan and that Guan Yu was occupied in a battle at Nan Commandery. He then asked Deng Xuanzhi to help him persuade Hao Pu to give up on Lingling. Deng Xuanzhi went to see Hao Pu later and conveyed Lü Meng's message. Hao Pu became afraid when he heard that he had been isolated, so he agreed to surrender and asked Deng Xuanzhi to lead him to Lü Meng. When Lü Meng met Hao Pu, he revealed the truth, clapped his hands and laughed. Hao Pu became wrecked with guilt when he learnt that both Liu Bei and Guan Yu were actually free to reinforce Lingling but it was too late. Lü Meng left Sun He (孫河) behind to guard the three commanderies while he headed towards Yiyang per Sun Quan's order.

=== Standoff at Yiyang between Guan Yu and Gan Ning ===
In the meantime, Guan Yu claimed to be leading an army of 30,000. He selected 5,000 of his best troops, led them to the upstream shallows located some 10 li away from Yiyang, and planned to cross the shallows at night. Lu Su held a discussion with his subordinates on how to deal with Guan Yu. At the time, Gan Ning, who had only 300 men under him, told Lu Su: "If you give me another 500 troops, I will go to confront Guan Yu. I assure you that Guan Yu will not dare to cross the waters when he hears of my approach. But if he does, I will capture him." Lu Su then chose 1,000 troops and put them under Gan Ning's command. Gan Ning headed towards Guan Yu's position at night. As Gan Ning expected, Guan Yu did not cross the shallows and instead ordered his men to make camp there. That place was thus named 'Guan Yu's Shallows' (關羽瀨).

=== Negotiations between Lu Su and Guan Yu ===
Lu Su invited Guan Yu to attend a meeting to discuss the dispute. During the negotiations, both sides stationed their soldiers more than 100 paces away from the meeting area, while the officers present at the talks were each armed with nothing more than a sword or blade weapon. This event is hence sometimes referred to as "attending a meeting armed with only a sword" (單刀赴會).

Lu Su told Guan Yu:

"Initially, my lord "lent" these lands to your lord because he suffered defeats and didn't have a base at that time. However, now that he has obtained Yi Province, he doesn't want to "return" the lands. When we ask for only three commanderies, you still refuse..."

Before Lu Su could finish what he was saying, an unnamed person interrupted him: "Whoever has the ability to govern the land shall have control over it. Isn't it so?" Lu Su angrily rebuked that person in a firm and stern tone. Guan Yu drew his sword, stood up and said: "This is a state-level problem. We can't hope to understand it." He left after that.

Wei Zhao's Book of Wu (吳書) provided more details on the meeting. Before the talks started, Lu Su's subordinates feared that Guan Yu would try to harm Lu Su, so they advised Lu Su against attending the meeting. However, Lu Su replied: "It's better for us to settle this dispute in a peaceful manner. Liu Bei may have acted against our lord's interests, but we haven't agreed on who is right and who is wrong. Do you think Guan Yu will dare to do something as rash as killing me at this point in time?"

Lu Su then met Guan Yu, who told him:

"My lord was actively involved in the Battle of Red Cliffs and he didn't rest well during that time. He relied on his own strength to overcome the enemy. How can he not gain even a single piece of land despite his efforts? And now you come to claim the lands from him?"

Lu Su replied:

"No. When I first met your lord at Changban, his men were too few to form even a division and his situation then was very bad as compared to now. My lord considered that your lord didn't have a place to settle down, so he offered your lord protection and shelter. However, your lord wasn't honest with us and he acted on his own. That was why our relations soured. Now, after taking over Yi Province, he still wants to keep Jing Province for himself? This isn't what a reasonable man would do, much less a leader of men! I heard that those who forsake moral principles for the purpose of satisfying their personal greed will meet their doom. My son holds important appointments. He previously lacked a good sense of judgment when he handled issues, but after receiving some moral education, he became more responsible and started striving harder. If what one does is morally right, why should he worry that he won't become successful?"

Guan Yu did not respond to what Lu Su said.

=== Peaceful settlement ===
Although the talks between Lu Su and Guan Yu were inconclusive, the Sun–Liu territorial dispute ultimately ended by the end of August 215 when Liu Bei decided to give in upon learning that his base in Yi Province was potentially under threat. This was because Cao Cao was attacking Hanzhong Commandery, then under the control of the warlord Zhang Lu. As Hanzhong was the "northern gateway" of Yi Province, if Cao Cao succeeded in seizing Hanzhong from Zhang Lu, he would be able to launch attacks on Yi Province from Hanzhong. Liu Bei thus decided that it was better for him to make peace with Sun Quan at the moment, and shift his focus towards countering Cao Cao. Liu Bei and Sun Quan then withdrew their forces after agreeing to divide the territories in southern Jing Province between their respective domains along the Xiang River: Liu Bei would keep Nan, Lingling and Wuling commanderies in the west, while Sun Quan would take Changsha, Jiangxia and Guiyang commanderies in the east.

== Aftermath ==
Although the Sun–Liu territorial dispute of 215 ended in a peace settlement, Sun Quan did not give up his goal of acquiring all of Liu Bei's territories in Jing Province. In the winter of 219–220, when Guan Yu was away at the Battle of Fancheng against Cao Cao's forces in northern Jing Province, Sun Quan ordered Lü Meng to lead a stealth invasion of Liu Bei's territories in Jing Province. Lü Meng and his army succeeded in their mission and conquered all of Liu Bei's territories without Guan Yu knowing. By the time Guan Yu returned from Fancheng, it was already too late. Guan Yu was subsequently captured in an ambush and executed by Sun Quan's forces after refusing to surrender. This set the stage for the Battle of Xiaoting in 221.

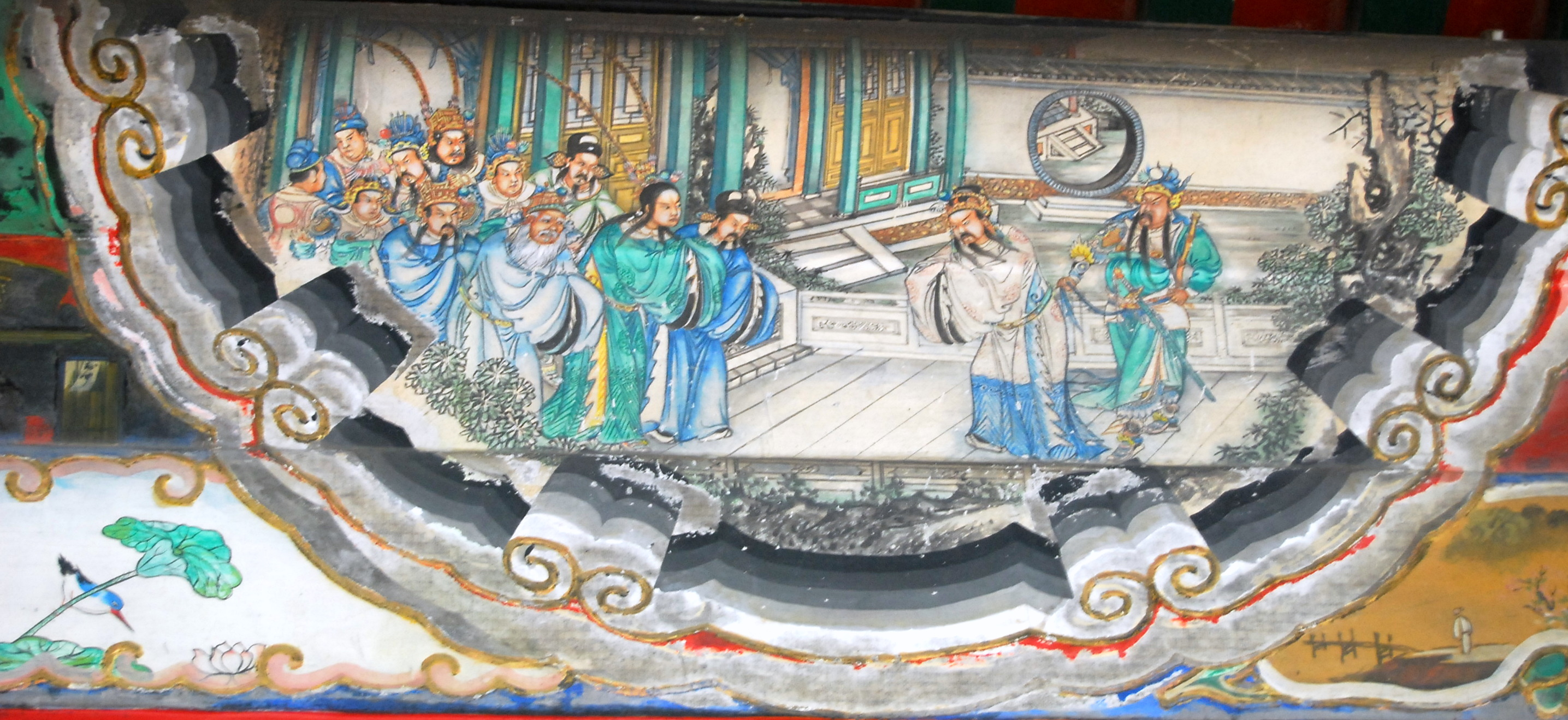
"Guan Yu attending a meeting armed with only a blade", portrait at the Long Corridor of the Summer Palace in Beijing

== In Romance of the Three Kingdoms ==
In Chapter 66 of the 14th-century historical novel Romance of the Three Kingdoms, the meeting between Guan Yu and Lu Su is dramatised into an event known as "Guan Yunchang (Guan Yu) attending a meeting armed with only a blade" (關雲長單刀赴會; 关云长单刀赴会; Guān Yúncháng dān dāo fù huì). In the novel, the meeting is actually a mask for an attempt by Lu Su and his subordinates to force Guan Yu to hand over Liu Bei's territories in Jing Province to Sun Quan's side. Their plan is as follows: Lu Su will pretend to invite Guan Yu to attend a meeting and demand that he "return" the territories. Lü Meng, Gan Ning and the others will lead their men to hide near the meeting area. If Guan Yu refuses to hand over the territories, Lu Su will give a signal for them to immediately come out of hiding and assassinate Guan Yu. Guan Yu knows that it is a trap but he still arms himself with only his Green Dragon Crescent Blade and attends the meeting. After a short exchange with Lu Su over a few drinks, Guan Yu senses the hidden danger so he pretends to be drunk, grabs Lu Su and holds him hostage while carefully retreating back to his boat. He releases Lu Su after boarding his boat and sails back to his base safely.

The plot in this novel gave rise to the xiehouyu "Liu Bei borrows Jingzhou - can never get back once lent" (simplified Chinese: 刘备借荆州——有借无还; traditional Chinese: 劉備借荊州——有借無還).
