= Mi Fang =

Chinese general and official serving Liu Bei (died 223)

- 麋芳 (Note: 麋芳 is often (mis)printed as 糜芳 in copies of the historical novel Romance of the Three Kingdoms in circulation.)

Administrator of Nan Commandery (南郡太守) (under Liu Bei)
- In office 208 – 219
- Monarch: Emperor Xian of Han

Personal details
- Born: Unknown Lianyungang, Jiangsu
- Died: 223
- Relations: Mi Zhu (brother); Lady Mi (sister); Liu Bei (brother-in-law)
- Occupation: Military general, politician
- Courtesy name: Zifang (子方)

Mi Fang (died 223), courtesy name Zifang, was a Chinese military general and politician serving under the warlord Liu Bei in the late Eastern Han dynasty. He was also the younger brother of Mi Zhu, who also served Liu Bei. In 219, Mi Fang surrendered to Liu Bei's ally-turned rival Sun Quan, directly resulting in the loss of Jing Province (covering present-day Hubei and Hunan) and the death of Guan Yu. The Australian Sinologist Rafe de Crespigny notes that Mi Fang had the remarkable record of serving each of the leaders of the Three Kingdoms during his lifetime.

== Early life ==
Mi Fang was from Qu County (朐縣), Donghai Commandery (東海郡), which is present-day Lianyungang, Jiangsu. He was born in an extremely rich merchant family, which had over 10,000 servants and guests. Mi Fang and his elder brother Mi Zhu were said to be proficient in horsemanship and archery. Along with the Chen clan (led by Chen Gui and Chen Deng), the Mi family served under Tao Qian, the Governor of Xu Province (徐州; present-day northern Jiangsu).

== Service under Liu Bei ==
Upon Tao Qian's death, the influential Mi clan strongly advocated the governorship be passed on to Liu Bei, to whom Mi Fang had his sister married. Thereafter, the Mi brothers joined Liu Bei's army to Xuyi and Huaiyin (淮陰; in Guangling, south of Xu Province) to counter-attack the warlord Yuan Shu in 196. Zhang Fei, who was left behind by Liu Bei to guard Xiapi (capital of Xu Province at the time), killed Cao Bao, the chancellor of Xiapi when Tao Qian was still in charge of Xu Province, after an intense quarrel over some trivial things. Cao Bao's death caused unrest in the city, and the locals opened the city gate for Lü Bu, who then seized control of the city, capturing the families of Liu Bei and Mi Fang during the process. Upon hearing the news, Liu Bei's soldiers started to desert. Liu Bei then retreated to Haixi (海西), Donghai Commandery (東海). Faced with enemies on both sides and a lack of supplies, the Mi brothers encouraged Liu Bei and used their personal wealth to support the army. Seeing no other viable option, Liu Bei sought a truce with Lü Bu, who accepted the proposal and returned Liu Bei's family as an act of good faith. In fear of being isolated by Yuan Shu, Lü Bu obstructed further attempts by Yuan Shu to eliminate Liu Bei.

Liu Bei moved his camp to Xiaopei (小沛, in modern Pei County, Jiangsu) where he was financially supported by the Mi brothers to rebuild his army, gathering over 10,000 men. Lü Bu became concerned and attacked Xiaopei. Liu Bei then fled to Xuchang, where warlord Cao Cao had set his base. While Liu Bei served under Cao, Cao Cao enticed Mi Zhu and Mi Fang by offering them governorships of Ying Commandery (嬴郡; northwest of present-day Laiwu, Shandong) and Pengcheng Commandery respectively, but both chose to follow Liu Bei when their brother-in-law left Cao Cao, giving up the high positions for an unknown future.

Later, Liu Bei joined Liu Biao, the Inspector of Jin Province. After the battle of Jiangling, Liu Bei successfully negotiated with the southern and eastern warlord Sun Quan to lend him the Nan Commandery (南郡; present-day Jiangling, Hubei) of Jing Province, and Mi Fang was assigned the post of the Administrator of the commandery. When Liu Bei embarked for Yi Province, Mi Fang was ordered to stay behind with Guan Yu in Jing Province.

== Service under Sun Quan ==
In 219, Guan Yu launched an invasion against Cao Cao, leaving Mi Fang with the defence of the base city in Jiangling, and Shi Ren in Gong'an County. Earlier, Mi Fang had accidentally set some military equipment ablaze, and Guan threatened to dish out harsh punishment should he triumph over Cao Cao. As a result, Mi Fang was afraid of Guan Yu. Mi Fang received letters from Sun Quan, who was also a brother-in-law to Liu Bei, who was also angered by Guan Yu's insolence.

Thus, when Sun Quan launched a surprise attack on Jiangling, Mi Fang listened to Shi Ren's suggestion and surrendered to Sun Quan. Sandwiched on both sides by enemies, Guan Yu was captured by Lü Meng and executed. Mi Zhu was deeply ashamed of his brother's betrayal, and soon died of sickness and wrath. Mi Fang was not only blackened by Yang Xi (楊戲) of Shu Han for his betrayal, but had also been derided by Yu Fan of Eastern Wu for the very same reason.

In c.July 223, an Eastern Wu commander named Jin Zong, who was in charge of Qichun (蕲春; northwestern of today Qichun, Hubei), defected to Cao Wei by launching a rebellion. So Sun Quan ordered He Qi to put down the rebellion. Mi Fang then served under He Qi as a commander, along with another two generals named Liu Shao (劉邵, not to be confused with 劉劭) and Xianyu Dan (鮮于丹). They succeeded in their mission, capturing Jin Zong alive and retaking Qichun. That was the last historical record of Mi Fang, after which he was not mentioned again.

Like Shi Ren, while Mi Fang's death year or date was not recorded in history, he was mentioned in Yang Xi's Ji Han Fuchen Zan (季汉辅臣赞), suggesting that he died before 241 (the year the work was published).

== Anecdotes ==
Once, Mi Fang's boat met with that of Yu Fan in a narrow waterway, the servants on Mi Fang's boat demanded Yu Fan to move out of the way by shouting: "Get out of the way for our general's boat." Yu Fan shouted back angrily in response: "How can one serve the lord when he had lost his loyalty? And how can one be called a general when he caused his [former] master to lose two cities?" Mi Fang was very ashamed and let Yu Fan's boat to pass instead. Another incident also involved Yu Fan when he had to pass through Mi Fang's camp. The officers at Mi Fang's camp did not open the gates, and Yu Fan angrily shouted: "How can one do this when what is supposed to be open is closed, but what is supposed to be closed is open instead?" Mi Fang was even more ashamed than he was in the waterway. Despite the ridicule, Sun Quan still treated Mi Fang with trust and dignity.

== In Romance of the Three Kingdoms ==
In the 14th-century historical novel Romance of the Three Kingdoms, both Mi Fang and Shi Ren (erroneously referred to as "Fu Shiren" in the novel) served in the Eastern Wu military after they surrendered to Sun Quan. In chapter 83, Liu Bei personally led a force against Eastern Wu to avenge Guan Yu. When they discovered that their men were plotting to kill them and surrender to Liu Bei, Mi and Fu assassinated their superior Ma Zhong (馬忠) and surrendered to Liu Bei. However, the unimpressed Liu ordered Guan Xing, son of Guan Yu, to execute the traitors as a sacrifice to Guan Yu.

== See also ==
- Lists of people of the Three Kingdoms
