= Shi Ren =

Early 3rd century Chinese general and official

Shi Ren 士仁
- Born: Unknown; Daxing District, Beijing
- Died: Unknown
- Other names: Junyi (君義)
- Occupation: Official

Shi Ren (fl. 200s–220), courtesy name Junyi, was an official serving under the warlord Liu Bei in the late Eastern Han dynasty.

== Life ==
Shi Ren was from Guangyang Commandery (廣陽郡), which is located southwest of present-day Daxing District, Beijing. He served at Gong'an County in Jing Province as a subordinate of the general Guan Yu, who was appointed by the warlord Liu Bei to guard Jing Province. Following a dispute with Guan Yu, Shi Ren and Mi Fang defected to the warlord Sun Quan when Guan Yu was away at the Battle of Fancheng. Shi Ren and Mi Fang allowed Sun Quan's forces to overrun Jing Province, leading to Guan Yu's defeat and death.

Like Mi Fang, while Shi Ren's death year or date was not recorded in history, he was mentioned in Yang Xi's Ji Han Fuchen Zan (季汉辅臣赞), suggesting that he died before 241 (the year the work was published).

== In Romance of the Three Kingdoms ==
In the 14th-century historical novel Romance of the Three Kingdoms, Shi Ren is referred to Fu Shiren (傅士仁). Despite this misspelling, his role is relatively consistent with history. In the novel, before the Battle of Fancheng, Guan Yu appoints Mi Fang and Fu Shiren as the commanders of the vanguard force, but that night they carelessly allow a fire to break out in the camp. Guan Yu wants to execute them for their negligence, but spares them after Fei Shi pleads on their behalf. He then orders them to be flogged and reassigned to guard Nan Commandery and Gong'an County respectively while he is away at Fancheng.

During the invasion of Jing Province, Lü Meng sends Yu Fan, a childhood friend of Fu Shiren, to persuade Fu Shiren to surrender. Fu Shiren agrees to surrender after reading a letter from Yu Fan. After that, Lü Meng sends Fu Shiren to convince Mi Fang to surrender as well. Although Mi Fang is initially reluctant to do so, he defects to the enemy as well after he hears that a threat from Guan Yu to execute him if he fails to deliver supplies to the frontline in time.

Fu Shiren and Mi Fang appear in the novel again before the Battle of Yiling. They overhear a plot to kill them, so they assassinate Ma Zhong (馬忠), who captured Guan Yu in an ambush, and bring his head along when attempting to return to Liu Bei's side. However, Liu Bei refuses to accept them and orders Guan Xing (Guan Yu's son) to execute them for betraying his father.

== See also ==
- Lists of people of the Three Kingdoms
