= Zhao Lei =

Zhao Lei (Wade–Giles: Chao Lei) may refer to:

- Zhao Lei (Three Kingdoms) (died 220), military officer serving under the warlord Liu Bei
- Zhao Lei (actor) (1928–1996), Chinese actor
- Zhao Lei (singer) (born 1986), Chinese folk singer and musician
