= Xihe, Hubei =

Xihe
- Location in Hubei and China Xihe (China)
- Coordinates: 29°58′23″N 112°03′48″E
- Country: China
- Province: Hubei
- Prefecture-level city: Jingzhou
- County: Gong'an County
- Elevation: 112 ft (34 m)

Population (2010)
  - Total: 390

Xihe (西河村) is a small village in the Gong'an County of Hubei in China. It had a population of 390 and an elevation 34m
