= Battle of Qichun =

Battle between Cao Wei and Wu forces (223)

- Part of the wars of the Three Kingdoms period
| Date | June 223 |
| Location | Qichun, northern bay of the Yangtze River, southwest of Chaohu Lake. |
| Result | Wu victory |

Belligerents
| Cao Wei | Kingdom of Wu |

Commanders and leaders
| Jin Zong | He Qi; Mi Fang |

The Battle of Qichun took place in June 223 between the state of Cao Wei and the kingdom of Wu during the Three Kingdoms period of Chinese history.

After the Battle of Dongkou, a Wu general Jin Zong (晋宗) defected to Wei and moved north of the Yangtze River to the new Wei outpost at Qichun. In response, Sun Quan sent He Qi to supervise Mi Fang (麋芳), Xianyu Dan (鮮于丹), Liu Shao (劉邵) and Hu Zong to attack Qichun by advancing up the river. However, the weather was extremely hot and most of the Wu forces began to withdraw. Jin Zong, in response, let down his guard. This allowed He Qi to penetrate the Wei army and capture the rebel. Thus, the rebellion was quashed. This occurred at the southern slopes of the Dabie Mountains.
