= Battle of Fancheng =

Battle between warlords Liu Bei and Cao Cao (219)

Coordinates: 32.0450°N 112.1360°E

- Part of the wars at the end of the Han dynasty
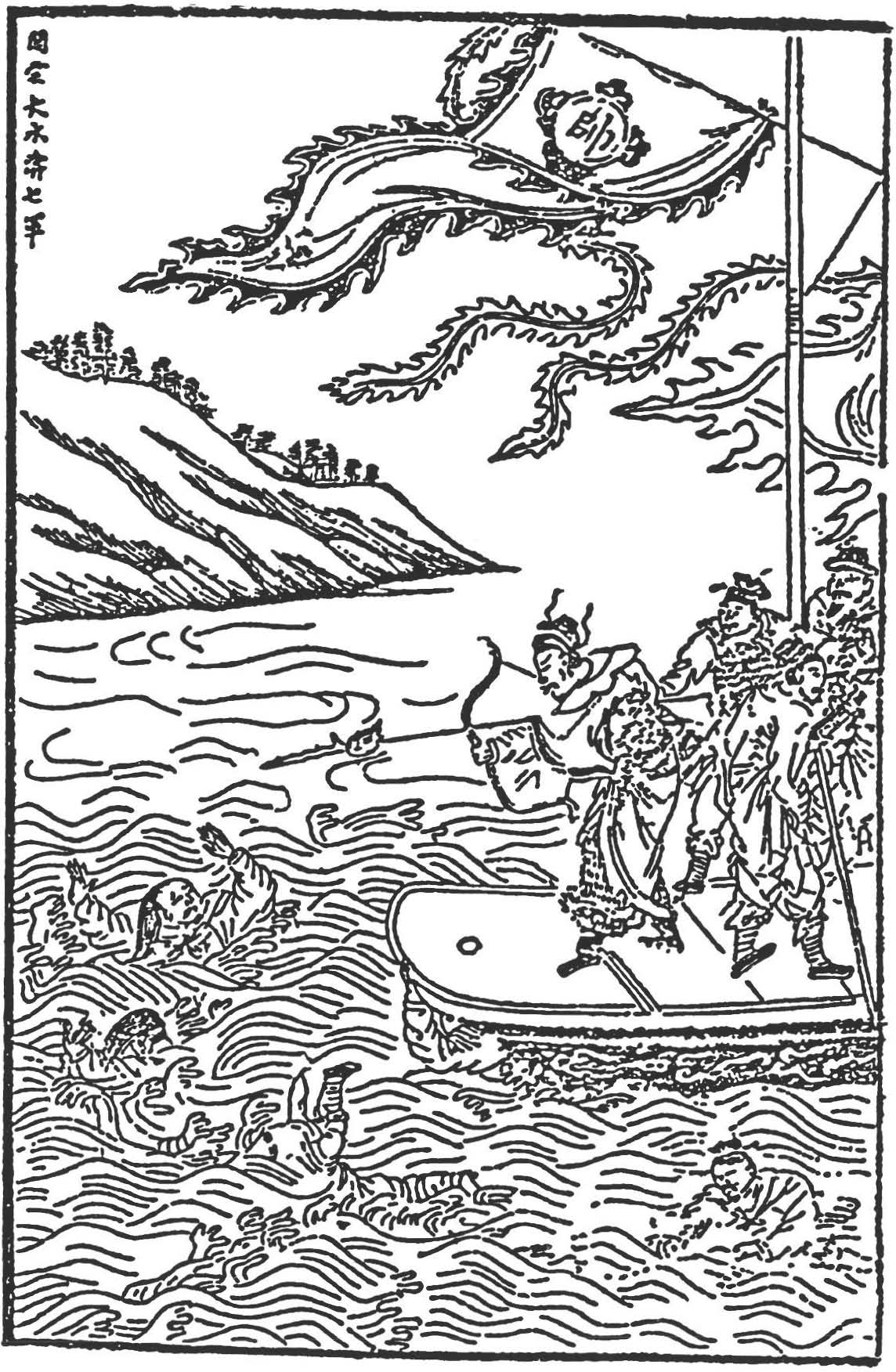
- A scene from the Battle of Fancheng, 17th-century woodblock print
Date	c. August – December 219
Location	Fancheng (present-day Fancheng District, Xiangyang, Hubei, China)
Result	Cao Cao victory

Belligerents
Forces of Cao Cao	Forces of Liu Bei

Commanders and leaders
Cao Cao (overall strategist, reinforcement); Cao Ren; Yu Jin (surrendered); Pang De (executed); Xu Huang; Man Chong	Guan Yu; Guan Ping; Liao Hua; Zhao Lei

Strength
≈100,000 men	70,000+ men (30,000 from surrendered troops + several thousand rebels)

Casualties and losses
40,000+ men	40,000+

Battle of Fancheng
- Traditional Chinese: 樊城之戰
- Simplified Chinese: 樊城之战
Transcriptions
Standard Mandarin
- Hanyu Pinyin: Fánchéng Zhī Zhàn

The Battle of Fancheng or the Battle of Fan Castle was fought between the warlords Liu Bei and Cao Cao in 219 in the late Eastern Han dynasty. It is named after Fancheng in present-day Xiangyang, Hubei, a fortress that played a significant role in the battle.

== Background ==
In 218, imperial physician Ji Ben, along with minor treasurer Geng Ji and minister Wei Huang began an insurrection against Cao Cao in his capital of Xuchang, but were quickly quelled and executed. In November 218, Cao Cao sent general Cao Ren to Wan (宛; in present-day Nanyang, Henan) in preparation to launch a strike against Guan Yu. However, due to Cao Ren's wanton policy of conscription and forced labor, Hou Yin (侯音), a military officer under Cao Cao, started a rebellion in with his deputy Wei Kai (衛開) and several thousand troops from Wan's citizenry, and requested help from Guan Yu. By February 219, Cao Ren had crushed the rebellion and killed Hou Yin and Wei Kai, and massacred the citizenry of Wan.

In the meantime, tired and angered by forced conscription and labour, a peasant revolt also broke out in Luhun-county ( located southeast of present-day Song County, Henan) led by rebel leader Sun Lang (孫狼), who killed the county registrar and defected to Guan Yu, receiving military command to work as raiders for Guan Yu.

After taking Hanzhong Commandery by defeating Cao Cao in the Hanzhong Campaign in May 219, Liu Bei further expanded his territorial gains in June 219 by sending Meng Da and Liu Feng to take Fangling (房陵; present-day Fang County, Hubei) and Shangyong (上庸; north of present-day Zhushan County, Hubei) commanderies. Cao Cao was temporarily forced to be on the defensive after these continuous setbacks.

Realising the imminent attacks of Liu Bei and possibly Sun Quan, Cao Cao planned to launch a preemptive strike on southern Jing Province (covering present-day Hubei and Hunan), the eastern part of Liu Bei's territory defended by Guan Yu. The plan reasoned that Liu Bei could not continue his offensive in the north due to the need to consolidate his new gains, and so an attack into southern Jing Province would not be hindered by Liu Bei's invasion elsewhere. However, the plan was called off because Cao Cao's troops still needed time to recover, regroup, and re-supply from the campaign to suppress the rebellion of Hou Yin and Wei Kai, as well as from earlier setbacks in the struggles for Hanzhong Commandery. The worn-out troops were not ready for another campaign.

== Battle ==
=== Initial stages ===
In July 219, Guan Yu decided to launch an offensive of his own against Cao Cao to build on the conquest of Hanzhong. He ordered Mi Fang and Shi Ren to stay behind to guard Jiangling County and Gong'an County respectively during his absence, while he personally led Liu Bei's forces in southern Jing Province to attack Cao Cao's strongholds in the north.

The campaign's objective was not clearly stated, but Guan Yu led his army along the Han River northward until he laid siege to Fancheng (present-day Fancheng District, Xiangyang, Hubei). From the advance route and the fact that Guan Yu chose to concentrate his main forces on Fancheng, his primary objective was believed to be the conquest of Nanyang Commandery (around present-day Nanyang, Henan). Initially, the cities being attacked were not heavily guarded, as Cao Ren at Fancheng and Lü Chang (呂常) at Xiangyang were both surrounded. Therefore, Cao Cao ordered Yu Jin to aid Cao Ren. After pitching camp on a lower ground about 4 km north to Fancheng, Yu Jin started to prepare a counteroffensive. Eager to prove his loyalty as he was suspected by others, Cao Cao's general Pang De volunteered to lead a detachment to engage Guan Yu, successfully forcing the latter to retreat several times. On one occasion, Pang De fired an arrow that became embedded in Guan Yu's helm. Since then Pang De was widely known and feared among the enemy as "General White Horse" because of the white steed he rode into battle.

Although Guan Yu could not defeat Pang De in battle, he nevertheless held firm control over the water routes around the area and maintained the encirclement of Fancheng.

==== Turning of the tide ====
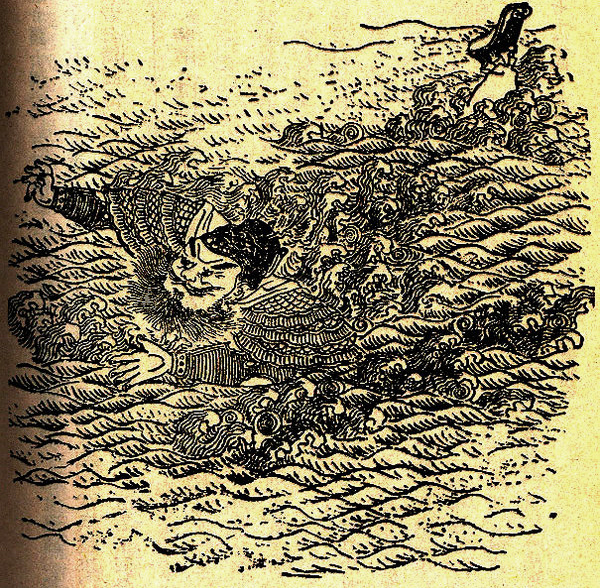
Illustration of Pang De in a scene during the Battle of Fancheng from a Qing dynasty edition of the historical novel Romance of the Three Kingdoms

In August, heavy rains caused the Han River to flood. Forces under the command of Yu Jin and Pang De were completely annihilated by the natural disaster, suffering at least 40,000 fatalities, and another 30,000 were captured by Guan Yu's navy. Pang De and Yu Jin were both captured; Yu Jin begged for his life and surrendered, while Pang De refused to surrender and was executed. Prior, Wen Hui had warned of the potential radical weather changes in the south and feared Guan Yu would use river-floods to his advantage. Cao Ren, with several thousand of his surviving troops, were forced on the defensive by staying behind the safety of the walls. At the time, Xu Huang, who was stationed in Wancheng with his force purely consisting of new recruits, was only able to set up defensive fortifications instead of venturing out to relieve Cao Ren. Meanwhile, Hu Xiu (胡修), the Inspector of Jing Province (the position that had the authority to raise troops from within the entire Jing Province), and Fu Fang (傅方), Cao Cao's Administrator of Nanxiang (Nanxiang was located southeast of present-day Xichuan County, Henan), both defected to Guan Yu. Rebels and bandits in the counties of Liang (梁), Jia (郟), also officially accepted Guan Yu's command. Guan Yu's fame spread across Huaxia.

Due to the immense threat Guan Yu had begun to pose, Cao Cao considered relocating the capital. When Cao Cao asked his advisers for input, Sima Yi and Jiang Ji strongly opposed. They pointed out that the alliance between Liu Bei and Sun Quan was shaky at best due to the feuding over control of Jing Province, and Sun Quan would definitely be unhappy to see Guan Yu's success. They suggested that Cao Cao send an emissary to Sun Quan to recognize the latter's control over Jiangnan should Sun Quan agree to flank Guan Yu's rear.

Initially, Sun Quan sent an emissary to Guan Yu relating his wish for a marriage to be arranged between his own son and Guan's daughter. However, Guan Yu insulted the emissary and rejected the marriage proposal, infuriating Sun Quan. During the campaign in Xiangyang, Guan Yu's military numbers rose and exhausted his food-supply. Because of this, Guan Yu sent out troops to confiscate grains stored in Xiang-Guan (located north of present-day Yongzhou, Hunan), within Sun Quan's territory around 600 km from Xiangyang's location. Sun Quan used this incident, coupled with Guan Yu's rejection of Sun Quan's marriage proposal and insult, to justify severing the alliance with Liu Bei.

At the outbreak of the battle, Liu Bei controlled three commanderies in southern Jing Province: Nan, Lingling, and Wuling.

=== Stalemate ===
Guan Yu further ordered reinforcements from Jiangling and Gong'an to lay siege on Fancheng. With only several thousand troops left, Cao Ren was also plagued by low food supplies, so he considered abandoning Fancheng. Someone also urged him to escape while there was still time, since Guan Yu's forces had not completely surrounded Fancheng yet. Man Chong, the Administrator of Runan, disagreed and said, "The floodwaters may be flowing very fast, but the flood might not last long. Guan Yu had already sent a detachment of troops from his army to station at Jia County (郟縣). There is already much panic and fear among the people living in the lands south of Xu County. Guan Yu doesn't dare to advance further because he's worried that his base (in southern Jing Province) will come under attack. If we abandon Fancheng and leave, we'll end up losing all the territories south of the river. Sir, you should continue to hold up here." Cao Ren agreed with him. Man Chong drowned his horse and pledged to stay with the soldiers in Fancheng to the end. Cao Ren also strengthened Fancheng's defences, increasing the number of his troops to over 10,000 by drafting every available man in the city and going around the city rallying his soldiers.

As Xu Huang was ordered to reinforce Cao Ren, Cao Cao sent two officers, Xu Shang (徐商) and Lü Jian (呂建) to lead additional reinforcements to join Xu Huang, ordering the latter not to attack until all of the reinforcement sent to him had arrived. To wait for further reinforcements, Xu Huang pushed toward Yangling (陽陵), located to the north of Fancheng. As the majority of Cao Cao's force under Xu Huang's command consisted of new recruits, Xu faithfully carried out Cao Cao's order to restrain from attacking. Guan Yu was well aware of Xu Huang's situation, but due to confidence from the earlier victory had ignored Xu Huang's threat and divided his forces, sending another army to Xiangyang, believing that Fancheng would fall into his control. However, Guan Yu was unsuccessful in breaking through the city's defence.

Xu Huang afterwards seized the opportunity opened by Guan Yu dividing his forces, as Guan Yu's vanguard situated around three miles to the north of Fancheng, leaving a gap between it and the main army. Xu Huang pretended to dig a long trench, giving the false impression of cutting off Guan Yu's vanguard, which fell for the trick and retreated. Xu Huang's army therefore took the abandoned stronghold at Yan (偃) and pressed further toward Guan Yu's main army. By this time, 10,000 battle-hardened veterans led by Yin Shu (殷署) and Zhu Gai (朱蓋) had joined Xu Huang, emboldening Xu Huang's army enough to pose a threat to Guan Yu.

=== Strategies ===
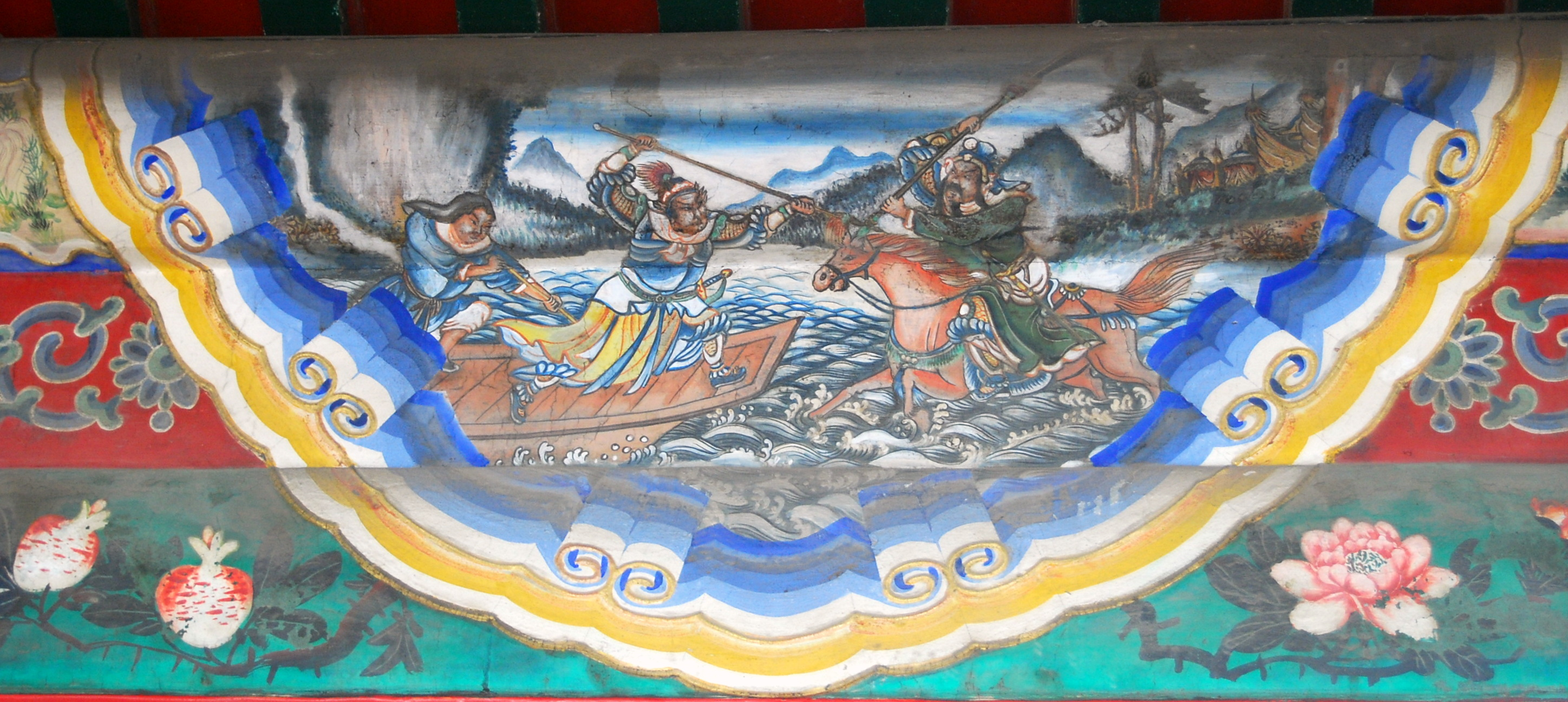
Depiction of Guan Yu attacking soldiers on boats in the Han River

During the stalemate, Cao Cao's emissary returned to Luoyang with a letter from Sun Quan, which informed Cao that Sun planned to attack Guan Yu from the rear in Jing Province. Sun Quan asked Cao Cao to keep this secret so that Guan Yu would not be prepared, and most of Cao Cao's advisers agreed with the plan. However, Dong Zhao objected, pointing out that Liu Bei and Sun Quan are both adversaries of Cao Cao despite the temporary submission of Sun Quan to Cao Cao. For the long term, it would be in the best interest of Cao Cao to weaken both adversaries, instead of letting one adversary become too strong. In the short term, if Guan Yu knew about Sun Quan's attack in his rear, he would certainly withdraw his army to reinforce his home base in Jing Province, and the siege of Fancheng would be lifted. In addition, Fancheng had been under siege for some period of time, and the morale of Cao Cao's forces was low. If this critical information was not passed along to the defenders, some people inside Fancheng might turn their back on Cao Cao, because food supplies were running out. Furthermore, Dong Zhao pointed out that even if Guan Yu knew Sun Quan's intention, he would not retreat swiftly because of his stubbornness and his confidence in the defence of Jiangling and Gong'an counties.

Cao Cao and others were convinced by Dong Zhao and did exactly what he had proposed: copies of Sun Quan's letter was tied to arrows, which were then shot into Fancheng and Guan Yu's camp by Xu Huang's archers. The defenders' morale increased, while Guan Yu was put in a dilemma: he did not want to abandon the attack on Cao Cao, because he believed that Jiangling and Gong'an counties, his rear bases, would not easily fall. Furthermore, Guan Yu had conjectured if the enemy defenders were defeated, Sun Quan would exploit the opportunity to attack Cao Cao's weakened defences instead of attacking the three commanderies under Liu Bei, as Guan Yu anticipated Sun Quan would have more to gain from taking the vast region in the eastern region downstream of the Yangtze River from Cao Cao than in taking Liu Bei's three commanderies. As Guan Yu was hesitating, Cao Cao personally led another reinforcement army to the battlefield and had already reached Mobei (摩陂; southeast of present-day Jia County, Henan).

=== Conclusion ===
The bulk of the forces under Guan Yu's command was camped in Weitou (圍頭), while the remaining camped in Sizhong (四冢). Xu Huang spread the word of an imminent attack on Weitou, but instead, he led his forces to strike Sizhong unexpectedly. Fearing the Sizhong camp would be lost, Guan Yu led 5,000 troops to the rescue, but the attack of Sizhong was only a decoy, as Guan Yu became ambushed by Xu Huang's men when he was on his way for the rescue mission. The defeated Guan Yu withdrew to his main camp, but Xu Huang's force followed closely behind and charged into Guan's main camp, successfully killing the defectors Hu Xiu and Fu Fang. With his camp overrun by the enemy, Guan Yu was forced to concede defeat by lifting the siege of Fancheng and retreating southward.

All of Cao Cao's commanders at the frontline believed that they should take advantage of the situation and pursue Guan Yu, except Zhao Yan (趙儼), who pointed out that they should not pursue Guan Yu because Guan's force should be left alone so that they could fight Sun Quan, thus weakening both Cao Cao's adversaries. Cao Ren agreed with Zhao Yan and did not pursue Guan Yu, and sure enough, when news of Guan Yu's retreat reached Cao Cao, he sent an emissary to Cao Ren, prohibiting him from giving a chase for exactly that reason.

== Aftermath ==
When Guan Yu returned south, he discovered that his rear bases in Jiangling and Gong'an counties had both surrendered to Lü Meng, the commander of Sun Quan's westward army. Lü Meng held hostage the wives and children of Guan Yu's men but treated them and the citizenry of Jing Province with utmost care. Guan Yu's soldiers, hearing that Jing Province had fallen to Sun Quan and that their families were in good hands, lost their will to fight and deserted.

Guan Yu, with only a handful of men left, became isolated in Maicheng (麥城; southeast of present-day Dangyang, Hubei) with Sun Quan's forces on three sides and Cao Cao's in the north. As Guan Yu attempted to escape, he and his surviving followers, including his son Guan Ping and subordinate Zhao Lei (趙累), were captured in an ambush near Zhang District (漳鄉) by Ma Zhong (馬忠), a deputy official of Sun Quan's general Pan Zhang (潘璋). Sun Quan's forces later executed Guan Yu, Guan Ping, and Zhao Lei at Linju (臨沮).

When Cao Cao heard of the victory at Fancheng, he went out to personally congratulate Xu Huang, saying: "The enemy formation was very thick, yet you managed to achieve victory and destroyed their camps and killed so many of their men. I have fought in battles for over 30 years, but I have never heard of anyone who attempted to break a siege by launching a direct attack on the enemy's encirclement. The situation at Fancheng and Xiangyang was much worse than that at Ju and Jimo. (Note: Cao Cao was referring to the military exploits of Tian Dan, a general of the Qi state in the Spring and Autumn period. In 284 BCE, Tian Dan successfully defended the city of Ju (莒; formerly the Ju state, which was annexed by Qi) from an attack by the Yan state. He defeated Yan forces again later in 279 BCE at the siege of Jimo (即墨) by using the "Fire Cattle Columns" strategy.) Your achievements are comparable to those of Sun Wu and Rangju." (Note: "Rangju" refers to Tian Rangju, a general of the Qi state in the Spring and Autumn period who was famous for his military discipline.)

Sun Quan sent Guan Yu's head to Cao Cao following the battle. Cao Cao chose to arrange a noble's funeral for him and had his head properly buried with full honours.

== Order of battle ==
=== Cao Cao forces ===
- General Who Pacifies the South (征南將軍) Cao Ren
  - Administrator of Runan (汝南太守) Man Chong
  - Lü Chang (呂常) (161 - 221)
- (surrendered) General of the Right (右將軍) Yu Jin
  - (executed) General Who Establishes Righteouness (立義將軍) Pang De
- General Who Pacifies Bandits (平寇將軍) Xu Huang
  - Consultant (議郎) Zhao Yan
  - Xu Shang (徐商)
  - Lü Jian (呂建)
  - Yin Shu (殷署)
  - Zhu Gai (朱蓋)

=== Liu Bei forces ===
- General of the Vanguard (前將軍) Guan Yu
  - † Hu Xiu (胡修), the former Inspector of Jing Province (荊州刺史) under Cao Cao
  - † Fu Fang (傅方), the former Administrator of Nanxiang Commandery (南鄉郡太守) under Cao Cao
  - Commandant Zhao Lei (趙累)
  - Guan Ping, Guan Yu's son
  - Liao Hua
  - Sun Lang (孫狼), a peasant rebel leader from Luhun (陸渾)

== In Romance of the Three Kingdoms ==
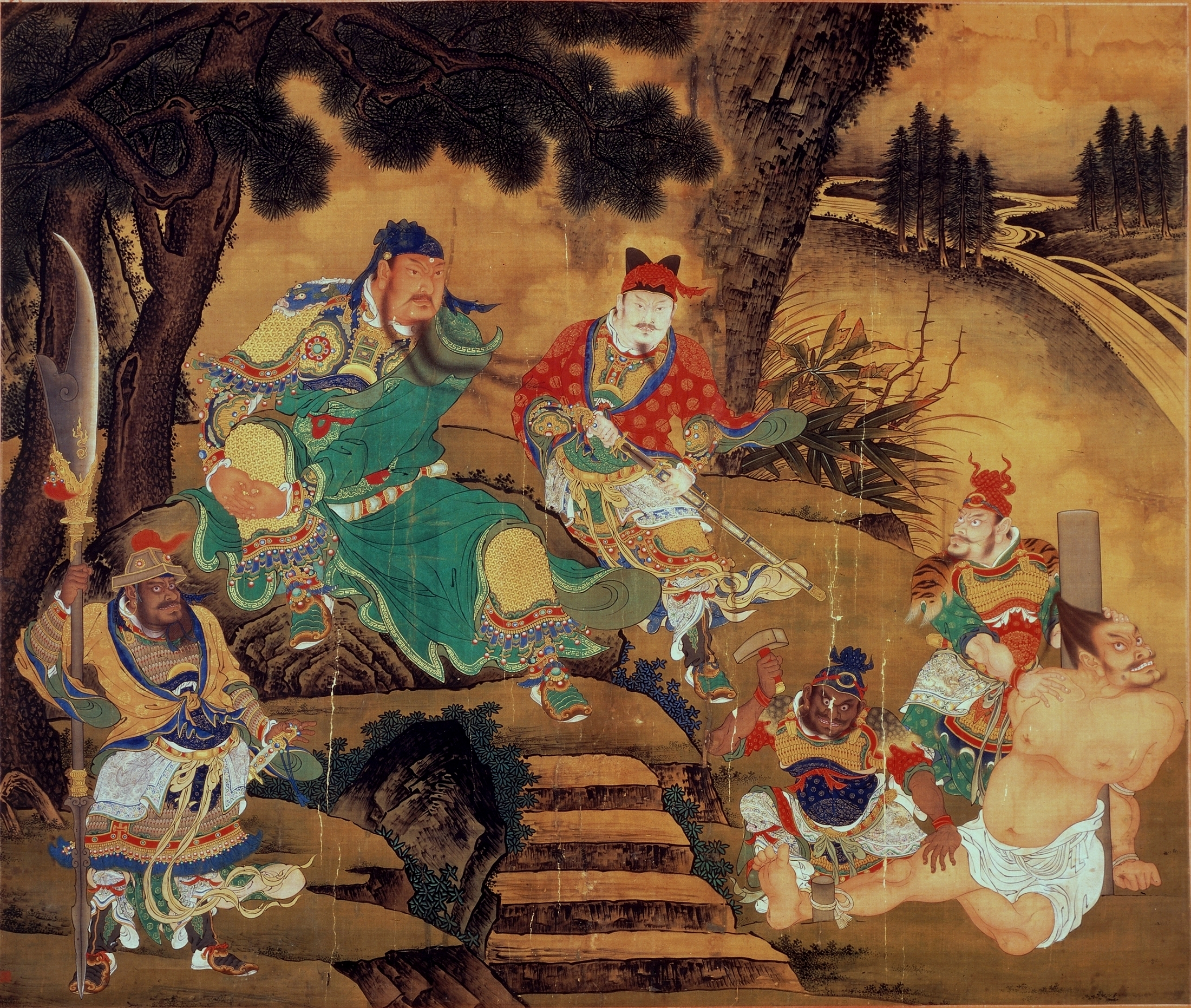
Guan Yu captures Pang De, as depicted in a Ming dynasty painting by Shang Xi, c. 1430.

In the 14th-century historical novel Romance of the Three Kingdoms, the flooding of the Han River was not a natural occurrence, but instead, was planned by Guan Yu. Guan had the rivers dammed and the dam opened when it was full, thus drowning Cao Cao's armies in the lower plains. This event was known as the Drowning of the Seven Armies (水淹七軍). Pang De put up firm resistance and attempted to escape by swimming, but was captured by Guan Yu's subordinate Zhou Cang. In contrast, Yu Jin was depicted pleading for his life and surrendering to Guan Yu.

Several weeks later, Sun Quan, who had secretly allied with Cao Cao, attacked Guan Yu's army at Jiangling. Sun Quan surprised and defeated Guan Yu's forces there, forcing Guan to lift the siege on Fancheng and retreat. Guan Yu and his son, Guan Ping, while fleeing to Yi Province (covering present-day Sichuan and Chongqing), were caught and executed by Sun Quan's soldiers.
