= Gong Ao =

Ruler during Chu-Han contention, China

Gong Ao (Chinese: 共敖; pinyin: Gòng Áo; died 204 BC) was a ruler of the Kingdom of Linjiang of the Eighteen Kingdoms during the Chu–Han Contention, an interregnum between the Qin dynasty and the Han dynasty.

Gong Ao descended from a noble family of the Chu state in the Warring States period. He served King Huai II of the insurgent Chu kingdom that was established in the final years of the Qin dynasty. After the fall of Qin in 206 BC, Xiang Yu divided the former Qin Empire into the Eighteen Kingdoms, and granted Gong Ao the title of "King of Linjiang" (臨江國). Gong Ao's fief was located in Nan Commandery (南郡; covering most of present-day northern Hubei) of the former Qin Empire, with Jiangling (江陵; present-day Jiangling County, Jingzhou, Hubei) as his capital.

In late 206 BC, Gong Ao, along with Wu Rui and Ying Bu, received a secret order from Xiang Yu to kill Emperor Yi of Chu (the former King Huai II) while the emperor was on his journey to Chen County (郴縣; present-day Chenzhou, Hunan). During the Chu–Han Contention, although Gong Ao was on Xiang Yu's side, he did not participate in the conflict.

Gong Ao died in 204 BC and was succeeded by his son Gong Wei.

Chinese royalty
Preceded by None	King of Linjiang; 206 BC – 204 BC	Succeeded by Gong Wei
