= Pang De =

Chinese Han dynasty general (died 219)

- 龐德 / 龐悳
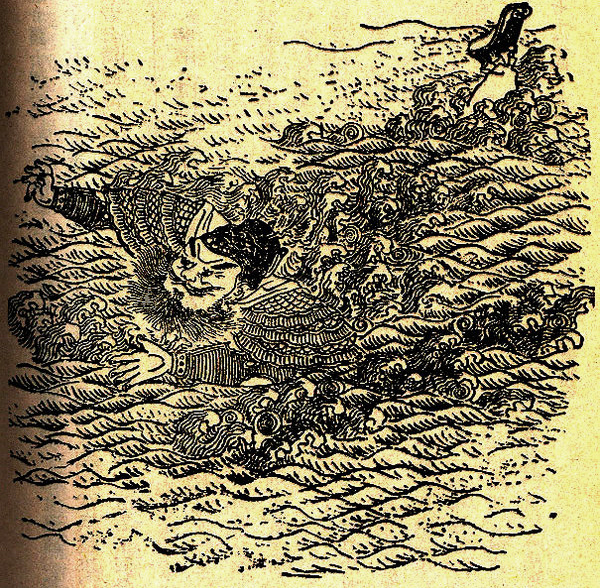
- A Qing dynasty illustration of Pang De at the Battle of Fancheng

General Who Establishes Righteousness (立義將軍)
- In office 216 – 219
- Monarch: Emperor Xian of Han
- Chancellor: Cao Cao

General of the Household (中郎將) (under Ma Teng)
- In office 202–?
- Monarch: Emperor Xian of Han

Assistant Officer (從事)
- In office ?–?
- Monarch: Emperor Ling of Han

Personal details
- Born: Unknown; Longxi County, Gansu
- Died: 219; Xiangyang, Hubei
- Children: Pang Hui; three other sons
- Relatives: Pang Rou (cousin)
- Occupation: Military general
- Courtesy name: Lingming (令明)
- Posthumous name: Marquis Zhuang (壯侯)
- Peerage: Marquis of Guanmen Village (關門亭侯)

Pang De (died 219), courtesy name Lingming, was a Chinese military general who lived during the late Eastern Han dynasty. He started his career under the warlord Ma Teng, who was based in Liang Province. In 211, Ma Teng's son Ma Chao, along with a coalition of warlords from Liang Province, started a rebellion against the Han central government, which was controlled by the warlord Cao Cao. After Cao Cao defeated Ma Chao and the coalition at the Battle of Tong Pass, Ma Chao fled to Hanzhong Commandery and took shelter under the warlord Zhang Lu. Pang De accompanied him to Hanzhong. When Ma Chao defected from Zhang Lu's side in order to join the warlord Liu Bei, Pang De remained in Hanzhong and eventually came to serve Cao Cao after Cao Cao defeated Zhang Lu at the Battle of Yangping and took over Hanzhong. In 219, Pang De fought at the Battle of Fancheng under Cao Ren's command against Liu Bei's forces led by Guan Yu. Pang De was captured in battle and eventually executed by Guan Yu when he refused to surrender.

== Biography ==
Pang De was from Huandao County (狟道縣), Nan'an Commandery (南安郡), Liang Province, which is located east of present-day Longxi County, Gansu. In his youth, he served as an Assistant Officer (從事) in the local commandery office.

=== Early military career ===
During the Chuping era (190–193) in the reign of Emperor Xian, the Liang Province Rebellion broke out. Pang De joined the warlord Ma Teng in suppressing the revolts by the Qiang and Di tribes, and was promoted to Colonel (校尉) for his contributions in battle.

In 202, the warlord Cao Cao, who controlled the Han central government, led his forces to attack rival warlords Yuan Tan and Yuan Shang at the Battle of Liyang. When Yuan Tan ordered his subordinates Guo Yuan and Gao Gan to lead a separate force to attack Hedong Commandery, Cao Cao ordered Zhong Yao to recruit forces from Liang Province to deal with Guo Yuan and Gao Gan. Ma Teng responded to Zhong Yao's call and sent his son Ma Chao and Pang De to assist Zhong Yao in attacking Guo Yuan and Gao Gan at Pingyang County (平陽縣; west of present-day Linfen, Shanxi). Pang De led the vanguard, slew Guo Yuan in the midst of battle and took his head, without knowing that the man he killed was Guo Yuan. After the battle, when Zhong Yao's men searched the battlefield, they found Guo Yuan's headless body. Shortly after, Pang De went to meet Zhong Yao and he threw Guo Yuan's head in front of him. Zhong Yao cried when he recognised Guo Yuan's head because Guo was actually his maternal nephew. Pang De immediately apologised to Zhong Yao, who replied, "Even though Guo Yuan was my nephew, he was an enemy of the state. Why do you apologise?" For his contributions, Pang De was appointed as a General of the Household (中郎將) and made a Marquis of a Chief Village (都亭侯).

Later, Pang De followed Ma Teng to suppress a rebellion by Zhang Baiqi (張白騎) at Yao County (殽縣; present-day Luoning County, Henan). He was famous for his bravery in Ma Teng's army as Pang De recorded always personally charged inside the enemy formation during battles. When Ma Teng was recalled to the imperial capital, Xu (許; present-day Xuchang, Henan), to serve as Minister of the Guards (衛尉), Pang De remained behind in Liang Province with Ma Chao.

=== Battle of Tong Pass & submitting to Cao Cao ===
Around 211, Ma Chao started a rebellion against the Han central government and led a coalition of warlords from Liang Province to attack Cao Cao, leading to the Battle of Tong Pass. Cao Cao defeated Ma Chao and his allies at the battle and caused the coalition to break up. Despite his defeat, Ma Chao, with assistance from the Qiang tribes and the warlord Zhang Lu in Hanzhong Commandery, continued to ravage the lands in Liang Province and even seized control of the provincial governorship at one point. However, he was eventually driven out of Liang Province and forced to take shelter under Zhang Lu in Hanzhong. Pang De accompanied Ma Chao to Hanzhong and became one of Zhang Lu's subordinates.

Around 214, Ma Chao defected to the warlord Liu Bei and aided him in seizing control of Yi Province (covering present-day Sichuan and Chongqing) from its provincial governor, Liu Zhang. Pang De remained in Hanzhong with Zhang Lu. In 215, Cao Cao led his forces to attack Hanzhong and defeated Zhang Lu at the Battle of Yangping. Pang De joined Zhang Lu in surrendering to Cao Cao. As Cao Cao had heard of Pang De's valour, he immediately recruited Pang De as his subordinate and appointed him as General Who Establishes Righteousness (立義將軍). Pang De was also enfeoffed as the Marquis of Guanmen Village (關門亭侯) and given 300 taxable households to form his marquisate.

=== Battle of Fancheng & death ===
In 219, when Hou Yin (侯音) and Wei Kai (衛開) started a rebellion in Wan (宛; present-day Wancheng District, Nanyang, Henan), Cao Cao sent Pang De and Cao Ren to quell the uprising. After accomplishing their mission, they garrisoned at Fan (樊; also called Fancheng, in present-day Fancheng District, Xiangyang, Hubei) to defend Cao Cao's territories in northern Jing Province from advances by Liu Bei's general Guan Yu, who guarded Liu Bei's territories in southern Jing Province. As Ma Chao (Pang De's previous lord) and Pang Rou (龐柔; Pang De's cousin) both served under Liu Bei, many of Cao Cao's other subordinates were suspicious of Pang De's allegiance towards their lord. Pang De often said, "I've received grace from the State and I'm willing to serve the State with my life in the name of righteousness. I'll personally slay Guan Yu. If I don't kill Guan Yu within this year, he'll kill me."

As Pang De arrived in Fan, he battled the rebel forces and managed to slay the rebel leaders under Hou Yin (侯音) and Wei Kai (衛開) who conspired with Guan Yu. As Pang De often rode gray horse during the battle, so Guan Yu's men nicknamed him as "white-horse general" (baima jiangjun 白馬將軍), which he famous for, and feared him. Pang De later engaged Guan Yu in battle and fired an arrow which hit Guan's forehead at one time, nearly killing the Shu general.

Cao Ren ordered Pang De to set up a separate camp ten li north of Fan. At the time, there were heavy rains for more than ten days and the Han River next to Fan burst its banks, with the water level reaching up to five-six zhang. Pang De and his subordinates retreated to the top of a dam. Guan Yu then led his marines to attack Fan and fired arrows from their warships at the dam. Pang De donned his armour, armed himself with a bow and arrows, and returned fire at the enemy, with not a single arrow missing its target. When Dong Heng (董衡) and Dong Chao (董超), two of Pang De's colleagues, wanted to surrender to Guan Yu, Pang De executed them on the spot. The battle dragged on from morning until afternoon, with Guan Yu's attacks increasing in intensity as time passed. By afternoon, Pang De and his men had expended all their arrows but they continued to engage the enemy in close quarters combat with short weapons. Pang De told his subordinate Cheng He (成何), "I heard a good general doesn't fear death, nor does he hope to be spared. A martyr won't violate his principles for the sake of preserving his life. Today is the day I die." The battle raged on as the water level rose higher. By then, many of Pang De's men had surrendered, leaving Pang with only three men. They boarded a small boat and attempted to escape and return to Cao Ren's main camp. However, the boat capsized and Pang De fell into the water. While grabbing on to the boat to stay afloat, he was surrounded and captured by Guan Yu's soldiers.

When brought before Guan Yu, he refused to kneel down and surrender. Guan Yu told Pang De, "Your cousin is serving in Hanzhong, and I want to recruit you as a subordinate. Why don't you surrender now?" Pang De retorted angrily, "Mean fellow, what is surrender? The King of Wei has thousands of troops and his might trembles the Empire. Liu Bei is an inferior man. How can he hope to resist (the King of Wei)? I'd rather be a ghost of the State than be a servant of my enemy." An angered Guan Yu then had Pang De executed.

Cao Cao was deeply grieved when he learnt of Pang De's death and he shed tears. In 220, after Cao Pi – Cao Cao's son and successor – forced Emperor Xian to abdicate the throne to him and established the state of Cao Wei, he granted Pang De the posthumous title "Marquis Zhuang", which literally means "robust marquis". He ordered an emissary to read out the imperial edict at Pang De's tomb. According to the Shu Ji (蜀記; Records of Shu) by Wang Yin (王隱), when the state of Shu Han (founded by Liu Bei) was conquered by the state of Cao Wei in 263, the Wei general Zhong Hui had Pang De's body transported from Shu to Ye (鄴; in present-day Handan, Hebei) in Wei territory. Pang De seemed alive inside the tomb. However, Pei Songzhi, who annotated Pang De's biography in the Sanguozhi, dismissed this account as nonsense. He wrote: "Pang De died in Fancheng. After Cao Pi ascended the throne, he sent an emissary to read out an imperial edict at Pang De's tomb, so Pang's body should not be in Shu. What Wang Yin wrote was nonsense."

== Appraisal ==
Chen Shou, the author of Records of the Three Kingdoms, has likened Pang De defiance towards Guan Yu with Zhou Kao, a minister of Liu Bang, who stands and defying Xiang Yu even when he facing death.

According to Fu Xuan, Jin dynasty historian and politician, there is record that before the battle of Tong Pass, or more known as battle of Weinan, against Cao Cao, Ma Chao and Pang De broke into a stable which contained hundred horses. Pang De were said taking the low quality horse while Ma Chao taken the finest horse, which caused Pang De being laughed at. However, it is said that Pang De horse were the fastest running during the battle of Tong Pass.

According to Longxi County Chronicle and Shanxi tong zhi (chronicle of Shanxi), there are "White Horse General Temple" on the top of Chishan Mountain which commemorate the bravery of two Chinese warrior, the first were Li Guang and the second are Pang De, whose bravery were praised well during the battle of Fancheng against Guan Yu.

== Descendants ==
After Pang De's death, two of his sons were granted marquis titles in recognition of their father's contributions. When Cao Pi ascended the throne, he granted the title of a Secondary Marquis (關內侯) to each of Pang De's four sons and gave them each 100 taxable households as their marquisates. The names of Pang De's sons were not recorded in history, except for one – Pang Hui (龐會).

Pang Hui resembled his father in personality and served as a general in the Cao Wei state. The highest position he reached was Commandant-General of the Capital (中尉將軍). He was also enfeoffed as a marquis. The Shu Ji (蜀記) recorded that he participated in the conquest of Wei's rival state, Shu Han, in 263. After the fall of Shu, he exterminated Guan Yu's family and descendants to avenge his father.

== In popular culture ==
Pang De, as he appears in Dynasty Warriors 5.

=== In Romance of the Three Kingdoms ===
Pang De appears as a character in the 14th-century historical novel Romance of the Three Kingdoms, which romanticises the historical events before and during the Three Kingdoms period.

==== Serving under Ma Chao ====
Pang De made his first appearance in chapter 58 as a trusted general under Ma Teng. At that time, Ma Teng had left Liang Province and travelled to the imperial capital Xu (許; present-day Xuchang, Henan) while Ma Chao remained in the province. One night, Ma Chao had a dream about being attacked by a pack of tigers in a snowy land so he consulted his subordinates about it. Pang De told him that it was not a good omen. Later, Ma Chao received news that his father Ma Teng was lured into a trap in Xu and had been killed by Cao Cao's men. This led to the Battle of Tong Pass, but in the novel, the order of events related to the battle had been reversed and some fictional stories were included. (Note: See Battle of Tong Pass (211)#In fiction for details.)

Later, According to Zhang Chaoju, (Note: Zhang Chaoju is a modern self-taught historian and professor of finance who served as lecturer in University of Queensland and Harvard. He authored a trilogy of books as a biography for the historical Cao Cao, and the biography of the Sima family which were involved in the War of the Eight Princes.) Pang De participated in Cao Cao campaign against Shu, where faced against Shu general named Wei Yan. Pang De managed to overpower Wei Yan in this battle and forced the latter to retreat.

==== Battle of Fancheng ====
Pang De's role in the Battle of Fancheng (mentioned in chapter 70) was largely exaggerated for dramatic effect. Prior to the battle, Pang De volunteered to lead the vanguard of a reinforcement army to relieve Cao Ren's forces, who were besieged in Fan by Guan Yu's army. Cao Cao was delighted and he granted Pang De the post. However, when others advised Cao Cao against granting Pang De command of the vanguard due to Pang's past associations with Ma Chao (who had become one of the Five Tiger Generals under Liu Bei), Pang knelt down in front of Cao and kowtowed until his face was covered in blood. Cao Cao was moved by Pang De's sincerity and he no longer doubted Pang's allegiance towards him, so he appointed Pang as the vanguard. Pang De later ordered a wooden coffin to be built and he told his men to place Guan Yu's body inside if he succeeded in killing Guan, or place his body inside if he died in battle.

Before Pang De left to fight at the Battle of Fancheng, he told his wife to take care of their son, Pang Hui, and said that if he died, his son would avenge him in the future.

Pang De later engaged Guan Ping in a duel and neither of them managed to defeat his opponent after fighting for 30 rounds. The following day, he fought with Guan Yu but neither of them won after duelling for more than 100 rounds. Pang De later duelled with Guan Yu again and he feigned defeat and retreated after about 50 rounds. When Guan Yu pursued him, he suddenly turned around and fired an arrow, which hit Guan in the left arm. Pang De wanted to use the opportunity to attack but Yu Jin (who was his superior) stopped him.

The descriptions of Pang De's final moments at the Battle of Fancheng were generally similar to those mentioned in his historical biography. He attempted to flee towards Cao Ren's main camp on a small boat, but his boat was knocked over by a large raft steered by Guan Yu's subordinate Zhou Cang. Pang De's boat capsized and he fell into the water and was captured by Zhou Cang, who was a good swimmer. Before his death, Pang De refused to kneel before Guan Yu and he firmly rejected surrender, and was thus executed on Guan's order. Guan Yu later pitied Pang De and had the latter properly buried.

=== Modern era depiction ===
Pang De is featured as a playable character in Koei's Dynasty Warriors and Warriors Orochi video game series.

Pang De appears in Total War: Three Kingdoms, serving under Ma Teng's faction.

== See also ==
- Lists of people of the Three Kingdoms

== Bibliography ==
=== Primary & secondary sources ===
- Chen, Shou (3rd century). Records of the Three Kingdoms (Sanguozhi).
- de Crespigny, Rafe (2007). A Biographical Dictionary of Later Han to the Three Kingdoms 23-220 AD. Leiden: Brill. ISBN 9789004156050.
- Luo, Guanzhong (14th century). Romance of the Three Kingdoms (Sanguo Yanyi).
- Pei, Songzhi (5th century). Annotated Records of the Three Kingdoms (Sanguozhi zhu).
- Sima, Guang (1084). Zizhi Tongjian.
