= Zhou Cang =

Fictional character in the 14th-century novel "Romance of the Three Kingdoms"

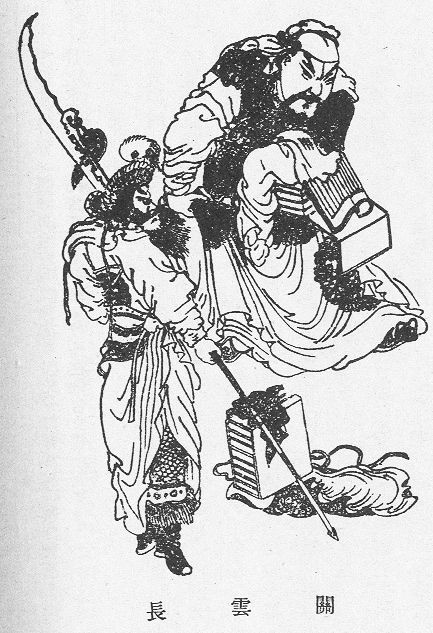
- A Qing dynasty illustration of Zhou Cang (left) and Guan Yu (right)
- Traditional Chinese: 周倉
- Simplified Chinese: 周仓
Transcriptions
Standard Mandarin
- Hanyu Pinyin: Zhōu Cāng

Zhou Cang is a fictional character in the 14-century novel Romance of the Three Kingdoms. His prominence as an aide to Guan Yu led him to be popularly worshipped in Chinese folk religion along with his lord. He is also mentioned in the Shanxi Tongzhi, a Shanxi history compendium that was compiled after the novel was published.

== Story ==
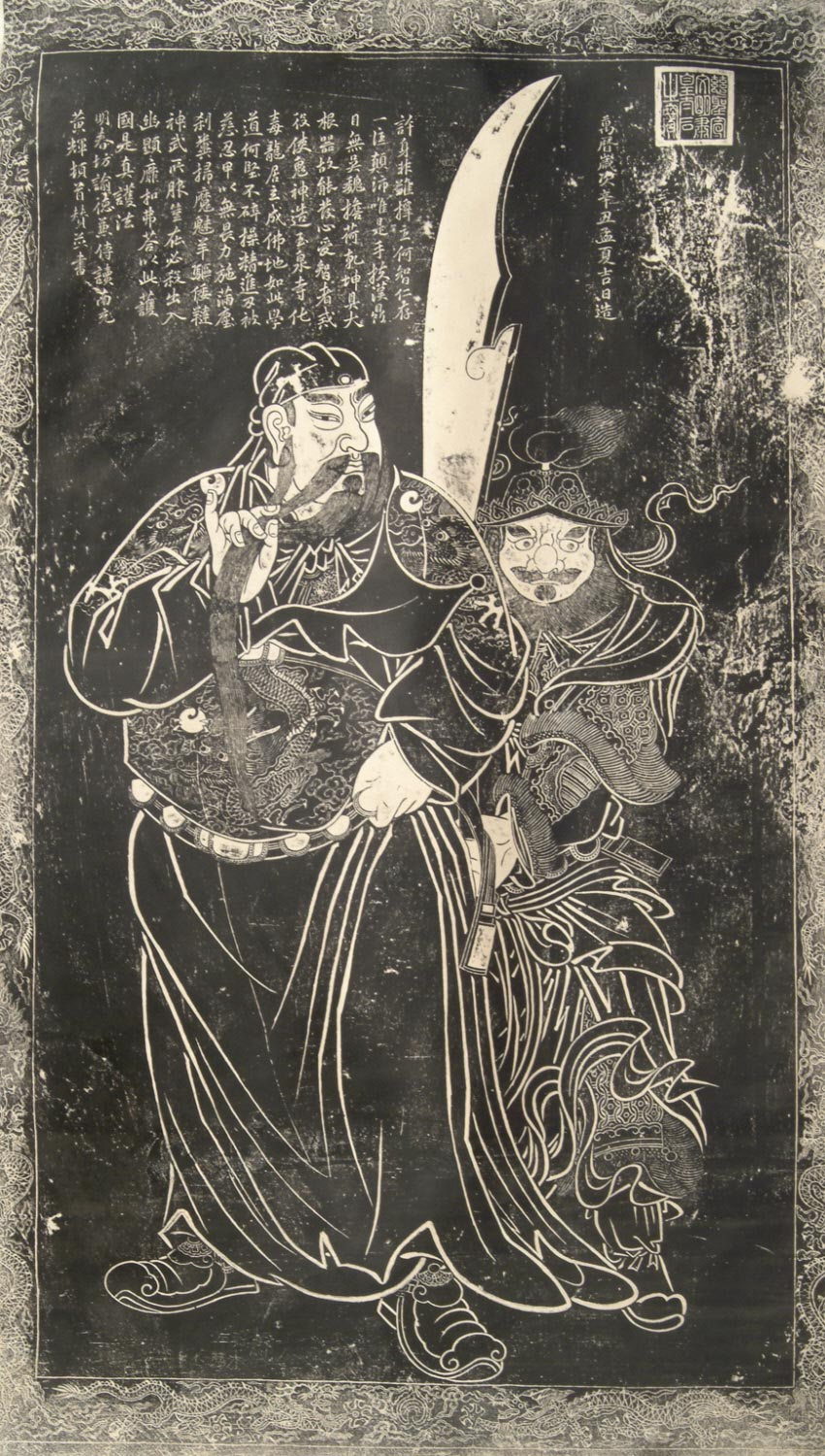
Guan Yu (left) and Zhou Cang (right) carrying Guan Yu's Green Dragon Crescent Blade, as depicted on a rubbing from a 1574 stele in Cishou Temple, located just outside Beijing

A strong warrior with a dark face and a wiry beard, Zhou Cang gets caught up in the Yellow Turban Rebellion towards the end of the Eastern Han dynasty and joins the rebels. It is during this time that he first meets Guan Yu, who impresses him with his courage and sense of honour. However, after the rebellion is crushed by Han imperial forces, Zhou Cang becomes a renegade bandit. He inhabits Mount Woniu with another former Yellow Turban rebel, Pei Yuanshao, and becomes known as a warrior of great strength and skill. After encountering Guan Yu again on a mountain road, he swears an oath of allegiance to the worthy general and is appointed as Guan Yu's weapon bearer. A skilled boatman, his talents are critical in Guan Yu's naval assault during the Battle of Fancheng. At Fancheng, he manages to capture the enemy general Pang De during the flooding of the castle. He commits suicide after learning that Guan Yu and Guan Ping have been captured and executed by Sun Quan's forces.

Some scholars claim his religious depiction deprives from a local village deity General Zhou 周將軍 who was later added to Guan Gong’s deity gruop.

== Legacy ==
Zhou Cang sometimes appears as a door god partnered with Guan Yu in Chinese and Taoist temples. He also sometimes accompanies Guan Yu in his role as a war god, alongside Guan Yu's adopted (historically biological) son Guan Ping. Zhou Cang's face is portrayed as coal black, in contrast to Guan Yu's red and Guan Ping's white.

== See also ==
- Lists of people of the Three Kingdoms
- List of fictional people of the Three Kingdoms
