= Gong Wei =

Ruler of the Kingdom of Linjiang

Gong Wei (Chinese: 共尉; pinyin: Gòng Wèi; died 202 BC) was a ruler of the Kingdom of Linjiang of the Eighteen Kingdoms during the Chu–Han Contention, an interregnum between the Qin dynasty and the Han dynasty.

Gong Wei's father Gong Ao received his fief and the title of "King of Linjiang" (臨江國) from Xiang Yu in 206 BC when Xiang divided the former Qin Empire into the Eighteen Kingdoms after the fall of the Qin dynasty. Gong Wei succeeded his father in 204 BC when the latter died.

During the Chu–Han Contention, Gong Wei remained on Xiang Yu's side but did not participate in the conflict. In 202 BC, Xiang was defeated by Liu Bang in the Battle of Gaixia and committed suicide. Seven months later, Gong Wei's Linjiang kingdom was conquered by Liu Bang's general Jin Xi (靳歙). Gong Wei was captured and escorted to Luoyang and executed.

Chinese royalty
| Preceded by Gong Ao | King of Linjiang; 204 BC – 202 BC | Unknown |
