= Wen Hui =

3rd-century Chinese official and military commander

- 溫恢

Colonel Who Protects the Qiang (護羌校尉)
- In office 223 – ?
- Monarch: Cao Pi

Inspector of Liang Province (涼州刺史)
- In office 223 – ?
- Monarch: Cao Pi

Administrator of Wei Commandery (魏郡太守)
- In office 220 – 223
- Monarch: Cao Pi

Inspector of Yang Province (揚州刺史)
- In office ?–?
- Monarch: Emperor Xian of Han
- Chancellor: Cao Cao

Registrar to the Imperial Chancellor (丞相主簿)
- In office ?–?
- Monarch: Emperor Xian of Han
- Chancellor: Cao Cao

Personal details
- Born: c.178 Qi County, Shanxi
- Died: c.223 (Note: Wen Hui's biography in the Sanguozhi mentioned that he died of illness at the age of 45 (by East Asian age reckoning) en route to assuming the role of Inspector of Liang Province. This appointment was made in 223 after the death of the previous Inspector Zhang Ji.)
- Children: Wen Sheng; Wen Gong
- Parent: Wen Shu (father)
- Occupation: Official
- Courtesy name: Manji (曼基)

Wen Hui (c.178 - c.223), courtesy name Manji, was an official who lived during the late Eastern Han dynasty and Three Kingdoms period of China. He held various positions under the Han government, including county/commandery administrative offices, Registrar to the Imperial Chancellor, and Inspector of Yang Province. He served as the Administrator of Wei Commandery under the state of Cao Wei during the Three Kingdoms period. In 223, he was promoted to Inspector of Liang Province and Colonel Who Protects the Qiang, but died en route to assuming his new offices.

== Descendants ==
Wen Hui's descendants include his grandsons Wen Dan (溫澹), who was a commandery governor during the Western Jin era, and Wen Xian (溫羨; died c.late 307), (Note: The annals of Emperor Huai in Book of Jin recorded that Wen Xian was made situ on 8 Feb 307. Wen Xian's biography in the same work recorded he died soon after receiving the post. Per vol.86 of Zizhi Tongjian, Wang Yan was made situ on 8 January 308 (yihai day of the 11th month of the 1st year of the Yongjia era). Thus, Wen Xian must have died in late 307.) who was Wen Dan's elder brother and an early Jin prime minister. One of Wen Dan's sons was Wen Jiao, who took part in putting down the rebellions led by Wang Dun and Su Jun respectively during the Eastern Jin era.

== See also ==
- Lists of people of the Three Kingdoms
