= Zhao Lei (Three Kingdoms) =

Military officer serving warlord Liu Bei (died 220)

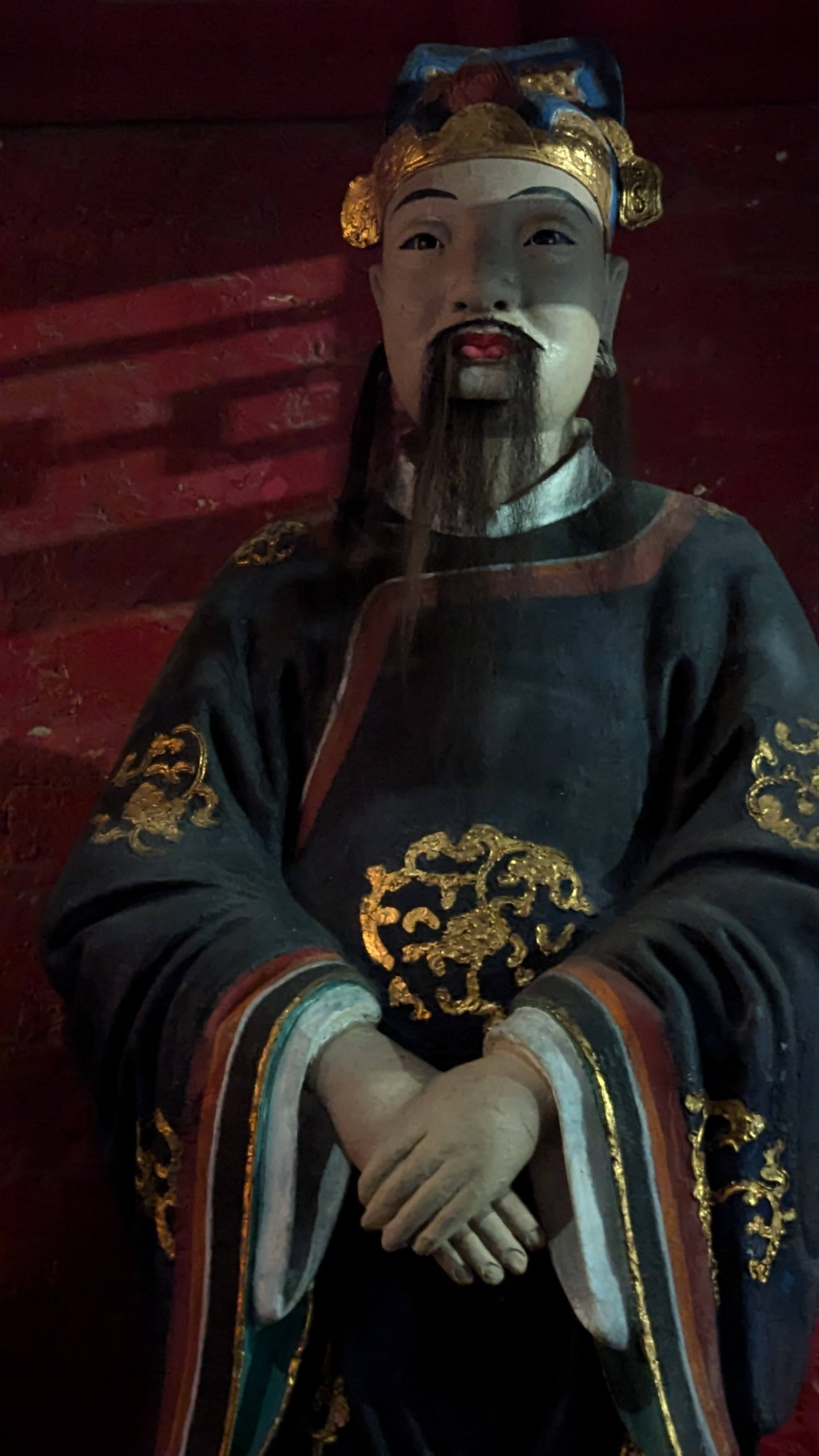
- Statue of Zhao Lei in Wuhou Shrine, Chengdu
- Traditional Chinese: 趙累
- Simplified Chinese: 赵累
Transcriptions
Standard Mandarin
- Hanyu Pinyin: Zhào Lèi

Zhao Lei (fl. 210s–220s) was a military officer serving under the warlord Liu Bei in the late Eastern Han dynasty.

== Life ==
Zhao Lei was a controller (都督) under Guan Yu. In 220, Zhao Lei was captured by Sun Quan's general Ma Zhong after Lü Meng's invasion of Jing Province. His fate is not recorded.

== In fiction ==
In Chapter 73 of Luo Guanzhong's novel Romance of the Three Kingdoms, when Guan Yu was attacking Fancheng, Wang Fu recommended that Zhao Lei be left to defend Jingzhou, but Guan Yu instead appointed Zhao as a supply officer.

Later, when Guan was trapped in Maicheng, Zhao proposed a plan and followed Guan in an attempt to break out of the siege. They were ambushed by Sun Quan's forces and Zhao was killed in action.

== See also ==
- Lists of people of the Three Kingdoms
