= Fancheng, Xiangyang =

Fancheng 樊城区
- District
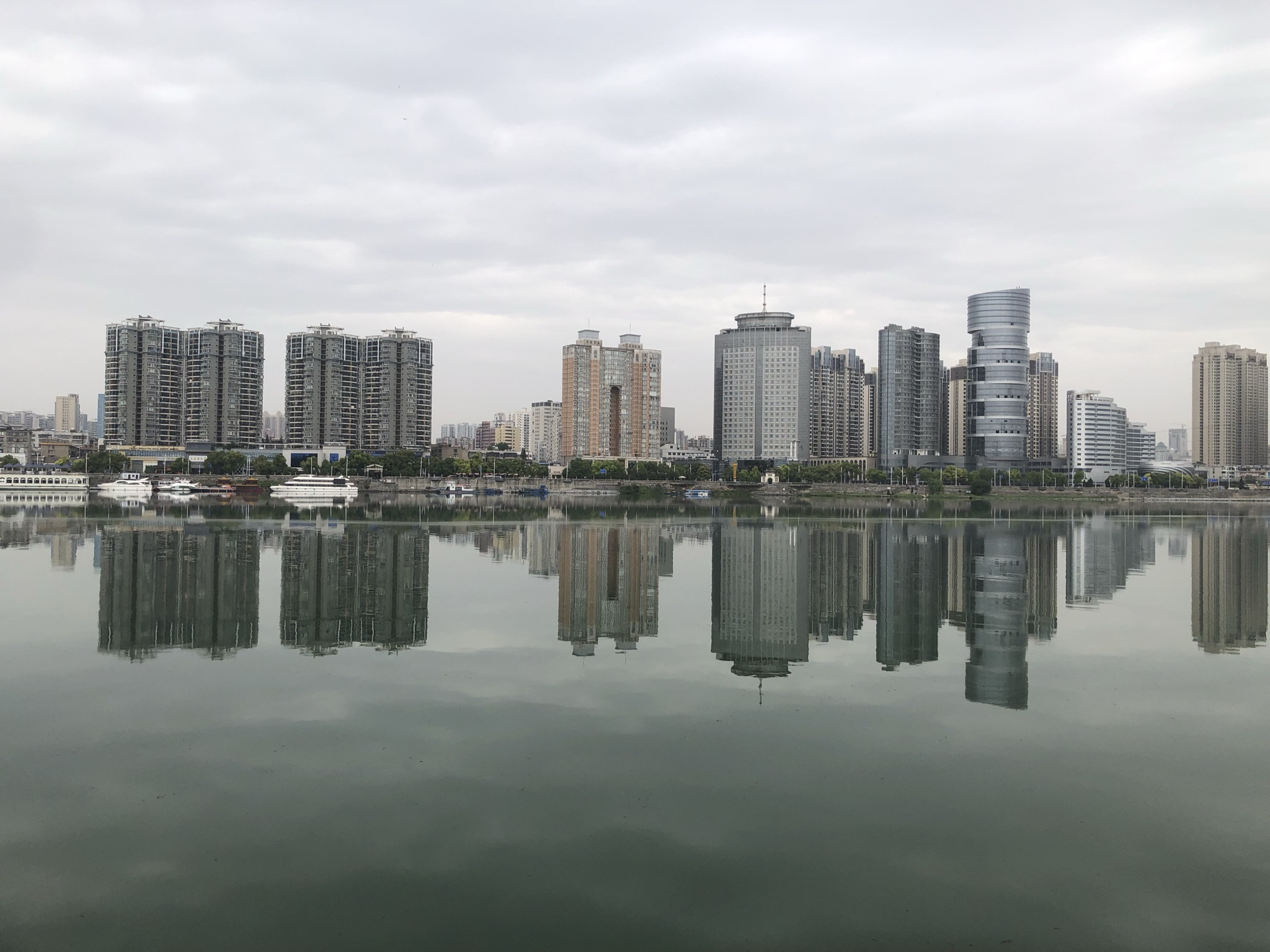
- Skyline of Fancheng

- Location in Hubei
- Coordinates: 32.045°N 112.136°E
- Country: People's Republic of China
- Province: Hubei
- Prefecture-level city: Xiangyang

Area
  - Total: 165 km^{2} (64 sq mi)

Population (2020)
  - Total: 920,794
  - Density: 5,580/km^{2} (14,500/sq mi)
- Time zone: UTC+8 (China Standard)
- Website: www.fc.gov.cn

Fancheng, Xiangyang
- Traditional Chinese: 樊城區
- Simplified Chinese: 樊城区
- Postal: Fancheng
Transcriptions
Standard Mandarin
- Hanyu Pinyin: Fánchéng Qū
- Wade–Giles: Fan-ch‘eng

Fancheng is a district of the city of Xiangyang, Hubei, People's Republic of China.

== History ==
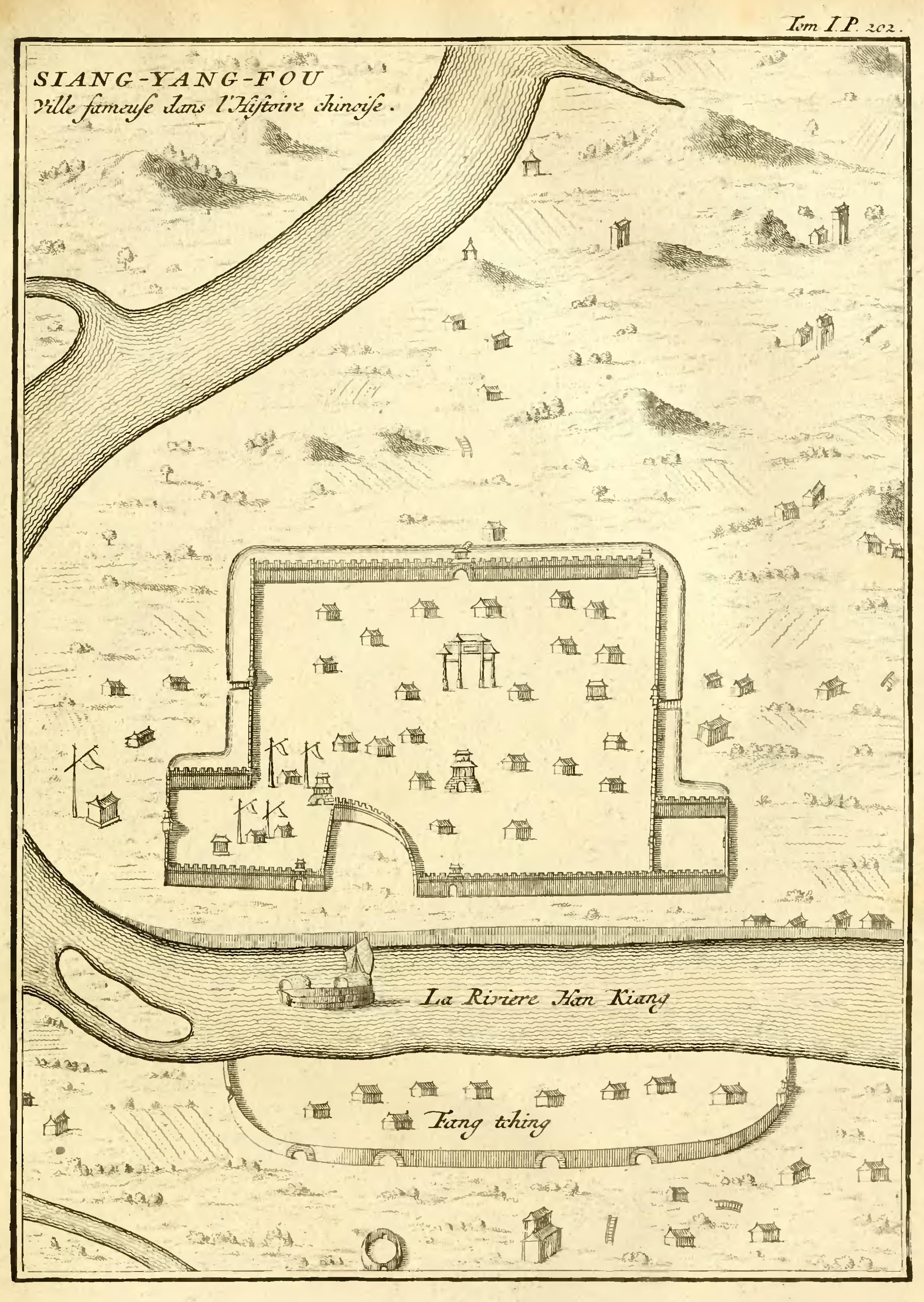
"Fang-tching"" in Du Halde's 1736 Description of China, based on reports from the Jesuit China missions but reversing the positions of Xiangyang and Fancheng.

Fancheng, or Fan City, was an ancient city in Hubei, situated on the northern side of the Han River, opposite Xiangyang on the southern side of the river. Throughout history, the city has served both military and economic purposes and was famous for numerous battles including the Battle of Fancheng during the Three Kingdoms period and the Siege of Xiangyang during the Mongol invasions.

In 1949, Fancheng was merged with Xiangyang to form Xiangfan, a prefecture-level city. Fancheng is now a district of that city, encompassing 482.2 km^{2} (186 sq mi) and having a population of 821,531, according to a 2010 census.

== Administrative divisions ==
Subdistricts:

- Hanjiang Subdistrict (汉江街道), Wangzhai Subdistrict (王寨街道), Zhongyuan Subdistrict (中原街道), Dingzhongmen Subdistrict (定中门街道), Qinghekou Subdistrict (清河口街道), Pingxiangmen Subdistrict (屏襄门街道), Migong Subdistrict (米公街道), Shipu Subdistrict (柿铺街道), Zizhen Subdistrict (紫贞街道), Qilihe Subdistrict (七里河街道), Dongfeng Subdistrict (东风街道)

Towns:

- Niushou (牛首镇), Taipingdian (太平店镇), Tuanshan (团山镇), Mizhuang (米庄镇)

== See also ==
- Fán (surname)
