= Nan Commandery =

Historic commandery of China

Nan Commandery (Chinese: 南郡, "Southern Commandery") was a Chinese commandery that existed from the Warring States period to Tang dynasty. Its territories covered present-day central and western Hubei province, as well as parts of Chongqing. The seat was Jiangling, present-day Jingzhou, Hubei.

== History ==
Nan Commandery was established by Qin in the 29th year of King Zhao (278 BC), after Qin had conquered the Chu capital Ying. After the fall of Qin, Nan Commandery became the fief of Gong Ao, a noble of Chu, and his son Gong Wei, until it was conquered by Emperor Gaozu of Han.

In the Western Han dynasty, the commandery consisted of 18 counties: Jiangling (江陵), Linju (臨沮), Yiling (夷陵), Huarong (華容), Yicheng (宜城), Ying (郢), Zhi (踬), Dangyang (當陽), Zhonglu (中盧), Zhijiang (枝江), Xiangyang (襄陽), Bian (編), Zigui (秭歸), Yidao (夷道), Zhouling (州陵), Ruo (若), Wu (巫) and Gaocheng (高成). The total population in 2 AD was 718,540 individuals, in 125,579 households. By 140 AD, the population had grown to 747,604, in 162,570 households.

During the Three Kingdoms era, three new commanderies – Yidu (宜都), Jianping (建平) and Xiangyang were formed in the region, and multiple new counties were created as well. By the time when Jin dynasty reunited China (280 AD), the territory of Nan had been reduced to 11 counties, namely Jiangling, Bian, Dangyang, Huarong, Ruo, Zhijiang, Jingyang (旌陽), Zhouling, Jianli, Songzi, and Shishou. The recorded population was 55,000 households. Nan Commandery briefly served as the fief of Sima Wei, Prince of Chu, until the outbreak of the War of the Eight Princes in 291. In Liu Song dynasty of Southern and Northern dynasties era, only 6 counties remained in the commandery, while the population had decreased further to 75,087 individuals in 14,544 households by mid-5th century. The commandery was abolished in early Sui dynasty after reunification.

In Sui dynasty and early Tang dynasty, Nan Commandery became an alternative name of Jing Prefecture. The commandery administered 10 counties, and had a population 58,836 households.
