= Gong'an County =

Gong'an County 公安县 Kungan
- County
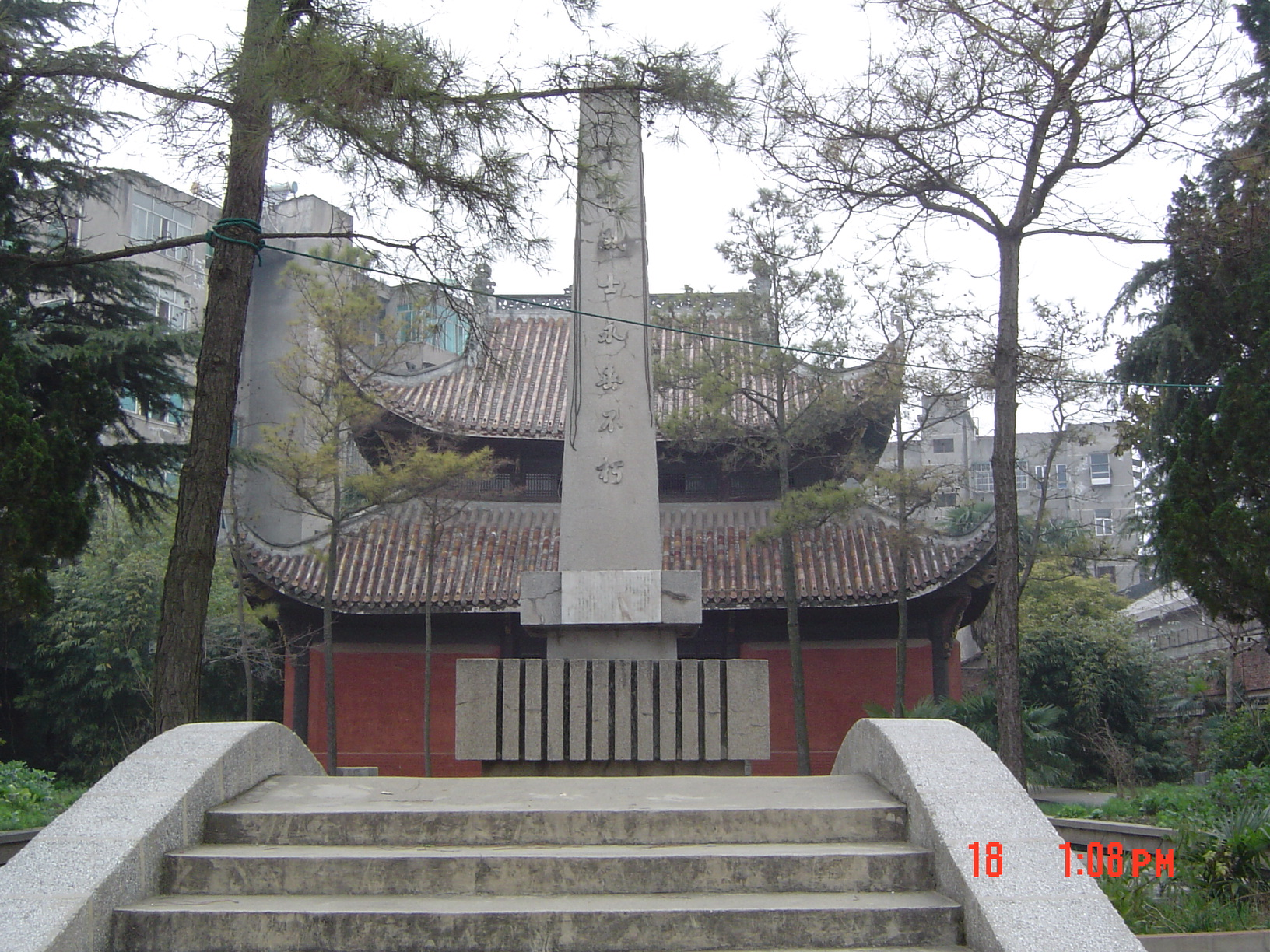
- Monument to the Consolidation of the Red Armies - located at the Nanping Confucian Temple

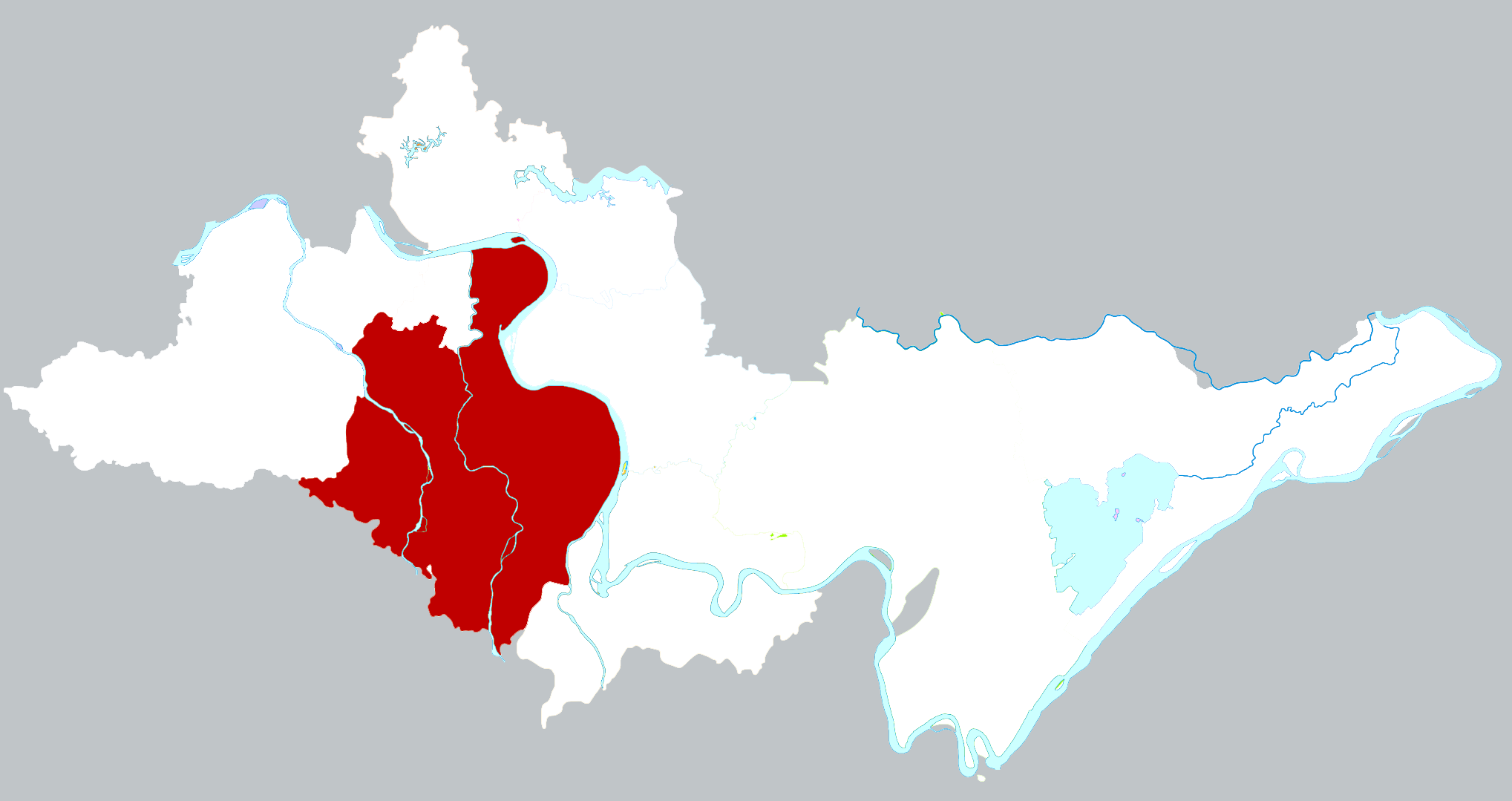
- Location of the county in Jingzhou, Hubei

- Location of the seat in Hubei
- Coordinates: 29°56′N 112°10′E
- Country: People's Republic of China
- Province: Hubei
- Prefecture-level city: Jingzhou

Area
  - Total: 2,258 km^{2} (872 sq mi)

Population (2020)
  - Total: 747,134
  - Density: 330.9/km^{2} (857.0/sq mi)
- Time zone: UTC+8 (China Standard)
- Postal code: 434300
- Area code: 0716
- Website: http://www.gongan.gov.cn/

Gong'an County (simplified Chinese: 公安县; traditional Chinese: 公安縣; pinyin: Gōng'ān Xiàn) is a county in southern Hubei province, People's Republic of China, bordering Hunan to the south. It is under the administration of Jingzhou City.

== History ==
During the Han dynasty and the Three Kingdoms era, Gong'an County was known as Youjiangkou and was a part of Jingzhou Province. It was a camp for Liu Bei's forces during the Sun–Liu territorial dispute.

In April 2009, the county drew nationwide ridicule after media reported that Gong'an officials had ordered civil servants and employees of state-owned companies to buy a total of 23,000 packs / year of a Hubei brand of cigarette. Departments whose employees failed to buy enough or who bought other brands would be fined. The officials were undaunted, saying that the increased revenue from the cigarette tax would buoy the local economy. After several weeks of embarrassment, they relented, posting a short message on their government Web site: "We have decided to remove this edict."

== Administrative divisions ==
The county oversees 14 towns (镇) and two townships (乡) as of 2016. Altogether 59 neighbourhood committees (居委会), 321 village committees (村委会) and 3,337 village groups come under the county's jurisdiction. The new county seat for executive, legislative and judiciary and for the CPC and PSB branches, is Douhudi.

Fourteen towns:

- Buhe (埠河镇) (pop. 100,552)
- Douhudi (斗湖堤镇) (pop. 131,865)
- Yangjiachang (杨家厂镇) (pop. 54,402)
- Mahaokou (麻豪口镇) (pop. 63,032)
- Jiazhuyuan (夹竹园镇) (pop. 56,178)
- Zhakou (闸口镇) (pop. 56,754)
- Ouchi (藕池镇) (pop. 46,623)
- Huangshantou (黄山头镇) (pop. 38,388)
- Zhangzhuangpu (章庄铺镇) (pop. 66,622)
- Shizikou (狮子口镇) (pop. 67,228)
- Banzhudang (斑竹垱镇) (pop. 74,099)
- Mengjiaxi (孟家溪镇) (pop. 49,261)
- Nanping (南平镇) (pop. 56,505)
- Maojiagang (毛家港镇) (pop. 76,440)

Two townships:

- Ganjiachang Township (甘家厂乡) (pop. 42,591)
- Zhangtiansi Township (章田寺乡) (pop. 46,355)

== Climate ==
Climate data for Gong'an, elevation 38 m (125 ft), (1991–2020 normals, extremes 1981–2010)
| Month | Jan | Feb | Mar | Apr | May | Jun | Jul | Aug | Sep | Oct | Nov | Dec | Year |
|---|---|---|---|---|---|---|---|---|---|---|---|---|---|
| Record high °C (°F) | 21.1 (70.0) | 27.3 (81.1) | 31.0 (87.8) | 33.6 (92.5) | 35.7 (96.3) | 36.8 (98.2) | 38.2 (100.8) | 38.3 (100.9) | 37.2 (99.0) | 33.0 (91.4) | 29.1 (84.4) | 22.1 (71.8) | 38.3 (100.9) |
| Mean daily maximum °C (°F) | 8.2 (46.8) | 11.1 (52.0) | 15.7 (60.3) | 21.9 (71.4) | 26.7 (80.1) | 29.8 (85.6) | 32.3 (90.1) | 31.8 (89.2) | 28.0 (82.4) | 22.7 (72.9) | 16.6 (61.9) | 10.8 (51.4) | 21.3 (70.3) |
| Daily mean °C (°F) | 5.0 (41.0) | 7.4 (45.3) | 11.7 (53.1) | 17.5 (63.5) | 22.3 (72.1) | 25.9 (78.6) | 28.5 (83.3) | 27.9 (82.2) | 23.7 (74.7) | 18.4 (65.1) | 12.7 (54.9) | 7.3 (45.1) | 17.4 (63.2) |
| Mean daily minimum °C (°F) | 2.4 (36.3) | 4.6 (40.3) | 8.6 (47.5) | 14.1 (57.4) | 18.9 (66.0) | 22.8 (73.0) | 25.4 (77.7) | 24.9 (76.8) | 20.7 (69.3) | 15.4 (59.7) | 9.8 (49.6) | 4.5 (40.1) | 14.3 (57.8) |
| Record low °C (°F) | −6.8 (19.8) | −4.3 (24.3) | −1.1 (30.0) | 2.3 (36.1) | 9.8 (49.6) | 13.7 (56.7) | 18.7 (65.7) | 16.5 (61.7) | 11.2 (52.2) | 3.2 (37.8) | −1.0 (30.2) | −6.0 (21.2) | −6.8 (19.8) |
| Average precipitation mm (inches) | 41.2 (1.62) | 55.6 (2.19) | 77.1 (3.04) | 136.8 (5.39) | 164.7 (6.48) | 195.1 (7.68) | 210.2 (8.28) | 107.5 (4.23) | 73.9 (2.91) | 76.0 (2.99) | 59.3 (2.33) | 26.8 (1.06) | 1,224.2 (48.2) |
| Average precipitation days (≥ 0.1 mm) | 8.9 | 10.2 | 12.2 | 12.8 | 13.0 | 12.6 | 10.8 | 9.0 | 8.6 | 10.2 | 9.5 | 7.6 | 125.4 |
| Average snowy days | 4.2 | 2.6 | 0.7 | 0 | 0 | 0 | 0 | 0 | 0 | 0 | 0.2 | 1.2 | 8.9 |
| Average relative humidity (%) | 75 | 75 | 76 | 77 | 76 | 81 | 81 | 80 | 78 | 76 | 75 | 72 | 77 |
| Mean monthly sunshine hours | 81.9 | 85.5 | 113.4 | 138.2 | 155.1 | 148.6 | 203.2 | 207.3 | 151.9 | 132.8 | 112.2 | 100.9 | 1,631 |
| Percentage possible sunshine | 25 | 27 | 30 | 36 | 37 | 35 | 48 | 51 | 41 | 38 | 35 | 32 | 36 |
Source: China Meteorological Administration

== Notable persons ==
- Wan Exiang, former chairman of the Revolutionary Committee of the Chinese Kuomintang
