= Red Cliff (film) =

2008 film by John Woo

- American poster for the edited release
- 赤壁
- Directed by: John Woo
- Written by: Kuo Cheng; Sheng Heyu; Chan Khan; John Woo
- Based on: Romance of the Three Kingdoms by Luo Guanzhong
- Produced by: Terence Chang; Han Sanping; John Woo
- Starring: Tony Leung Chiu-wai; Takeshi Kaneshiro; Zhang Fengyi; Chang Chen; Zhao Wei; Hu Jun; Shidō Nakamura; Lin Chi-ling
- Cinematography: Zhang Li; Lü Yue
- Edited by: Yang Hongyu; Angie Lam; Robert A. Ferretti (Part I); David Wu (Part II)
- Music by: Tarō Iwashiro
- Production companies: Beijing Film Studio; China Film Group; Lion Rock Productions; Shanghai Film Group; Emperor Multimedia Group; Avex Entertainment; Showbox; CMC Entertainment
- Distributed by: Chengtian Entertainment (China); Edko Films (Hong Kong); Toho-Towa (Japan); Showbox Mediaplex (South Korea); 20th Century Fox (Taiwan); Magnet Releasing (United States); Summit Entertainment (International)
- Release dates: 10 July 2008 (Part I); 7 January 2009 (Part II)
- Running time: Part I: 146 minutes; Part II: 142 minutes; total: 288 minutes; Abridged version: 148 minutes
- Countries: China; Hong Kong; Japan; South Korea
- Language: Mandarin
- Budget: US$80 million
- Box office: US$250.1 million

Red Cliff, also known as Chibi (赤壁), is a 2008–09 internationally co-produced epic war film produced and directed by John Woo. Based on the Battle of Red Cliffs (208–209 AD) and the events at the end of the Han dynasty and immediately prior to the Three Kingdoms period in Imperial China, it was Woo's first major film since 2003's Paycheck and his first Chinese-language feature film since 1992's Hard Boiled. The film stars Tony Leung Chiu-wai, with a supporting cast of Takeshi Kaneshiro, Zhang Fengyi, Chang Chen, Zhao Wei, Hu Jun, and Lin Chi-ling.

In China and much of Asia, Red Cliff was released in two parts, totaling nearly five hours in length (288 minutes). The first part (146 minutes) premiered in Beijing on 2 July 2008 and the second (142 minutes) was released in China on 7 January 2009. Outside Asia, a cut-down single 148 minute version was released in 2009. However, the full-length two-part version was released on home media in the United Kingdom on 5 October 2009, and in the United States and Canada on 23 March 2010.

The first part grossed over US$127 million internationally, and broke the Chinese box office record previously held by Titanic in mainland China.

== Synopsis ==
John Woo said in an interview with David Stratton that the film is only 50 per cent based on history. Woo decided to write the story to incorporate modern perspectives and his own feelings for a more worldly acceptance. According to Woo, historical accuracy was less important than how the audience felt about the battle.

=== Part I ===
In 208 AD, towards the end of the Eastern Han dynasty, Cao Cao, the warlord who controls the figurehead Emperor Xian, denounces southern warlords Sun Quan and Liu Bei as rebels and leads the imperial army on a campaign to eliminate them. With the emperor's reluctant approval, Cao Cao's army swiftly conquers Jing Province. During the Battle of Changban, Liu Bei's sworn brothers Guan Yu and Zhang Fei protect the retreating civilians by holding off Cao Cao's cavalry. Zhao Yun, one of Liu Bei's warriors, fights bravely to save his lord's family but only succeeds in rescuing Liu Bei's infant son.

Following the battle, Liu Bei's adviser Zhuge Liang goes on a diplomatic mission to Jiangdong to form an alliance between his lord and Sun Quan against Cao Cao. Sun Quan rejects surrender and vows to go to war with Cao Cao after listening to Zhuge Liang and hunting tigers with Zhou Yu, the frontline commander of his forces, and his sister, Lady Sun. Cai Mao and Zhang Yun, naval officers from Jing Province, pledge allegiance to Cao Cao and take command of his massive fleet.

After the hasty formation of the Sun–Liu alliance, Liu Bei and Sun Quan's forces formulate a plan to counter Cao Cao's army, which is rapidly advancing towards their base at Red Cliff via land and water. Lady Sun leads riders to lure Cao Cao's vanguard into the allies' Eight Trigrams Formation. Unfazed by the loss of his small vanguard, Cao Cao makes camp with his main force directly across from Red Cliff. The allies celebrate their victory, and Lady Sun embarks on a spy mission to Cao Cao's camp, maintaining contact with Zhuge Liang by carrier pigeon.

=== Part II ===
Lady Sun successfully infiltrates Cao Cao's camp and transmits intelligence to Zhuge Liang. Cao Cao stages cuju games to boost his troops' morale. Sun Shangxiang befriends Sun Shucai, a soldier highly skilled at cuju. A plague of typhoid fever kill some of Cao Cao's soldiers and he orders the corpses to be floated to the allies' camp to spread the plague to his enemies. The allies' morale is affected when unsuspecting soldiers let the plague in. Disheartened, Liu Bei leaves with his forces while Zhuge Liang remains to assist Sun Quan. Cao Cao is overjoyed that the Sun–Liu alliance has collapsed. Cai Mao and Zhang Yun propose bracing the battleships with iron beams to minimise rocking when sailing on the river and minimize seasickness among the troops.

Sun Quan's forces look on as Liu Bei leaves the alliance. From right to left: Zhou Yu (Tony Leung), Sun Quan (Chang Chen), Lu Su (Hou Yong).

Zhou Yu and Zhuge Liang, planning to eliminate Cai Mao and Zhang Yun, produce 100,000 arrows respectively. They agree that whoever fails to complete his mission will be executed. Zhuge Liang's strategy of letting the enemy shoot 20 boats covered in straw brings in over 100,000 arrows from the enemy and makes Cao Cao doubt the loyalty of Cai Mao and Zhang Yun. Cao Cao sends Jiang Gan to persuade Zhou Yu to surrender, but Zhou Yu tricks Jiang Gan into believing that Cai Mao and Zhang Yun are planning to assassinate Cao Cao. Both Zhuge Liang and Zhou Yu's respective plans complement each other when Cao Cao is convinced, despite having earlier doubts about Jiang Gan's report, that Cai Mao and Zhang Yun are planning to assassinate him by deliberately "donating" arrows to the enemy. Cao Cao realises his folly too late to spare the two officers from execution.

Lady Sun returns from Cao Cao's camp with a map of enemy forces. Zhou Yu and Zhuge Liang plan a fire attack on Cao Cao's navy when favourable winds are predicted. Before the battle, Sun Quan's forces feast on tangyuan to celebrate the Winter Solstice. Zhou Yu's wife, Xiaoqiao, travels in secret to Cao Cao's camp but fails to convince him to give up, and instead distracts him with an elaborate tea ceremony to buy time for her side.

The battle begins when favourable winds blow in the middle of the night. Sun Quan's forces ram smaller boats, setting them aflame and drifing into Cao Cao's larger battleshiops. Liu Bei's forces, whose departure from the alliance was a ruse, attack Cao Cao's forts by land. Cao Cao's entire navy has been destroyed by dawn and Cao Cao's ground army is broken by a testudo formation, though at heavy cost. Cao Cao, besieged in his main camp, holds Zhou Yu at sword point after ambushing him with the help of Cao Hong. Xiahou Jun shows up with Xiaoqiao as a hostage and threatens to kill her if the allies don't surrender. Zhao Yun rescues Xiaoqiao with a surprise attack, while Sun Quan fires an arrow that grazes Cao Cao's head and cuts his topknot loose. Cao Cao's life is spared. Zhou Yu and Zhuge Liang have a final conversation before the latter walks away with the newborn foal Mengmeng.

=== Abridged version ===
For the non-Asian releases, the film was shortened from 288 minutes to 148 minutes and was released in some countries under the title Battle of Red Cliff. An opening narration in English provides the historical background, whereas in the Asian release, a more brief description of the context of the political situation appears in scrolling form ten minutes into the film. Notable cuts include the background and motivations behind Zhuge Liang's plan to obtain 100,000 arrows, including the threat to his life, and the early parts of Lady Sun's friendship with Sun Shucai (but the scene where she mourns his death is not cut). The tiger hunting scene is also cut from the non-Asian releases.

== Cast ==
- Tony Leung as Zhou Yu
- Takeshi Kaneshiro as Zhuge Liang
- Zhang Fengyi as Cao Cao
- Chang Chen as Sun Quan
- Zhao Wei as Lady Sun
- Hu Jun as Zhao Yun
- You Yong as Liu Bei
- Lin Chi-ling as Xiaoqiao
- Nakamura Shidō II as Gan Xing
- Hou Yong as Lu Su
- Tong Dawei as Sun Shucai
- Batdorj-in Baasanjab as Guan Yu
- Zang Jinsheng as Zhang Fei
- Song Jia as Lady Li
- Zhang Shan as Huang Gai
- Wang Hui as Cao Hong
- Xie Gang as Hua Tuo
- Shi Xiaohong as Jiang Gan
- Xu Fengnian as Zhang Liao
- Guo Chao as Yue Jin
- Hu Xiaoguang as Xiahou Jun
- Cui Yugui as Xu Chu
- Jiang Tong as Li Tong
- Ma Jing as Wei Ben
- Yizhen as Cai Mao
- Jia Hongwei as Zhang Yun
- Zhao Chengshun as Xun You
- Wang Zaolai as Cheng Yu
- Wang Ning as Emperor Xian
- Wang Qingxiang as Kong Rong
- Li Hong as Lady Gan
- He Yin as Lady Mi
- Wang Yuzhang as Cheng Pu
- Menghe Wuliji as Guan Ping
- Sun Xinyu as the cowherd boy
- Ma Jingwu as the old fisherman
- Ye Hua as Tiantian
- Chen Changhai as Qin Song
- Zhang Yi as Zhang Zhao
- Wu Qi as Gu Yong
- He Feng as Man Tun
- Li Hongchen as a sick soldier

== Production ==
=== Conception ===
In a 1994 interview with Transpacific magazine, Woo stated that his dream was to direct a version of Romance of the Three Kingdoms, citing his goal of wanting to bring Chinese people together and diminish political infighting.

=== Casting ===
Ken Watanabe was originally selected for the role of Cao Cao. According to a report, some Chinese fans voiced objections over the choice as they felt that it was inappropriate for a Japanese actor to portray an important Chinese historical figure. The report claimed that the protests influenced the decision of director John Woo, who eventually chose Zhang Fengyi for the role.

Chow Yun-fat was originally selected for the role of Zhou Yu and had even earlier been considered for the role of Liu Bei. He pulled out on 13 April 2007, just as shooting began. Chow explained that he received a revised script a week earlier and was not given sufficient time to prepare, but producer Terence Chang disputed this, saying that he could not work with Chow because the film's Hollywood insurer opposed 73 clauses in Chow's contract. After just 2 days, Chow was replaced by Tony Leung, who had previously turned down the role of Zhuge Liang. Although he was exhausted after filming Lust, Caution; Leung offered to help because of his 20-year friendship with Woo.

=== Filming ===
Principal photography commenced in mid-April 2007. Shooting was held at a film studio in Beijing, as well as in Hebei province, where naval warfare was staged at two working reservoirs.

On 9 June 2008, a stuntman was killed in a freak fire accident that also left six others injured.

The digital visual effects in Red Cliff II were produced by Modus FX, The Orphanage, Frantic Films, Red FX and Prime Focus.

Woo said that this film differed from other films based on The Romance of the Three Kingdoms, including story-based dramas and Three Kingdoms: Resurrection of the Dragon, because it "brings out more humane stories tangled with the characters' psychology and life events."

== Release ==
Production is helmed by Lion Rock Entertainment and China Film Group Corporation. Distributors were fast to clinch the deal before shooting even began. Distributors include Chengtian Entertainment (China), CMC Entertainment / 20th Century Fox Taiwan Branch (Taiwan), Mei Ah Entertainment (Hong Kong), Avex Group/Toho-Towa Co. (Japan), Showbox (South Korea), the Los Angeles-based Summit Entertainment (international), and Magnolia Pictures (United States).

=== Home media ===
The full-length two-part version was released on DVD and Blu-ray in the United Kingdom on 5 October 2009, and in the United States and Canada on 23 March 2010. The abridged 148 minute version was also released as a standalone disc on DVD and Blu-ray.

In the United Kingdom, it was 2012's fifth most-watched foreign-language film on television with 280,000 viewers on Channel 4, and the year's most-watched Asian film (above the Indian film My Name is Khan).

== Critical reception ==
Western critics also reacted positively to the film when the two parts were released as one film (148 minute version) in June 2009. On review aggregator website Rotten Tomatoes, the film has an 91% "fresh" rating based on 116 reviews, with an average rating of 7.2/10. The site's consensus states: "Featuring some impressively grand battlefield action, John Woo returns to Asia and returns to form in the process for this lavish and slick historical epic." Metacritic reports a 73 out of 100 rating based on 22 critics, indicating "generally favorable reviews".

=== First part ===
During the first part of the film's Asia release, Variety reported that the film enjoyed a tremendous start to its theatrical run across East Asia since its release date on 10 July 2008. The film scored a record-breaking opening weekend across six Asian territories. Variety also reported that the film received a generally positive critical reception in Hong Kong, China. In South Korea, the opening day of Red Cliff knocked Hancock down to 79,000 admissions Thursday, or an estimated gross of $550,000. The film also drew more than 1.6 million viewers in South Korea – about 130,000 more than the Batman sequel The Dark Knight. At a budget of US$80 million, along with media scrutiny over its lengthy and troubled shoot, including the death of a stunt man and the hospitalisation of its producer, the film was thought by many a big financial gamble, but industry insiders reported that good word-of-mouth and positive reviews appeared to be paying off for the film's strong box-office revenue.

The Associated Press (AP) gave the film a glowing review, writing, "John Woo displays the crucial distinction in the magnificently told Red Cliff, the Hong Kong director's triumphant return to Chinese film after 16 years in Hollywood" and "with Red Cliff, Woo shows he's still a masterful director to be reckoned with."

The Hollywood Reporter also gave the film a positive review, writing, "A formidable prelude to an epic battle with resplendent effects and action spectacles."

Variety also gave the film a favourable review, and describes Red Cliff: "balances character, grit, spectacle and visceral action in a meaty, dramatically satisfying pie that delivers on the hype and will surprise many who felt Woo progressively lost his mojo during his long years stateside." The review also states that the picture may however disappoint those simply looking for a costume retread of his kinetic 80s action films, such as Heroes Shed No Tears and A Better Tomorrow.

The Korea Times writes: "Finally, Asian cinema sees the birth of a movie with the grandeur – in both budget and inspiration – of epic franchises like The Lord of the Rings." "Hefty action sequences are knit together with delightful detail, including poetic animal imagery. While the Asian-ness of movies like Crouching Tiger, Hidden Dragon caters to a Western audience, Red Cliff captures the heart and soul of the Asian philosophy with a more universal appeal." One of South Korea's main English-language newspapers JoongAng Daily raves about the film by stating "the historical China film lived up to its expectations in more ways than one."

The Japan Times gave the film a high praise and states "Red Cliff brings all that and more to the screen – a whopping two and a half hours of frenzied action, feverish passion and elegantly choreographed battle scenes ..." and listed the film at the end of the year as one of the best international (non-Japanese) films of 2008.

The Malaysian national newspaper New Straits Times also gave the film an enthusiastic review, and states: "The first film is breathtaking in its grandeur, with awe-inspiring battle scenes." The review also praised the film's 'impressive' cinematography and noted that "the characters are all well fleshed-out, complete with individual quirks and mannerisms." Vietnamese newspaper Thanh Nien Daily remarked: "Red Cliff's action is epic. Drawing from actual battle tactics from 1,800 years ago, Woo proves that after all these years he still has the ability to make the action fresh and one-of-a-kind by blending grace with violence in a whole new genre. Lovers of Asian cinema can rejoice, John Woo is back."

=== Second part ===
The second half of the film was released in China on 7 January 2009. The Hollywood Reporter writes: "It is director John Woo's level-headed ordering of narrative sequence, his skill in devising kinetic live-action to off-set technical ostentation and his vision of how to turn epic into entertainment that propels "Red Cliff II" to a thundering climax," and "colossal production turns history into legend by splashing out on spectacle and entertainment."

Variety describes the film as "Delivers in spades ... with characters already established, this half is expectedly heavier on action ... though still pack beaucoup human interest prior to the final hour's barnstorming battle," and states the film overall as "in this 280 minute, two-part version, helmer-producer Woo and fellow producer Terence Chang have indeed crafted one of the great Chinese costume epics of all time." The Japan Times gave the second part four-and-a-half stars out of five, stating that the "visually stunning Chinese historical epic ratchets the entertainment factor up to eleven."

== Awards and nominations ==
Part I

Awards
Award	Category	Name	Outcome
3rd Asian Film Awards	Best Picture		Nominated
3rd Asian Film Awards	Best Director	John Woo	Nominated
3rd Asian Film Awards	Best Visual Effects	Craig Hayes	Won
28th Hong Kong Film Awards	Best Picture		Nominated
28th Hong Kong Film Awards	Best Director	John Woo	Nominated
28th Hong Kong Film Awards	Best Actor	Tony Leung Chiu-wai	Nominated
28th Hong Kong Film Awards	Best Supporting Actor	Zhang Fengyi	Nominated
28th Hong Kong Film Awards	Best Supporting Actress	Zhao Wei	Nominated
28th Hong Kong Film Awards	Best New Performer	Lin Chi-ling	Nominated
28th Hong Kong Film Awards	Best Cinematography	Lü Yue, Zhang Li	Nominated
28th Hong Kong Film Awards	Best Film Editing	Angie Lam, Robert A. Ferreti, Yang Hongyu	Nominated
28th Hong Kong Film Awards	Best Art Direction	Timmy Yip	Won
28th Hong Kong Film Awards	Best Costume and Make-up Design	Timmy Yip	Won
28th Hong Kong Film Awards	Best Action Choreography	Corey Yuen	Nominated
28th Hong Kong Film Awards	Best Sound Design	Wu Jiang, Roger Savage	Won
28th Hong Kong Film Awards	Best Visual Effects	Craig Hayes	Won
28th Hong Kong Film Awards	Best Original Score	Tarō Iwashiro	Won
28th Hong Kong Film Awards	Best Original Song	"Mind Battle: Red Cliff"	Nominated
32nd Japan Academy Prize	Best Foreign Language Film		Nominated

Part II

Awards
Award	Category	Name	Outcome
29th Hong Kong Film Awards	Best Picture		Nominated
29th Hong Kong Film Awards	Best Director	John Woo	Nominated
29th Hong Kong Film Awards	Best Supporting Actor	Chang Chen	Nominated
29th Hong Kong Film Awards	Best Supporting Actress	Zhao Wei	Nominated
29th Hong Kong Film Awards	Best Cinematography	Lü Yue, Zhang Li	Nominated
29th Hong Kong Film Awards	Best Film Editing	David Wu, Angie Lam, Yang Hongyu	Nominated
29th Hong Kong Film Awards	Best Art Direction	Timmy Yip	Nominated
29th Hong Kong Film Awards	Best Costume and Make-up Design	Timmy Yip	Nominated
29th Hong Kong Film Awards	Best Action Choreography	Corey Yuen	Nominated
29th Hong Kong Film Awards	Best Sound Design	Wu Jiang, Steve Burgess	Won
29th Hong Kong Film Awards	Best Visual Effects	Craig Hayes	Nominated
29th Hong Kong Film Awards	Best Original Score	Tarō Iwashiro	Nominated
29th Hong Kong Film Awards	Best Original Song	"River of No Return"	Nominated
33rd Japan Academy Prize	Best Foreign Language Film		Nominated
14th Satellite Awards	Best Foreign Language Film		Nominated
14th Satellite Awards	Best Film Editing	Angie Lam, Yang Hongyu, Robert A. Ferretti	Nominated
14th Satellite Awards	Best Art Direction and Production Design	Timmy Yip, Eddy Wong	Nominated
14th Satellite Awards	Best Costume Design	Timmy Yip	Nominated
14th Satellite Awards	Best Cinematography	Lü Yue, Zhang Li	Nominated
14th Satellite Awards	Best Visual Effects	Craig Hayes	Nominated
14th Satellite Awards	Best Sound (Mixing and Editing)	Roger Savage, Steve Burgess	Won
36th Saturn Awards	Best International Film		Nominated
36th Saturn Awards	Best Music	Taro Iwashiro	Nominated
36th Saturn Awards	Best Costume	Timmy Yip	Nominated
13th LVFCS Awards	Best Foreign Language Film		Won
15th BFCA Critics' Choice Awards	Best Foreign Language Film		Nominated
8th WAFCA Awards	Best Foreign Language Film		Nominated
3rd HFCS Awards	Best Foreign Language Film		Nominated
16th DFWFCA Awards	Best Foreign Language Film		Nominated

== See also ==
- Just Another Pandora's Box, a 2010 Hong Kong film, considered a spoof of Red Cliff
- Three Kingdoms: Resurrection of the Dragon, a 2008 film based on the Three Kingdoms
- List of film and television accidents
- List of historical drama films of Asia
- List of media adaptations of Romance of the Three Kingdoms
- Records of Three Kingdoms, a historical record of the events during the Three Kingdoms period, on which the film is based
- Romance of the Three Kingdoms, one of the Four Great Classical Novels, a romanticised interpretation of the historical events during the Three Kingdoms period
- Battle of Red Cliffs, the historical battle on which the film is based
- History of the Han dynasty, for further information about the time period
