= Lu Su =

Chinese politician, general and diplomat (172–217)

- 魯肅
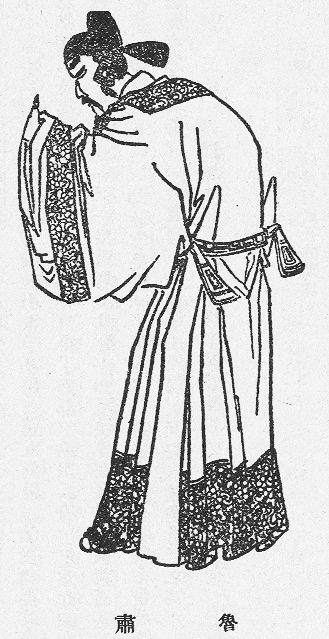
- A Qing dynasty illustration of Lu Su

General Who Crosses the River (橫江將軍)
- In office 214 – 217

Administrator of Hanchang (漢昌太守)
- In office ?–?

Lieutenant-General (偏將軍)
- In office ?–?

Colonel of Vehement Martial Might (奮武校尉)
- In office 210 – ?

Colonel Who Praises the Army (贊軍校尉)
- In office 208 – 210

Personal details
- Born: 172 (Note: Lu Su's biography in the Sanguozhi recorded that he died at the age of 46 (by East Asian age reckoning) in the 22nd year of the Jian'an era in the reign of Emperor Xian of Han. (Note: (肅年四十六，建安二十二年卒。) Sanguozhi vol. 54.) By calculation, Lu Su's birth year should be 172.) Dingyuan County, Anhui
- Died: 217 (aged 45)
- Children: Lu Shu
- Occupation: General, official
- Courtesy name: Zijing (子敬)

Lu Su (172–217), courtesy name Zijing, was a Chinese military general and politician serving under the warlord Sun Quan during the late Eastern Han dynasty. In the year 200, when Sun Quan had just taken over the reins of power, his adviser Zhou Yu recommended Lu Su as a talent to Sun Quan. As one of Sun Quan's most important advisers in the warlord's early career, Lu Su is best known for making some significant contributions. Firstly, in 200 he drafted a long-term strategy for Sun Quan's power bloc to emerge as one of three major contending powers in China – a plan similar to Zhuge Liang's Longzhong Plan, which was proposed about seven years later. Secondly, before the Battle of Red Cliffs in late 208, he was the first person to persuade Sun Quan to ally with Liu Bei against Cao Cao. Thirdly, he succeeded Zhou Yu as the frontline commander of Sun Quan's forces in 210 after Zhou's death and maintained the Sun–Liu alliance. Fourthly, in 215, he represented Sun Quan at the negotiations with Liu Bei's general Guan Yu during the Sun–Liu territorial dispute over Jing Province.

== Early life ==
Lu Su was from Dongcheng County (東城縣), Linhuai Commandery (臨淮郡), which is located southeast of present-day Dingyuan County, Anhui. (Note: (魯肅字子敬，臨淮東城人也。) Sanguozhi vol. 54.) He lost his father not long after he was born, so he lived with his grandmother. Lu Su was very generous with his family's wealth as he used it to help the needy. Wei Zhao's Book of Wu (吳書) described Lu Su as having a stalwart and extraordinary appearance. He had great ambitions since he was young and was very fond of strategy. (Note: (吳書曰：肅體貌魁奇，少有壯節，好為奇計。) Wu Shu annotation in Sanguozhi vol. 54.)

Towards the end of the Eastern Han dynasty, when chaos broke out throughout China due to the Yellow Turban Rebellion and Dong Zhuo's tyranny, Lu Su sold his family's lands and properties and used the money to help the poor. He also spent his time associating with other reputable and talented persons. He was well-loved by his fellow townsfolk. (Note: (生而失父，與祖母居。家富於財，性好施與。爾時天下已亂，肅不治家事，大散財貨，摽賣田地，以賑窮弊結士為務，甚得鄉邑歡心。) Sanguozhi vol. 54.)

The Book of Wu gave another account of Lu Su's life during that chaotic period. Apart from practising sword-fighting, horse-riding and archery, he also hired a group of young men as his retainers, and provided them with clothing and food. They often went to the hills to hunt and practise military arts. The elders of the clan remarked: "We got this wild boy because the Lu clan is in decline!" (Note: (天下將亂，乃學擊劒騎射，招聚少年，給其衣食，往來南山中射獵，陰相部勒，講武習兵。父老咸曰：「魯氏世衰，乃生此狂兒！」) Wu Shu annotation in Sanguozhi vol. 54.)

== Moving to Jiangdong ==
Around 196, when Zhou Yu was nominally serving as the Chief (長) of Juchao County under the warlord Yuan Shu, he wanted to leave Yuan Shu and travel east to the Jiangdong (or Wu) region to join Sun Ce, who had recently conquered some territories in Jiangdong over the past few years. Along the way, Zhou Yu and his militia, numbering a few hundred men, visited Lu Su and requested for supplies. At the time, Lu Su owned two large granaries, each capable of storing 3,000 hu of grain. He pointed at one granary and gave it to Zhou Yu. Realising that Lu Su was no ordinary person, Zhou Yu thanked and befriended him. The third-century historian Chen Shou compared their friendship to that of Gongsun Qiao and Ji Zha (季札) during the Spring and Autumn period. (Note: (周瑜為居巢長，將數百人故過候肅，并求資糧。肅家有兩囷米，各三千斛，肅乃指一囷與周瑜，瑜益知其奇也，遂相親結，定僑、札之分。) Sanguozhi vol. 54.) The Chinese idiom "pointing at a granary and presenting it" (指囷相贈; 指囷相赠; zhǐ qūn xiāng zèng), which means to generously provide aid to someone, originated from this anecdote.

When Yuan Shu heard of Lu Su's fame, he wanted to recruit him to serve as the Chief of Dongcheng County (東城縣; present-day Suining County, Jiangsu). However, Lu Su refused because he saw that Yuan Shu's administration was ill-disciplined and predicted that Yuan Shu would ultimately meet his downfall. He told his followers, "The central government has collapsed. Robbers and bandits are rampant. The areas around the Huai and Si rivers are no longer safe. I heard the lands in Jiangdong are fertile and they have a prosperous population and powerful armed forces. We can take shelter there. Are you willing to accompany me to that paradise and wait until stability is restored in central China?" They unanimously agreed to follow him. (Note: (後雄傑並起，中州擾亂，肅乃命其屬曰：「中國失綱，寇賊橫暴，淮、泗間非遺種之地，吾聞江東沃野萬里，民富兵彊，可以避害，寧肯相隨俱至樂土，以觀時變乎？」其屬皆從命。) Wu Shu annotation in Sanguozhi vol. 54.)

Lu Su led his followers and some civilians southward to Juchao County to join Zhou Yu. He ordered able-bodied young men to guard the rear while the others continued moving forward. The local authorities sent some armed horsemen to stop Lu Su and his followers from leaving. When the riders caught up with them, Lu Su turned back and said, "All of you are capable men, so you should understand what's going on. The Tianxia is now in a state of chaos. While you won't be rewarded for your efforts (even if you manage to stop us), you will also not be punished for failing to stop us. Do you really want to force us to fight?" He then placed a shield upright on the ground and fired an arrow at it. The arrow pierced through the shield. The horsemen realised that they could not stop Lu Su so they gave up and left. Lu Su and his followers then crossed the Yangtze River with Zhou Yu and arrived in Jiangdong, where they met Sun Ce, who also saw great potential in Lu Su. (Note: (乃使細弱在前，彊壯在後，男女三百餘人行。州追騎至，肅等徐行，勒兵持滿，謂之曰：「卿等丈夫，當解大數。今日天下兵亂，有功弗賞，不追無罰，何為相偪乎？」又自植盾，引弓射之，矢皆洞貫。騎旣嘉肅言，且度不能制，乃相率還。肅渡江往見策，策亦雅奇之。) Wu Shu annotation in Sanguozhi vol. 54.)

In Jiangdong, Lu Su lived in Qu'e County (曲阿縣; in present-day Danyang, Jiangsu) for some time before making a short trip back to Dongcheng County later to attend his grandmother's funeral. (Note: (袁術聞其名，就署東城長。肅見術無綱紀，不足與立事，乃攜老弱將輕俠少年百餘人，南到居巢就瑜。瑜之東渡，因與同行，留家曲阿。會祖母亡，還葬東城。) Sanguozhi vol. 54.)

== Nearly leaving Jiangdong ==
Liu Ziyang, a friend of Lu Su, once wrote a letter to him: "Warlords and heroes have emerged all over the Tianxia. I believe the time has come for me to put my talents to good use. I am in a rush to fetch my mother but I will be stopping at Dongcheng County for a while. I heard that recently there is one Zheng Bao (鄭寶) who has rallied thousands of followers in Chaohu and gained control over some very fertile lands. Many people in Lujiang Commandery are planning to join him – including myself. As of now, he is still gathering followers. You should act fast and not miss this opportunity." Lu Su agreed with what Liu Ziyang told him. After his grandmother's funeral, Lu Su returned to Qu'e County and planned to leave Jiangdong and head north to join Zheng Bao. However, after he found out that Zhou Yu had fetched his mother to Wu Commandery (around present-day Suzhou, Jiangsu), he gave up his plan to leave Jiangdong and headed to Wu Commandery to meet Zhou Yu. (Note: (劉子揚與肅友善，遺肅書曰：「方今天下豪傑並起，吾子姿才，尤宜今日。急還迎老母，無事滯於東城。近鄭寶者，今在巢湖，擁衆萬餘，處地肥饒，廬江閒人多依就之，況吾徒乎？觀其形勢，又可博集，時不可失，足下速之。」肅荅然其計。 ... 葬畢還曲阿，欲北行。會瑜已徙肅母到吳，肅具以狀語瑜。) Sanguozhi vol. 54.)

In 200, after Sun Ce was assassinated, his younger brother Sun Quan succeeded him as the warlord controlling the Jiangdong territories. When Lu Su arrived in Wu Commandery, Zhou Yu told him, "In the past, Ma Yuan once told Emperor Guangwu, 'In this era, not only do lords choose their subjects; subjects also choose the lords they wish to serve.' The new lord [Sun Quan] welcomes and respects persons of virtue and talent. He has recruited many extraordinary people. Besides, I also heard a saying that in the past, philosophers predicted that the successor to the Liu clan's empire [the Han dynasty] will rise in the southeast. As you can see, these events are already in motion. This is the time for heroes to rise up and showcase their talents and abilities, and contribute to the construction of a new empire to receive the Mandate of Heaven. Having said this, I don't think you need to take Liu Ziyang's words to heart." Lu Su heeded Zhou Yu's advice (Note: (時孫策已薨，權尚住吳，瑜謂肅曰：「昔馬援荅光武云『當今之世，非但君擇臣，臣亦擇君』。今主人親賢貴士，納奇錄異，且吾聞先哲祕論，承運代劉氏者，必興於東南，推步事勢，當其歷數。終搆帝基，以協天符，是烈士攀龍附鳳馳騖之秋。吾方達此，足下不須以子揚之言介意也。」肅從其言。) Sanguozhi vol. 54.) and remained in Jiangdong. (Note: In Zizhi Tongjian, Sima Guang dated Liu Ye's killing of Zheng Bao to the 4th year of the Jian'an era (c.199), while dating Zhou Yu's persuasion of Lu Su to stay in Jiangdong to the 5th year of said era (c.200). In the record of the incident found in Tongjian, the account was very brief, with no mention of Liu Ziyang. In Zizhi Tongjian Kaoyi, Sima Guang expressed his skepticism that the "Liu Ziyang" mentioned in Lu Su's biography in Sanguozhi was referring to Liu Ye. Sima Guang argued that Lu Su was about to join Zhou Yu, and by extension, Sun Quan. Thus, Sun Quan could also help persuade Lu Su to stay. According to the account in Liu Ye's biography in Sanguozhi, Liu killed Zheng Bao and Zheng Bao's troops subsequently joined Liu Xun. Liu Xun was then defeated by Sun Ce. If "Liu Ziyang" was indeed Liu Ye, then the chronology of events would not make sense.)

The historian Chen Shou, who wrote Lu Su's biography, believed that Zhou Yu recommended Lu Su to Sun Quan because he knew that his lord needed to widely recruit more of such talents to accomplish his goal of building up his power bloc. Therefore, he could not afford to let Lu Su leave. (Note: (瑜因薦肅才宜佐時，當廣求其比，以成功業，不可令去也。) Sanguozhi vol. 54.)

== Drafting a plan for Sun Quan ==
Sun Quan immediately summoned Lu Su to meet him, and was pleased to see Lu Su. When the other guests were leaving after the meeting, Lu Su also took his leave but Sun Quan called him back. They shared a table and had a private conversation over drinks. Sun Quan asked, "The Han dynasty is in decline and there is turmoil everywhere. I have inherited the work of my father and elder brother, and I intend to make achievements like those of Duke Huan of Qi and Duke Wen of Jin. I am honoured to have your noble patronage. What advice do you have for me?" (Note: (權即見肅，與語甚恱之。衆賔罷退，肅亦辭出，乃獨引肅還，合榻對飲。因密議曰：「今漢室傾危，四方雲擾，孤承父兄遺業，思有桓文之功。君旣惠顧，何以佐之？」) Sanguozhi vol. 54.) Lu Su replied:

"In the past, Emperor Gao wanted to serve under Emperor Yi of Chu but Xiang Yu harmed Emperor Yi. The Cao Cao of today is like Xiang Yu in the past. Why do you still desire to emulate Duke Huan and Duke Wen? I foresee that the Han dynasty can't be revived and Cao Cao can't be eliminated so easily. What you can do is to establish a foothold in Jiangdong and observe how the overall situation changes. You shouldn't be disappointed with what you currently have. Why? Because the north isn't stable. Therefore, you should use this opportunity to eliminate Huang Zu and attack Liu Biao, then you will have the Yangtze to your advantage. After that, you can declare yourself emperor and fight for control over the Empire – just like how Emperor Gao did it in the past." (Note: (肅對曰：「昔高帝區區欲尊事義帝而不獲者，以項羽為害也。今之曹操，猶昔項羽，將軍何由得為桓文乎？肅竊料之，漢室不可復興，曹操不可卒除。為將軍計，惟有鼎足江東，以觀天下之釁。規模如此，亦自無嫌。何者？北方誠多務也。因其多務，勦除黃祖，進伐劉表，竟長江所極，據而有之，然後建號帝王以圖天下，此高帝之業也。」) Sanguozhi vol. 54.)

Sun Quan replied, "Now, I am doing my best to support the Han dynasty. What you said can't be achieved." (Note: (權曰：「今盡力一方，兾以輔漢耳，此言非所及也。」) Sanguozhi vol. 54.)

Zhang Zhao, a senior adviser to Sun Quan, felt that Lu Su was not humble enough so he often spoke ill of Lu Su in front of their lord. Pointing out that Lu Su was too young and neglectful, Zhang Zhao advised Sun Quan to refrain from entrusting Lu Su with important responsibilities. However, Sun Quan ignored Zhang Zhao and continued to treat Lu Su respectfully and regard him highly. He gave new clothes and curtains to Lu Su's mother and restored Lu Su's family to their prior status as a wealthy family. (Note: (張昭非肅謙下不足，頗訾毀之，云肅年少麤踈，未可用。權不以介意，益貴重之，賜肅母衣服幃帳，居處雜物，富擬其舊。) Sanguozhi vol. 54.)

== Formation of the Sun–Liu alliance ==
When Liu Biao died in 208, his younger son Liu Cong succeeded him as the Governor of Jing Province (covering present-day Hubei and Hunan). Upon receiving news of Liu Biao's death, Lu Su told Sun Quan,

"Jing Province is our neighbour. Its water routes lead to the north; it is connected to the major rivers; and it has mountainous terrain. It is firm and stable; its lands are fertile; and its population is wealthy and prosperous. Whoever controls that region has the resources for building an empire. Liu Biao has recently died; his two sons are in disharmony; and his subordinates are more concerned about advancing their own interests. Liu Bei has the reputation of an ambitious hero, and he's Cao Cao's rival. When he took shelter under Liu Biao, Liu Biao was jealous of his talent and didn't assign him important responsibilities. If Liu Bei can unite with us in spirit and work together with us, we can win him over and form an alliance with him. If he's unwilling to join us, we should seek alternative ways to accomplish our grand objective. I hereby request you to appoint me as your representative to attend Liu Biao's funeral and offer condolences. At the same time, I'll ask Liu Bei to persuade Liu Biao's followers to join us in resisting Cao Cao. Liu Bei will be most happy to do so. If he agrees to ally with us, we'll be able to pacify the Empire. We must act fast because I fear we may lose the opportunity to Cao Cao." (Note: (劉表死。肅進說曰：「夫荊楚與國鄰接，水流順北，外帶江漢，內阻山陵，有金城之固，沃野萬里，士民殷富，若據而有之，此帝王之資也。今表新亡，二子素不輯睦，軍中諸將，各有彼此。加劉備天下梟雄，與操有隙，寄寓於表，表惡其能而不能用也。若備與彼協心，上下齊同，則宜撫安，與結盟好；如有離違，宜別圖之，以濟大事。肅請得奉命弔表二子，并慰勞其軍中用事者，及說備使撫表衆，同心一意，共治曹操，備必喜而從命。如其克諧，天下可定也。今不速往，恐為操所先。」) Sanguozhi vol. 54.)

Sun Quan then sent Lu Su as his representative to Jing Province. (Note: (權即遣肅行。) Sanguozhi vol. 54.)

When Lu Su reached Xiakou (夏口; present-day Hankou, Hubei), he heard that Cao Cao and his forces were advancing towards Jing Province so he travelled day and night in the hope of reaching Xiangyang (Jing Province's capital) in the shortest time possible. When he arrived at Nan Commandery (南郡; around present-day Jingzhou, Hubei), he received news that Liu Cong had already surrendered to Cao Cao, and that Jing Province was now under Cao Cao's control. At the same time, Liu Bei had been defeated at the Battle of Changban and was trying to cross the Yangtze and head further south. Lu Su met Liu Bei at Changban (長坂; in present-day Dangyang, Hubei), where he conveyed Sun Quan's intentions to Liu Bei and pointed out that Jiangdong was very stable. Liu Bei was delighted. Lu Su also met and befriended Liu Bei's adviser Zhuge Liang; he told Zhuge Liang that he was a friend of Zhuge Jin, Zhuge Liang's elder brother. Liu Bei moved to Xiakou, where he instructed Zhuge Liang to follow Lu Su to meet Sun Quan and discuss the formation of a Sun–Liu alliance against Cao Cao. (Note: (到夏口，聞曹公已向荊州，晨夜兼道。比至南郡，而表子琮已降曹公，備惶遽奔走，欲南渡江。肅徑迎之，到當陽長阪，與備會，宣騰權旨，及陳江東彊固，勸備與權併力。備甚歡恱。時諸葛亮與備相隨，肅謂亮曰「我子瑜友也」，即共定交。備遂到夏口，遣亮使權，肅亦反命。) Sanguozhi vol. 54.)

=== Contradiction ===
Pei Songzhi, who annotated Lu Su's biography, argued that Lu Su was actually the first person to propose forming a Sun–Liu alliance against Cao Cao. When Lu Su told Zhuge Liang that he was Zhuge Jin's friend, Zhuge Liang would probably have already heard of Lu Su but had yet to meet him in person. Pei Songzhi pointed out that Zhuge Liang's biography in the Shu Shu (蜀書; Book of Shu) recorded: "Zhuge Liang persuaded Sun Quan with his argument on forming an alliance. Sun Quan was very pleased." Going by the Shu Shu account, the first person who suggested the Sun–Liu alliance should be Zhuge Liang instead of Lu Su. Pei Songzhi commented that the historians in Eastern Wu and Shu Han gave conflicting accounts on who was the first person who conceived the idea of the Sun–Liu alliance because they wanted their respective states to claim that credit. Pei Songzhi also remarked that this was one of the flaws in the Sanguozhi because the author Chen Shou wrote both Lu Su and Zhuge Liang's biographies but the two biographies contradict each other on this point. (Note: (臣松之案：劉備與權併力，共拒中國，皆肅之本謀。又語諸葛亮曰「我子瑜友也」，則亮已亟聞肅言矣。而蜀書亮傳云：「亮以連橫之略說權，權乃大喜。」如似此計始出於亮。若二國史官，各記所聞，競欲稱揚本國容美，各取其功。今此二書，同出一人，而舛互若此，非載述之體也。) Pei Songzhi's annotation in Sanguozhi vol. 54.)

== Urging Sun Quan to resist Cao Cao ==
In late 208, when Sun Quan received news that Cao Cao was planning to lead his forces across the Yangtze to invade Jiangdong, he discussed with his subjects on how to deal with Cao Cao. Everyone present at the meeting advised Sun Quan to surrender and welcome Cao Cao; only Lu Su remained silent. When Sun Quan left the meeting for a change of clothes, Lu Su hurriedly left his seat and followed his lord. Sun Quan sensed that Lu Su had something to say so he held Lu Su's hand and asked him, (Note: (會權得曹公欲東之問，與諸將議，皆勸權迎之，而肅獨不言。權起更衣，肅追於宇下，權知其意，執肅手曰：「卿欲何言？」) Sanguozhi vol. 54.) "What do you want to tell me?" Lu Su replied,

"The others gave you misleading advice. They can't help you accomplish your grand objective. I can surrender and welcome Cao Cao but you can't. Why? Because if I surrender to Cao Cao, he will give me an appointment and treat me just like how he treats his other followers. I can still have a carriage, personal bodyguards and servants; I can continue to mingle with other scholar-officials. Officials won't lose their provinces and commanderies. However, if you surrender to Cao Cao, what will happen to you? I hope you can make up your mind on this important decision soon, and that you won't be affected by what others say." (Note: (肅對曰：「向察衆人之議，專欲誤將軍，不足與圖大事。今肅可迎操耳，如將軍，不可也。何以言之？今肅迎操，操當以肅還付鄉黨，品其名位，猶不失下曹從事，乘犢車，從吏卒，交游士林，累官故不失州郡也。將軍迎操，將安所歸？願早定大計，莫用衆人之議也。」) Sanguozhi vol. 54.)

Sun Quan sighed, "I am very disappointed with those gentlemen. Your thoughts are exactly the same as mine. That's why I say you are Heaven's gift to me." (Note: (權歎息曰：「此諸人持議，甚失孤望；今卿廓開大計，正與孤同，此天以卿賜我也。」) Sanguozhi vol. 54.)

=== Alternative accounts ===
The Wei Shu (魏書; Book of Wei) and the Jiuzhou Chunqiu (九州春秋) gave different accounts on how Lu Su urged Sun Quan to go to war with Cao Cao. They recorded that Lu Su attempted to use reverse psychology to persuade Sun Quan by saying, "Cao Cao is truly a formidable foe. He has engulfed Yuan Shao's territories and his forces are very powerful. If he uses the might of a victorious army to invade a weak and chaotic state, he'll definitely win. Why don't we dispatch our troops to assist him, while you send your family to Ye (Cao Cao's base in northern China)? If not, we'll be in danger." When a furious Sun Quan wanted to execute Lu Su, the latter said, "We are in dire straits. Since you have other plans, why don't you assist Liu Bei instead of executing me?" Sun Quan agreed with Lu Su's idea, so he ordered Zhou Yu to lead his forces to help Liu Bei. (Note: (魏書及九州春秋曰：曹公征荊州，孫權大懼，魯肅實欲勸權拒曹公，乃激說權曰：「彼曹公者，實嚴敵也，新并袁紹，兵馬甚精，乘戰勝之威，伐喪亂之國，克可必也。不如遣兵助之，且送將軍家詣鄴；不然，將危。」權大怒，欲斬肅，肅因曰：「今事已急，即有他圖，何不遣兵助劉備，而欲斬我乎？」權然之，乃遣周瑜助備。) Wei Shu and Jiuzhou Chunqiu annotations in Sanguozhi vol. 54.)

The fourth-century historian Sun Sheng commented that both Wei Zhao's Book of Wu and the Jiang Biao Zhuan (江表傳) recorded that Lu Su urged Sun Quan to resist Cao Cao and build his own empire. When Liu Biao died, Lu Su advised Sun Quan to observe the developments. There was no mention of Lu Su using reverse psychology to persuade Sun Quan to go to war with Cao Cao. Sun Sheng pointed out that there were many others among Sun Quan's subjects who urged their lord to surrender, so it made no sense for Sun Quan to single out Lu Su. He concluded that the accounts on Lu Su's use of reverse psychology are absurd and unreliable. (Note: (孫盛曰：吳書及江表傳，魯肅一見孫權便說拒曹公而論帝王之略，劉表之死也，又請使觀變，無緣方復激說勸迎曹公也。又是時勸迎者衆，而云獨欲斬肅，非其論也。) Sun Sheng's annotation in Sanguozhi vol. 54.)

== Battle of Red Cliffs ==
At the time, Zhou Yu was in Poyang County so Lu Su advised Sun Quan to quickly summon Zhou Yu back to discuss their plans on how to counter Cao Cao's impending invasion. When Zhou Yu returned, he also urged Sun Quan to resist Cao Cao. This resulted in Sun Quan arriving at his final decision to go to war with Cao Cao. (Note: See Zhou Yu#Advising Sun Quan to go to war with Cao Cao for details.) Sun Quan put Zhou Yu in command of his military forces and appointed Lu Su as Colonel Who Praises the Army (贊軍校尉) to assist Zhou Yu in formulating the battle plan. (Note: (時周瑜受使至鄱陽，肅勸追召瑜還。 ... 遂任瑜以行事，以肅為贊軍校尉，助畫方略。) Sanguozhi vol. 54.)

In the winter of 208, the allied forces of Sun Quan and Liu Bei defeated Cao Cao's forces at the decisive Battle of Red Cliffs. When Lu Su returned after the battle, Sun Quan hosted a grand reception for him and said: "Zijing, I dismounted from my horse and received you on foot. Is this enough to illuminate your glory?" Lu Su replied: "No." All the others present at the scene were startled by Lu Su's response. After taking his seat, Lu Su raised his horsewhip and said: "I hope that our lord will spread his might and virtues throughout the Four Seas, expand his territories to cover the Nine Provinces, and successfully build an empire. When he has achieved that and he comes to receive me on a carriage, I will be the first to feel honoured." Sun Quan clapped his hands and laughed. (Note: (曹公破走，肅即先還，權大請諸將迎肅。肅將入閤拜，權起禮之，因謂曰：「子敬，孤持鞌下馬相迎，足以顯卿未？」肅趨進曰：「未也。」衆人聞之，無不愕然。就坐，徐舉鞭言曰：「願至尊威德加乎四海，總括九州，克成帝業，更以安車軟輪徵肅，始當顯耳。」權撫掌歡笑。) Sanguozhi vol. 54.)

== Handing over Jing Province to Liu Bei ==
In 210, Liu Bei travelled to Jing (京; present-day Zhenjiang, Jiangsu) to meet Sun Quan and request for the governorship of Jing Province. Only Lu Su advised Sun Quan to "lend" Jing Province to Liu Bei so as to strengthen the Sun-Liu alliance against Cao Cao. (Note: (後備詣京見權，求都督荊州，惟肅勸權借之，共拒曹公。) Sanguozhi vol. 54.)

At the time, Lü Fan urged Sun Quan to hold Liu Bei hostage in Jiangdong and prevent him from returning to Jing Province. However, Lu Su objected: "No. My lord, you may have received the blessings of Heaven, but Cao Cao is still a foe to be reckoned with. As we have recently taken control of Jing Province, we haven't earned the trust and support of its people yet. It's better to 'lend' it to Liu Bei and let him help us pacify the area. The best strategy to adopt now is to create more enemies for Cao Cao and less enemies for ourselves." Sun Quan agreed with Lu Su. (Note: (漢晉春秋曰：呂範勸留備，肅曰：「不可。將軍雖神武命世，然曹公威力實重，初臨荊州，恩信未洽，宜以借備，使撫安之。多操之敵，而自為樹黨，計之上也。」權即從之。) Han Jin Chunqiu annotation in Sanguozhi vol. 54.)

Cao Cao was writing when he received news that Sun Quan had "lent" Jing Province to Liu Bei. He dropped his brush upon hearing that. (Note: (曹公聞權以土地業備，方作書，落筆於地。) Sanguozhi vol. 54.) (Note: Sima Guang did not include this anecdote in Zizhi Tongjian as he felt that Cao Cao wouldn't have behaved in such a manner.)

== Succeeding Zhou Yu ==
In 210, when Zhou Yu became critically ill, he wrote to Sun Quan:

"As of now, the empire has yet to be pacified, and this has always been a worry for me. I hope that you, my lord, can make plans for the future now and have a smooth journey later. Now, we have Cao Cao as our enemy, and Liu Bei is also nearby in Gong'an County. We have yet to gain the full allegiance of the people at the border, so it is best to have a competent general to guard the area. Lu Su, with his intelligence and wisdom, is capable of taking up that responsibility, as well as replacing me. The day I die will be the day all my lingerings cease." (Note: (周瑜病困，上疏曰：「當今天下，方有事役，是瑜乃心夙夜所憂，願至尊先慮未然，然後康樂。今旣與曹操為敵，劉備近在公安，邊境密邇，百姓未附，宜得良將以鎮撫之。魯肅智略足任，乞以代瑜。瑜隕踣之日，所懷盡矣。」) Sanguozhi vol. 54.)

The Jiang Biao Zhuan (江表傳) provided a longer, but generally similar, account of Zhou Yu's message to Sun Quan before his death. Zhou Yu wrote:

"I am of ordinary calibre, but I received very special and generous treatment from you, and earned your trust. I was entrusted with an honourable duty – placed in command of the armed forces and having full control over them. We should take control of Ba and Shu (present-day Sichuan and Chongqing) first and then conquer Xiangyang, after which we can depend on our might to secure victory. It is unfortunate that I contracted such a serious illness, but my condition is stabilising after receiving medical treatment. Everyone will die eventually, so I will not regret if my lifespan is destined to be short. I only feel anguish over not having realised my ambition and not being able to follow your orders anymore. Now, Cao Cao still remains a threat in the north and the battlefields are not clear yet. Liu Bei may be seeking shelter under us, but the way we are treating him is equivalent to raising a tiger. There is no beginning or end to the events in the world. This is a time for the ministers and you, my lord, to be worried. Lu Su is loyal and upright and he does not falter in the face of adversity. He can replace me. A dying person's last words are said in good faith. If you can heed this piece of advice, I will not have died in vain." (Note: (江表傳載：初瑜疾困，與權牋曰：「瑜以凡才，昔受討逆殊特之遇，委以腹心，遂荷榮任，統御兵馬，志執鞭弭，自效戎行。規定巴蜀，次取襄陽，憑賴威靈，謂若在握。至以不謹，道遇暴疾，昨自醫療，日加無損。人生有死，脩短命矣，誠不足惜，但恨微志未展，不復奉教命耳。方今曹公在北，疆埸未靜，劉備寄寓，有似養虎，天下之事，未知終始，此朝士旰食之秋，至尊垂慮之日也。魯肅忠烈，臨事不苟，可以代瑜。人之將死，其言也善，儻或可採，瑜死不朽矣。」案此牋與本傳所載，意旨雖同，其辭乖異耳。) Jiang Biao Zhuan annotation in Sanguozhi vol. 54.)

After Zhou Yu's death, Lu Su was appointed as Colonel of Vehement Martial Might (奮武校尉) and succeeded Zhou Yu. He took charge of the 4,000 troops and the four counties which used to be under Zhou Yu's control. Cheng Pu succeeded Zhou Yu as the Grand Administrator (太守) of Nan Commandery (南郡; around present-day Jingzhou, Hubei). Lu Su was at Jiangling County initially, so he moved to Lukou (陸口; in present-day Jiayu County, Hubei) and garrisoned there. Lu Su governed with justice and benevolence, and the number of troops under his command increased to over 10,000. He was subsequently promoted to Lieutenant-General (偏將軍) and appointed as the Administrator of Hanchang Commandery (漢昌郡; around present-day Pingjiang County, Hunan). (Note: (即拜肅奮武校尉，代瑜領兵。瑜士衆四千餘人，奉邑四縣，皆屬焉。令程普領南郡太守。肅初住江陵，後下屯陸口，威恩大行，衆增萬餘人，拜漢昌太守、偏將軍。) Sanguozhi vol. 54.)

In 214, Lu Su accompanied Sun Quan on a campaign at Wan County (皖縣; present-day Qianshan County, Anhui), a garrison under Cao Cao's control. After Sun Quan's forces emerged victorious, Lu Su was reassigned as General Who Crosses the River (橫江將軍). (Note: (十九年，從權破皖城，轉橫江將軍。) Sanguozhi vol. 54.)

== Sun–Liu territorial dispute ==
=== Background ===
Before Zhou Yu died, he, along with Gan Ning and others, had constantly urged Sun Quan to seize Yi Province (covering present-day Sichuan and Chongqing) from its governor, Liu Zhang. However, Zhou Yu died of illness while making preparations for an invasion of Yi Province. When Sun Quan asked Liu Bei for his opinion, Liu Bei, who secretly had the intention of seizing Yi Province for himself, lied to Sun Quan: "Liu Zhang and I are members of the imperial clan, so we should strive to uphold the Han dynasty with the aid of our ancestors' blessings. Now, when I heard that Liu Zhang has offended his neighbours, I feel afraid and don't dare to probe further. I hope you can show leniency towards him. If you don't, I will retire and return to the countryside." Liu Bei revealed his true intentions later when he attacked Liu Zhang himself and eventually seized control of Yi Province. During the campaign against Liu Zhang, Liu Bei left his general Guan Yu behind to guard Jing Province in his absence. When Sun Quan heard about Liu Bei's takeover of Yi Province, he angrily remarked: "This cunning barbarian dares to trick me!" (Note: (先是，益州牧劉璋綱維頹弛，周瑜、甘寧並勸權取蜀，權以咨備，備內欲自規，乃偽報曰：「備與璋託為宗室，兾憑英靈，以匡漢朝。今璋得罪左右，備獨竦懼，非所敢聞，願加寬貸。若不獲請，備當放髮歸於山林。」後備西圖璋，留關羽守，權曰：「猾虜乃敢挾詐！」) Sanguozhi vol. 54.)

At the same time, tensions were rising at the Sun–Liu border in Jing Province as both sides became more suspicious of each other. Lu Su tried to reduce the tensions by being friendly towards Liu Bei's side. After Liu Bei took over Yi Province, Sun Quan asked him to return three commanderies in southern Jing Province – Changsha (長沙), Lingling (零陵; around present-day Yongzhou, Hunan) and Guiyang (桂陽; around present-day Chenzhou, Hunan) – but Liu Bei refused. Sun Quan then ordered his general Lü Meng to lead his forces to seize the three commanderies by force. When Liu Bei found out, he returned to Gong'an County and sent Guan Yu to lead an army to stop Lü Meng. (Note: (及羽與肅鄰界，數生狐疑，疆埸紛錯，肅常以歡好撫之。備旣定益州，權求長沙、零、桂，備不承旨，權遣呂蒙率衆進取。備聞，自還公安，遣羽爭三郡。) Sanguozhi vol. 54.)

=== Negotiations ===
At Yiyang, Lu Su invited Guan Yu to attend a meeting to discuss the dispute. During the negotiations, both sides stationed their soldiers more than 100 paces away from the meeting area and the officers present at the talks were each armed with only a blade weapon. Lu Su told Guan Yu: (Note: (肅住益陽，與羽相拒。肅邀羽相見，各駐兵馬百步上，但請將軍單刀俱會。肅因責數羽曰： ...) Sanguozhi vol. 54.)

"Initially, my lord "lent" these lands to your lord because he suffered defeats and didn't have a base at that time. However, now that he has obtained Yi Province, he doesn't want to "return" the lands. When we ask for only three commanderies, you still refuse..." (Note: (... 「國家區區本以土地借卿家者，卿家軍敗遠來，無以為資故也。今已得益州，旣無奉還之意，但求三郡，又不從命。」) Sanguozhi vol. 54.)

Before Lu Su could finish what he was saying, an unnamed person interrupted him and said: "Whoever has the ability to govern the land shall have control over it. Isn't it so?" Lu Su angrily rebuked that person in a firm and stern tone. Guan Yu drew his sword, stood up and said, "This is a state-level problem. We can't hope to understand it." He left after that. (Note: (語未究竟，坐有一人曰：「夫土地者，惟德所在耳，何常之有！」肅厲聲呵之，辭色甚切。羽操刀起謂曰：「此自國家事，是人何知！」目使之去。) Sanguozhi vol. 54.)

==== Wu Shu account ====
Wei Zhao's Book of Wu provided more details on the meeting. Prior to the talks, Lu Su's subordinates feared that Guan Yu would try to harm Lu Su, so they advised Lu Su against attending the meeting. However, Lu Su replied: "It's better for us to settle this issue in a peaceful manner. Liu Bei may have acted against our lord's interests, but we haven't agreed on who is right and who is wrong. Do you think Guan Yu will dare to do something as rash as killing me at this point in time?" (Note: (吳書曰：肅欲與羽會語，諸將疑恐有變，議不可往。肅曰：「今日之事，宜相開譬。劉備負國，是非未決，羽亦何敢重欲干命！」) Wu Shu annotation in Sanguozhi vol. 54.)

Lu Su then met Guan Yu, who told him:

"My lord was actively involved in the Battle of Red Cliffs and he didn't rest well during that time. He relied on his own strength to overcome the enemy. How can he not gain even a single piece of land despite his efforts? And now you come to claim the lands from him?" (Note: (乃自就羽。羽曰：「烏林之役，左將軍身在行間，寢不脫介，自力破魏，豈得徒勞，無一塊壤，而足下來欲收地邪？」) Wu Shu annotation in Sanguozhi vol. 54.)

Lu Su replied:

"No. When I first met your lord at Changban, his men were too few to form even a division and his situation then was very bad as compared to now. My lord considered that your lord didn't have a place to settle down, so he offered your lord protection and shelter. However, your lord wasn't honest with us and he acted on his own. That was why our relations soured. Now, after taking over Yi Province, he still wants to keep Jing Province for himself as well? This isn't what a reasonable man would do, much less a leader of men! I heard that those who forsake moral principles for the purpose of satisfying their personal greed will meet their doom. You hold an important appointment, but lack good sense in handling issues, should rely on moral education, but instead depend on using strength. If what one does is morally right, why should he worry that he won't become successful?" (Note: (肅曰：「不然。始與豫州觀於長阪，豫州之衆不當一校，計窮慮極，志勢摧弱，圖欲遠竄，望不及此。主上矜愍豫州之身無有處所，不愛土地士人之力，使有所庇廕以濟其患，而豫州私獨飾情，愆德隳好。今已藉手於西州矣，又欲翦并荊州之土，斯蓋凡夫所不忍行，而況整領人物之主乎！肅聞貪而棄義，必為禍階。吾子屬當重任，曾不能明道處分，以義輔時，而負恃弱衆以圖力爭，師曲為老，將何獲濟？」) Wu Shu annotation in Sanguozhi vol. 54.)

Guan Yu did not respond to what Lu Su said. (Note: (羽無以荅。) Wu Shu annotation in Sanguozhi vol. 54.)

Liu Bei eventually agreed to divide Jing Province between his and Sun Quan's domains along the Xiang River. Both sides withdrew their forces. (Note: (備遂割湘水為界，於是罷軍。) Sanguozhi vol. 54.)

== Death ==
Lu Su died at the age of 46 (by East Asian age reckoning) in 217. Sun Quan mourned his death and attended his funeral. Zhuge Liang also held a memorial service for Lu Su. (Note: (肅年四十六，建安二十二年卒。權為舉哀，又臨其葬。諸葛亮亦為發哀。) Sanguozhi vol. 54.)

== Descendants ==
Lu Su's son, Lu Shu (魯淑) (217 - 274), was born physically strong. Zhang Cheng once remarked that Lu Shu would become very outstanding in the future. Between 258 and 264, during the reign of Sun Xiu, Lu Shu served as General of Illustrious Martial Might (昭武將軍) and Area Commander (督) of Wuchang, and was named as a Marquis of a Chief Village (都亭侯). Between 269 and 271, during the reign of Sun Xiu's successor, Sun Hao, Lu Shu was reassigned as the Area Commander of Xiakou (夏口). Lu Shu was known for being very disciplined and competent in his duties. He died in 274. (Note: (肅遺腹子淑旣壯，濡須督張承謂終當到至。永安中，為昭武將軍、都亭侯、武昌督。建衡中，假節，遷夏口督。所在嚴整，有方幹。鳳皇三年卒。) Sanguozhi vol. 54.)

Lu Shu's son, Lu Mu (魯睦), inherited his father's marquis title and military post. (Note: (子睦襲爵，領兵馬。) Sanguozhi vol. 54.)

== Appraisal ==
Wei Zhao's Book of Wu (吳書) described Lu Su as follows: Lu Su was a strict person who rarely indulged in material pleasures, led a frugal life, and had no interest in common hobbies. He maintained good military discipline and executed orders without fail. Even when he was in the army, he was often seen reading books. He was proficient in arguing and writing. He could think far and possessed an exemplary sense of judgment. He was the best after Zhou Yu. (Note: (吳書曰：肅為人方嚴，寡於玩飾，內外節儉，不務俗好。治軍整頓，禁令必行，雖在軍陣，手不釋卷。又善談論，能屬文辭，思度弘遠，有過人之明。周瑜之後，肅為之冠。) Wu Shu annotation in Sanguozhi vol. 54.)

Sun Quan once told Lü Meng:

"I had a discussion (with Lu Su) and obtained a plan on establishing a dynasty. That was one pleasant moment. Later, when Mengde took control of Liu Cong's territories, he claimed he would lead thousands of land and marine troops south (to attack me). I gathered all my subordinates and asked for their opinions, but none of their responses matched my thoughts. Zibu and Wenbiao suggested I surrender, but Zijing argued that I shouldn't, and he urged me to recall Gongjin and put him in command (of the army) to engage the enemy. That was another pleasant moment. However, in terms of decisiveness, he was inferior to Zhang and Su. Although this weakness of his was evident when he advised me to 'lend' land to Xuande, this shortcoming wasn't sufficient to overshadow his two strengths." (Note: In this statement, Sun Quan commented that he was very pleased with two things that Lu Su had done for him: drafting a plan for him to emerge as one of three major contending powers in China; helping him arrive at his resolution to ally with Liu Bei against Cao Cao just before the Battle of Red Cliffs. However, Sun Quan also thought that Lu Su was incompetent in managing diplomatic ties as compared to Zhang Yi and Su Qin, two famous strategists and diplomats in the Warring States period. Despite so, Sun Quan still thought that Lu Su's two major contributions outshone this imperfection.) (Note: (孤與宴語，便及大略帝王之業，此一快也。後孟德因獲劉琮之勢，張言方率數十萬眾水步俱下。孤普請諸將，咨問所宜，無適先對，至子布、文表，俱言宜遣使修檄迎之，子敬即駁言不可，勸孤急呼公瑾，付任以眾，逆而擊之，此二快也。且其決計策，意出張蘇遠矣；後雖勸吾借玄德地，是其一短，不足以損失二長也。) Sanguozhi vol. 54.)

In May 229, when Sun Quan was attending a ceremony to declare himself emperor and establish the state of Eastern Wu, he told his subjects: "In the past, Lu Zijing often spoke about what is happening now. Indeed, he had good foresight." (Note: (權稱尊號，臨壇，顧謂公卿曰：「昔魯子敬甞道此，可謂明於事勢矣。) Sanguozhi vol. 54.)

== In Romance of the Three Kingdoms ==
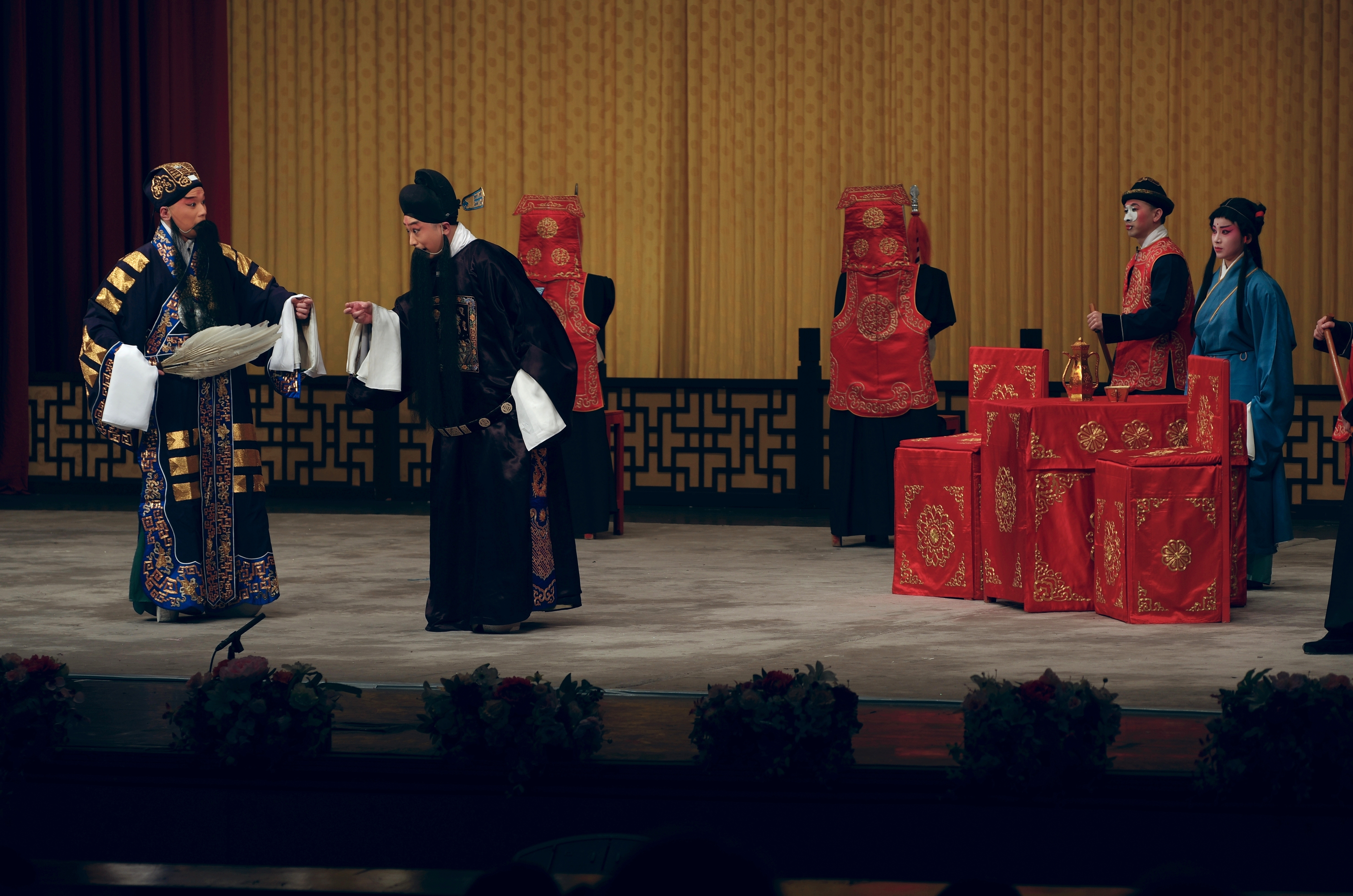
Lu Su talks with Zhuge Liang (left) before the Battle of Red Cliffs, from a Peking opera performance in Tianchan Theatre by Shanghai Jingju Theatre Company on January 17, 2015.

Lu Su appeared as a character in the 14th-century historical novel Romance of the Three Kingdoms, which romanticises the historical events before and during the Three Kingdoms period. During his initial appearance, the novel does portray Lu Su's intelligence and generosity quite accurately, such as the story of granary anecdote.

Furthermore, Lu Su also foresees the eventual fall of the Han Dynasty and Cao Cao's growing ambition. Therefore, he recommends Sun Quan to take advantage of the turmoil in the north, where Cao Cao are fighting his battles, and establish a good control of his regions as a preparation for himself to become an emperor (decades later, Sun Quan eventually becomes the Emperor of Wu).

But later in the novel, Lu Su's role is significantly downplayed as compared to his historical counterpart, such that he is mainly used as a foil between Zhuge Liang and Zhou Yu to highlight their intelligence, especially for the former. He is also used to add minor comic relief to the rivalry between Zhuge Liang and Zhou Yu, particularly in the events leading to the Battle of Red Cliffs in which Lu Su plays the mediating roles between the two strategists. Although he receives a high rank in Wu, he is also portrayed as an honest and sententious man who is often easily cheated and taken advantage of by Zhuge Liang's intellect, resulting in his maladroit handling of the territorial dispute over Jing Province between Liu Bei and Sun Quan.

== In popular culture ==
Lu Su was first introduced as a playable character in the eighth installment of Koei's Dynasty Warriors video game series and Warriors Orochi 4. He also appears in Koei's strategy game series Romance of the Three Kingdoms.

== See also ==
- Lists of people of the Three Kingdoms
