= Zhou Yu =

Chinese general (175–210)

- 周瑜
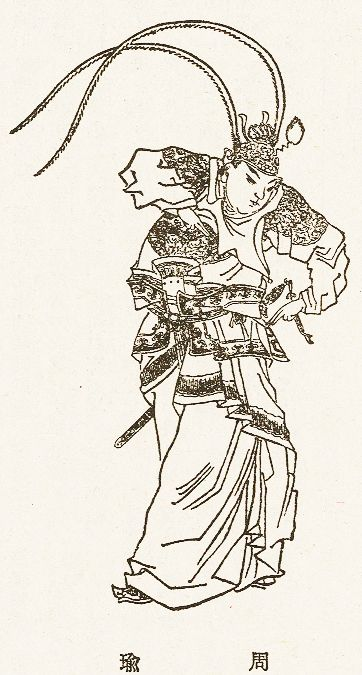
- Qing dynasty illustration of Zhou Yu

Administrator of Nan Commandery (南郡太守) (under Sun Quan)
- In office 209 – 210
- Monarch: Emperor Xian of Han

Lieutenant-General (偏將軍) (under Sun Quan)
- In office 209 – 210
- Monarch: Emperor Xian of Han

Central Protector of the Army (中護軍) (under Sun Ce, then Sun Quan)
- In office 198 – 209
- Monarch: Emperor Xian of Han

Administrator of Jiangxia (江夏太守) (under Sun Ce)
- In office ?–?
- Monarch: Emperor Xian of Han

Chief of Chungu (春穀長) (under Sun Ce)
- In office ?–?
- Monarch: Emperor Xian of Han

Personal details
- Born: 175 (Note: The Sanguozhi did not specifically state the year in which Zhou Yu died. It simply recorded that he died of illness at the age of 36 (by East Asian age reckoning) in Baqiu while he was on his way to Jiangling. (Note: (瑜還江陵，為行裝，而道於巴丘病卒，時年三十六。) Sanguozhi vol. 54.) The Zizhi Tongjian recorded that he died in the 15th year of the Jian'an era in the reign of Emperor Xian of Han. By calculation, Zhou Yu's birth year should be 175.) Shucheng County, Anhui
- Died: 210 (aged 35) Yueyang, Hunan
- Spouse: Xiao Qiao
- Children: Zhou Xun; Zhou Yin; Lady Zhou
- Parents: Zhou Yi (father); Unknown (mother)
- Occupation: General, strategist
- Courtesy name: Gongjin (公瑾)
- Nickname: "Mei Zhou Lang" (美周郎)

Zhou Yu
- Chinese: 周瑜
Transcriptions
Standard Mandarin
- Hanyu Pinyin: Zhōu Yú
- Bopomofo: ㄓㄡ ㄩˊ
- Wade–Giles: Chou^{1} Yü^{2}
- IPA: [ʈʂóʊ.y̌]
Wu
- Romanization: ^{1}Tseu ^{6}Yu
Hakka
- Pha̍k-fa-sṳ: Chû Yì
Yue: Cantonese
- Yale Romanization: Jāu Yùh
- Jyutping: zau1 jyu4
- IPA: [tsɐw˥.jy˩]
Southern Min
- Hokkien POJ: Chiu Lû
- Teochew Peng'im: Ziu^{1} Ru^{5}

Zhou Yu (Chinese: 周瑜,) (175–210), courtesy name Gongjin (Chinese: 公瑾), was a Chinese military general. He served under the warlords Sun Ce and later Sun Quan in the late Eastern Han dynasty. Zhou Yu played a leading role in defeating the numerically superior forces of the northern warlord Cao Cao at the Battle of Red Cliffs in late 208, and again at the Battle of Jiangling in 209. Zhou Yu's victories served as the bedrock of Sun Quan's regime, which in 222 became Eastern Wu. Zhou Yu did not live to see Sun Quan's enthronement, however, as he died at the age of 35 in 210 while preparing to invade Yi Province.

In the 14th-century novel Romance of the Three Kingdoms, which has greatly shaped Zhou Yu’s popular image, he is portrayed as a brilliant and dashing yet temperamentally insecure figure, marked by his jealousy toward Zhuge Liang.

== Family background ==
Zhou Yu was from Shu County (舒縣), Lujiang Commandery (廬江郡), which is present-day Shucheng County, Anhui. Two of his relatives – his great-uncle Zhou Jing (周景), and Zhou Jing's son Zhou Zhong (周忠) – served as the grand commandant (太尉) in the Han central government, the highest military official position. Zhou Yu's father, Zhou Yi (周異), was a prefect of the imperial capital, Luoyang. (Note: (周瑜字公瑾，廬江舒人也。 ... 從祖父景，景子忠，皆為漢太尉。父異，洛陽令。) Sanguozhi vol. 54.) (Note: Zhou Jing and Zhou Zhong have biographies in Book of the Later Han (volume 45), along with the biographies of Zhou Jing's father Zhou Xing (周兴) and grandfather Zhou Rong (周荣).)

== Service under Sun Ce ==
=== Friendship ===
Around the year 191, Sun Jian raised an army to join the Campaign against Dong Zhuo and moved his family from Shouchun (寿春; around present-day Shou County, Anhui) to Zhou Yu's hometown in Shu County. Zhou Yu befriended Sun Jian's eldest son, Sun Ce, who was born in the same year as him. The two became very close friends. Zhou Yu not only offered to let Sun Ce and his family stay in the Zhou family home, but also paid respects to Sun Ce's mother Lady Wu as if she were his mother. (Note: (初，孫堅興義兵討董卓，徙家於舒。堅子策與瑜同年，獨相友善，瑜推道南大宅以舍策，升堂拜母，有無通共。) Sanguozhi vol. 54.)

The Jiang Biao Zhuan (江表傳) contains a slightly different account of how Zhou Yu and Sun Ce met each other. It mentions that Zhou Yu heard of Sun Ce's reputation and wanted to meet him, so he travelled from Shu County to Shouchun to visit Sun Ce. The two of them developed such a close friendship that Sun Ce heeded Zhou Yu's advice to bring along his family and relocate from Shouchun to Shu County. (Note: (江表傳曰：堅為朱儁所表，為佐軍，留家著壽春。策年十餘歲，已交結知名，聲譽發聞。有周瑜者，與策同年，亦英達夙成，聞策聲聞，自舒來造焉。便推結分好，義同斷金，勸策徙居舒，策從之。) Jiang Biao Zhuan annotation in Sanguozhi vol. 46.)

=== Conquering Jiangdong ===
Zhou Yu later travelled to Danyang Commandery (丹楊郡; around present-day Xuancheng, Anhui) to join his uncle Zhou Shang (周尚), who was serving as the Administrator (太守) of Danyang. Around 194, Sun Ce (孙策), then acting under orders from the warlord Yuan Shu, led troops into Yang Province to aid his relatives Wu Jing and Sun Ben against the encroachments of the warlord Liu Yao. While Sun Ce was preparing to cross the Yangtze River at Liyang (歷陽; present-day He County, Anhui) for an attack on Liu Yao, he sent a messenger to inform Zhou Yu about his plans. Zhou Yu led troops to assist Sun Ce, who gratefully told Zhou Yu: "With your aid, I can attain greatness!" (Note: (瑜從父尚為丹楊太守，瑜往省之。 ... 會策將東渡，到歷陽，馳書報瑜，瑜將兵迎策。策大喜曰：「吾得卿，諧也。」) Sanguozhi vol. 54.)

Zhou Yu then joined Sun Ce in his conquests of Hengjiang (橫江; southeast of present-day He County, Anhui, on the northern shore of the Yangtze) and Dangli (當利; east of present-day He County, Anhui). They crossed the Yangtze River, conquered Moling (秣陵; in present-day Nanjing, Jiangsu) and defeated Liu Yao's forces under Ze Rong and Xue Li (薛禮). They also conquered Hushu (湖孰; southeast of present-day Jiangning, Jiangsu), Jiangcheng (江乘; north of present-day Jurong, Jiangsu), and Qu'e (曲阿; present-day Danyang, Jiangsu). Liu Yao fled in the wake of his defeat and the strength of Sun Ce's forces increased to tens of thousands. (Note: (遂從攻橫江、當利，皆拔之。乃渡擊秣陵，破笮融、薛禮，轉下湖孰、江乘，進入曲阿，劉繇奔走，而策之衆已數萬矣。) Sanguozhi vol. 54.)

=== Later service under Sun Ce ===
Sun Ce told Zhou Yu: "I now have sufficient military power to conquer Wu and pacify the Shanyue. You can return to Danyang and station there." Zhou Yu then made his way back to Danyang. Around 196, Yuan Shu had sent his cousin Yuan Yin (袁胤) to replace Zhou Shang as the Administrator of Danyang, so Zhou Shang and Zhou Yu went to Shouchun (壽春; present-day Shou County, Anhui) to meet Yuan Shu. Yuan Shu wanted to recruit Zhou Yu to serve under him, but Zhou Yu foresaw Yuan Shu's downfall so he pretended to ask for the appointment of Chief (長) of Juchao (居巢; present-day Juchao District, Chaohu, Anhui) while secretly planning to leave Yuan Shu and join Sun Ce. After Yuan Shu approved his request, Zhou Yu travelled to Wu Commandery (around present-day Suzhou, Jiangsu) via Juchao.

In 198, Zhou Yu arrived in Wu Commandery, where Sun Ce personally received and welcomed him. Sun Ce appointed Zhou Yu as General of the Household Who Establishes Might (建威中郎將) and put him in command of 2,000 troops and gave him 50 horses. (Note: (因謂瑜曰：「吾以此衆取吳會平山越已足。卿還鎮丹楊。」瑜還。頃之，袁術遣從弟胤代尚為太守，而瑜與尚俱還壽春。術欲以瑜為將，瑜觀術終無所成，故求為居巢長，欲假塗東歸，術聽之。遂自居巢還吳。是歲，建安三年也。策親自迎瑜，授建威中郎將，即與兵二千人，騎五十匹。) Sanguozhi vol. 54.) Sun Ce said: "Zhou Gongjin is an extraordinary hero and talent. He's very close to me and we are like brothers. I still remember that time when he brought his troops and supplies from Danyang to assist me in my campaign. I can never repay him for his help and contributions." (Note: (江表傳曰：策又給瑜鼓吹，為治館舍，贈賜莫與為比。策令曰：「周公瑾英雋異才，與孤有總角之好，骨肉之分。如前在丹楊，發衆及船糧以濟大事，論德酬功，此未足以報者也。」) Jiang Biao Zhuan annotation in Sanguozhi vol. 54.)

Zhou Yu was 23 years old at the time, and he was nicknamed "Zhou Lang" (周郎; literally "Zhou the youth") by the people in Wu. He was garrisoned in Lujiang Commandery (廬江郡) and later moved to Niuzhu (牛渚) before assuming his appointment as the Chief (長) of Chungu County (春穀縣; northwest of present-day Fanchang County, Anhui). When Sun Ce planned his attack Jing Province (covering present-day Hubei and Hunan), he appointed Zhou Yu as Central Protector of the Army (中護軍) and the Administrator (太守) of Jiangxia Commandery (江夏郡). Zhou Yu accompanied Sun Ce in the conquest of Wan (皖; present-day Qianshan County, Anhui). Zhou Yu then joined Sun Ce in attacking Xunyang County (尋陽縣; southwest of present-day Huangmei County, Hubei), where they defeated a minor warlord Liu Xun. They then invaded Jiangxia Commandery (江夏郡; around present-day Xinzhou District, Wuhan, Hubei) and subsequently pacified Yuzhang Commandery (豫章郡; around present-day Nanchang, Jiangxi) and Luling Commandery (廬陵郡; around present-day Ji'an, Jiangxi). Zhou Yu later returned to Baqiu (巴丘; present-day Xiajiang County, Jiangxi) and garrisoned there. (Note: (復進尋陽，破劉勳，討江夏，還定豫章、廬陵，留鎮巴丘。) Sanguozhi vol. 54.) (Note: Pei Songzhi pointed out that this Baqiu was not the same location as the place where Zhou Yu died, which was also called "Baqiu". The "Baqiu" where Zhou Yu died was at present-day Yueyang, Hunan.)

== Service under Sun Quan ==
=== Advising Sun Quan not to send a hostage ===
Sun Ce was assassinated in the year 200 by the followers of Xu Gong, a commandery administrator whom he killed earlier. His younger brother, Sun Quan, succeeded him and took control of his territories. Zhou Yu rushed back to Wu Commandery (around present-day Suzhou, Jiangsu) to attend Sun Ce's funeral and remained in Wu Commandery after the funeral. Zhou Yu then held the appointment of Central Protector of the Army (中護軍). As Sun Quan was still relatively young and inexperienced then, Zhou Yu and Zhang Zhao assisted him in overseeing the day-to-day affairs in the Jiangdong territories. (Note: (五年，策薨，權統事。瑜將兵赴喪，遂留吳，以中護軍與長史張昭共掌衆事。) Sanguozhi vol. 54.)

Around the time, the warlord Cao Cao, who controlled the Han court and the figurehead Emperor Xian, had recently defeated his rival Yuan Shao at the Battle of Guandu and was achieving success in his campaigns to unify northern China. In 202, Cao Cao wrote a letter to Sun Quan, demanding that Sun Quan send one of his sons to the imperial capital Xu (許; present-day Xuchang, Henan) as a hostage, so as to secure Sun Quan's allegiance towards him. Sun Quan gathered all his subjects, including Zhang Zhao and Qin Song, for a discussion, but they could not arrive at a conclusion. (Note: (江表傳曰：曹公新破袁紹，兵威日盛，建安七年，下書責權質任子。權召羣臣會議，張昭、秦松等猶豫不能決， ...) Jiang Biao Zhuan annotation in Sanguozhi vol. 54.)

Sun Quan was reluctant to send one of his sons to be a hostage in the capital, so he had another discussion with only his mother Lady Wu and Zhou Yu. (Note: (... 權意不欲遣質，乃獨將瑜詣母前定議， ...) Jiang Biao Zhuan annotation in Sanguozhi vol. 54.) Zhou Yu said:

"In the past, when the Chu state first came into existence, its territory covered only part of the Jingshan Mountains and less than 100 square li. Later, due to the competency of its rulers, it was able to expand its boundaries and build its foundation at Ying, and then conquer the lands from Jing and Yang provinces to Nanhai. Its legacy lasted for more than 900 years. Now, you've inherited the remaining resources of your father and your elder brother. You control six commanderies, have many troops and much supplies, and your men are willing to fight for you with their lives. You extract copper from the mountains to manufacture coins and you obtain salt from seawater. Your domain is prosperous and your people are at peace. When your people raise the sails on their boats, they venture out in the morning and return only in the evening. Your army is strong and has high morale so it is invincible. Why should you send a hostage just because you've received a threat? Once you send a hostage, you will establish a connection between you and the Caos, and when they use the Emperor's authority to command you, you will have no choice but to follow their orders. This will result in you falling under their control. When that happens, you become no more than just a vassal lord with dozens of servants, carriages and horses, and is this any better as compared to being a major power in southern China? I suggest you don't send a hostage, and observe how the situation changes. If the Caos really do succeed in unifying the Empire by righteous means, it's still not too late for you to submit to them after that. If they resort to violence, they will end up destroying themselves if they don't give up because starting a war is equivalent to lighting a fire. You should keep a low profile but continue to resist their aggression and wait for your destiny. So, why should you send a hostage?" (Note: (... 瑜曰：「昔楚國初封於荊山之側，不滿百里之地，繼嗣賢能，廣土開境，立基於郢，遂據荊揚，至於南海，傳業延祚，九百餘年。今將軍承父兄餘資，六郡之衆，兵精糧多，將士用命，鑄山為銅，煑海為鹽，境內富饒，人不思亂，汎舟舉帆，朝發夕到，士風勁勇，所向無敵，有何偪迫，而欲送質？質一入，不得不與曹氏相首尾，與相首尾，則命召不得不往，便見制於人也。極不過一侯印，僕從十餘人，車數乘，馬數匹，豈與南靣稱孤同哉？不如勿遣，徐觀其變。若曹氏能率義以正天下，將軍事之未晚。若圖為暴，亂兵猶火也，不戢將自焚。將軍韜勇抗威，以待天命，何送質之有！」) Jiang Biao Zhuan annotation in Sanguozhi vol. 54.)

Lady Wu agreed with Zhou Yu and she said: "What Gongjin said is true. Gongjin was around the same age as Bofu as he was only a month younger than Bofu. I see Gongjin as a son, so you should treat him like an elder brother." Sun Quan heeded their advice and did not send a hostage to Cao Cao. (Note: (權母曰：「公瑾議是也。公瑾與伯符同年，小一月耳，我視之如子也，汝其兄事之。」遂不送質。) Jiang Biao Zhuan annotation in Sanguozhi vol. 54.)

=== Battles against Huang Zu ===
In 206, Zhou Yu and Sun Quan's cousin Sun Yu attacked bandits at Ma (麻) and Bao (保) counties and killed their chiefs and captured thousands of enemies. Later that year, Huang Zu, the Administrator (太守) of Jiangxia Commandery (江夏郡; around present-day Xinzhou District, Wuhan, Hubei), sent his subordinate Deng Long (鄧龍) to lead a few thousand troops to attack Sun Quan's forces in Chaisang Commandery (柴桑郡; around present-day Jiujiang, Jiangxi). Zhou Yu attacked Deng Long, captured him alive, and sent him as a prisoner-of-war to Wu Commandery (around present-day Suzhou, Jiangsu). (Note: (十一年，督孫瑜等討麻、保二屯，梟其渠帥，囚俘萬餘口，還備官亭。江夏太守黃祖遣將鄧龍將兵數千人入柴桑，瑜追討擊，生虜龍送吳。) Sanguozhi vol. 54.)

In the spring of 208, Sun Quan ordered an attack on Jiangxia, which was defended by Huang Zu. Zhou Yu was assigned as the Chief Commander of the Front Army (前部大督) and he, along with Lü Meng, (Note: (十三年春，權討江夏，瑜為前部大督。 ... 後權復征江夏，統為前鋒， ...) Sanguozhi vol. 54.) Ling Tong (Note: (從征黃祖，祖令都督陳就逆以水軍出戰。蒙勒前鋒，親梟就首，將士乘勝，進攻其城。祖聞就死，委城走，兵追禽之。) Sanguozhi vol. 55.) and others, scored a major victory over the enemy. Huang Zu was killed by Sun Quan's forces when attempting to escape. (Note: (十三年春，權復征黃祖，祖先遣舟兵拒軍，都尉呂蒙破其前鋒，而淩統、董襲等盡銳攻之，遂屠其城。祖挺身亡走，騎士馮則追梟其首，虜其男女數萬口。) Sanguozhi vol. 47.)

=== Advising Sun Quan to go to war with Cao Cao ===
In the late autumn of 208, Cao Cao started a campaign aimed at wiping out all opposing forces in southern China. When his forces arrived in Jing Province (covering present-day Hubei and Hunan), the provincial governor Liu Cong surrendered without putting up any resistance. When Sun Quan's men heard that Cao Cao had obtained tens of thousands of Jing Province's land and naval troops, they were all very afraid because they knew Cao Cao's next target was Sun Quan's territories in Jiangdong.

Cao Cao wrote a letter to Sun Quan as follows: "Of late, I have been leading a punitive campaign in accordance with an imperial decree. Liu Cong surrendered when I led the imperial army to the south. Now, I have 800,000 naval troops under my command, and I wish to participate in a hunting expedition in Wu with you, General." Sun Quan summoned all his subjects for a meeting to discuss how to counter an impending invasion by Cao Cao. Many of them turned pale when he showed them the letter. (Note: (江表傳載曹公與權書曰：「近者奉辭伐罪，旄麾南指，劉琮束手。今治水軍八十萬衆，方與將軍會獵於吳。」權得書以示羣臣，莫不嚮震失色。) Jiang Biao Zhuan annotation in Sanguozhi vol. 47.) (Note: (其年九月，曹公入荊州，劉琮舉衆降，曹公得其水軍，船步兵數十萬，將士聞之皆恐。 ... 權延見羣下，問以計策。) Sanguozhi vol. 54.)

Some of Sun Quan's followers suggested to surrender to Cao Cao on the grounds that the strength of their armed forces was not comparable to Cao Cao's. (Note: (議者咸曰：「曹公豺虎也，然託名漢相，挾天子以征四方，動以朝廷為辭，今日拒之，事更不順。且將軍大勢，可以拒操者，長江也。今操得荊州，掩有其地，劉表治水軍，蒙衝鬬艦，乃以千數，操悉浮以沿江，兼有步兵，水陸俱下，此為長江之險，已與我共之矣。而勢力衆寡，又不可論。愚謂大計不如迎之。」) Sanguozhi vol. 54.) Zhou Yu, however, had a different opinion and he said:

"No. Even though Cao Cao is the Imperial Chancellor in name, he's actually a villain who wants to usurp state power. General, with your brilliance and your father and brother's military prowess, you have carved out for yourself a domain in Jiangdong which stretches over thousands of li. Your soldiers are well-trained and capable, and you have heroes who are willing to serve under you. You should go to war and help the Han dynasty eliminate its threats. Cao Cao has thrust himself into the gates of death, so why should we surrender to him? General, please consider carefully. Assuming northern China has been pacified and Cao Cao has no internal threats, can he last long in battle, and can he compete with us in naval warfare? Now, the north is not completely peaceful; Ma Chao and Han Sui in Guanxi (west of Hangu Pass) remain as thorns in Cao Cao's flesh. Besides, the people of central China are used to fighting land battles and do not specialise in naval warfare, so can they still hope to compete with us, the people of Wuyue? Winter is approaching. Cao Cao's warhorses lack fodder, his army has travelled a long distance across central China, and his men will certainly fall sick because they aren't accustomed to the changes in the climate. He has made four serious mistakes in military strategy, but he still persists in his ways. General, you will be able to capture Cao Cao soon. I ask for 30,000 elite troops to be stationed at Xiakou, and I assure you, General, that I will defeat the enemy." (Note: (瑜曰：「不然。操雖託名漢相，其實漢賊也。將軍以神武雄才，兼仗父兄之烈，割據江東，地方數千里，兵精足用，英雄樂業，尚當橫行天下，為漢家除殘去穢。況操自送死，而可迎之邪？請為將軍籌之：今使北土已安，操無內憂，能曠日持乆來爭疆場，又能與我校勝負於船楫可乎？今北土旣未平安，加馬超、韓遂尚在關西，為操後患。且舍鞌馬，杖舟楫，與吳越爭衡，本非中國所長。又今盛寒，馬無槀草，驅中國士衆遠涉江湖之閒，不習水土，必生疾病。此數四者，用兵之患也，而操皆冒行之。將軍禽操，宜在今日。瑜請得精兵三萬人，進住夏口，保為將軍破之。」) Sanguozhi vol. 54.)

Sun Quan replied: "The old villain has harboured the intention of usurping the Han dynasty for a long time, but he feared the two Yuans (Yuan Shao and Yuan Shu), Lü Bu, Liu Biao and me. Now, all the others have been destroyed and I am the only one left. The old villain and I cannot coexist together. Your idea of going to war coincides closely with my thoughts. This is a sign that Heaven has granted you to me." (Note: (權曰：「老賊欲廢漢自立乆矣，徒忌二袁、呂布、劉表與孤耳。今數雄已滅，惟孤尚存，孤與老賊，勢不兩立。君言當擊，甚與孤合，此天以君授孤也。」) Sanguozhi vol. 54.) He then drew his sword, slashed the table in front of him and said: "Any of you who dares to speak of surrendering to Cao Cao shall end up like this table!" (Note: (江表傳曰：權拔刀斫前奏案曰：「諸將吏敢復有言當迎操者，與此案同！」) Jiang Biao Zhuan annotation in Sanguozhi vol. 54.)

Later that night, Zhou Yu came to see Sun Quan and said:

"This morning, those gentlemen became afraid when they read Cao Cao's letter because Cao said he had 800,000 land and marine troops. They didn't bother to assess whether (Cao Cao's claim) was true or not, and immediately advocated surrender. That was totally absurd. Now, based on my estimations, Cao Cao's forces from central China can't be more than 150,000 to 160,000, and they are already weary from travelling over long distances. Even though he has obtained Liu Biao's forces, their numbers can't be more than 70,000 to 80,000, and there is a significant number of them who are suspicious (of Cao Cao). Although Cao Cao has superiority in numbers, the troops under him are exhausted and disunited in spirit, so there is nothing to fear about him. We need only 50,000 elite troops to defeat him. General, please don't worry and stop hesitating." (Note: (及會罷之夜，瑜請見曰：「諸人徒見操書，言水步八十萬，而各恐懾，不復料其虛實，便開此議，甚無謂也。今以實校之，彼所將中國人，不過十五六萬，且軍已久疲，所得表衆，亦極七八萬耳，尚懷狐疑。夫以疲病之卒，御狐疑之衆，衆數雖多，甚未足畏。得精兵五萬，自足制之，願將軍勿慮。」) Jiang Biao Zhuan annotation in Sanguozhi vol. 54.)

Sun Quan placed his hand on Zhou Yu's shoulder and replied:

"Gongjin, what you have said is exactly what I am thinking of. People like Zibu and Yuanbiao (Note: "Yuanbiao" referred to Qin Song, whose courtesy name was actually "Wenbiao". There was an error in the historical record.) are only concerned about their families and their personal interests. They greatly disappoint me. Only you and Zijing share the same thoughts as me. Heaven has granted both of you as assistants to help me. It's not easy to raise 50,000 troops at one time, but I have already selected 30,000 men, and the boats, supplies and equipment are all ready. You, Zijing and Elder Cheng can go ahead with the army first. I'll provide backup by continuing to relocate manpower and send more supplies and equipment to you. If you can defeat Cao Cao, that will be good. But if you suffer any setback, you can return to me and join me as I engage Cao Cao in a final battle." (Note: (權撫背曰：「公瑾，卿言至此，甚合孤心。子布、元表諸人，各顧妻子，挾持私慮，深失所望，獨卿與子敬與孤同耳，此天以卿二人贊孤也。五萬兵難卒合，已選三萬人，船糧戰具俱辦，卿與子敬、程公便在前發，孤當續發人衆，多載資糧，為卿後援。卿能辦之者誠決，邂逅不如意，便還就孤，孤當與孟德決之。」) Jiang Biao Zhuan annotation in Sanguozhi vol. 54.)

Pei Songzhi, who annotated Zhou Yu's biography in the Sanguozhi, argued that Lu Su was actually the first person who urged Sun Quan to resist Cao Cao. Zhou Yu was at Poyang County before Sun Quan held the discussion with his subjects, and Lu Su suggested to Sun Quan to summon Zhou Yu back for the meeting. Zhou Yu and Lu Su gave similar advice to Sun Quan, which resulted in Sun Quan arriving at his decision to go to war with Cao Cao. Pei Songzhi argued that it was unfair to Lu Su because Zhou Yu's biography gave full credit to Zhou Yu for being the only person to urge Sun Quan to resist Cao Cao, and failed to mention that Lu Su had already urged Sun Quan to resist Cao Cao before Zhou Yu did. (Note: (臣松之以為建計拒曹公，實始魯肅。于時周瑜使鄱陽，肅勸權呼瑜，瑜使鄱陽還，但與肅闇同，故能共成大勳。本傳直云，權延見羣下，問以計策，瑜擺衆人之議，獨言抗拒之計，了不云肅先有謀，殆為攘肅之善也。) Pei Songzhi's annotation in Sanguozhi vol. 54.)

=== Battle of Red Cliffs ===
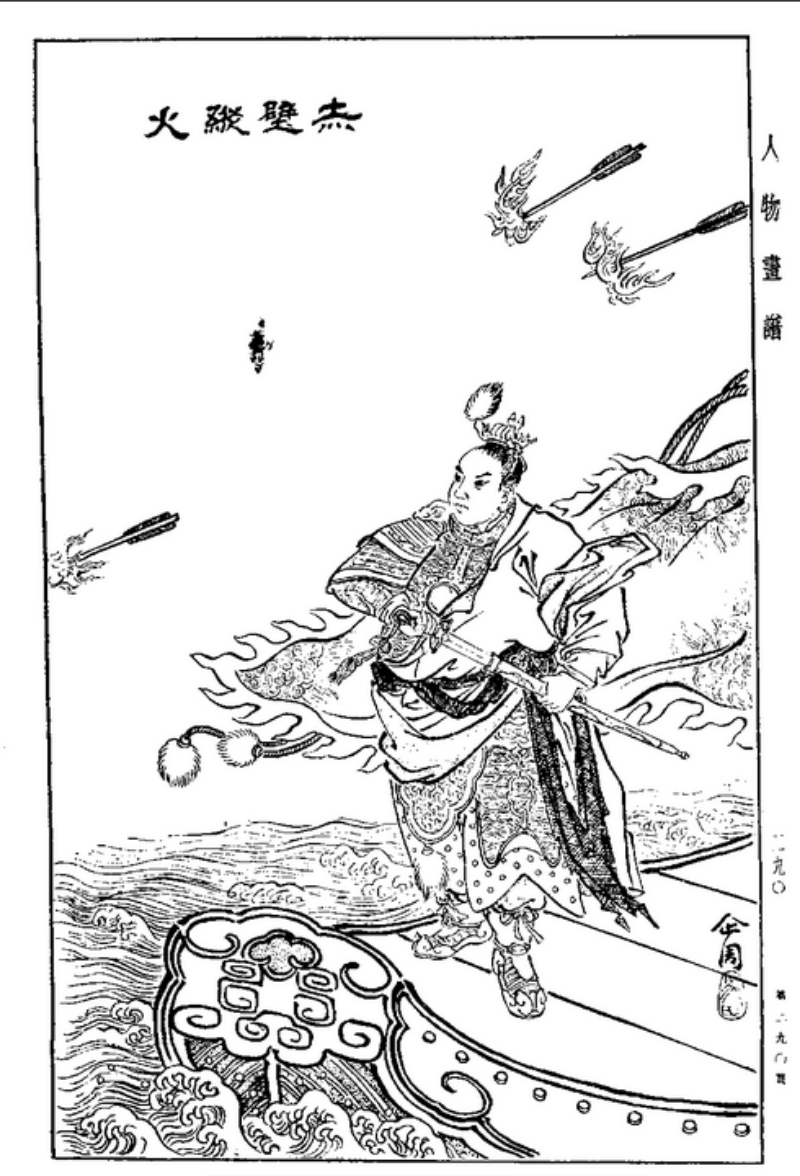
Zhou Yu

Around the time, Liu Bei had recently been defeated by Cao Cao at the Battle of Changban, and he planned to lead his followers south across the Yangtze River. Liu Bei met Lu Su at Dangyang, where they discussed the formation of an alliance between Liu Bei and Sun Quan. Liu Bei then moved to Xiakou (夏口; present-day Hankou, Hubei) and garrisoned there. At the same time, he also sent his adviser Zhuge Liang to accompany Lu Su to meet Sun Quan and discuss a Sun–Liu alliance. Sun Quan ordered Zhou Yu and Cheng Pu to lead his forces to join Liu Bei in resisting Cao Cao, and they rendezvoused at Red Cliffs (赤壁). A plague had broken out in Cao Cao's army, so Cao Cao lost to the allied forces in an early skirmish between both sides. Cao Cao then moved his camp to the northern bank of the Yangtze River while the allies remained at the south. (Note: (時劉備為曹公所破，欲引南渡江，與魯肅遇於當陽，遂共圖計，因進住夏口，遣諸葛亮詣權，權遂遣瑜及程普等與備并力逆曹公，遇於赤壁。時曹公軍衆已有疾病，初一交戰，公軍敗退，引次江北。瑜等在南岸。) Sanguozhi vol. 54.)

Huang Gai, one of Sun Quan's generals, told Zhou Yu: "The enemy are superior in numbers in comparison with our side. I fear that we cannot last long. However, I observe that Cao Cao's ships are linked to each other. We can destroy them by fire." Huang Gai then prepared about ten mengchongs and doujians (鬬艦; a type of warship) and filled them with the ingredients necessary for starting a fire. He also wrote a letter to Cao Cao, pretending that he wanted to surrender and defect to Cao Cao's side. (Note: (瑜部將黃蓋曰：「今寇衆我寡，難與持乆。然觀操軍船艦首尾相接，可燒而走也。」乃取蒙衝鬬艦數十艘，實以薪草，膏油灌其中，裹以帷幕，上建牙旗，先書報曹公，欺以欲降。) Sanguozhi vol. 54.) (Note: (江表傳載蓋書曰：「蓋受孫氏厚恩，常為將帥，見遇不薄。然顧天下事有大勢，用江東六郡山越之人，以當中國百萬之衆，衆寡不敵，海內所共見也。東方將吏，無有愚智，皆知其不可，惟周瑜、魯肅偏懷淺戇，意未解耳。今日歸命，是其實計。瑜所督領，自易摧破。交鋒之日，蓋為前部，當因事變化，效命在近。」曹公特見行人，密問之，口勑曰：「但恐汝詐耳。蓋若信實，當授爵賞，超於前後也。」) Jiang Biao Zhuan annotation in Sanguozhi vol. 54.)

Huang Gai then prepared some zouges (走舸; a smaller type of boat), which would follow behind the mengchongs and doujians, and his small fleet sailed towards Cao Cao's base. The wind was blowing strongly from the southeast. When Huang Gai's fleet reached the middle of the river, the ships all raised their sails, and Huang Gai lifted a torch and instructed his men to shout "We surrender!" Cao Cao's troops came out of the camp to look and they said Huang Gai was coming to join them. When Huang Gai was about 20 li away from the enemy base, he ordered his men to set the ships on fire and they boarded the smaller boats behind. As the wind was very strong, the flaming ships sailed towards Cao Cao's warships at fast speed and caused them to catch fire as well. Cao Cao's ships were all burnt down and the flames also spread quickly to his camps on land. Zhou Yu then ordered an attack on Cao Cao's base and scored a major victory. Cao Cao retreated north with his surviving troops after his defeat. (Note: See also Huang Gai#Battle of Red Cliffs for more details.) (Note: (江表傳曰：至戰日，蓋先取輕利艦十舫，載燥荻枯柴積其中，灌以魚膏，赤幔覆之，建旌旗龍幡於艦上。時東南風急，因以十艦最著前，中江舉帆，蓋舉火白諸校，使衆兵齊聲大叫曰：「降焉！」操軍人皆出營立觀。去北軍二里餘，同時發火，火烈風猛，往船如箭，飛埃絕爛，燒盡北船，延及岸邊營柴。瑜等率輕銳尋繼其後，雷鼓大進，北軍大壞，曹公退走。) Jiang Biao Zhuan annotation in Sanguozhi vol. 54.) Zhou Yu and Liu Bei led their respective forces in pursuit of Cao Cao, (Note: (又豫備走舸，各繫大船後，因引次俱前。曹公軍吏士皆延頸觀望，指言蓋降。蓋放諸船，同時發火。時風盛猛，悉延燒岸上營落。頃之，煙炎張天，人馬燒溺死者甚衆，軍遂敗退，還保南郡。 ... 備與瑜等復共追。) Sanguozhi vol. 54.) but Cao had already fled. (Note: (山陽公載記曰：公船艦為備所燒，引軍從華容道步歸，遇泥濘，道不通，天又大風，悉使羸兵負草填之，騎乃得過。羸兵為人馬所蹈藉，陷泥中，死者甚眾。軍既得出，公大喜，諸將問之，公曰：「劉備，吾儔也。但得計少晚；向使早放火，吾徒無類矣。」備尋亦放火而無所及。) Shanyang Gong Zaiji annotation in Sanguozhi vol. 1.)

=== Battles of Jiangling ===
After his defeat at Red Cliffs, Cao Cao returned to Xu (許; present-day Xuchang, Henan) and left Cao Ren and others behind to defend Jiangling County, the capital of Nan Commandery (南郡). Zhou Yu and Cheng Pu led their troops towards Nan Commandery and were separated from Cao Ren's forces by the river. (Note: (曹公留曹仁等守江陵城，徑自北歸。 ... 瑜與程普又進南郡，與仁相對，各隔大江。) Sanguozhi vol. 54.) Liu Bei told Zhou Yu: "Cao Ren is defending Jiangling and he has much supplies in the city. He poses a big threat to us. I will send Zhang Yide with 1,000 men to accompany you, while you dispatch 2,000 troops to follow me. We will then cross the Xia River (夏水; a tributary of the Yangtze River starting from southeast of Shashi District and ending at north of Jianli County in Hubei) and attack Cao Ren's rear. When Cao Ren hears that we have infiltrated his rear, he will definitely retreat." Zhou Yu agreed to Liu Bei's suggestion. (Note: (吳錄曰：備謂瑜云：「仁守江陵城，城中糧多，足為疾害。使張益德將千人隨卿，卿分二千人追我，相為從夏水入截仁後，仁聞吾入必走。」瑜以二千人益之。) Wu Lu annotation in Sanguozhi vol. 54.)

Zhou Yu later ordered Gan Ning to station at Yiling (夷陵; present-day Yichang, Hubei). Cao Ren sent a separate cavalry force to besiege Yiling, so Gan Ning sent an urgent request to Zhou Yu for reinforcements. (Note: See Battle of Yiling (208) for details on this separate battle.) Zhou Yu followed Lü Meng's advice and left Ling Tong to defend his current position while leading Lü Meng and others to help Gan Ning. After the siege at Yiling was lifted, Zhou Yu and his troops crossed the Yangtze River and attacked Jiangling, with Zhou personally participating in battle. He was hit on his right side by a stray arrow and had to retreat due to the severity of the wound. When Cao Ren heard that Zhou Yu was wounded and bedridden, he led his troops to outside Zhou Yu's camp and taunted the Wu troops. Zhou Yu got out of bed and personally inspected his men and encouraged them to raise their morale. Cao Ren saw that and retreated. (Note: (兵未交鋒，瑜即遣甘寧前據夷陵。仁分兵騎別攻圍寧。寧告急於瑜。瑜用呂蒙計，留凌統以守其後，身與蒙上救寧。寧圍旣解，乃渡屯北岸，克期大戰。瑜親跨馬擽陣，會流矢中右脅，瘡甚，便還。後仁聞瑜卧未起，勒兵就陣。瑜乃自興，案行軍營，激揚吏士，仁由是遂退。) Sanguozhi vol. 54.)

By 209, Zhou Yu and Cao Ren had held up against each other for over a year and both sides had sustained heavy casualties. Cao Cao could no longer afford the continuous losses in personnel and materiel, so he ordered Cao Ren to withdraw from Jiangling. (Note: (十四年，瑜、仁相守歲餘，所殺傷甚衆。仁委城走。) Sanguozhi vol. 47.)

=== Advice to Sun Quan on how to deal with Liu Bei ===
After the victory at the Battle of Jiangling, Sun Quan appointed Zhou Yu as a Lieutenant-General (偏將軍) and the Administrator (太守) of Nan Commandery (南郡). Zhou Yu's headquarters were at Jiangling County while he was in charge of Xiajun (下雋), Hanchang (漢昌), Liuyang (瀏陽) and Zhouling (州陵) counties. (Note: (權拜瑜偏將軍，領南郡太守。以下雋、漢昌、瀏陽、州陵為奉邑，屯據江陵。) Sanguozhi vol. 54.)

Liu Bei assumed the appointment of Governor (牧) of Jing Province with his administrative centre at Gong'an County. When Liu Bei later met Sun Quan at Jing (京; present-day Zhenjiang, Jiangsu), (Note: (劉備以左將軍領荊州牧，治公安。備詣京見權， ...) Sanguozhi vol. 54.) Zhou Yu wrote to Sun Quan:

"Liu Bei possesses characteristics of a fierce and ambitious hero. Besides, he also has under him generals with the might of bears and tigers, such as Guan Yu and Zhang Fei. He is definitely not someone who will remain subservient to another lord. I suggest moving Liu Bei to Wu Commandery, build a palace for him there, and present him with women and gifts to entertain him. We shall then put the two men (Guan Yu and Zhang Fei) each in a different location. If I can use Liu Bei as a hostage and attack (his men) at the same time, our goal (take over Jing Province) will be accomplished. And now yet we carve out land for them as resources, and allow the three men to be together? I am afraid that once the dragon encounters clouds and rain, it will no longer be content to remain in a pond." (Note: (... 瑜上疏曰：「劉備以梟雄之姿，而有關羽、張飛熊虎之將，必非乆屈為人用者。愚謂大計宜徙備置吳，盛為築宮室，多其美女玩好，以娛其耳目，分此二人，各置一方，使如瑜者得挾與攻戰，大事可定也。今猥割土地以資業之，聚此三人，俱在疆場，恐蛟龍得雲雨，終非池中物也。」) Sanguozhi vol. 54.)

Sun Quan considered that Cao Cao was still a threat in the north, so he thought it would be better for him to have more allies instead of creating hostility between him and Liu Bei. Besides, he was also worried that Liu Bei's men might not submit to him, so he rejected Zhou Yu's idea. (Note: (權以曹公在北方，當廣擥英雄，又恐備難卒制，故不納。) Sanguozhi vol. 54.)

== Death ==
Around 210, Liu Zhang was serving as the governor of Yi Province (covering present-day Sichuan and Chongqing), and he faced the threat of his rival Zhang Lu in Hanzhong Commandery. Zhou Yu went to see Sun Quan and proposed: "Cao Cao is still recovering from his defeats and he faces internal threats, so he will not go to war with you any time soon. I seek your permission to let me and Sun Yu lead an army to invade Shu (Yi Province) and attack Zhang Lu after that. Sun Yu will then remain behind to defend the conquered territories and form an alliance with Ma Chao. I will join you in attacking Cao Cao at Xiangyang, and together we can conquer the north." Sun Quan agreed. (Note: (是時劉璋為益州牧，外有張魯寇侵，瑜乃詣京見權曰：「今曹操新折衂，方憂在腹心，未能與將軍道兵相事也。乞與奮威俱進取蜀，得蜀而并張魯，因留奮威固守其地，好與馬超結援。瑜還與將軍據襄陽以蹙操，北方可圖也。」權許之。) Sanguozhi vol. 54.)

Zhou Yu then headed back to Jiangling County to make preparations for the campaign. However, he died of illness at Baqiu (巴丘; present-day Yueyang, Hunan) on the way back. He was 36 years old (by East Asian age reckoning) at the time of his death. (Note: Pei Songzhi noted that the "Baqiu" where Zhou Yu died was not the same place as the "Baqiu" where Zhou Yu was stationed at between 198 and 199. See the last sentence in this section.) (Note: (臣松之案，瑜欲取蜀，還江陵治嚴，所卒之處，應在今之巴陵，與前所鎮巴丘，名同處異也。) Pei Songzhi's annotation in Sanguozhi vol. 54.)

Before Zhou Yu's death, he recommended Lu Su to Sun Quan to be his successor. (Note: See Lu Su#Succeeding Zhou Yu for details.)

Sun Quan deeply mourned Zhou Yu's death. He shed tears and said: "Gongjin possessed the calibre of a talented adviser to a ruler. Now that he has died at such a young age, who can I still rely on?" (Note: (及卒，權流涕曰：「公瑾有王佐之資，今忽短命，孤何賴哉！」) Jiang Biao Zhuan annotation in Sanguozhi vol. 54.) He even wore plain garments to express his sorrow, which touched many people. After a funeral was held for Zhou Yu at Baqiu, his body was transported back to Wu Commandery (around present-day Suzhou, Jiangsu). Sun Quan received the procession at Wuhu and personally paid for all the expenses. He also issued an order allowing Zhou Yu's family to keep retainers. (Note: (權素服舉哀，感慟左右。喪當還吳，又迎之蕪湖，衆事費度，一為供給。後著令曰：「故將軍周瑜、程普，其有人客，皆不得問。」) Sanguozhi vol. 54.)

In 229, nearly two decades after Zhou Yu's death, when Sun Quan declared himself the emperor of the state of Eastern Wu, he told his subjects: "I wouldn't have become an emperor today if there wasn't Zhou Gongjin to assist me." (Note: (後權稱尊號，謂公卿曰：「孤非周公瑾，不帝矣。」) Jiang Biao Zhuan annotation in Sanguozhi vol. 54.)

== Family ==
Sometime between 198 and 199, Zhou Yu joined Sun Ce in the conquest of Wan (皖; present-day Qianshan County, Anhui). In Wan, they met a certain Elder Qiao (橋公), who had two daughters who were famed for their beautiful looks. Sun Ce married the elder sister while Zhou Yu married the younger one. (Note: (瑜時年二十四，吳中皆呼為周郎。以瑜恩信著於廬江，出備牛渚，後領春穀長。頃之，策欲取荊州，以瑜為中護軍，領江夏太守，從攻皖，拔之。時得橋公兩女，皆國色也。策自納大橋，瑜納小橋。) Sanguozhi vol. 54.) Sun Ce joked with Zhou Yu: "Although Elder Qiao's daughters are exceptionally beautiful, with us as their husbands, it should be a happy enough match" (because Sun Ce and Zhou Yu were both known for being handsome youths). (Note: (江表傳曰：策從容戲瑜曰：「橋公二女雖流離，得吾二人作壻，亦足為歡。」) Jiang Biao Zhuan annotation in Sanguozhi vol. 54.)

Zhou Yu had two sons and a daughter. (Note: (瑜兩男一女。) Sanguozhi vol. 54.) It is unknown if his three children were born to his wife Xiao Qiao.

Zhou Yu's daughter, Lady Zhou, married Sun Quan's eldest son Sun Deng, who was designated as the crown prince after his father became the emperor of Eastern Wu, in 225. (Note: (女配太子登。) Sanguozhi vol. 54.) (Note: (黄武四年，权为太子登娉周瑜女...) Sanguozhi, vol.53. This record was listed in Cheng Bing's biography, as Cheng was the official (Minister of Ceremonies) who welcomed Lady Zhou to Wu. (秉守太常，迎妃于吴...)) Sun Deng later died at the age of 32, preceding his father.

Zhou Yu's elder son, Zhou Xun (周循), resembled his father in personality, but died very early. He married Sun Quan's daughter Sun Luban and served as a Cavalry Commandant (騎都尉) in Eastern Wu. (Note: (男循尚公主，拜騎都尉，有瑜風，早卒。) Sanguozhi vol. 54.) (Note: (吳主權步夫人， ... 生二女，長曰魯班，字大虎，前配周瑜子循， ...) Sanguozhi vol. 50.)

Zhou Yu's younger son, Zhou Yin (周胤), married a woman from Sun Quan's clan. He served as the Commandant of Xingye (興業都尉) and was placed in command of 1,000 troops and garrisoned at Gong'an County. In 229, after Sun Quan became emperor, he granted Zhou Yin the title of a Marquis of a Chief District (都鄉侯). Zhou Yin was exiled to Luling Commandery (廬陵郡; around present-day Ji'an, Jiangxi) later for committing an offence. In 239, Zhuge Jin and Bu Zhi wrote a memorial to Sun Quan, requesting for Zhou Yin to be pardoned and restored of his marquis title and appointment on account of his father's contributions. Sun Quan was reluctant to do so, as he noted the severity of Zhou Yin's offence and said that Zhou Yin had not shown any sign of remorse. However, after much urging from Zhuge Jin, Bu Zhi, Zhu Ran and Quan Cong, Sun Quan eventually agreed, but Zhou Yin had died of illness in exile around the time when the pardon was issued. (Note: (循弟胤，初拜興業都尉，妻以宗女，授兵千人，屯公安。黃龍元年，封都鄉侯，後以罪徙廬陵郡。赤烏二年，諸葛瑾、步隲連名上疏曰：「故將軍周瑜子胤， ... 亦何患乎！」瑾、隲表比上，朱然及全琮亦俱陳乞，權乃許之。會胤病死。) Sanguozhi vol. 54.)

Zhou Jun (周峻), the son of Zhou Yu's elder brother, was appointed as a Lieutenant-General (偏將軍) and placed in command of 1,000 men by Sun Quan because of his uncle's meritorious service. After Zhou Jun died, Quan Cong requested for Sun Quan to commission Zhou Jun's son, Zhou Hu (周護), as a military officer but Sun declined. Sun Quan replied, "In the past, we managed to defeat Cao Cao and obtain Jing Province because of Gongjin's efforts. I have never forgotten his contributions. When I heard of Zhou Jun's death, I intended to recruit Zhou Hu into the civil service, but I have also heard that Zhou Hu is ruthless and treacherous in his ways. I was worried he will cause trouble if he is given an official appointment so I decided to not recruit him. My memories of Gongjin are lasting. How can I ever stop missing him?" (Note: (瑜兄子峻，亦以瑜元功為偏將軍，領吏士千人。峻卒，全琮表峻子護為將。權曰：「昔走曹操，拓有荊州，皆是公瑾，常不忘之。初聞峻亡，仍欲用護，聞護性行危險，用之適為作禍，故便止之。孤念公瑾，豈有已乎？」) Sanguozhi vol. 54.)

== Personal life ==
Zhou Yu was described to have strong physique and handsome looks. (Note: (瑜長壯有姿貌。) Sanguozhi vol. 54.) When Zhou Yu became close friends with Sun Ce, Sun Ce's mother Lady Wu told Sun Ce's younger brother Sun Quan to treat Zhou Yu like an elder brother. After Sun Quan succeeded Sun Ce, his subordinates did not observe the full protocol when they paid their respects to him. Zhou Yu was the only and the first person to follow all the formalities and etiquette when he paid respect to Sun Quan. (Note: (初瑜見友於策，太妃又使權以兄奉之。是時權位為將軍，諸將賔客為禮尚簡，而瑜獨先盡敬，便執臣節。) Sanguozhi vol. 54.)

Zhou Yu was known to be a magnanimous and generous man who won the hearts of many people with his character. However, there was one person he could not get along well with – Cheng Pu. (Note: (性度恢廓，大率為得人，惟與程普不睦。) Sanguozhi vol. 54.) Cheng Pu was much older than Zhou Yu, and he often insulted and belittled the latter, but Zhou Yu tolerated him. Cheng Pu was so impressed with Zhou Yu that he eventually changed his attitude towards Zhou Yu and treated him respectfully. He even remarked: "Being with Zhou Gongjin is like drinking the finest of wines. You get carried away and become drunk before even realizing it." (Note: (江表傳曰：普頗以年長數陵侮瑜。瑜折節容下，終不與校。普後自敬服而親重之，乃告人曰：「與周公瑾交，若飲醇醪，不覺自醉。」時人以其謙讓服人如此。) Jiang Biao Zhuan annotation in Sanguozhi vol. 54.)

Sometime early in Zhou Yu's career, Cao Cao heard of Zhou's talent and wanted to recruit Zhou Yu to serve under him, so he sent Jiang Gan to persuade Zhou Yu to defect to his side. However, Zhou Yu indirectly affirmed his loyalty to Sun Quan in front of Jiang Gan, and hinted to Jiang Gan that he cannot be persuaded to switch his allegiance. When Jiang Gan later returned to Cao Cao, he told Cao Cao that "Zhou Yu's magnanimity was too great to be described in words". (Note: See the article on Jiang Gan for details.) (Note: (初曹公聞瑜年少有美才，謂可游說動也，乃密下揚州，遣九江蔣幹往見瑜。 ... 幹還，稱瑜雅量高致，非言辭所間。) Jiang Biao Zhuan annotation in Sanguozhi vol. 54.)

Around 209, after visiting Sun Quan at Jing (京; present-day Zhenjiang, Jiangsu), Liu Bei was on his journey back to Jing Province when Sun Quan, along with Zhang Zhao, Qin Song, Lu Su and others, rushed to catch up with Liu Bei to see him off. Sun Quan then held a farewell banquet for Liu Bei. After the feast, the others left while only Liu Bei and Sun Quan remained behind. When they spoke of Zhou Yu, Liu Bei said: "Gongjin's talents and abilities are far greater than those of thousands of others. He possesses great ambitions and he may not be willing to remain subordinate for long." In another incident, after his defeat at the hands of Zhou Yu at the Battle of Red Cliffs, Cao Cao remarked: "I am not ashamed of having lost the battle." He later wrote to Sun Quan: "At the Battle of Red Cliffs, my men were affected by a plague, so I burnt my warships and retreated of my own accord. That resulted in Zhou Yu claiming the glory (of winning the battle)." Zhou Yu's widespread fame incurred much jealousy towards him, which was why Cao Cao and Liu Bei attempted to slander him and sow discord between him and Sun Quan. (Note: (中州之士，亦以此多之。劉備之自京還也，權乘飛雲大船，與張昭、秦松、魯肅等十餘人共追送之，大宴會敘別。昭、肅等先出，權獨與備留語，因言次，歎瑜曰：「公瑾文武籌略，萬人之英，顧其器量廣大，恐不乆為人臣耳。」 ... 瑜之破魏軍也，曹公曰：「孤不羞走。」後書與權曰：「赤壁之役，值有疾病，孤燒船自退，橫使周瑜虛獲此名。」 ... 瑜威聲遠著，故曹公、劉備咸欲疑譖之。) Jiang Biao Zhuan annotation in Sanguozhi vol. 54.)

Zhou Yu was known to be very learned in music from a young age. Even after three rounds of drinking at a banquet, he could still detect a mistake or a wrong note when a musical piece was being played. When that happened, he would look up at the musician. There was a saying at that time to describe this: "If there is a problem with the tune, Zhou Yu will look up." (Note: (瑜少精意於音樂，雖三爵之後，其有闕誤，瑜必知之，知之必顧，故時人謠曰：「曲有誤，周郎顧。」) Sanguozhi vol. 54.)

== Image ==
=== Romance of the Three Kingdoms ===
Zhou Yu is featured as a major character in the 14th-century historical novel Romance of the Three Kingdoms, which romanticises the historical events before and during the Three Kingdoms period. The novel fabricated the rivalry between him and Zhuge Liang. Zhou Yu is depicted to be extremely jealous of Zhuge Liang's talent and relentlessly attempt to outwit the latter on several occasions but never succeeds. His roles in the events leading to, and during the Battle of Red Cliffs, are largely overshadowed by Zhuge Liang's. Furthermore, his death is heavily dramatised in the novel and intentionally triggered by Zhuge Liang. Zhou Yu sustains an arrow wound at the Battle of Jiangling against Cao Ren's forces, and his condition deteriorates after Zhuge Liang makes him angry by foiling his plans on three occasions later. On the third time, Zhou Yu coughs blood and dies.

See the following for some fictitious stories in Romance of the Three Kingdoms involving Zhou Yu:

- List of fictitious stories in Romance of the Three Kingdoms#Zhuge Liang's diplomatic mission to Jiangdong
- Jiang Gan#In fiction
- List of fictitious stories in Romance of the Three Kingdoms#Borrowing arrows with straw boats
- Huang Gai#In fiction
- List of fictitious stories in Romance of the Three Kingdoms#Zhuge Liang prays for the eastern wind
- List of fictitious stories in Romance of the Three Kingdoms#Liu Bei and Lady Sun's marriage
- List of fictitious stories in Romance of the Three Kingdoms#Zhou Yu's death

=== Chinese opera ===
In Chinese opera, Zhou Yu is cast as a xiaosheng (小生; young character) or wusheng (武生; character in military dress), even when he appears together with Zhuge Liang, who was actually younger than he was. In Kun opera, Zhou Yu appears as a zhiweisheng, as in the scene The Swaying Reeds, in which Zhang Fei captured him but released him later.

=== Film and television ===
Notable actors who have portrayed Zhou Yu in film and television include Hong Yuzhou (Romance of the Three Kingdoms), Tony Leung (Red Cliff), and Victor Huang (Three Kingdoms).

The anime Ikki Tousen and Koutetsu Sangokushi make references to Zhou Yu, in which he is known by his Japanese name "Shuuyu Koukin".

=== Games ===
Zhou Yu is a playable character in Koei's Dynasty Warriors and Warriors Orochi video game series. He also appears in Koei's Romance of the Three Kingdoms strategy game series and in Capcom's Destiny of an Emperor as an enemy general.

In the collectible card game Magic: The Gathering there is a card named "Zhou Yu, Chief Commander" in the Portal Three Kingdoms set.

Zhou Yu appears in Fate/Samurai Remnant as a servant of the Archer class, voiced by Japanese voice actor Kensho Ono.

=== Others ===
Zhou Yu is sometimes known as "Zhou the Beautiful Youth" (meizhoulang 美周郎), which does not appear in the Records or the 14th-century historical novel Romance of the Three Kingdoms. Some Japanese writers such as Fumihiko Koide believe that this was a later invention by Japanese storytellers such as Eiji Yoshikawa.

== See also ==
- Lists of people of the Three Kingdoms
