= Two Qiaos =

Two 3rd-century Qiao family sisters

Da Qiao 大橋
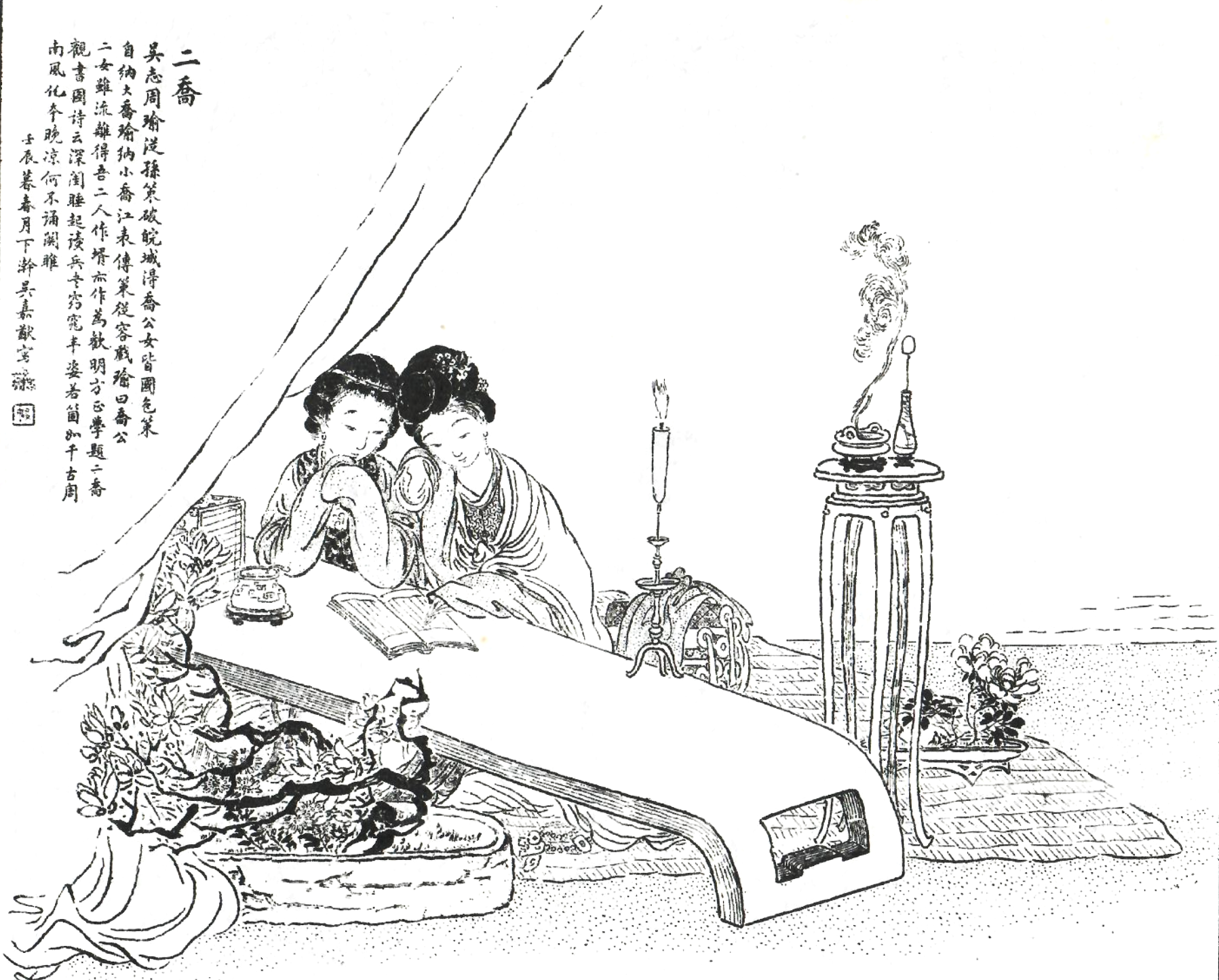
- A Qing dynasty block print of Da Qiao and Xiao Qiao
- Born: Unknown
- Died: Unknown
- Spouse: Sun Ce
- Father: Lord Qiao
- Relatives: Xiao Qiao (sister)

Xiao Qiao 小橋
- Born: Unknown
- Died: Unknown
- Spouse: Zhou Yu
- Father: Lord Qiao
- Relatives: Da Qiao (sister)

Two Qiaos

Da Qiao
- Traditional Chinese: 大橋
- Simplified Chinese: 大桥
- Literal meaning: Older Qiao
Transcriptions
Standard Mandarin
- Hanyu Pinyin: Dà Qiáo
- Wade–Giles: Ta Ch'iao

Xiao Qiao
- Traditional Chinese: 小橋
- Simplified Chinese: 小桥
- Literal meaning: Younger Qiao
Transcriptions
Standard Mandarin
- Hanyu Pinyin: Xiǎo Qiáo
- Wade–Giles: Hsiao Ch'iao

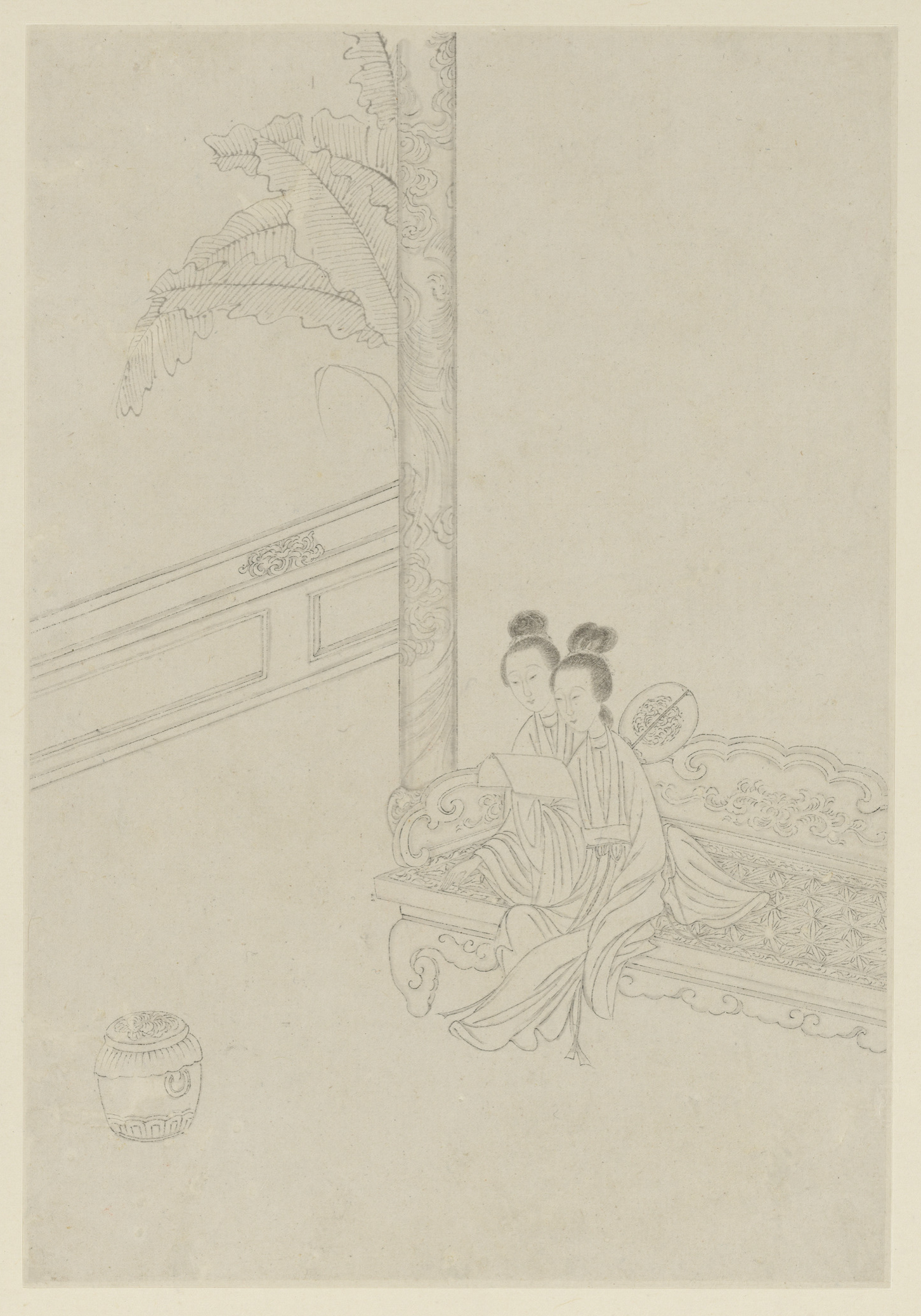
The two Qiaos, as painted by Gai Qi, 1799

The Two Qiaos of Jiangdong (traditional Chinese: 江東二喬; simplified Chinese: 江东二乔; pinyin: Jiāngdōng èr Qiáo) were two sisters of the Qiao family who lived during the late Eastern Han dynasty of China. In the novel Romance of the Three Kingdoms, the two Qiaos were sisters of exceptional beauty who were the pivot to the Battle of Chibi, one of the most impactful battles of the pre-Three Kingdoms period. Cao Cao, Chancellor of the Eastern Han dynasty, was depicted in the novel to be interested in having the two sisters, to the point that his intentions were evident in his son's poem "Ode to the Bronze Sparrow Platform" (銅雀臺賦); consequently leading Zhou Yu of Jiangdong to go to war with Cao Cao.

== In historical records ==
The Qiao sisters' names were not recorded in history, so in later times they are simply referred to as Da Qiao (literally "older Qiao") and Xiao Qiao (literally "younger Qiao"). They were from Wan County (皖縣), Lujiang Commandery (廬江郡), which is in present-day Anqing, Anhui. Da Qiao married the warlord Sun Ce, who established the foundation of the state of Eastern Wu during the Three Kingdoms period. Xiao Qiao married Zhou Yu, a general who served under Sun Ce and later, under his successor, Sun Quan. Sun Ce jokingly told Zhou Yu: "Although Elder Qiao's daughters are exceptionally beautiful, with us as their husbands, it should be a happy enough match."

Zhou Yu had two sons and a daughter, Zhou Xun, Zhou Yin and Zhou Fei (Lady Zhou). It is unknown if his three children were born to Xiao Qiao.

== In Romance of the Three Kingdoms ==
The Qiao sisters are featured as characters in the 14th-century historical novel, Romance of the Three Kingdoms, which romanticises the historical events before and during the Three Kingdoms period. In the novel, the Chinese character for "Qiao" in their names, 橋/桥, is replaced with 喬/乔.

In the novel, the Qiao sisters are the daughters of a certain Qiao Guolao (喬國老; literally "State Elder Qiao"), possibly referring to Qiao Xuan. Zhou Yu's biography in the third-century historical text, Records of the Three Kingdoms, did not mention the name of the Qiao sisters' father, who was simply referred to as Qiao Gong (橋公; literally "Elder Qiao" or "Lord Qiao"). Historically, Qiao Xuan died in 184, while the Qiao sisters married Sun Ce and Zhou Yu around 199, so it was not possible that Qiao Xuan was still living when the marriages took place. Therefore, it is highly unlikely that Qiao Xuan was the "Qiao Gong" mentioned in Zhou Yu's biography.

In Chapter 44 of the novel, Zhuge Liang tells Zhou Yu that Cao Cao's desire to have the Two Qiaos for himself is evident in "Ode to the Bronze Sparrow Platform" (銅雀臺賦), a historical poem written by Cao Cao's son, Cao Zhi. Zhuge Liang recites an altered version of the poem with added verses:

立雙臺於左右兮
有玉龍與金鳳
攬二喬於東南兮
樂朝夕之與共
俯皇都之宏麗兮
瞰雲霞之浮動
欣群才之來萃兮
協飛熊之吉夢

Translation:

The two towers rise, one on either flank,
This named Golden Phoenix, that Jade Dragon.
He would have the two Qiaos, these beautiful ladies of Wu,
That he might rejoice with them morning and evening.
Look down; there is the grand beauty of an imperial city,
And the rolling vapors lie floating beneath.
He will rejoice in the multitude of scholars that assemble,
Answering to the felicitous dream of King Wen.

— translated by C.H. Brewitt-Taylor

An enraged Zhou Yu then hardens his decision to convince Sun Quan to ally with Liu Bei against Cao Cao, then prevailing over the latter in the Battle of Chibi. Historically, the battle predates the terrace by two years, and Cao Zhi's poem was written two years after Zhou Yu's death. Nonetheless, the story of the Bronze Bird Terrace and the Qiao sisters in the popular tradition aroused people's imagination for generations.

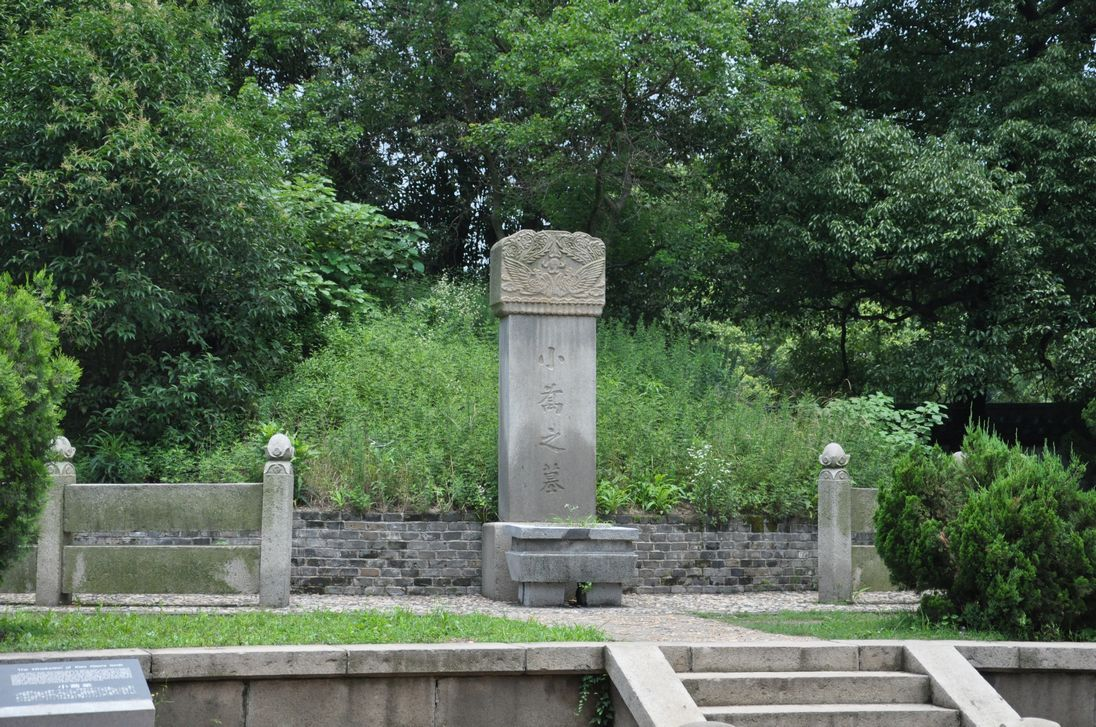
Younger Qiao's alleged tomb in Yueyang, Hunan, China.

== In Chinese opera ==
The 1960 opera Fenghuang Er Qiao (鳳凰二喬) addresses Xiao Qiao as "Qiao Jing" (喬靚) and Da Qiao as "Qiao Wan" (喬婉), and depicts both as skilled in martial arts. Sun Ce, the protagonist of this opera, borrows 3,000 troops from Yuan Shu and allies with the Qiao army, which is led by the Two Qiaos. The Qiao's father starts a competition for Zhou Yu and Sun Ce to prove they are worthy of marrying them, where the Qiao sisters engage in battles with their future husbands. Sun Ce eventually gains Da Qiao's hand in marriage through a martial arts contest with the help of Zhou Yu and Xiao Qiao.

== In popular culture ==
=== Film and television ===
Taiwanese supermodel Lin Chi-ling starred as Xiao Qiao in the 2008 Chinese epic war film, Red Cliff, directed by John Woo. In the film, it is surmised that Cao Cao's infatuation with Xiao Qiao is the reason why he invaded Sun Quan's lands and initiated the battle. Chinese actress Huang Yi portrayed Xiao Qiao in Just Another Pandora's Box, a spoof of Red Cliff.

Cai Hancen and Tsai Yi-chen portrayed Da Qiao and Xiao Qiao, respectively, in the 2009 Taiwanese television series, K.O.3an Guo, a spoof of Romance of the Three Kingdoms in a modern high school setting.

Chinese actresses Liu Jing and Zhao Ke portrayed Da Qiao and Xiao Qiao, respectively, in the 2010 Chinese television series, Three Kingdoms.

=== Games ===
The Qiao sisters are featured as playable characters in Koei's Dynasty Warriors and Warriors Orochi video game series. The anime Koihime Musō and Ikki Tousen make references to Da Qiao and Xiao Qiao as well, in which they are known by their respective names in Japanese – Daikyō and Shōkyō.

The Two Qiaos are featured in Sega's Total War: Three Kingdoms after 19 March 2020, when the developer Creative Assembly released a DLC under the title of A World Betrayed, which gives the Two Qiao official portraits and 3D models with unique abilities. They are also featured in the game Honour of Kings, a Chinese multiplayer online battle arena game, as separate heroes, alongside Liu Bei, Cao Cao, Sun Ce, Zhou Yu, etc.

The Qiaos are featured as "gods" in the Japanese mobile game Puzzle & Dragons, as part of the Three Kingdoms God series.

== See also ==
- Eastern Wu family trees#Sun Ce
- Lists of people of the Three Kingdoms
