= Jiang Gan =

Early 3rd century Eastern Han dynasty scholar

Jiang Gan 蔣幹
- Born: Unknown; Anhui
- Died: Unknown
- Other name: Ziyi (子翼)
- Occupations: Scholar, debater

Jiang Gan (fl. 209), courtesy name Ziyi, was a debater and scholar who lived during the late Eastern Han dynasty of China. He is best known for his attempt to persuade Zhou Yu, a general serving under the warlord Sun Quan, to defect to Sun Quan's rival Cao Cao after the Battle of Red Cliffs in the winter of 208–209. In the 14th-century historical novel Romance of the Three Kingdoms, the entire incident not only takes place before the battle, but is also heavily dramatised and exaggerated.

== In historical records ==
The only extant historical source about Jiang Gan's life is the Jiang Biao Zhuan (江表傳). In the fifth century, Pei Songzhi added excerpts from the Jiang Biao Zhuan in his annotated version of the third-century historical text Records of the Three Kingdoms (Sanguozhi) by Chen Shou.

Jiang Gan was from Jiujiang Commandery (九江郡; covering parts of present-day Anhui around the Huai River region), which is not to be confused with the modern city of Jiujiang in Jiangxi Province. He was good-looking and was known for being an excellent debater in the Jiangnan and Huai River regions.

In 209, after the Battle of Red Cliffs, Cao Cao heard of Zhou Yu's talent and hoped to recruit Zhou Yu to serve under him, so he secretly travelled to Yang Province and sent Jiang Gan to persuade Zhou Yu to join him. Jiang Gan dressed simply and carried his luggage by himself when he went to meet Zhou Yu.

Zhou Yu personally welcomed Jiang Gan and told him: "Ziyi, you tried hard. You travelled all the way here just to be a spokesman for (Cao) Cao?" Jiang Gan replied: "I am an old friend of yours but we have not been in contact for years. When I heard you have become famous now, I travelled here to visit you and reminisce our past days, as well as to tour the region. Are you questioning my intentions when you called me a 'spokesman'?" Zhou Yu said: "I may not be as good as the musicians of ancient times, but I still know how to appreciate a beautiful piece of music." Zhou Yu then invited Jiang Gan to dine with him. After the meal, before he left, Zhou Yu told Jiang Gan: "I have something confidential to attend to, and I need to leave now. I will treat you to another meal again after I am done."

Three days later, Zhou Yu brought Jiang Gan on a tour of his camp, including his granaries and armouries. After that, Zhou Yu invited Jiang Gan to a feast. He instructed the servants to bring out some expensive items to show Jiang Gan. He told Jiang Gan: "In his life, when a man meets a lord who truly appreciates him, he should fulfil his duty as a subject and forge a close relationship with his lord. He should follow his lord's orders faithfully and share weal and woe together with his lord. Even if Su Qin, Zhang Yi and Li Yiji were to return from the dead, they won't be able to affect his loyalty towards his lord. So, how can you ever hope to make someone switch his allegiance?" (Note: Su Qin and Zhang Yi were famous political strategists who lived in the Warring States period, and were known to be very persuasive speakers who succeeded in convincing rulers to form or break alliances with other states. Li Yiji was an adviser to Liu Bang (the founding emperor of the Han dynasty) and was also known to be an excellent lobbyist. Zhou Yu was indirectly affirming his allegiance towards the Sun family and hinting to Jiang Gan that he cannot be persuaded to defect to Cao Cao's side.) Jiang Gan laughed but did not respond to what Zhou Yu said.

When Jiang Gan returned from his trip, he praised Zhou Yu in front of Cao Cao and said that Zhou Yu's magnanimity was too great to be described in words.

== In Romance of the Three Kingdoms ==
Jiang Gan appears as a minor character in the 14th-century historical novel Romance of the Three Kingdoms, which romanticises the historical events before and during the Three Kingdoms period. He appears in chapters 45 and 47 (Note: See Pang Tong#In Romance of the Three Kingdoms for the story in Chapter 47.) during the events leading to the Battle of Red Cliffs and commits two major blunders which are instrumental to Cao Cao's defeat in the battle.

In Chapter 45, Jiang Gan volunteers to persuade Zhou Yu to surrender to Cao Cao and travels to Zhou Yu's camp. Zhou Yu knows Jiang Gan's true purpose of the visit, so he tricks Jiang Gan into believing that two of Cao Cao's naval commanders (Cai Mao and Zhang Yun) are planning to assassinate their lord and defect to his side. Jiang Gan also gets hold of a letter apparently written by Cai Mao and Zhang Yun to Zhou Yu, in which they claimed that they will kill Cao Cao soon and present his head to Zhou Yu. He then steals the letter while Zhou Yu is asleep, returns to Cao Cao's camp, and shows Cao Cao the letter. The letter is actually a fake letter written by Zhou Yu. Cao Cao falls for the ruse and orders Cai Mao and Zhang Yun to be executed. He realises his folly later but it is too late already.

Later, in Chapter 47, Cao Cao sends Jiang Gan to spy on Zhou Yu again. When Jiang Gan shows up, Zhou Yu pretends to be angry at him for stealing the letter earlier and orders his men to deny Jiang Gan entry into his camp. Jiang Gan wanders around and meets Pang Tong in a nearby temple by chance, without knowing that Pang Tong has been expecting him. He escapes and brings Pang Tong back with him to meet Cao Cao. Pang Tong gives fake advice to Cao Cao by suggesting that he uses metal chains to link his warships together to reduce the chances of his troops falling seasick. The chained-linked ships later become vulnerable to the fire attack during the Battle of Red Cliffs.

== See also ==
- Lists of people of the Three Kingdoms
