= Wei Zhao (Eastern Wu) =

Eastern Wu scholar, historian and official (204–273)

- 韋昭

Junior State Historian (左國史)
- In office ?–?
- Monarch: Sun Hao

Palace Attendant
- In office ?–?
- Monarch: Sun Hao

Supervisor of the Central Secretariat (中書僕射)
- In office 264 or after – ?
- Monarch: Sun Hao

Erudite Libationer (博士祭酒)
- In office ?–?
- Monarch: Sun Xiu

Prefect of the Grand Clerks (太史令)
- In office ?–?
- Monarch: Sun Liang

Personal details
- Born: 201 or 204 Danyang, Jiangsu
- Died: 273 (aged 69 or 72)
- Resting place: East Street, Yanling Town, Danyang, Jiangsu
- Children: Wei Long
- Occupation: Official, historian, scholar
- Courtesy name: Hongsi (弘嗣)
- Other name: Wei Yao (韋曜)
- Peerage: Village Marquis of Gaoling (高陵亭侯)

Wei Zhao (204–273), courtesy name Hongsi, was an official, historian, and scholar of the state of Eastern Wu during the Three Kingdoms period of China. He shared the same personal name as Sima Zhao (司馬昭), father of Emperor Wu, the founder of the Jin dynasty. In order to avoid naming taboo, the historian Chen Shou changed Wei Zhao's personal name to "Yao (矅)" when he wrote Wei Zhao's biography in the Sanguozhi, the authoritative source for the history of the Three Kingdoms period.

== Life ==
Wei Zhao was appointed as the first Erudite Libationer (博士祭酒; i.e. President) of the precursor to the Imperial Nanking University by the third Wu emperor, Sun Xiu, in 258. He was the chief editor of the Book of Wu, an official history of Wu. While he was compiling the Book of Wu, the fourth Wu emperor Sun Hao attempted to force him to rewrite certain portions of the book, but Wei Zhao refused on the grounds that such amendments would infringe the principle of history. Wei Zhao's insistence on producing a historically accurate Book of Wu resulted in his execution by Sun Hao. Wei Zhao also wrote several other works, such as Annotations to Guoyu (國語注) and Argument and Interpretation of Names (辯釋名).

Wei Zhao's tomb is located near East Street, Yanling Town in Danyang, Jiangsu. The Wei Zhao Temple (韋昭祠), a memorial to him along with his former residence, is also located near there.

== See also ==
- Lists of people of the Three Kingdoms
- Hua He, co-author for Book of Wu
