= Qin Song =

Early 3rd century advisor to warlord Sun Quan

Qin Song 秦松
- Born: Unknown; Jiangsu
- Died: Unknown
- Other names: Wenbiao (文表)
- Occupation: Politician

Qin Song (fl. 190s–200s), courtesy name Wenbiao, was a Chinese politician serving under the warlord Sun Quan during the late Eastern Han dynasty of China. He previously served under Sun Ce, Sun Quan's elder brother and predecessor.

== Life ==
Qin Song was from Guangling Commandery, which is around present-day Huai'an, Jiangsu. Sometime around the late 190s, Qin Song, along with Zhang Zhao, Zhang Hong and Chen Duan (陳端), pledged allegiance to the warlord Sun Ce, who had recently conquered the territories in the Jiangdong region. Qin Song became an adviser to Sun Ce.

Qin Song continued serving under Sun Quan after Sun Ce's death in the year 200. Around 208, before the Battle of Red Cliffs, Sun Quan called for a meeting with all his subjects to discuss how to deal with an impending invasion by a rival warlord, Cao Cao. Qin Song, Zhang Zhao and many others urged Sun Quan to surrender to Cao Cao because they believed that they stood no chance against Cao Cao in a war. Sun Quan did not want to surrender to Cao Cao, and he hardened his decision to go to war with Cao Cao after Lu Su and Zhou Yu convinced him to do so. He privately told Zhou Yu that he was very disappointed with Zhang Zhao and Qin Song for urging him to surrender to Cao Cao, because he felt that they were more concerned about protecting their families and personal interests than about his well-being.

== See also ==
- Lists of people of the Three Kingdoms
