= Juchao District =

Former district in Anhui Province, China

Coordinates: 31°40′42″N 117°44′07″E

Juchao District (simplified Chinese: 居巢区; traditional Chinese: 居巢區; pinyin: Jūcháo Qū) was a district in Anhui Province, People's Republic of China, under the jurisdiction of Chaohu City. It has a population of 859,000 and an area of 2,063 square kilometres (797 sq mi). The government of Chaohu City is located in the Juchao District.

Juchao District has jurisdiction over five subdistricts, fifteen towns and two townships.

On August 22, 2011, Anhui province government announced that Chaohu was split into three parts and was absorbed by neighboring cities. Juchao District was renamed to Chaohu as a county-level city under Hefei's administration.
