= Battle of Jiangxia =

Battle between warlords Sun Quan and Liu Biao (208)

- Part of the wars at the end of the Han dynasty
Date	Spring of 208 CE
Location	Jiangxia Commandery
Result	Decisive Sun Quan victory; death of Huang Zu; Jiangxia brought under temporary Sun family protection

Belligerents
Sun Quan	Liu Biao

Commanders and leaders
Zhou Yu; Lü Meng; Ling Tong; Dong Xi	Huang Zu †; Chen Jiu †; Zhang Shuo †

Strength
25,000	30,000+

Casualties and losses
	30,000

Battle of Jiangxia
- Traditional Chinese: 江夏之戰
- Simplified Chinese: 江夏之战
Transcriptions
Standard Mandarin
- Hanyu Pinyin: Jiāngxià Zhī Zhàn

The Battle of Jiangxia was fought between the warlords Sun Quan and Liu Biao in 208 in the late Eastern Han dynasty. The battle was the last part of a series of military engagements between Sun Quan and Liu Biao's general Huang Zu in Jiangxia Commandery (present-day eastern Hubei). The battle ended in a decisive victory for Sun Quan and his forces.

== Background ==
In the spring of 208, Gan Ning, who defected from Huang Zu to Sun Quan's side, suggested to his new lord to prepare a full assault on Jiangxia. Gan Ning mentioned that Huang Zu was already old, and his right-hand men only knew how to do business and bully lower-ranked officials, and Huang's arsenal had not been replenished for some time.

Despite opposition from his chief civil clerk, Zhang Zhao, Sun Quan still appointed Ling Tong to lead the vanguard force, Lü Meng to be the naval commandant, and Zhou Yu as Front Commander to regulate the operation. The campaign had two main objectives: elimination of Huang Zu, who was responsible for the death of Sun Quan's father Sun Jian at the Battle of Xiangyang; and conquest of Jiangxia, which stood in Sun Quan's path to dominating Jing Province (covering present-day Hubei and Hunan).

== The battle ==
=== Initial clashes ===
In response to Sun Quan's aggression, Huang Zu assigned his general Zhang Shuo as the vanguard, and Chen Jiu as the admiral, but he would stay behind the high walls of Jiangxia to avoid conflict in the frontline. Before the battle started, Zhang Shuo led his troop on a large vessel to reconnoitre the riverbank, but was located by Ling Tong, who was also scouting the area. At the time, Ling Tong only had tens of his closest warriors on a light vessel, yet he was able to climb Zhang Shuo's vessel probably under the cover of nightfall or the disguise as Zhang's own men, and surprised his enemy. Zhang Shuo was slain by Ling Tong, and his mariners were captured.

=== Deadlock ===
Upon hearing the news that Zhang Shuo had been killed, Huang Zu immediately ordered Chen Jiu to block the entrance of Miankou River with two of his largest capital ships (mengchong) covered with ox-hide at the choke point. In addition, Huang had strong men and archers positioned on top of the cliff next to the river to throw down rocks and fire on large enemy vessels. To bring down Huang Zu's mengchongs, Zhou Yu sent out his large vessels, but they were blocked by the rocks thrown down from the cliff. After several hours of fighting, Zhou Yu realized that he could not advance against the heavy crossfire from the mengchongs.

=== Fall of the great capital ships ===
To change the tide of battle, Zhou Yu had Ling Tong and Dong Xi, along with 100 "die-hard" soldiers, don two suits of armour each and charge towards the enemy despite the crossfire. Through fierce fighting, Ling and Dong finally succeeded in breaking the connections between the two vessels, and the downfall of the mengchongs inspired the fighting spirit of Sun Quan's forces. Lü Meng even participated in melee combat, and killed Chen Jiu in a duel. With the admiral gone, Huang Zu's massive navy was annihilated by Sun Quan's smaller forces. Meanwhile, Ling Tong, Dong Xi and others led a separate command to capture Jiangxia and massacring his population, achieving this before the naval victory.

=== Doom of Huang Zu ===
Unable to resist Sun Quan's forces, Huang Zu fled the city, but was caught up and killed by a horseman named Feng Ze. His head was specifically requested by Sun Quan to be placed inside a container for examination. After receiving Huang Zu's head, Sun Quan presented it as a sacrifice at his late father Sun Jian's temple.

== Aftermath ==
=== Conflict between Ling Tong and Gan Ning ===
With Huang Zu killed, Sun Quan had taken his revenge; however, Ling Tong's father, Ling Cao, was killed by an arrow fired by Gan Ning during the previous Battle of Xiakou, and had not been avenged. Thus, Ling Tong would attempt to provoke Gan Ning during a banquet held in Lü Meng's house some time later. In the end, Sun Quan settled this conflict by "exiling" Gan Ning to Half Island, which Ling Tong perceived as fair.

=== Abandonment of Jiangxia ===
Liu Biao's son Liu Qi wanted to succeed Huang Zu's position, and went east after Sun Quan took away the captives. However, Liu Qi was not allowed the time to solidify his control over Jiangxia because northern Jing Province had been incorporated into Cao Cao's domain without much resistance after his father died of illness. Therefore, Liu Qi stationed his troop at Han Ford, where he met Liu Bei, who was escaping from Cao Cao's pursuit, they then joined forces and went to Xiakou to ask help from Sun Quan. As Jiangxia was famous for being the cradle of the Huang clan, Sun Quan gave up on holding on to the city after he received news that Cao Cao had acquired northern Jing Province. Liu Biao's general Wen Ping, who defected to Cao Cao after Liu's death, became the new governor of Jiangxia.
