= Lü Meng =

Chinese general and politician (178–220)

- 呂蒙
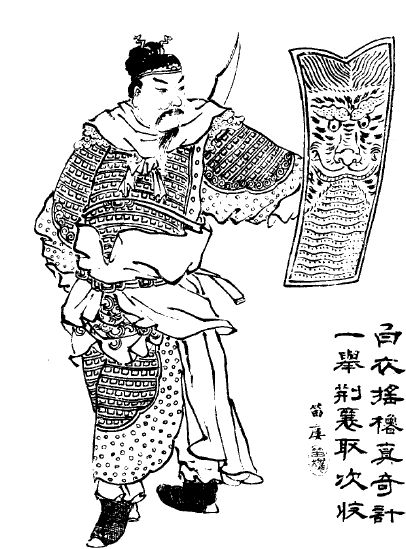
- A Qing dynasty illustration of Lü Meng (1888)

Administrator of Nan Commandery (南郡太守)
- In office 219 – January or February 220

Administrator of Hanchang (漢昌太守)
- In office 217 – 219

General of Tiger's Might (虎威將軍)
- In office 217 – January or February 220

Left Protector of the Army (左護軍)
- In office 217 – January or February 220

Administrator of Lujiang (廬江太守)
- In office 214 – 217

Prefect of Xunyang (尋陽令)
- In office 209 – ?

Lieutenant-General (偏將軍)
- In office 209 – ?

General of the Household Who Sweeps Across the Wilderness (橫野中郎將)
- In office 208 – 209

Chief of Guangde (廣德長)
- In office ?–?

Commandant Who Pacifies the North (平北都尉)
- In office ?–?

Personal details
- Born: 178 (Note: Lü Meng's biography in the Sanguozhi recorded that he died of illness at the age of 42 (by East Asian age reckoning). (Note: (年四十二，遂卒於內殿。) Sanguozhi vol. 54.) The Zizhi Tongjian provided more details by stating that he died in the 12th month of the 24th year of the Jian'an era of the reign of Emperor Xian of Han. This month corresponds to 23 January to 21 February 220 in the Gregorian calendar. Since Lü Meng was 41 when he died, his year of birth should be 178.) Funan County, Anhui
- Died: January or February 220 (aged 41) Gong'an County, Hubei
- Children: Lü Cong; Lü Ba; Lü Mu
- Occupation: Military general, politician
- Courtesy name: Ziming (子明)
- Peerage: Marquis of Chanling (孱陵侯)

Lü Meng (178 – January or February 220), courtesy name Ziming, was a Chinese military general and politician who served under the warlord Sun Quan during the late Eastern Han dynasty of China. Early in his career, he fought in several battles under the banner of Sun Ce, Sun Quan's elder brother and predecessor. Although he had been noted for his bravery, he was still deemed as nothing more than a "mere warrior" for his lack of literacy skills. Later, with encouragement from Sun Quan, Lü Meng took up scholarly pursuits to improve himself, gradually becoming a learned and competent military leader. In 217, he succeeded Lu Su as the frontline commander of Sun Quan's forces in Jing Province. Two years later, in a carefully calculated military operation, Lü Meng led an invasion of Liu Bei's territories in southern Jing Province, swiftly and stealthily capturing all the lands from Liu Bei's general Guan Yu, who was captured and executed after his defeat. Lü Meng enjoyed his finest hour after the victory but died a few months later because he was already seriously ill before the campaign.

== Early life ==
Lü Meng was from Fupo County (富陂縣), Runan Commandery (汝南郡), which is located southeast of present-day Funan County, Anhui. His family migrated to the south of the Yangtze River when Lü Meng was young. Lü Meng lived with his brother-in-law, Deng Dang (鄧當), who served as a military officer under Sun Ce. When he was 14 or 15, he secretly followed Deng Dang to the battles against the Shanyue tribes. Deng Dang was shocked to see his teenage brother-in-law in battle, so he scolded Lü Meng and warned him to stop. Lü Meng refused to listen so Deng Dang told Lü Meng's mother about this. When she wanted to punish him, Lü Meng said: "It is difficult to survive in poverty. If we can prove ourselves through hard work, then wealth will come eventually. How can we catch the tiger cub if we don't enter the tiger's den?" Lü Meng's mother sighed and let him have his way. (Note: (呂蒙字子明，汝南富陂人也。 ... 少南渡，依姊夫鄧當。當為孫策將，數討山越。蒙年十五六，竊隨當擊賊，當顧見大驚，呵叱不能禁止。歸以告蒙母，母恚欲罰之，蒙曰：「貧賤難可居，脫誤有功，富貴可致。且不探虎穴，安得虎子？」母哀而舍之。) Sanguozhi vol. 54.)

At the time, an official scorned Lü Meng because of his young age and often insulted him by saying things like: "What can he do? His behaviour will only result in him feeding himself to the tigers." Lü Meng killed the official one day when he lost control of his anger. Initially, he took shelter under Zheng Chang (鄭長) but later turned himself in to Yuan Xiong (袁雄), a colonel under Sun Ce. Yuan Xiong pleaded with his lord to spare Lü Meng's life. Sun Ce interviewed Lü Meng and was so impressed with him that he pardoned Lü Meng and appointed him as a close aide. (Note: (時當職吏以蒙年小輕之，曰：「彼豎子何能為？此欲以肉餧虎耳。」他日與蒙會，又蚩辱之。蒙大怒，引刀殺吏，出走，逃邑子鄭長家。出因校尉袁雄自首，承間為言，策召見奇之，引置左右。) Sanguozhi vol. 54.)

A few years later, after Deng Dang died, Zhang Zhao recommended Lü Meng to replace Deng Dang, so Lü Meng was appointed as a Major of a Separate Command (別部司馬). In the year 200, after Sun Ce was assassinated, his younger brother Sun Quan succeeded him as the warlord ruling the territories in the Jiangdong region. Sun Quan planned to reorganise his army by merging small units into larger garrisons. When Lü Meng heard about it, he collected funds to purchase elaborately designed armour for his troops. When Sun Quan came to inspect Lü Meng's unit, he was so impressed that he placed more soldiers under Lü Meng's command, thus saving Lü Meng's troops from being merged into another unit. (Note: (數歲，鄧當死，張昭薦蒙代當，拜別部司馬。權統事，料諸小將兵少而用薄者，欲并合之。蒙陰賒貰，為兵作絳衣行縢，及簡日，陳列赫然，兵人練習，權見之大恱，增其兵。) Sanguozhi vol. 54.)

Lü Meng participated in Sun Quan's conquest of Danyang Commandery (丹楊郡; around present-day Xuancheng, Anhui) and made many contributions in battle. He was promoted to Commandant Who Pacifies the North (平北都尉) and appointed as the Chief (長) of Guangde County. (Note: (從討丹楊，所向有功，拜平北都尉，領廣德長。) Sanguozhi vol. 54.)

== Battle of Jiangxia ==
In the spring of 208, Lü Meng was assigned to be the navy commandant when Sun Quan launched a campaign against Huang Zu, the Administrator (太守) of Jiangxia Commandery (present-day eastern Hubei). During the battle, Ling Tong and Dong Xi destroyed Huang Zu's two large mengchongs while Lü Meng's unit defeated Huang Zu's navy. Lü Meng killed Huang Zu's subordinate Chen Jiu (陳就) in the midst of battle. Huang Zu attempted to flee after learning of Chen Jiu's death, but was captured by Sun Quan's soldiers. After the battle, Sun Quan deemed Lü Meng's contributions to be the most significant because Chen Jiu's death secured their victory. Lü Meng was promoted to General of the Household Who Sweeps Across the Wilderness (橫野中郎將) and awarded 10 million coins. (Note: (從征黃祖，祖令都督陳就逆以水軍出戰。蒙勒前鋒，親梟就首，將士乘勝，進攻其城。祖聞就死，委城走，兵追禽之。權曰：「事之克，由陳就先獲也。」以蒙為橫野中郎將，賜錢千萬。) Sanguozhi vol. 54.)

== Red Cliffs campaign ==
In the winter of 208, Lü Meng participated in the Battle of Red Cliffs, in which the allied forces of Sun Quan and Liu Bei defeated the forces of the northern warlord Cao Cao at Wulin (烏林; in present-day Honghu, Hubei). Cao Cao perfunctorily retreated to northern China, leaving behind his general Cao Ren to defend Nan Commandery (南郡; around present-day Jingzhou, Hubei). Sun Quan's forces, led by Zhou Yu and Cheng Pu, pressed on their attack and besieged Cao Ren in Nan Commandery. (Note: (是歲，又與周瑜、程普等西破曹公於烏林，圍曹仁於南郡。) Sanguozhi vol. 54.)

Around the time, Xi Su (襲肅), a military officer from Yi Province (covering present-day Sichuan and Chongqing), brought along his men to defect to Sun Quan's side. Zhou Yu proposed to Sun Quan to let Lü Meng take charge of Xi Su's troops. However, Lü Meng praised Xi Su as a courageous person and declined to take over command of Xi Su's men. He believed it was disrespectful to do so because Xi Su had come a long way to join them. Sun Quan agreed with Lü Meng and returned Xi Su's troops to him. (Note: (益州將襲肅舉軍來附，瑜表以肅兵益蒙，蒙盛稱肅有膽用，且慕化遠來，於義宜益不宜奪也。權善其言，還肅兵。) Sanguozhi vol. 54.)

During the siege of Nan Commandery, Zhou Yu ordered Gan Ning to lead a detachment to take control of Yiling (夷陵; present-day Yichang, Hubei), but Gan Ning came under attack by a separate enemy force led by Cao Ren's subordinates. When Gan Ning sent a messenger to Zhou Yu's camp to request for relief forces, most of Sun Quan's officers saw that they did not have enough men to spare, so they refused to help Gan Ning. Lü Meng, however, insisted on saving Gan Ning. He told Zhou Yu and Cheng Pu: "I suggest we leave Ling Tong behind while I follow you to help Gan Ning. It is imperative that we lift the siege (on Gan Ning) because he may not be able to hold out for long. I assure you that Ling Tong can defend our current position for at least ten days."

Lü Meng also suggested to Zhou Yu to send 300 men to block the enemy's retreat route with huge logs. When the reinforcements arrived at Yiling, they killed over half of the total number of enemy troops and forced the surviving ones to retreat at night. However, the enemy encountered the huge logs and were unable to cross over on horseback, so they had to dismount and proceed on foot. Sun Quan's pursuing forces arrived at the blockade and seized about 300 horses left behind by the enemy, which they transported back to their camp on boats. The morale of Zhou Yu's army improved greatly, so they crossed the Yangtze River, set up a garrison near the enemy base, and then engaged Cao Ren's forces in battle. Cao Ren lost the battle and eventually ordered his troops to abandon their position and retreat. Sun Quan's forces captured Nan Commandery and gained control over central Jing Province (covering present-day Hubei and Hunan). Upon his return, Lü Meng was promoted to Lieutenant-General (偏將軍) and appointed as the Prefect (令) of Xunyang County (尋陽縣; southwest of present-day Huangmei County, Hubei). (Note: (瑜使甘寧前據夷陵，曹仁分衆攻寧，寧困急，使使請救。諸將以兵少不足分，蒙謂瑜、普曰：「留淩公績，蒙與君行，解圍釋急，勢亦不乆，蒙保公績能十日守也。」又說瑜分遣三百人柴斷險道，賊走可得其馬。瑜從之。軍到夷陵，即日交戰，所殺過半。敵夜遁去，行遇柴道，騎皆舍馬步走。兵追蹙擊，獲馬三百匹，方船載還。於是將士形勢自倍，乃渡江立屯，與相攻擊，曹仁退走，遂據南郡，撫定荊州。還，拜偏將軍，領尋陽令。) Sanguozhi vol. 54.)

== Scholarly pursuits ==
The Jiang Biao Zhuan (江表傳) recorded that Sun Quan once told Lü Meng and Jiang Qin: "Both of you are commanders now so you should enrich yourself with knowledge." Lü Meng replied: "I have many things to attend to in the army, so I am afraid I won't have time to read." Sun Quan then said: (Note: (江表傳曰：初，權謂蒙及蔣欽曰：「卿今並當塗掌事，宜學問以自開益。」蒙曰：「在軍中常苦多務，恐不容復讀書。」權曰： ...) Jiang Biao Zhuan annotation in Sanguozhi vol. 54.)

"I am not saying that I want you to take up Confucian studies and become a scholar-official. What I hope you can do is to spend a bit of time reading and understanding history. Do you have as many issues to handle as I do? When I was young, I read the Classic of Poetry, Book of Documents, Book of Rites, Zuo Zhuan and Guoyu, but not the Yijing. Since I succeeded my brother, I have been reading the Three Histories – Records of the Grand Historian, Book of Han and Dong Guan Han Ji – and many military texts, and they have enriched me. The two of you are open-minded and fast-learning, so you can definitely pick up reading. Do you really not want to? You should start with Sun Tzu's The Art of War, the Six Secret Teachings, Zuo Zhuan, Guoyu and the Three Histories. Confucius once said, 'You will gain nothing even if you give up on meals and sleep and keep thinking about something, so why don't you learn?' When Emperor Guangwu was busy with military affairs, he still found time to read. Mengde agrees he is already old but he never gives up on learning. Why don't you give some encouragement to yourselves?" (Note: (... 「孤豈欲卿治經為博士邪？但當令涉獵見往事耳。卿言多務孰若孤，孤少時歷詩、書、禮記、左傳、國語，惟不讀易。至統事以來，省三史、諸家兵書，自以為大有所益。如卿二人，意性朗悟，學必得之，寧當不為乎？宜急讀孫子、六韜、左傳、國語及三史。孔子言『終日不食，終夜不寢以思，無益，不如學也』。光武當兵馬之務，手不釋卷。孟德亦自謂老而好學。卿何獨不自勉勗邪？」) Jiang Biao Zhuan annotation in Sanguozhi vol. 54.)

Lü Meng was so inspired by Sun Quan's words that he began to study diligently and acquire more knowledge. He eventually surpassed some Confucian scholars in terms of the number of texts he read. (Note: (蒙始就學，篤志不倦，其所覽見，舊儒不勝。) Jiang Biao Zhuan annotation in Sanguozhi vol. 54.)

=== Meeting with Lu Su ===
In 210, after Lu Su succeeded Zhou Yu (who died of illness earlier that year) as the frontline commander of Sun Quan's forces, he passed by Lü Meng's garrison on his way to Lukou (陸口; at Lushui Lake near present-day Chibi, Hubei). Lu Su had all along regarded Lü Meng with contempt, but someone told him: "General Lü's fame and glory are increasing day by day. You shouldn't view him in the same light now as you did in the past. You should visit him soon." Lu Su then headed to Lü Meng's camp. After some drinks, Lü Meng asked Lu Su, "You have received an important appointment and you are going to be stationed near Guan Yu. Have you made any contingency plans to deal with unforeseen circumstances?" Lu Su lackadaisically replied, "I will adapt to the situation when the time comes." Lü Meng then said: "The east and the west may be one family now, but Guan Yu is a person with the might of bears and tigers. How can you not make preparations beforehand?" Lü Meng then proposed five strategies to Lu Su on how to deal with Guan Yu. Lu Su left his seat, came closer to Lü Meng, placed his hand on his shoulder and said, "Lü Ziming, I never knew you had such insights until I came here." He also visited Lü Meng's mother and became friends with Lü Meng. (Note: (魯肅代周瑜，當之陸口，過蒙屯下。肅意尚輕蒙，或說肅曰：「呂將軍功名日顯，不可以故意待也，君宜顧之。」遂往詣蒙。酒酣，蒙問肅曰：「君受重任，與關羽為鄰，將何計略，以備不虞？」肅造次應曰：「臨時施宜。」蒙曰：「今東西雖為一家，而關羽實熊虎也，計安可不豫定？」因為肅畫五策。肅於是越席就之，拊其背曰：「呂子明，吾不知卿才略所及乃至於此也。」遂拜蒙母，結友而別。) Sanguozhi vol. 54.)

=== Jiang Biao Zhuan account ===
The Jiang Biao Zhuan recorded a slightly different account of the meeting between Lu Su and Lü Meng. Lu Su placed his hand on Lü Meng's shoulder and said: "I heard you were previously a mere warrior. But now, you have taken up scholarly pursuits and you are no longer that Meng under Wu." Lü Meng replied: (Note: (後魯肅上代周瑜，過蒙言議，常欲受屈。肅拊蒙背曰：「吾謂大弟但有武略耳，至於今者，學識英博，非復吳下阿蒙。」) Jiang Biao Zhuan annotation in Sanguozhi vol. 54.)

"When scholars part ways for three days, they will see each other in a different light when they meet again later. Now, as you have succeeded Gongjin, your task will be difficult and you are also going to be neighbours with Guan Yu. Guan Yu is an avid learner and he is familiar with the Zuo Zhuan. He has a loud and confident voice, and a heroic aura around him. However, he is conceited and thinks highly of himself. Now that you are going to be his opponent, you should have some measures to counter him." (Note: (蒙曰：「士別三日，即更刮目相待。大兄今論，何一稱穰侯乎。兄今代公瑾，旣難為繼，且與關羽為鄰。斯人長而好學，讀左傳略皆上口，梗亮有雄氣，然性頗自負，好陵人。今與為對，當有單複以鄉待之。」) Jiang Biao Zhuan annotation in Sanguozhi vol. 54.)

He then presented three strategies to Lu Su on how to counter Guan Yu. Lu Su respected Lü Meng so he kept the strategies to himself and did not reveal them. (Note: (密為肅陳三策，肅敬受之，祕而不宣。) Jiang Biao Zhuan annotation in Sanguozhi vol. 54.)

The Chinese idioms "Ah Meng from Wu" (吳下阿蒙; 吴下阿蒙; wú xià ā méng) and "rub one's eyes and look" (刮目相看; guā mù xiāng kàn) originated from this conversation. The former is used to describe an unlearned person who achieves improvement through diligent study while the latter means to see a person in a different light, especially after the person has made remarkable improvement.

== Battles of Wan County and Ruxu ==
Cao Cao appointed Xie Qi (謝奇) as the Agricultural Officer (典農) of Qichun County and ordered him to station at Wan County (皖縣; present-day Qianshan County, Anhui) to harass the border of Sun Quan's domain. Lü Meng tried to induce Xie Qi into surrendering but failed, so he attacked Xie Qi. Xie Qi lost the battle and retreated. His subordinates, Sun Zicai (孫子才) and Song Hao (宋豪), brought along several civilians and surrendered to Lü Meng. (Note: (魏使廬江謝奇為蘄春典農，屯皖田鄉，數為邊寇。蒙使人誘之，不從，則伺隙襲擊，奇遂縮退，其部伍孫子才、宋豪等，皆攜負老弱，詣蒙降。) Sanguozhi vol. 54.)

In 213, Lü Meng followed Sun Quan to Ruxu (濡須; north of present-day Wuwei County, Anhui) to guard against Cao Cao's advances. Sun Quan wanted to construct a dock at Ruxu, but his subordinates said, "We should land on the other side of the river and attack the enemy, then return to our ships. Why build a dock?" However, Lü Meng supported the idea of building a dock and he said: "Battles are unpredictable and we might not always win. If we lose and the enemy closes in, and we don't have time to retreat to the riverbank, how can we even board our ships?" Sun Quan agreed with Lü Meng and had the dock constructed to make boardings and landings more convenient. With this, Sun Quan's army defended their positions against Cao Cao's approaching forces, who retreated after several failed attempts to overcome the enemy. (Note: (後從權拒曹公於濡須，數進奇計，又勸權夾水口立塢，所以備御甚精，曹公不能下而退。) Sanguozhi vol. 54.) (Note: (吳錄曰：權欲作塢，諸將皆曰：「上岸擊賊，洗足入船，何用塢為？」呂蒙曰：「兵有利鈍，戰無百勝，如有邂逅，敵步騎蹙人，不暇及水，其得入船乎？」權曰：「善。」遂作之。) Wu Lu annotation in Sanguozhi vol. 54.)

== Battle of Lujiang ==
Around 214, Cao Cao retreated from Ruxu, he appointed Zhu Guang (朱光) as the Administrator (太守) of Lujiang Commandery (廬江郡; around present-day Lujiang County, Anhui) and ordered him to station at Wan County (皖縣; present-day Qianshan County, Anhui). Zhu Guang developed the area for agricultural use, while bribing bandits from Poyang County to cause trouble in Sun Quan's territories. Lü Meng warned Sun Quan: "The lands in Wan County are very fertile so the enemy's numbers will rise after they gain a bountiful harvest. Within a few years time, Cao Cao's military prowess would have increased significantly, so we should eliminate them soon." Sun Quan heeded Lü Meng's advice and personally led a campaign to attack Lujiang Commandery. Before the battle, Sun Quan summoned all his officers and asked them for their opinions. (Note: (曹公遣朱光為廬江太守，屯皖，大開稻田，又令間人招誘鄱陽賊帥，使作內應。蒙曰：「皖田肥美，若一收孰，彼衆必增，如是數歲，操態見矣，宜早除之。」乃具陳其狀。於是權親征皖，引見諸將，問以計策。) Sanguozhi vol. 54.)

The officers suggested to pile up earth to form small hills and replenish their equipment. However, Lü Meng disagreed: "It will take several days to build the hills and replenish our equipment. By then, the enemy would have reinforced their defences and their relief forces would have arrived, and we can't defeat them. The rainwater has flowed in, and the water level will subside if we linger on for days. By then, it will be very difficult for our ships to retreat and we may be in danger. As of now, I observe that the fortress's defences are weak, so we can achieve victory if we attack it from all directions when our army's morale is still high. We can retreat via the water route after that. That's the way to secure total victory." Sun Quan heeded Lü Meng's suggestion. (Note: (吳書曰：諸將皆勸作土山，添攻具，蒙趨進曰：「治攻具及土山，必歷日乃成，城備旣脩，外救必至，不可圖也。且乘雨水以入，若留經日，水必向盡，還道艱難，蒙竊危之。今觀此城，不能甚固，以三軍銳氣，四面並攻，不移時可拔，及水以歸，全勝之道也。」權從之。) Wu Shu annotation in Sanguozhi vol. 54.)

Lü Meng recommended Gan Ning to lead the assault on Wan County while he followed behind with the elite troops. When they attacked at dawn, Lü Meng himself beat a war drum to boost the soldiers' morale. They captured the fortress by noon. Around the same time, Cao Cao's general Zhang Liao was leading reinforcements from Hefei to help Zhu Guang. When he reached Jiashi (夾石), he heard that Wan County had fallen to the enemy so he withdrew his troops. Sun Quan praised Lü Meng for his bravery and appointed him as the Administrator of Lujiang Commandery. Lü Meng gained 600 households from Xunyang County (尋陽縣; southwest of present-day Huangmei County, Hubei) for his tuntian system and had 30 more subordinates placed under his command. (Note: (蒙乃薦甘寧為升城督，督攻在前，蒙以精銳繼之。侵晨進攻，蒙手執枹鼓，士卒皆騰踊自升，食時破之。旣而張遼至夾石，聞城已拔，乃退。權嘉其功，即拜廬江太守，所得人馬皆分與之，別賜尋陽屯田六百戶，官屬三十人。) Sanguozhi vol. 54.)

When Lü Meng returned to Xunyang County, he heard that some bandits were causing trouble in Luling Commandery (廬陵郡; southwest of present-day Ji'an, Jiangxi), and that many of Sun Quan's officers had been unsuccessful in defeating the bandits. Sun Quan remarked: "A hundred birds of prey are not comparable to one osprey." He then ordered Lü Meng to attack the bandits. Lü Meng achieved success and killed the bandit chiefs but released the others and allowed them to revert to normal civilian life. (Note: (蒙還尋陽，未期而廬陵賊起，諸將討擊不能禽，權曰：「鷙鳥累百，不如一鶚。」復令蒙討之。蒙至，誅其首惡，餘皆釋放，復為平民。) Sanguozhi vol. 54.)

== Sun–Liu territorial dispute ==
Around 212, Sun Quan's ally Liu Bei embarked on a campaign to seize control of Yi Province (covering present-day Sichuan and Chongqing) from its governor, Liu Zhang. He left Guan Yu behind to defend his territories in southern Jing Province during his absence. After Liu Bei completely took over Yi Province in 214, Sun Quan perceived that he was "lending" territories in Jing Province to Liu Bei per an earlier agreement in 210 so he wanted the territories back because Liu Bei already had a new base in Yi Province. When Liu Bei refused, Sun Quan ordered Lü Meng to lead troops to seize three commanderies – Changsha (長沙), Lingling (零陵; around present-day Yongzhou, Hunan) and Guiyang (桂陽; around present-day Chenzhou, Hunan). (Note: (是時劉備令關羽鎮守，專有荊土，權命蒙西取長沙、零、桂三郡。) Sanguozhi vol. 54.)

Lü Meng wrote to the administrators of the three commanderies to ask them to submit to Sun Quan. They all agreed except Lingling's administrator, Hao Pu (郝普). Liu Bei returned to Jing Province when he heard of Lü Meng's advances and garrisoned troops at Gong'an County while ordering Guan Yu to lead an army to take back the three commanderies. At the time, Sun Quan was at Lukou (陸口; at Lushui Lake near present-day Chibi, Hubei) and he sent Lu Su to lead 10,000 troops to Yiyang to block Guan Yu. Sun Quan also sent an urgent order to Lü Meng, ordering him to give up on Lingling and lead his troops to Yiyang to assist Lu Su. (Note: (蒙移書二郡，望風歸服，惟零陵太守郝普城守不降。而備自蜀親至公安，遣羽爭三郡。權時住陸口，使魯肅將萬人屯益陽拒羽，而飛書召蒙，使捨零陵，急還助肅。) Sanguozhi vol. 54.)

When Lü Meng pacified Changsha, he passed by Ling County (酃縣; east of present-day Hengyang, Hunan) and met Deng Xuanzhi (鄧玄之), an old friend of Hao Pu. He planned to use Deng Xuanzhi to trick Hao Pu into surrendering. That night, Lü Meng summoned all his officers and gave them instructions on how to attack Lingling the following morning, without telling them that Sun Quan had given orders for them to give up on Lingling and move to Yiyang. He lied to Deng Xuanzhi that Liu Bei was besieged in Hanzhong by Cao Cao's general Xiahou Yuan and that Guan Yu was occupied in a battle at Nan Commandery. He then asked Deng Xuanzhi to help him persuade Hao Pu to give up on Lingling. Deng Xuanzhi went to see Hao Pu later and conveyed Lü Meng's message. Hao Pu became afraid when he heard that he had been isolated, so he agreed to surrender and asked Deng Xuanzhi to lead him to Lü Meng. When Lü Meng met Hao Pu, he revealed the truth, clapped his hands and laughed. Hao Pu became wrecked with guilt when he learnt that both Liu Bei and Guan Yu were actually free to reinforce Lingling but it was too late. Lü Meng left Sun He (孫河) behind to guard the three commanderies while he headed towards Yiyang per Sun Quan's order. (Note: (初，蒙旣定長沙，當之零陵，過酃，載南陽鄧玄之，玄之者郝普之舊也，欲令誘普。及被書當還，蒙祕之，夜召諸將，授以方略，晨當攻城，顧謂玄之曰：「郝子太聞世間有忠義事，亦欲為之，而不知時也。左將軍在漢中，為夏侯淵所圍。關羽在南郡，今至尊身自臨之。近者破樊本屯，救酃，逆為孫規所破。此皆目前之事，君所親見也。彼方首尾倒縣，救死不給，豈有餘力復營此哉？今吾士卒精銳，人思致命，至尊遣兵，相繼於道。今予以旦夕之命，待不可望之救，猶牛蹄中魚，兾賴江漢，其不可恃亦明矣。若子太必能一士卒之心，保孤城之守，尚能稽延旦夕，以待所歸者，可也。今吾計力度慮，而以攻此，曾不移日，而城必破，城破之後，身死何益於事，而令百歲老母戴白受誅，豈不痛哉？度此家不得外問，謂援可恃，故至於此耳。君可見之，為陳禍福。」玄之見普，具宣蒙意，普懼而聽之。玄之先出報蒙，普尋後當至。蒙豫勑四將，各選百人，普出，便入守城門。須臾普出，蒙迎執其手，與俱下船。語畢，出書示之，因拊手大笑，普見書，知備在公安，而羽在益陽，慙恨入地。蒙留孫河委以後事。即日引軍赴益陽。) Sanguozhi vol. 54.)

The territorial dispute between Sun Quan and Liu Bei was eventually resolved when both sides agreed to divide Jing Province between their respective domains along the Xiang River. Sun Quan released Hao Pu and returned Lingling Commandery to Liu Bei. Lü Meng received Xunyang (尋陽) and Yangxin (陽新) counties as his personal estate. (Note: (劉備請盟，權乃歸普等，割湘水，以零陵還之。以尋陽、陽新為蒙奉邑。) Sanguozhi vol. 54.)

== Battles of Xiaoyao Ford and Ruxu ==
In 215, after returning from Jing Province, Lü Meng joined Sun Quan in a campaign to conquer Hefei, which was defended by Cao Cao's general Zhang Liao. By 215, Sun Quan's forces had failed to breach Hefei's walls and had also sustained heavy casualties in the earlier engagements with the enemy. When a plague broke out in his army, Sun Quan decided to withdraw. While retreating, Sun Quan was caught up in a fierce counterattack by Zhang Liao, but managed to break out of the encirclement and reach safety when his officers, including Lü Meng, fought with their lives to protect their lord at all costs. (Note: (師還，遂征合肥，旣徹兵，為張遼等所襲，蒙與淩統以死扞衞。) Sanguozhi vol. 54.)

Later, in 217, Cao Cao personally led a large army to invade Sun Quan's garrison at Ruxu (濡須; north of present-day Wuwei County, Anhui). Sun Quan led his forces to resist the enemy and placed Lü Meng in charge of the army. Lü Meng arrived at the dock, which was constructed earlier in 213, and stationed thousands of archers there to rain arrows on the enemy when they approached. He also attacked the camp of Cao Cao's vanguard force before the enemy established a foothold and succeeding in destroying the camp. Cao Cao saw that he could not overcome Sun Quan and eventually retreated. Lü Meng was promoted to General of Tiger's Might (虎威將軍) and appointed as Left Protector of the Army (左護軍). (Note: (後曹公又大出濡須，權以蒙為督，據前所立塢，置彊弩萬張於其上，以拒曹公。曹公前鋒屯未就，蒙攻破之，曹公引退。拜蒙左護軍、虎威將軍。) Sanguozhi vol. 54.)

== Succeeding Lu Su ==
In 217, when Lu Su died, Lü Meng took over command of the former's troops, numbering over 10,000, and moved west to the garrison at Lukou (陸口; at Lushui Lake near present-day Chibi, Hubei). Lü Meng was also appointed as the Administrator (太守) of Hanchang Commandery (漢昌郡; southeast of present-day Pingjiang County, Hunan) and received Xiajun (下雋), Liuyang (劉陽), Hanchang and Zhouling (州陵) counties as his personal marquisate. He was stationed near the Sun-Liu border, which was guarded by Liu Bei's general Guan Yu on the other side. Lü Meng was aware of Guan Yu's military prowess and his intention of seizing Sun Quan's territories in Jing Province. He also knew that Guan Yu was in a strategic position on the upstream of the Yangtze River. He recognised that the temporary stability and truce between Sun Quan and Liu Bei would not last long. (Note: (魯肅卒，蒙西屯陸口，肅軍人馬萬餘盡以屬蒙。又拜漢昌太守，食下雋、劉陽、漢昌、州陵。與關羽分土接境，知羽驍雄，有并兼心，且居國上流，其勢難乆。) Sanguozhi vol. 54.)

Previously, Lu Su had advocated the maintenance of friendly relations between Sun Quan and Liu Bei to sustain their alliance against Cao Cao. Lü Meng wrote a secret letter to Sun Quan: (Note: (初，魯肅等以為曹公尚存，禍難始搆，宜相輔協，與之同仇，不可失也，蒙乃密陳計策曰： ...) Sanguozhi vol. 54.)

"You can order Sun Jiao to guard Nan Commandery, Pan Zhang to station at Baidicheng, and Jiang Qin to lead 10,000 marines to sail along the river and attack any enemy position. I will personally head to the frontline at Xiangyang. In this way, we will not need to worry about Cao Cao, nor rely on Guan Yu. Besides, Guan Yu and his lord are untrustworthy so you should not be too faithful towards them. Currently, the reason why Guan Yu does not advance east, based on your keen sense of judgment, is because of my existence. Now, we should attack him when our forces are still very powerful, because it will be more difficult to do so later." (Note: (... 「令征虜守南郡，潘璋住白帝，蔣欽將游兵萬人，循江上下，應敵所在，蒙為國家前據襄陽，如此，何憂於操，何賴於羽？且羽君臣，矜其詐力，所在反覆，不可以腹心待也。今羽所以未便東向者，以至尊聖明，蒙等尚存也。今不於彊壯時圖之，一旦僵仆，欲復陳力，其可得邪？」) Sanguozhi vol. 54.)

Sun Quan agreed with Lü Meng and wanted to accept his suggestion. Later, he sought Lü Meng's advice on attacking Cao Cao in Xu Province, to which Lü Meng replied: (Note: (權深納其策，又聊復與論取徐州意，蒙對曰： ...) Sanguozhi vol. 54.)

"Cao Cao is currently far away in Hebei. He has defeated the Yuans not too long ago and is still busy pacifying You and Ji provinces in northern China, so he will not focus on the east. The troops defending Xu Province are not a cause for concern because they can be easily overcome. However, the terrain there is very accessible by land and is suitable for the deployment of cavalry forces. Even if you manage to conquer Xu Province now, Cao Cao will definitely come to claim it back later. By then, even if we have 70,000 to 80,000 men to defend the province, we will still need to be worried. Why do we not attack Guan Yu instead? If we succeed, we will have the Yangtze River to our advantage and our prowess will increase significantly." (Note: (... 「今操遠在河北，新破諸袁，撫集幽、兾，未暇東顧。徐土守兵，聞不足言，往自可克。然地勢陸通，驍騎所騁，至尊今日得徐州，操後旬必來爭，雖以七八萬人守之，猶當懷憂。不如取羽，全據長江，形勢益張。」) Sanguozhi vol. 54.)

Sun Quan thought that Lü Meng's advice was appropriate so he heeded it. (Note: (權尤以此言為當。) Sanguozhi vol. 54.)

When Lü Meng was at Lukou, he treated his neighbours generously and maintained friendly ties with Guan Yu. (Note: (及蒙代肅，初至陸口，外倍脩恩厚，與羽結好。) Sanguozhi vol. 54.)

== Invasion of Jing Province ==
In 219, Guan Yu led an army to attack Cao Cao's fortress at Fancheng (樊城; present-day Fancheng District, Xiangyang, Hubei), which was defended by Cao Ren. He left behind his subordinates Shi Ren and Mi Fang to defend Gong'an County and Nan Commandery (南郡; around present-day Jingzhou, Hubei) respectively. When Lü Meng heard about that, he wrote to Sun Quan: (Note: (後羽討樊，留兵將備公安、南郡。蒙上疏曰： ...) Sanguozhi vol. 54.)

"When Guan Yu went to attack Fancheng, he left behind many backup forces because he was afraid that I would seize the territories in his absence. I am often ill. Now, I request to return to Jianye under the guise of seeking medical treatment. When Guan Yu learns that I have left Jing Province, he will definitely withdraw the backup forces and move all out towards Xiangyang. When that happens, our troops will sail along the river, travelling day and night, and swiftly attack the weakly defended territories. We can thus conquer Nan Commandery and capture Guan Yu." (Note: (... 「羽討樊而多留備兵，必恐蒙圖其後故也。蒙常有病，乞分士衆還建業，以治疾為名。羽聞之，必撤備兵，盡赴襄陽。大軍浮江，晝夜馳上，襲其空虛，則南郡可下，而羽可禽也。」) Sanguozhi vol. 54.)

Sun Quan agreed to Lü Meng's plan and played along by openly approving his request to return to Jianye for medical treatment. (Note: (遂稱病篤，權乃露檄召蒙還，陰與圖計。) Sanguozhi vol. 54.)

Guan Yu fell for the ruse and withdrew the backup forces and advanced towards Fancheng. When Cao Cao heard of the attack at Fancheng, he sent Yu Jin to lead an army to relief Cao Ren, but Yu Jin lost the battle and surrendered to Guan Yu. Guan Yu's troops increased in numbers after his victory so he lacked food supplies. He sent his men to seize grain from one of Sun Quan's depots along the Xiang River. When Sun Quan heard about it, he sent Lü Meng ahead to invade Jing Province while he followed up behind. Lü Meng arrived at Xunyang County (尋陽縣; southwest of present-day Huangmei County, Hubei), where he ordered his elite soldiers to disguise themselves as merchants and sail towards Nan Commandery. On the journey, they captured the watchtowers set up by Guan Yu along the river to prevent the defenders from learning of their approach. Guan Yu was totally unaware of this. (Note: (羽果信之，稍撤兵以赴樊。魏使于禁救樊，羽盡禽禁等，人馬數萬，託以糧乏，擅取湘關米。權聞之，遂行，先遣蒙在前。蒙至尋陽，盡伏其精兵[][]中，使白衣搖櫓，作商賈人服，晝夜兼行，至羽所置江邊屯候，盡收縛之，是故羽不聞知。遂到南郡，士仁、麋芳皆降。) Sanguozhi vol. 54.) Shi Ren, who was defending Gong'an County, surrendered to Lü Meng after Yu Fan, an official under Sun Quan, persuaded him to do so. Earlier on, Guan Yu had punished Mi Fang for negligently causing some weapons to be destroyed in a fire. Although the incident was over, Mi Fang still feared Guan Yu. Lü Meng showed understanding towards Mi Fang and convinced him to surrender as well. (Note: (吳書曰：將軍士仁在公安拒守，蒙令虞翻說之。翻至城門，謂守者曰：「吾欲與汝將軍語。」仁不肯相見。乃為書曰：「明者防禍於未萌，智者圖患於將來，知得知失，可與為人，知存知亡，足別吉凶。大軍之行，斥候不及施，烽火不及舉，此非天命，必有內應。將軍不先見時，時至又不應之，獨守縈帶之城而不降，死戰則毀宗滅祀，為天下譏笑。呂虎威欲徑到南郡，斷絕陸道，生路一塞，案其地形，將軍為在箕舌上耳，奔走不得免，降則失義，竊為將軍不安，幸孰思焉。」仁得書，流涕而降。翻謂蒙曰：「此譎兵也，當將仁行，留兵備城。」遂將仁至南郡。南郡太守麋芳城守，蒙以仁示之，遂降。) Wu Shu annotation in Sanguozhi vol. 54.) (Note: (吳錄曰：初，南郡城中失火，頗焚燒軍器。羽以責芳，芳內畏懼，權聞而誘之，芳潛相和。及蒙攻之，乃以牛酒出降。) Wu Lu annotation in Sanguozhi vol. 54.)

After entering Nan Commandery, Lü Meng treated the civilian population well, among whom included family members of Guan Yu's troops. He also gave strict orders to his men, forbidding them from disturbing the people. In one incident, Lü Meng executed one of his soldiers for stealing from a civilian household, even though that soldier was an old acquaintance of his. He shed tears after that. This incident shocked the other soldiers in Lü Meng's unit and they did not dare to defy his orders. Lü Meng won the hearts of the people by showing kindness towards them – he provided necessities such as food and clothing to the elderly and the poor, and distributed medicine to the sick. He also ordered the treasury in the commandery office to be sealed up while they awaited Sun Quan's arrival. (Note: (蒙入據城，盡得羽及將士家屬，皆撫慰，約令軍中不得干歷人家，有所求取。蒙麾下士，是汝南人，取民家一笠，以覆官鎧，官鎧雖公，蒙猶以為犯軍令，不可以鄉里故而廢法，遂垂涕斬之。於是軍中震慄，道不拾遺。蒙旦暮使親近存恤耆老，問所不足，疾病者給醫藥，饑寒者賜衣糧。羽府藏財寶，皆封閉以待權至。) Sanguozhi vol. 54.)

Guan Yu was returning to Nan Commandery when he heard that his territories in Jing Province had fallen to Lü Meng. He sent messengers to meet Lü Meng, who brought them on a tour of the city. When the messengers returned to Guan Yu, they spread the word that their families were well. Guan Yu's troops lost their fighting spirit after hearing that Lü Meng treated their families better than how Guan Yu treated them in the past. Guan Yu knew that he had lost and was isolated, so he withdrew to Maicheng (麥城; around present-day Maicheng Village, Lianghe Town, Dangyang, Hubei). When they reached Zhang District (漳鄉) in the west, Guan Yu's men deserted and surrendered to Sun Quan's forces. Sun Quan sent Zhu Ran and Pan Zhang to block Guan Yu's retreat route. Guan Yu and his son Guan Ping were captured by Sun Quan's forces in an ambush and subsequently executed. Liu Bei lost all his territories in Jing Province to Sun Quan. (Note: (羽還，在道路，數使人與蒙相聞，蒙輒厚遇其使，周游城中，家家致問，或手書示信。羽人還，私相參訊，咸知家門無恙，見待過於平時，故羽吏士無鬬心。會權尋至，羽自知孤窮，乃走麥城，西至漳鄉，衆皆委羽而降。權使朱然、潘璋斷其徑路，即父子俱獲，荊州遂定。) Sanguozhi vol. 54.)

== Death ==
For his achievements in the conquest of Jing Province, Lü Meng was appointed as the Administrator (太守) of Nan Commandery. He was also enfeoffed as the Marquis of Chanling (孱陵侯) and awarded 100 million coins and 500 jin of gold. (Note: (以蒙為南郡太守，封孱陵侯，賜錢一億，黃金五百斤。) Sanguozhi vol. 54.) Earlier on, Sun Quan threw a feast at Gong'an County to celebrate the victory, but Lü Meng did not want to attend because he was ill. Sun Quan laughed and said: "Ziming, you deserve the honour of capturing Guan Yu. You have achieved victory but haven't received any reward yet, so how can you leave now?" He ordered the soldiers to play music, and personally selected subordinates for Lü Meng and the equipment required for the ceremony. After the ceremony, all the soldiers lined up along the path when Lü Meng took his leave, with music playing in the background. That was Lü Meng's finest hour. (Note: (江表傳曰：權於公安大會，呂蒙以疾辭，權笑曰：「禽羽之功，子明謀也，今大功已捷，慶賞未行，豈邑邑邪？」乃增給步騎鼓吹，勑選虎威將軍官屬，并南郡、廬江二郡威儀。拜畢還營，兵馬導從，前後鼓吹，光耀于路。) Jiang Biao Zhuan annotation in Sanguozhi vol. 54.)

Lü Meng rejected the coins and gold, but Sun Quan insisted that he accept. He became ill again before he was enfeoffed as a marquis. Sun Quan was at Gong'an County then, so he had Lü Meng brought to his personal residence to stay with him. He also offered 1,000 jin of gold as a reward to any person who could cure Lü Meng.

Sun Quan became more worried as Lü Meng's condition deteriorated over time. He wanted to see Lü Meng but felt that it was too troublesome to keep moving around, so he had a hole drilled in the wall to observe Lü Meng's room. He was happy when he saw Lü Meng having his meals, but could not sleep at night when he saw that Lü Meng did not eat anything. When Lü Meng's condition improved slightly, he was so happy that he ordered his subjects to visit Lü Meng and wish him well. He even invited Taoist priests to perform rituals to increase Lü Meng's lifespan. Despite Sun Quan's efforts, Lü Meng eventually died in Gong'an County at the age of 42 (by East Asian age reckoning). Sun Quan was extremely grieved by Lü Meng's death.

Before Lü Meng died, he had instructed his family to store all their prized possessions – including gifts from Sun Quan – in a vault and return them to his lord after his death. He had also asked for a simple funeral. Sun Quan felt even more sad when found out that Lü Meng had made such arrangements before his death. (Note: (蒙固辭金錢，權不許。封爵未下，會蒙疾發，權時在公安，迎置內殿，所以治護者萬方，募封內有能愈蒙疾者，賜千金。時有鍼加，權為之慘慼，欲數見其顏色，又恐勞動，常穿壁瞻之，見小能下食則喜，顧左右言笑，不然則咄唶，夜不能寐。病中瘳，為下赦令，羣臣畢賀。後更增篤，權自臨視，命道士於星辰下為之請命。年四十二，遂卒於內殿。時權哀痛甚，為之降損。蒙未死時，所得金寶諸賜盡付府藏，勑主者命絕之日皆上還，喪事務約。權聞之，益以悲感。) Sanguozhi vol. 54.)

== Family ==
Lü Meng's marquis title was inherited by his son, Lü Ba (呂霸). Lü Ba received 50 qing of land (Note: One qing was approximately equivalent to 6.67 hectares.) and 300 households to help him keep watch over his father's tomb. After Lü Ba died, his elder brother Lü Cong (呂琮) succeeded him and inherited the marquis title. Lü Cong, in turn, passed on the marquis title to his younger brother, Lü Mu (呂睦), after his death. (Note: (蒙子霸襲爵，與守冢三百家，復田五十頃。霸卒，兄琮襲侯。琮卒，弟睦嗣。) Sanguozhi vol. 54.)

== Anecdotes ==
=== Incident with Cai Yi ===
In his younger days, Lü Meng was not competent in reading and writing. Whenever he issued orders, he had to verbally instruct his subordinates or ask someone to help him write. Cai Yi (蔡遺), the Administrator of Jiangxia Commandery, scorned him because of that. However, Lü Meng never hated Cai Yi for treating him with contempt. When Gu Shao (顧邵), the Administrator of Yuzhang Commandery, died, Lü Meng recommended Cai Yi to Sun Quan to replace Gu Shao. Sun Quan laughed and asked Lü Meng, "Are you trying to be like Qi Xi?" (Note: Qi Xi (祁奚) was an official in the Jin state during the Spring and Autumn period. He once recommended Xie Hu (解狐), whom he had a personal feud with, to serve under his lord, Duke Dao.) He heeded Lü Meng's suggestion. (Note: (蒙少不脩書傳，每陳大事，常口占為牋疏。常以部曲事為江夏太守蔡遺所白，蒙無恨意。及豫章太守顧邵卒，權問所用，蒙因薦遺奉職佳吏，權笑曰：「君欲為祁奚耶？」於是用之。) Sanguozhi vol. 54.)

=== Tolerating Gan Ning ===
Lü Meng was unhappy with Gan Ning, a general under Sun Quan, because of his violent and murderous ways. There was one incident where Lü Meng was so furious with Gan Ning that he wanted to kill him. Gan Ning also infuriated Sun Quan on a number of occasions when he defied his lord's orders. When Lü Meng heard about it, he told Sun Quan: "The Empire has yet to be pacified. Fierce generals like Gan Ning are hard to come by. You should tolerate him." Sun Quan heeded Lü Meng's advice and treated Gan Ning generously. In return, Gan Ning served Sun Quan faithfully until his death. (Note: (甘寧麤暴好殺，旣常失蒙意，又時違權令，權怒之，蒙輒陳請：「天下未定，鬬將如寧難得，宜容忍之。」權遂厚寧，卒得其用。) Sanguozhi vol. 54.)

== Appraisal ==
Sun Quan once said: "A person improves as he grows older. Lü Meng and Jiang Qin are two excellent examples. They have obtained wealth and glory, yet they are willing to pick up reading and scholarly pursuits. They view material wealth lightly and value righteousness." (Note: (權常歎曰：「人長而進益，如呂蒙、蔣欽，蓋不可及也。富貴榮顯，更能折節好學，耽恱書傳，輕財尚義，所行可迹，並作國士，不亦休乎！」) Jiang Biao Zhuan annotation in Sanguozhi vol. 54.) On another occasion, he said: "When Ziming was young, I said he was someone who didn't give in to adversity, he was indeed courageous but only so. When he grew older, he became more knowledgeable and resourceful, and was second to Gongjin, but less capable in debate and literary arts as compared to Gongjin. When he defeated and captured Guan Yu, he did better than Lu Zijing." (Note: (子明少時，孤謂不辭劇易，果敢有膽而已。及身長大，學問開益，籌略奇至，可以次於公瑾，但言議英發不及之耳。圖取關羽，勝於魯子敬。) Sanguozhi vol. 54.)

Chen Shou, who wrote Lü Meng's biography in the Sanguozhi, commented on him as follows: "Lü Meng was courageous and witty, decisive and well-versed in military strategy. Deceiving Hao Pu and capturing Guan Yu – those were his finest moments. Initially, he was rash and reckless, but eventually he managed to exercise self-restraint. He possessed the magnanimity of a great statesman and was not a mere warrior! Sun Quan's comments on Lü Meng, both positive and negative, were befitting, hence I included them in this record." (Note: (呂蒙勇而有謀，斷識軍計，譎郝普，禽關羽，最其妙者。初雖輕果妄殺，終於克己，有國士之量，豈徒武將而已乎！孫權之論，優劣允當，故載錄焉。) Sanguozhi vol. 54.)

== In Romance of the Three Kingdoms ==
Lü Meng appears as a character in the 14th-century historical novel Romance of the Three Kingdoms, which romanticises the historical events before and during the Three Kingdoms period. His death is dramatised in chapter 77 of the novel.

Sun Quan and his subjects are celebrating their conquest of Jing Province, with Lü Meng receiving the highest honour. During the banquet, Guan Yu's spirit suddenly possesses Lü Meng, grabs Sun Quan and shouts, "Green-eyed brat! Purple-bearded coward, do you still recognise me?" Sun Quan's subordinates immediately rush forth to save their lord. The possessed Lü Meng shoves Sun Quan away and sits on his seat. With a furious expression on his face, he booms, "Since defeating the Yellow Turban rebels, I have fought in wars for over 30 years. But I lost my life because you used an evil scheme against me. I can't feast on your flesh when I was still alive, but I can still seize Lü Meng's soul after death! I am Guan Yunchang, the Marquis of Hanshou Village." Sun Quan and the others are so terrified that they sink to their knees. Lü Meng collapses and dies, bleeding from seven body orifices. Everyone is traumatised by the scene they witnessed.

== In popular culture ==
Lü Meng is featured as a playable character in Koei's Dynasty Warriors and Warriors Orochi video game series. In the games, his name is spelled as "Lu Meng" without the diaeresis in the "U" in "Lu". He also appears in all instalments of Koei's strategy game series Romance of the Three Kingdoms.

The fictional character Ryomou Shimei of the anime and manga series Ikki Tousen is based on Lü Meng.

Lü Meng appears in Total War: Three Kingdoms as a playable character within Sun Ce's faction.

== See also ==
- Lists of people of the Three Kingdoms
