= Battle of Ruxu (217) =

Battle between warlords Sun Quan and Cao Cao (217)

- Part of the wars at the end of the Han dynasty
Date	217 CE
Location	Yang Province, China
Result	Indecisive, Cao Cao retreat

Belligerents
Sun Quan	Cao Cao

Commanders and leaders
Sun Quan	Cao Cao

Strength
73,000 (estimated)	400,000 (estimated)

Battle of Ruxu
- Traditional Chinese: 濡須之戰
- Simplified Chinese: 濡须之战
Transcriptions
Standard Mandarin
- Hanyu Pinyin: Rúxū Zhī Zhàn

Battle of Ruxukou
- Traditional Chinese: 濡須口之戰
- Simplified Chinese: 濡须口之战
Transcriptions
Standard Mandarin
- Hanyu Pinyin: Rúxūkǒu Zhī Zhàn

The Battle of Ruxu, also known as the Battle of Ruxukou, was fought between the warlords Sun Quan and Cao Cao in 217 in the late Eastern Han dynasty. Two years earlier, Sun Quan attempted to take control of Hefei fortress, but failed due to a sudden plague and the staunch resistance put up by Cao Cao's forces under Zhang Liao. Since then, Cao Cao had been making preparations for a counterattack on Sun Quan, and he personally led his navy to Ruxu to fight a decisive battle.

This battle is not to be confused with another earlier battle that also took place at Ruxu in 213.

== Battle ==
Before Cao Cao's massive army arrived at the battlefield, Sun Quan's second-in-command, Lü Meng, had already started to strengthen the defences of Ruxu fort, leaving the transportation and retreat route open for Sun. Meanwhile, Cao Cao operated his Hefei fortress as a front-line base, stationing his troops there; in addition, Cao Cao ordered Zang Ba and Sun Guan to mobilize their "Qingzhou Corps" to the battlefield.

When Cao Cao pressed on Ruxu fort, Sun Quan sent out Ling Tong, Xu Sheng and the like to do battle. During the ensuing engagement, Sun Guan was killed in action, and Cao Cao temporarily halted the attack. The development was not as optimistic as Cao had expected, so he set up numerous camps across a river, and prepared for a long-term war. Cao ordered Xiahou Dun to lead his "26 armies" from Juchao to the frontline.

Facing the growing number of Cao Cao's troops, Sun Quan ordered his generals to maintain a line of defense, which Cao Cao was never able to break.

The tide of battle turned heavily in Sun Quan's favour when Gan Ning led 100 men into Cao Cao's main camp under cover of night and laid waste to the camp, throwing Cao's armies into confusion. Gan Ning and his unit left without any casualties, and the demoralized armies of Cao Cao withdrew from the battle.

== Order of battle ==
=== Sun Quan forces ===
- Sun Quan
- Lü Meng
- Jiang Qin
- Xu Sheng
- Zhou Tai
- Gan Ning
- Ling Tong
- Zhu Ran
- Xu Xiang

=== Cao Cao forces ===
- Cao Cao
- Xiahou Dun
- Cao Ren
- Zhang Liao

== In popular culture ==
The battle is featured as a playable stage in Koei's video game Dynasty Warriors 5: Xtreme Legends. If the player is playing on Sun Quan's side, he can use Gan Ning's night raid to win the battle. In earlier versions of the game, this battle is merged with the Battle of He Fei.
