= Huang Zu =

Chinese official and general (died 208)

- 黃祖

Administrator of Jiangxia (江夏太守) (under Liu Biao)
- In office ? – 208
- Monarch: Emperor Xian of Han
- Succeeded by: Wen Ping

Personal details
- Born: Unknown
- Died: 208 Wuhan, Hubei
- Children: Huang She
- Occupation: Military general, politician

Huang Zu (Chinese: 黃祖; pinyin: Huáng Zǔ,) (died between February and April 208) was a Chinese military general and politician during the late Eastern Han dynasty. He served as the Administrator of Jiangxia Commandery (江夏郡; around present-day Xinzhou District, Wuhan, Hubei) under Liu Biao, the Governor of Jing Province (covering present-day Hubei and Hunan). He is best known for killing the warlord Sun Jian in an ambush during the Battle of Xiangyang (191) and resisting an invasion by the warlord Sun Quan (Sun Jian's son) at the Battle of Xiakou (203). He was defeated and killed at the Battle of Jiangxia in 208 against Sun Quan's forces.

== Background ==
There are plenty of historical records concerning Huang Zu, but they are scattered over different texts while Huang Zu never had a biography in any official record. Since Jiangxia Commandery (江夏郡; around present-day Xinzhou District, Wuhan, Hubei) is known for being the cradle of the Huang family, Huang Zu, as the commandery's Administrator, probably came from an influential family based there. After Liu Biao arrived in Jing Province (covering present-day Hubei and Hunan) to assume his governorship of the region, he sought to form alliances with the local elites, particularly the Huang family who had been defending Jiangxia Commandery in eastern Jing Province from aggression by a neighbouring warlord, Yuan Shu. In return, Liu Biao provided financial aid to Huang Zu in peacetime and military support for his naval forces during wartime. Under such arrangements, even though Huang Zu was nominally a subordinate of Liu Biao, he maintained much autonomy over Jiangxia Commandery.

== Battle of Xiangyang ==
In 191, war broke out between the warlords Yuan Shao and Yuan Shu, who were half-brothers. Yuan Shao formed an alliance with Liu Biao while Yuan Shu gained support from Sun Jian to attack Liu Biao's territories in Jing Province.

Liu Biao assigned Huang Zu to defend Fancheng (樊城; in present-day Xiangyang, Hubei) and Dengzhou (鄧州; in present-day Nanyang, Henan) from Sun Jian's attacks. However, Huang Zu lost to Sun Jian in battle and realised that he could not defeat the enemy on flat and open terrain, so he retreated to Xiangyang Commandery, the capital of Jing Province, and holed up behind the city walls. One night, Huang Zu led a group of soldiers to launch a sneak attack on Sun Jian's camp but failed to catch the enemy by surprise. Nevertheless, Sun Jian died after being hit by a stray arrow while pursuing Huang Zu into a forest. (Note: Although it is not known exactly how Sun Jian died, the most accepted theory is that he was killed by a stray arrow from one of Huang Zu's archers.)

In the 14th-century historical novel Romance of the Three Kingdoms, Liu Biao's subordinates Kuai Liang and Lü Gong (呂公) set up the ambush that killed Sun Jian. Huang Zu is captured by Sun Jian's eldest son, Sun Ce, but is later released in exchange for Sun Jian's dead body. Historically, however, Sun Ce never captured Huang Zu, who was given full credit in historical records for defeating and killing Sun Jian.

== Resisting Sun Ce's expansion ==
Following Sun Jian's death, Liu Biao no longer saw Yuan Shu as a threat in the east, so he focused on consolidating his control over Jing Province while leaving Huang Zu in charge of Jiangxia Commandery. In the meantime, throughout the 190s, Sun Jian's eldest son, Sun Ce, conquered the territories in the Jiangdong region of Yang Province adjacent to Jing Province. In late 199, when Sun Ce was seizing control of Lujiang Commandery (廬江郡; around present-day Lu'an, Anhui) from Liu Xun, Liu Biao instigated Huang Zu to attack Sun Ce at Shaxian (沙羨; west of present-day Wuhan, Hubei). (Note: The Wu Lu recorded a memorial which Sun Ce submitted to the Han court. In it, Sun wrote that his forces reached Shaxian on the 8th day of the 12th month of that year (corresponding to 11 Jan 200 in the Julian calendar), and that the battle began on the 11th day (14 Jan 200).)

Sun Ce brought along his cousins Sun Ben and Sun Fu and other subordinates and henchmen such as Zhou Yu and Taishi Ci, and led an army to resist Huang Zu. Huang Zu, on the other hand, gathered his clansmen, his son Huang She (黃射) and Liu Biao's nephew Liu Pan (劉磐), and led his troops to engage Sun Ce's forces. Sun Ce defeated Huang Zu in the battle and killed thousands of enemies, forcing Huang Zu to retreat back to Jiangxia Commandery. During the counterattack, Sun Ce managed to expand his territorial boundaries slightly into the outskirts of Jiangxia Commandery.

In 200 CE, the warlord Cao Cao, who controlled the Han central government and the figurehead Emperor Xian, sent Mi Heng, a talented but obnoxious scholar, as a guest to Liu Biao. Although Mi Heng and Liu Biao got along well initially, Mi Heng started to insult and belittle Liu Biao after some time. Unable to put up with Mi Heng's obnoxious behaviour, Liu Biao then sent him to Huang Zu. Huang Zu could not tolerate Mi Heng and had him executed.

== Battle of Xiakou ==
In the year 200, after Sun Ce was assassinated, his younger brother Sun Quan succeeded him and became the warlord of the Jiangdong territories. In 203, Sun Quan launched an invasion of Xiakou (夏口; within present-day Wuhan, Hubei) and appointed Ling Cao to lead the vanguard force. Upon arriving at Xiakou, Ling Cao led his men on a charge and managed to break through Huang Zu's defences and throw the enemy fleet into confusion with the sudden attack. However, he was killed in the midst of battle by a stray arrow fired by Gan Ning, one of Huang Zu's subordinates. Huang Zu was thus able to retreat safely back to Jiangxia Commandery.

After the battle, Su Fei (蘇飛), one of Huang Zu's subordinates, recommended Gan Ning for promotion. However, Huang Zu not only did not feel grateful towards Gan Ning, but also attempted to entice Gan Ning's followers to abandon their leader and join him. Some of them agreed. Gan Ning was so unhappy with Huang Zu that he eventually left him (with help from Su Fei) and defected to Sun Quan's side.

In the years after the Battle of Xiakou, Sun Quan continued to engage Huang Zu in incessant battles from time to time, but none of these battles were conclusive or of a large scale, as Sun Quan was also busy putting down rebellions in the Jiangdong territories.

== Downfall ==
In the spring of 208, Gan Ning suggested to Sun Quan to prepare for a full assault on Jiangxia Commandery and he pointed out that Huang Zu was old and feeble and had not replenished his arsenal in a while. Sun Quan heeded Gan Ning's advice and ordered Ling Cao's son Ling Tong to lead the vanguard and Lü Meng to be the naval commandant. In response to Sun Quan's invasion, Huang Zu assigned Zhang Shuo (張碩) to lead the vanguard and Chen Jiu (陳就) to command the navy. Unlike the previous battle, Huang Zu did not put himself at the frontline and instead remained behind the walls of Jiangxia Commandery while his subordinates led his troops into battle.

Before the battle started, Zhang Shuo led his men out on a large vessel to scout the riverbank. He encountered Ling Tong, who was also checking out the area with only tens of soldiers on a light vessel. They engaged in combat and Ling Tong slew Zhang Shuo and captured the rest of his men.

Upon learning of Zhang Shuo's death, Huang Zu immediately ordered Chen Jiu to block the entrance of the Mian River by scuttling two of his largest mengchongs at the chokepoint. In addition, Huang Zu deployed archers on top of the cliff overlooking the Mian River and ordered them to throw boulders and fire arrows at approaching enemy vessels. Sun Quan sent his largest vessels to destroy the mengchongs but to no avail. After some lengthy fighting, Sun Quan realised that Huang Zu's arsenal was not as rusty as he thought, and saw that he had already suffered heavy losses on his side.

Sun Quan then ordered Ling Tong and Dong Xi, along with 100 "commandos", to wear two layers of armour each and charge towards the enemy in the face of boulders and arrows raining down on them. After a tough fight, Ling Tong and Dong Xi managed to break the thick rope connecting the mengchongs and allow Sun Quan's navy to pass through. Lü Meng killed Chen Jiu on board his warship while Ling Tong breached the walls of Jiangxia Commandery. Huang Zu attempted to flee after his defeat but was killed by Feng Ze (馮則), a soldier in Sun Quan's army.

== See also ==
- Lists of people of the Three Kingdoms
