= Battle of Xiakou =

Battle between warlords Sun Quan and Liu Biao (203)

Coordinates: 31.0625°N 113.7656°E

- Part of the wars at the end of the Han dynasty
Date	Spring of 203 CE
Location	Along the Yangtze River, near present-day Xinzhou District, Wuhan, Hubei
Result	Inconclusive

Belligerents
Sun Quan	Liu Biao

Commanders and leaders
Ling Cao †	Huang Zu

Strength
Several thousands at most	30,000 at least

Battle of Xiakou
- Traditional Chinese: 夏口之戰
- Simplified Chinese: 夏口之战
Transcriptions
Standard Mandarin
- Hanyu Pinyin: Xiàkǒu Zhī Zhàn

The Battle of Xiakou was fought between the warlords Sun Quan and Liu Biao in 203 in the late Eastern Han dynasty. Sun Quan's forces attempted to conquer Jiangxia Commandery (present-day Xinzhou District, Wuhan, Hubei), which was defended by Liu Biao's general, Huang Zu. The battle was inconclusive as Sun Quan's forces were unable to capture Jiangxia even when Huang Zu retreated. The battle is not to be confused with the Battle of Jiangxia that took place five years later, which concluded with victory for Sun Quan over Huang Zu.

== Background ==
In 200, Sun Quan inherited the territories in Jiangdong conquered by his older brother, Sun Ce, between 194 and 199. He was confirmed by the Han government's de facto leader, Cao Cao, as a legitimate lord of the Jiangdong lands, and was appointed by the Han government as Grand Administrator of Kuaiji.

Two years later, Sun Quan suppressed a rebellion by Li Shu and merged Li's 30,000 troops into his own army. By 203, Sun Quan had achieved a stable control over his territories in Jiangdong, so he set into motion a strategy proposed by his advisor, Lu Su. According to the plan, Sun Quan would take Jing Province (covering present-day Hubei and Hunan), governed by Liu Biao, and take control of all the lands in southern China, then use the Yangtze River as a natural barrier to defend against invading forces from the north. The first obstacle on Sun Quan's path to dominating Jing Province was Jiangxia Commandery, which served as the eastern gateway to Jing Province along the Yangtze. In addition, Sun Quan had a personal stake in the campaign on Jiangxia because Huang Zu, Liu Biao's appointed Administrator of Jiangxia, was responsible for causing the death of his father, Sun Jian, at the Battle of Xiangyang, 12 years ago.

== Battle ==
Sun Quan appointed Ling Cao as leader of the vanguard fleet and ordered him to mobilize first, while he kept the larger vessels with himself for a slower advance. On the other hand, Huang Zu led his army from Jiangxia to Xiakou and set up a defense line in anticipation of the enemy.

En route to Jiangxia, Ling Cao's fleet encountered Huang Zu's navy at the Xiakou riverbank, with Huang's large vessels spread out far and wide. Even though Ling Cao was at a numerical disadvantage then, he considered it his duty as a vanguard leader to eliminate any enemy standing in his lord's path. Undaunted, Ling Cao charged ahead of his men and dashed uninterruptedly into the heart of Huang Zu's fleet. Since Huang Zu did not expect such a small unit to engage his larger force, he was unprepared for Ling Cao's attack. Before Huang Zu could react to the situation, Ling Cao had cleared a path in front of him. Fearing for his life, Huang Zu abandoned his flagship and boarded a small boat, leaving his navy impaired. When Huang Zu's soldiers saw their commander fleeing towards their home base, they started to desert their posts and scrambled to retreat, resulting in a total collapse of the naval formation.

Ling Cao gave pursuit to Huang Zu and boarded a light vessel in the midst of chaos and fighting. However, when he was close to claiming Huang Zu's head, he was hit by an arrow fired by Huang's subordinate, Gan Ning, and died. Thus, Huang was able to retreat to Jiangxia safely. Huang Zu remained in Jiangxia thereafter and did not respond to the challenges of Sun Quan's main army. Unable to breach Jiangxia's walls, Sun Quan soon withdrew his troops to Jiangdong to deal with the Shanyue tribes who constantly raided his lands.

== Aftermath ==
Even though Gan Ning saved Huang Zu's life at a critical moment, Huang was unappreciative of his effort because he despised Gan for his background (Gan Ning used to be a pirate). Gan Ning then heeded the advice of his comrade, Su Fei (蘇飛), to defect to Sun Quan's side, bringing along with him confidential intelligence on Huang Zu's forces. Sun Quan received Gan Ning warmly and followed Gan's suggestion to launch a full assault on Huang Zu again three years later, in 208, starting the subsequent Battle of Jiangxia.

== In popular culture ==
The Battle of Xiakou is featured as a playable stage in the fourth, fifth, and seventh installments of Koei's video game series, Dynasty Warriors. In the games, the battle was merged with the Battle of Jiangxia. In the later installments, the battle became more significant after Ling Tong (Ling Cao's son) became a playable character. In Dynasty Warriors 5, it was incorrectly stated that the Battle of Xiakou took place in 208.
