= Gan Ning =

General serving warlord Sun Quan (died c. 220)

- 甘寧
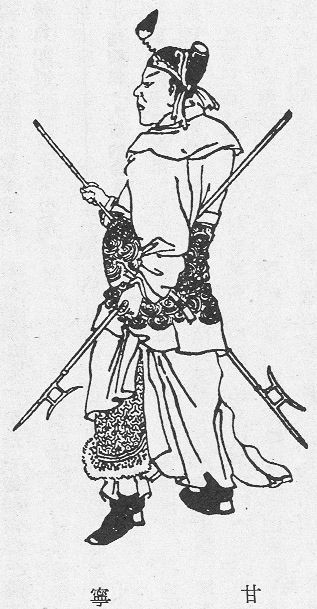
- Qing dynasty illustration of Gan Ning

General Who Breaks and Charges (折衝將軍)
- In office 215 – ?

Administrator of Xiling (西陵太守)
- In office c. 214 – 215

Personal details
- Born: Unknown Zhong County, Chongqing
- Died: Unknown
- Children: Gan Gui; Gan Shu
- Occupation: Military general
- Courtesy name: Xingba (興霸)

Gan Ning (c. early 170s - c. 220 (Note: See this section.)), courtesy name Xingba, was a Chinese military general serving under the warlord Sun Quan in the late Eastern Han dynasty. Originally a notorious pirate, he gave up the life of a marauder in the late 190s and became a subordinate of Huang Zu, the Administrator of a commandery in present-day east-central Hubei. Disheartened by Huang Zu's indifferent attitude towards him, Gan Ning eventually left Huang and made his way into Wu territory (present-day eastern and southeastern China), where he found his calling and became a military officer under the warlord Sun Quan. Throughout his years of service under Sun Quan until his death, Gan Ning fought in numerous battles for his lord, including the battles of Jiangxia (208), Red Cliffs (208–209), Xiaoyao Ford (214–215) and Ruxu (217).

== Early life ==
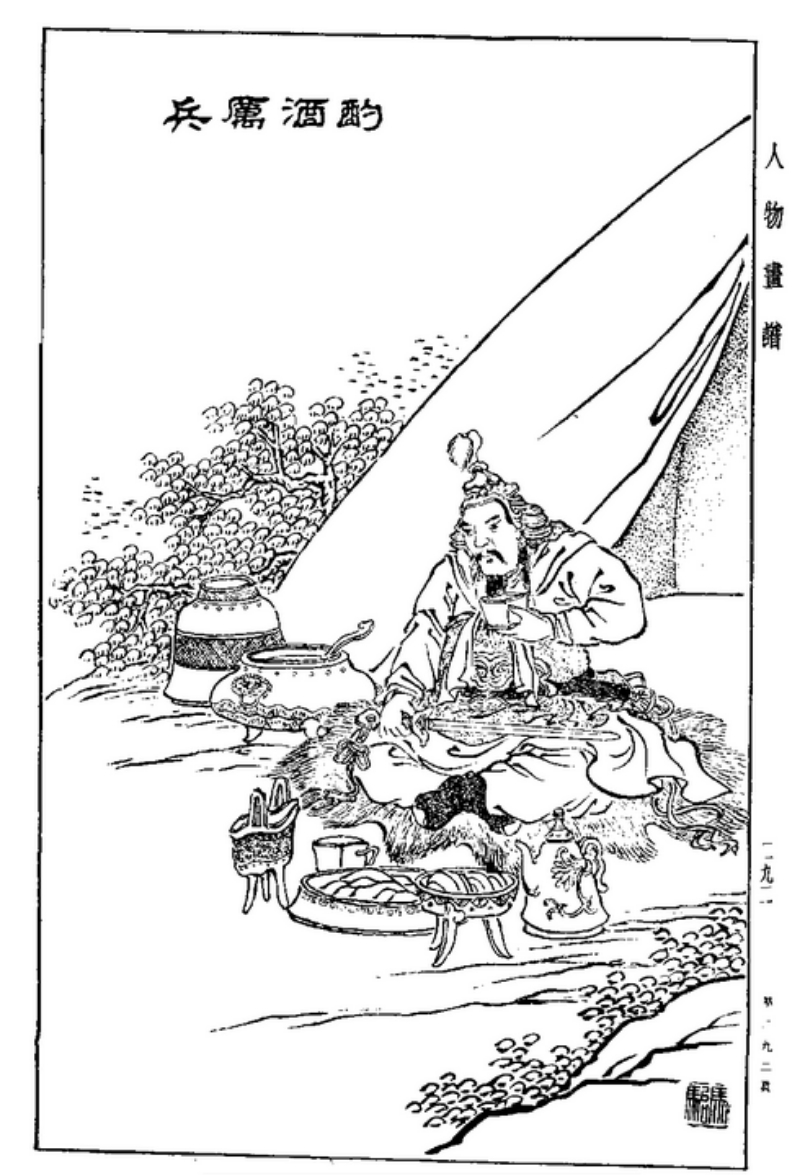
Gan Ning in the Ma Tai Hua Bao

Gan Ning was from Linjiang County (臨江縣), Ba Commandery (巴郡), which is in present-day Zhong County, Chongqing. (Note: (甘寧字興霸，巴郡臨江人也。) Sanguozhi vol. 55.) His ancestral home was actually in Nanyang, Henan; his ancestors migrated to Ba Commandery and settled there. When he was still a youth, he accepted an offer to serve as an accounting assistant in the local commandery office. He resigned and went home after serving for a short period of time. (Note: (吳書曰：寧本南陽人，其先客於巴郡。寧為吏舉計掾，補蜀郡丞，頃之，棄官歸家。) Wu Shu annotation in Sanguozhi vol. 55.)

In his younger days, Gan Ning was known to be very energetic and eager to behave like a youxia or vigilante. He gathered a group of wayward young men under his leadership to rob and plunder for a living. They armed themselves with bows and crossbows, wore feathers in their hats and tied bells on their bodies. The ringing of the bells alerted people to the presence of Gan Ning and his gang. (Note: (少有氣力，好游俠，招合輕薄少年，為之渠帥；羣聚相隨，挾持弓弩，負毦帶鈴，民聞鈴聲，即知是寧。) Sanguozhi vol. 55.) Gan Ning's plundering and murderous ways made him infamous throughout Ba Commandery. On land, he and his gang travelled by riding on horses or in chariots in a certain formation; on water, they sailed on light vessels linked together. They also wore elaborate and flamboyant garments to attract attention. When they stopped at a certain location, they used silk to tie their boats to the jetties; when they were departing, they cut the silk and abandoned it as a display of their extravagance. (Note: (吳書曰：寧輕俠殺人，藏舍亡命，聞於郡中。其出入，步則陳車騎，水則連輕舟，侍從被文繡，所如光道路，住止常以繒錦維舟，去或割棄，以示奢也。) Wu Shu annotation in Sanguozhi vol. 55.)

Among those who had dealings with Gan Ning were some local officials. They treated Gan Ning generously. In return, he befriended them and showed genuine feelings towards them. On the other hand, those who treated him badly suffered the fate of being robbed of their possessions by him and his gang. Even government officials were not spared. Gan Ning led the life of a marauder until he was over 20 years old. (Note: (人與相逢，及屬城長吏，接待隆厚者乃與交歡；不爾，即放所將奪其資貨，於長吏界中有所賊害，作其發負，至二十餘年。) Sanguozhi vol. 55.)

After Liu Yan, the governor of Yi Province (covering present-day Sichuan and Chongqing), died in 194, Gan Ning rebelled against his son and successor, Liu Zhang. He received support from Liu He (劉闔), an official from the neighbouring Jing Province (covering present-day Hubei and Hunan), and Liu Zhang's subordinates Shen Mi (沈彌) and Lou Fa (婁發). However, they failed and were forced to flee to Jing Province. (Note: (英雄記曰：焉死，子璋代為刺史。會長安拜潁川扈瑁為刺史，入漢中。荊州別駕劉闔，璋將沈彌、婁發、甘寧反，擊璋不勝，走入荊州。) Yingxiong Ji annotation in Sanguozhi vol. 31.)

== Service under Liu Biao and Huang Zu ==
Gan Ning eventually decided to stop plundering and pillaging. He read some books and picked up ideas from the Hundred Schools of Thought. Later, he brought along 800 men to join Liu Biao, the Governor of Jing Province (covering present-day Hubei and Hunan), and was stationed in Nanyang Commandery. Liu Biao had a scholarly background and was not proficient in military affairs. Around the time, chaos had broken out all around China as contending warlords fought each other for territorial gains and hegemony over the empire. Gan Ning observed that Liu Biao was doomed to failure and was worried that he would be affected, so he and his followers planned to head east towards the Wu (or Jiangdong) region, which was under the control of the warlord Sun Ce and later Sun Quan. When they reached Jiangxia Commandery (江夏郡; present-day eastern Hubei) in eastern Jing Province, they could not cross the border into Wu territory as Sun Quan was at war with Liu Biao at the time. Gan Ning thus remained at Jiangxia and became a subordinate of the commandery administrator, Huang Zu, who did not recognise his talent and treated him coldly for three years. (Note: (止不攻劫，頗讀諸子，乃往依劉表，因居南陽，不見進用，後轉託黃祖，祖又以凡人畜之。) Sanguozhi vol. 55.) (Note: (吳書曰：寧將僮客八百人就劉表。表儒人，不習軍事。時諸英豪各各起兵，寧觀表事勢，終必無成，恐一朝土崩，并受其禍，欲東入吳。黃祖在夏口，軍不得過，乃留依祖，三年不禮之。) Wu Shu annotation in Sanguozhi vol. 55.)

In 203, Sun Quan led his forces to attack Huang Zu and defeated him at the Battle of Xiakou. Gan Ning, a skilled archer, led a detachment of troops as backup and came to Huang Zu's rescue. He fired an arrow which killed Ling Cao, a colonel under Sun Quan, thus saving Huang Zu's life. Huang Zu did not change his attitude towards Gan Ning after the incident. Su Fei (蘇飛), an area commander under Huang Zu, recommended Gan Ning as a talent but Huang Zu ignored him. Huang Zu even attempted to induce Gan Ning's followers to abandon their leader and join him instead; some of them agreed. (Note: (權討祖，祖軍敗奔走，追兵急，寧以善射，將兵在後，射殺校尉凌操。祖旣得免，軍罷還營，待寧如初。祖都督蘇飛數薦寧，祖不用，令人化誘其客，客稍亡。) Wu Shu annotation in Sanguozhi vol. 55.)

Gan Ning was very unhappy with Huang Zu and wanted to leave him, but was worried that Huang Zu would not allow it so he felt very frustrated. Su Fei understood Gan Ning's frustration so he invited him for drinks and said: "I recommended you to Huang Zu many times, but he doesn't want to make good use of your talents. As days pass, people grow older. You should make plans for your future and find someone who truly appreciates your talents." Gan Ning paused for a moment before replying: "That's what I have in mind, but I can't find an excuse to leave." Su Fei then said: "I will suggest to Huang Zu to appoint you as the chief of Zhu County (邾縣; northwest of present-day Huanggang, Hubei). Although it may be a difficult start, it will eventually become easier for you to decide where to go from there." After Huang Zu approved Su Fei's suggestion, Gan Ning gathered a few hundred men who were willing to follow him and headed towards Zhu County. (Note: (寧欲去，恐不獲免，獨憂悶不知所出。飛知其意，乃要寧，為之置酒，謂曰：「吾薦子者數矣，主不能用。日月逾邁，人生幾何，宜自遠圖，庶遇知己。」寧良乆乃曰：「雖有其志，未知所由。」飛曰：「吾欲白子為邾長，於是去就，孰與臨阪轉丸乎？」寧曰：「幸甚。」飛白祖，聽寧之縣。招懷亡客并義從者，得數百人。) Wu Shu annotation in Sanguozhi vol. 55.) From there, they crossed the border into the Jiangdong territories.

== Battle of Jiangxia ==
When Gan Ning brought his followers to Jiangdong, Zhou Yu and Lü Meng recommended him as a talent to their lord, Sun Quan. Sun Quan felt that Gan Ning was an extraordinary man and treated him like an old friend. (Note: (於是歸吳。周瑜、呂蒙皆共薦達，孫權加異，同於舊臣。) Sanguozhi vol. 55.) Gan Ning proposed:

"The Han Empire is declining day by day. Cao Cao is becoming increasingly arrogant and he will eventually usurp the throne. The southern territories in Jing Province are accessible in terms of travelling by land or water. The western domain of the Empire lies there. Based on my observation of Liu Biao, he won't last long while his sons are incapable of inheriting his jurisdiction. My lord, you should take control of these lands soon, lest Cao Cao seizes them later. The best plan now is to attack Huang Zu first. Huang Zu is old and muddleheaded. He lacks funding and supplies, cheats those around them, and is only concerned with making personal gains. His subordinates are already unhappy with him because of his overbearing demands. His warships and military equipment are damaged and haven't been repaired; he neglects agriculture; his army is ill-disciplined. If you attack him now, you will surely win. After defeating him, you can move west further and take control of Chu Pass (Note: Chu Pass (楚關) was located to the south of Bashan Village in the west of present-day Changyang County, Hubei.) and expand your domain and influence. After that, you can prepare to attack Bashu. (Note: Bashu (巴蜀) was a historical name for present-day Sichuan derived from the ancient Ba and Shu states based in that area.)" (Note: (寧陳計曰：「今漢祚日微，曹操彌憍，終為篡盜。南荊之地，山陵形便，江川流通，誠是國之西勢也。寧已觀劉表，慮旣不遠，兒子又劣，非能承業傳基者也。至尊當早規之，不可後操圖之。圖之之計，宜先取黃祖。祖今年老，昏耄已甚，財穀並乏，左右欺弄，務於貨利，侵求吏士，吏士心怨，舟船戰具頓廢不脩，怠於耕農，軍無法伍。至尊今往，其破可必。一破祖軍，鼓行而西，西據楚關，大勢彌廣，即可漸規巴蜀。」) Sanguozhi vol. 55.)

Sun Quan wanted to follow Gan Ning's plan, but his adviser Zhang Zhao strongly objected: "The territories in Wu have not been completely pacified yet. If we proceed with this campaign, I am afraid there will be chaos." (Note: (權深納之。張昭時在坐，難曰：「吳下業業，若軍果行，恐必致亂。」) Sanguozhi vol. 55.) Gan Ning rebuked Zhang Zhao: "Our lord has entrusted responsibilities to you as if you were Xiao He. (Note: Xiao He was the first chancellor of the Han dynasty. When Liu Bang, the founding emperor of the Han dynasty, was away at war with his rivals, Xiao He served as a regent in Liu Bang's home territories and ensured the smooth delivery of supplies and reinforcements to Liu Bang's forces at the frontline.) If you can't even be confident that there won't be chaos under your watch, how can you expect to be like Xiao He?" (Note: (寧謂昭曰：「國家以蕭何之任付君，君居守而憂亂，奚以希慕古人乎？」) Sanguozhi vol. 55.) Sun Quan then raised his glass to Gan Ning and said: "Xingba, I have decided to put you in charge of the campaign this year just as I offer this drink to you. You should strive your best to come up with a strategy to defeat Huang Zu. Once you have proven yourself, you won't need to take Zhang Zhao's words to heart." (Note: (權舉酒屬寧曰：「興霸，今年行討，如此酒矣，決以付卿。卿但當勉建方略，令必克祖，則卿之功，何嫌張長史之言乎。」) Sanguozhi vol. 55.)

In the spring of 208, Sun Quan led his forces west to attack Huang Zu at Jiangxia Commandery (江夏郡; around present-day Xinzhou District, Wuhan, Hubei) and succeeded in defeating and capturing Huang Zu alive, as well as taking control over his troops. Gan Ning was placed in command of some soldiers and ordered to garrison at Dangkou (當口). (Note: (權遂西，果禽祖，盡獲其士衆。遂授寧兵，屯當口。) Sanguozhi vol. 55.)

=== Saving Su Fei ===
Before the campaign, Sun Quan had prepared two boxes for containing the heads of Huang Zu and Su Fei (蘇飛). After the battle, Su Fei, who had become a prisoner-of-war, immediately asked someone to inform Gan Ning. Gan Ning said: "If Su Fei didn't say anything, I would have forgotten about him." Later, when Sun Quan and his officers were celebrating the victory, Gan Ning left his seat and knelt down before Sun Quan. He kowtowed until his face was covered in blood and, with tears in his eyes, he pleaded with Sun Quan: "I owe Su Fei a favour. If not for him, I'd have been dead and my body abandoned in a ravine. I'd not have been able to serve under you. Now, even though Su Fei's actions warrant death, I still hope you can spare him." Sun Quan was moved and he asked: "What if he leaves after I spare his life?" Gan Ning replied: "Su Fei will be grateful if he is spared from death. He won't leave even if you try to chase him away. Why would he still court his own doom? If he really does that, I am willing to use my head to replace his in the box." Sun Quan then pardoned Su Fei. (Note: (吳書曰：初，權破祖，先作兩函，欲以盛祖及蘇飛首。飛令人告急於寧，寧曰：「飛若不言，吾豈忘之？」權為諸將置酒，寧下席叩頭，血涕交流，為權言：「飛疇昔舊恩，寧不值飛，固已損骸於溝壑，不得致命於麾下。今飛罪當夷戮，特從將軍乞其首領。」權感其言，謂曰：「今為君致之，若走去何？」寧曰：「飛免分裂之禍，受更生之恩，逐之尚必不走，豈當圖亡哉！若爾，寧頭當代入函。」權乃赦之。) Wu Shu annotation in Sanguozhi vol. 55.)

== Red Cliffs campaign ==
In the winter of 208–209, Gan Ning fought in the Battle of Red Cliffs under Zhou Yu's command against the forces of Cao Cao, and defeated the enemy at Wulin (烏林). He also participated in the subsequent Battle of Jiangling. Sun Quan's forces, led by Zhou Yu, attacked Cao Cao's general Cao Ren at Nan Commandery (南郡; around present-day Jiangling County, Hubei) but were unable to conquer the city. Gan Ning suggested that he lead a separate force to capture Yiling (夷陵; around present-day Yichang, Hubei). He had only a few hundred soldiers with him when he reached Yiling but the strength of his army increased to around 1,000 after he recruited some men in the area. Cao Ren sent 5,000 to 6,000 troops to besiege Gan Ning at Yiling. Cao Ren's men built high towers, from which they rained arrows upon Yiling. Gan Ning's men were terrified but their commander remained calm. He sent a messenger to request aid from Zhou Yu, who heeded Lü Meng's plan and led reinforcements to help Gan Ning while leaving behind Ling Tong to defend their position. (Note: (後隨周瑜拒破曹公於烏林。攻曹仁於南郡，未拔，寧建計先徑進取夷陵，往即得其城，因入守之。時手下有數百兵，并所新得，僅滿千人。曹仁乃令五六千人圍寧。寧受攻累日，敵設高樓，雨射城中，士衆皆懼，惟寧談笑自若。遣使報瑜，瑜用呂蒙計，帥諸將解圍。) Sanguozhi vol. 55.) Zhou Yu, Lü Meng and the others succeeded in lifting the siege at Yiling, while Ling Tong managed to hold his ground well for that period of time. Eventually, Cao Ren was ordered to abandon Nan Commandery because the prolonged war had drained much manpower and resources on Cao Cao's side, and this resulted in the capture of the commandery by Sun Quan's forces.

== Guan Yu's shallows ==
In 215, Sun Quan had disputes with his ally Liu Bei over the division of southern Jing Province between their respective domains. Sun Quan sent Lü Meng and Ling Tong to seize the three commanderies of Changsha (長沙), Lingling (零陵; around present-day Yongzhou, Hunan) and Guiyang (桂陽; around present-day Chenzhou, Hunan) from Liu Bei, and then ordered Lu Su to station at Yiyang as a precaution against any retaliation by Liu Bei's general Guan Yu, who was in charge of his lord's territories in southern Jing Province. Gan Ning joined Lu Su at Yiyang. Guan Yu claimed he had 30,000 troops as he selected 5,000 elite troopers to the upstream shallows located some 10 li away from Yiyang, and planned to cross the shallows at night. Lu Su held a discussion with his subordinates on how to deal with Guan Yu. At the time, Gan Ning had only 300 men under him and he told Lu Su,

"If you give me another 500 troops, I will go to confront Guan Yu. I assure you that Guan Yu won't dare to cross the waters when he hears of my approach. But if he does, I will capture him."

Lu Su then chose 1,000 troops and put them under Gan Ning's command. Gan Ning headed towards Guan Yu's position at night. As Gan Ning expected, Guan Yu did not cross the shallows and instead set up camps there. That place was thus named 'Guan Yu's Shallows' (關羽瀨). (Note: (羽號有三萬人，自擇選銳士五千人，投縣上流十餘里淺瀨，云欲夜涉渡。肅與諸將議。寧時有三百兵，乃曰：「可復以五百人益吾，吾往對之，保羽聞吾欬唾，不敢涉水，涉水即是吾禽。」肅便選千兵益寧，寧乃夜往。羽聞之，住不渡，而結柴營，今遂名此處為關羽瀨。) Sanguozhi vol. 55.)

Sun Quan was so pleased with Gan Ning's achievement that he appointed him as the Administrator (太守) of Xiling Commandery (西陵郡) and let him oversee the counties of Yangxin (陽新) and Xiazhi (下雉; east of present-day Yangxin County, Hubei). (Note: (權嘉寧功，拜西陵太守，領陽新、下雉兩縣。) Sanguozhi vol. 55.)

== Battle of Xiaoyao Ford ==
In 214, Gan Ning was involved in an attack on Cao Cao's garrison at Wan County (皖縣; in present-day Qianshan County, Anhui) and was in charge of the unit assigned to scale the fortress's walls. Armed with a chain, he was the first to climb up the walls and his men captured Wan County's defending commander, Zhu Guang (朱光). Lü Meng earned the top credit while Gan Ning received the second highest credit for the victory. Gan Ning was promoted to General Who Breaks and Charges (折衝將軍). (Note: (後從攻皖，為升城督。寧手持練，身緣城，為吏士先，卒破獲朱光。計功，呂蒙為最。寧次之，拜折衝將軍。) Sanguozhi vol. 55.)

Later that year, Gan Ning participated in Sun Quan's campaign to seize control of Hefei, which was defended by Cao Cao's general Zhang Liao. Sun Quan was unable to capture Hefei after besieging the city for days and suffering defeats in the initial skirmishes, and he eventually withdrew his forces when a plague broke out in his army. Sun Quan's other units retreated first, while Sun Quan himself remained behind at Xiaoyao Ford (逍遙津) with only about 1,000 men and a few officers (including Lü Meng, Jiang Qin, Ling Tong and Gan Ning). When Zhang Liao saw that, he seized the opportunity to launch a devastating counterattack and throw the enemy into confusion. Gan Ning led a group of archers to fire arrows at the enemy while Ling Tong and the others fought fiercely to protect their lord. Gan Ning shouted at the men to beat the war drums and blow the horns loudly to raise the army's morale. Sun Quan eventually succeeded in escaping but his forces sustained heavy losses. He praised Gan Ning for his acts of courage after the battle. (Note: (建安二十年，從攻合肥，會疫疾，軍旅皆已引出，唯車下虎士千餘人，并呂蒙、蔣欽、凌統及寧，從權逍遙津北。張遼覘望知之，即將步騎奄至。寧引弓射敵，與統等死戰。寧厲聲問鼓吹何以不作，壯氣毅然，權尤嘉之。) Sanguozhi vol. 55.)

== Battle of Ruxu ==
Two years later in 217, Cao Cao personally led an army, said to be 400,000 strong, to attack Sun Quan's garrison at Ruxu (濡須). Sun Quan led about 70,000 troops to counter the enemy. Gan Ning commanded the 3,000 strong vanguard. Sun Quan gave a secret order for Gan Ning to attack the enemy under the cover of nightfall, so Gan Ning selected 100 elite soldiers. (Note: (江表傳曰：「曹公出濡須，號步騎四十萬，臨江飲馬。權率衆七萬應之，使寧領三千人為前部督。權密勑寧，使夜入魏軍。寧乃選手下健兒百餘人， ...) Jiang Biao Zhuan annotation in Sanguozhi vol. 55.) Before the battle, Sun Quan sent food and wine to Gan Ning and his men. After the feast, Gan Ning poured wine into a silver bowl and drank two bowls before offering it to an officer. The officer knelt down and did not dare to take the bowl, so Gan Ning drew his sword, placed it on his lap and said: "You respect our lord but not me? I don't fear death. Why do you fear death?" The officer saw that Gan Ning was very stern so he obliged and drank from it and then ordered each soldier to drink one bowl of wine." (Note: (後曹公出濡須，寧為前部督，受勑出斫敵前營。權特賜米酒衆殽，寧乃料賜手下百餘人食。食畢，寧先以銀盌酌酒，自飲兩盌，乃酌與其都督。都督伏，不肯時持。寧引白削置膝上，呵謂之曰：「卿見知於至尊，孰與甘寧？甘寧尚不惜死，卿何以獨惜死乎？」都督見寧色厲，即起拜待酒次，通酌兵各一銀盌。) Sanguozhi vol. 55.)

When it was nearing midnight, Gan Ning and his 100 men raided Cao Cao's camp (Note: (至二更時，銜枚出斫敵。) Sanguozhi vol. 55.) and destroyed some defensive structures and killed dozens of enemy soldiers. Cao Cao's troops were shocked so they sounded the alarm and lit up the entire camp with torches. By then, Gan Ning and his men had already returned safely to their own camp, where they beat their drums, blew their horns, and shouted "wansui!" (Note: (... 徑詣曹公營下，使拔鹿角，踰壘入營，斬得數十級。北軍驚駭鼓譟，舉火如星，寧已還入營，作鼓吹，稱萬歲。) Jiang Biao Zhuan annotation in Sanguozhi vol. 55.)

Later that night, Gan Ning went to see a delighted Sun Quan, who told him: "Were your actions enough to frighten the old man (Cao Cao)? I had the opportunity of witnessing your valour." Sun Quan then rewarded Gan Ning with 1,000 rolls of silk and 100 swords. He also remarked, "Mengde (Cao Cao) has Zhang Liao while I have Xingba. I can match him." Cao Cao withdrew his armies from Ruxu after slightly more than a month. (Note: (因夜見權，權喜曰：「足以驚駭老子否？聊以觀卿膽耳。」即賜絹千匹，刀百口。權曰：「孟德有張遼，孤有興霸，足相敵也。」停住月餘，北軍便退。) Jiang Biao Zhuan annotation in Sanguozhi vol. 55.) Gan Ning commanded even greater respect among Sun Quan's forces and the number of troops under his command increased by 2,000. (Note: (敵驚動，遂退。寧益貴重，增兵二千人。) Sanguozhi vol. 55.)

== Death ==
When Gan Ning died, Sun Quan deeply lamented his death. (Note: (寧卒，權痛惜之。) Sanguozhi vol. 55.) No further details about Gan Ning's death were provided in his biography in the Sanguozhi. However, the Jiankang Shilu recorded that Gan Ning died in the winter of 215–216, while the Australian sinologist Rafe de Crespigny estimated that Gan Ning died around 220.

== Family ==
Gan Ning's ancestor was Gan Mao (甘茂), a chancellor of the Qin state in the Warring States period.

Gan Ning's son, Gan Gui (甘瓌), was exiled to Kuaiji Commandery (around present-day Shaoxing, Zhejiang) for committing an offence and died not long later. (Note: (子瓌，以罪徙會稽，無幾死。) Sanguozhi vol. 55.)

Gan Shu (甘述), another son of Gan Ning, served as a Master of Writing (尚書) in the state of Eastern Wu during the Three Kingdoms period. Gan Shu's son, Gan Chang (甘昌), served as the Crown Prince's Tutor (太子太傅) in Wu. Gan Chang had a son – Gan Zhuo (甘卓), whose courtesy name was Jisi (季思). Gan Zhuo served as Senior General Who Guards the South (鎮南大將軍) and Governor of Jing Province (荊州牧) during the Jin dynasty.

== Appraisal ==
Gan Ning was rough and violent; moreover he took pleasure in killing. However, he was also jovial, gregarious and capable of using strategy. (Note: (寧雖麤猛好殺，然開爽有計略，) Sanguozhi vol. 55.) He respected virtuous persons and had little regard for monetary wealth. He treated his men well and they were also willing to fight for him with their lives. (Note: (輕財敬士，能厚養健兒，健兒亦樂為用命。) Sanguozhi vol. 55.)

=== Conflict with Ling Tong ===
Ling Tong (Ling Cao's son) never forgave Gan Ning for killing his father at the Battle of Xiakou in 203. Gan Ning was always on the defensive against Ling Tong and deliberately avoided meeting him. Sun Quan also ordered Ling Tong to not seek vengeance on Gan Ning. There was one incident during a banquet held in Lü Meng's house, where both Gan Ning and Ling Tong were present. When Ling Tong was performing a sword dance to entertain the guests, Gan Ning stood up and said, "I can also perform with my pair of jis." Lü Meng told Gan Ning: "You may be good in performing, but you're not as good as me." He then drew his sword and carried a shield and stood between Ling Tong and Gan Ning to separate the two of them. When Sun Quan heard about the incident, he relocated Gan Ning to a garrison at Banzhou (半州). (Note: (吳書曰：凌統怨寧殺其父操，寧常備統，不與相見。權亦命統不得讎之。甞於呂蒙舍會，酒酣，統乃以刀舞。寧起曰：「寧能雙戟舞。」蒙曰：「寧雖能，未若蒙之巧也。」因操刀持楯，以身分之。後權知統意，因令寧將兵，遂徙屯於半州。) Wu Shu annotation in Sanguozhi vol. 55.)

=== Dispute with Lü Meng ===
One of Gan Ning's servants committed an offence and was afraid of being punished so he sought shelter under Lü Meng. Lü Meng feared that Gan Ning would kill the servant so he did not send the servant away. Later, when Gan Ning visited Lü Meng's house and brought along gifts for the latter's mother, Lü brought the servant out to meet Gan, and Gan promised to spare the servant. However, Gan Ning reneged on his word later as he tied the servant to a tree and personally killed him by firing arrows at him. After that, he went back to his boat and ordered his men to lengthen the hawsers while he undressed and rested inside the cabin. (Note: (寧廚下兒曾有過，走投呂蒙。蒙恐寧殺之，故不即還。後寧齎禮禮蒙母，臨當與升堂，乃出廚下兒還寧。寧許蒙不殺。斯須還船，縛置桑樹，自挽弓射殺之。畢，勑船人更增舸纜，解衣卧船中。) Sanguozhi vol. 55.)

Lü Meng was furious when he heard that Gan Ning had killed the servant so he gathered his own men and prepared to confront Gan. Gan Ning continued resting when he heard Lü Meng approaching. Lü Meng's mother came out of the house barefooted and chided her son: "The lord (Sun Quan) treats you like his family and entrusts you with important responsibilities. How can you kill Gan Ning just because you have a private feud with him? If Gan Ning dies, even if the lord does not inquire into the incident, you have already overstepped your role as a subject." Lü Meng was a filial son so his anger subsided after listening to his mother. He then went to Gan Ning's boat, laughed and said: "Xingba, my mother is treating you to a meal. Come up quickly!" Gan Ning wept and replied: "I have let you down." He followed Lü Meng to meet his mother and they feasted for the whole day. (Note: (蒙大怒，擊鼓會兵，欲就船攻寧。寧聞之，故卧不起。蒙母徒跣出諫蒙曰：「至尊待汝如骨肉，屬汝以大事，何有以私怒而欲攻殺甘寧？寧死之日，縱至尊不問，汝是為臣下非法。」蒙素至孝，聞母言，即豁然意釋，自至寧舩，笑呼之曰：「興霸，老母待卿食，急上！」寧涕泣歔欷曰：「負卿。」與蒙俱還見母，歡宴竟日。) Sanguozhi vol. 55.)

== In popular culture ==
=== In Romance of the Three Kingdoms ===
Gan Ning appears as a character in the 14th-century historical novel Romance of the Three Kingdoms, which romanticises the historical events before and during the Three Kingdoms period. Some of the actual events in his life are exaggerated or dramatised in the novel.

The description of Gan Ning's night raid on Cao Cao's camp at the Battle of Ruxu in the novel is more vivid as compared to that mentioned in his biography. Before the raid, Ling Tong leads 3,000 troops to engage the enemy and duels with Zhang Liao before he receives orders to retreat. When Gan Ning sees that, he tells Sun Quan: "Tonight I'll bring only 100 men to raid Cao Cao's camp. If I lose a single soldier, this won't count as a contribution." That night, he leads 100 horsemen to attack Cao Cao's camp and all of them return alive after inflicting heavy damage and casualties on the enemy.

Gan Ning kills Ling Tong's father, Ling Cao, at the Battle of Xiakou in 203. Since then, even after Gan Ning comes to serve Sun Quan, Ling Tong still holds a grudge against him. Their conflict is dramatised in chapters 67–68 of the novel, and is eventually resolved after Gan Ning saves Ling Tong's life. (Note: See Ling Tong#In Romance of the Three Kingdoms for details.)

Gan Ning's death is described in Chapter 83. He is killed at the Battle of Xiaoting by the tribal king Shamoke, an ally of Liu Bei. (Note: See Battle of Xiaoting#Gan Ning's death for details.)

=== Modern era depictions ===
Gan Ning is featured as a playable character in Koei's Dynasty Warriors and Warriors Orochi video game series.

Gan Ning is featured as a playable character in Total War: Three Kingdoms, serving under Liu Biao's faction.

== See also ==
- Lists of people of the Three Kingdoms

== Appendix ==
=== References ===
==== Chen Shou ====
- Chen, Shou (3rd century). Records of the Three Kingdoms (Sanguozhi).

==== Pei Songzhi ====
- Pei, Songzhi (5th century). Annotations to Records of the Three Kingdoms (Sanguozhi zhu).

=== Bibliography ===
- Fang, Xuanling (ed.) (648). Book of Jin (Jin Shu).
- Luo, Guanzhong (14th century). Romance of the Three Kingdoms (Sanguo Yanyi).
- Xu, Song (c. 8th century). Jiankang Shilu (建康實錄).
