= Mi Heng =

Chinese writer and musician (c.173–198)

Mi Heng 禰衡
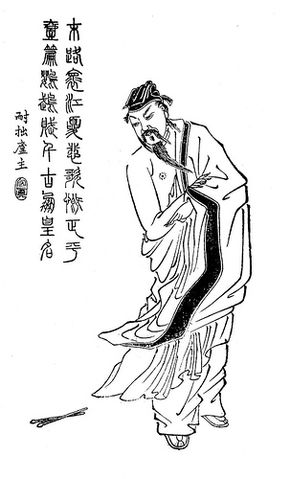
- A Qing dynasty portrait of Mi Heng
- Born: 173
- Died: 198 (aged 25)
- Other name: Zhengping (正平)
- Occupation: Scholar

Mi Heng
- Traditional Chinese: 禰衡
- Simplified Chinese: 祢衡
Transcriptions
Standard Mandarin
- Hanyu Pinyin: Mí Héng (Note: Some sources read his surname as "Ní".)
- Gwoyeu Romatzyh: Mir Herng
- Wade–Giles: Mi^{2} Heng^{2}
- IPA: [mǐ xə̌ŋ]
Yue: Cantonese
- Yale Romanization: Nèih Hàhng
- Jyutping: Nei^{4} Hang^{4}
- IPA: [nej˩ hɐŋ˩]
Southern Min
- Tâi-lô: Nî Hîng
Old Chinese
- Baxter–Sagart (2014): *m.ner [g]ˤraŋ

Zhengping (courtesy name)
- Chinese: 正平
Transcriptions
Standard Mandarin
- Hanyu Pinyin: Zhèngpíng
- Wade–Giles: Cheng^{4}-p'ing^{2}
- IPA: [ʈʂə̂ŋpʰǐŋ]
Yue: Cantonese
- Yale Romanization: Jing-pèhng
- Jyutping: Zing^{3}-peng^{4}
Southern Min
- Hokkien POJ: Chià^{n}-pê^{n}
- Tâi-lô: Tsiànn-pênn

Mi Heng (c. 173 – 198), courtesy name Zhengping, was an ancient Chinese writer and musician who lived in the late Eastern Han dynasty. He is best known for his fu rhapsody "Fu on the Parrot", which is his only work that has survived to modern times.

== Life ==
Mi Heng was born around 173 in Ban County (般縣), Pingyuan Commandery (平原郡), which is in present-day Shanghe County, Shandong. In the early 190s, Mi Heng, like many others, fled northern China to escape the chaos that broke out towards the end of the Han dynasty. He settled in Jing Province (covering present-day Hubei and Hunan) and joined the staff of its Governor, Liu Biao. Around 196, Mi Heng moved north to join the imperial court that the warlord Cao Cao had established in Xu (許; present-day Xuchang, Henan). Mi Heng was friendly with the prominent scholar Kong Rong, who wrote a memorial recommending him for imperial service and submitted it to Emperor Xian, who was then mainly a puppet ruler under Cao Cao's control. Mi Heng returned to Jing Province in 197, where he stayed until his death a year or two later.

Although Mi Heng was known as a gifted poet and talented writer, he was prone to erratic behaviour, offensive jokes, and an arrogant attitude that made him difficult to socialise with, and even caused some to question his sanity.

Upon arriving in Xu around 196, Kong Rong spoke highly of Mi Heng to Cao Cao, who summoned him for an audience. Mi Heng, however, had a low opinion of Cao Cao, and refused to attend. Cao Cao was outraged by Mi Heng's refusal, but refrained from punishing Mi due to his reputation as a talent. Mi Heng was known as a talented drummer, so Cao Cao invited him to perform with several other drummers at a banquet. Cao Cao provided special garments for the drummers to wear, but Mi Heng refused to wear the provided clothing and wore his own clothes when he performed in front of Cao Cao and the other high-ranking guests. When an attendant scolded him for not dressing appropriately, Mi slowly stripped, stood naked in front of Cao Cao and the other guests for a few moments, and then slowly put on the drummers' garments and continued performing without showing any embarrassment. Kong Rong arranged a second meeting between Mi Heng and Cao Cao, but Mi turned out to be just as offensive as he had been at the first meeting, so Cao Cao decided to send him back to Liu Biao.

Among Liu Biao's subordinates, Mi Heng was highly respected for his literary talents. However, he also criticised Liu Biao for being indecisive and offended most of Liu's other attendants with his arrogant attitude. Liu Biao tolerated him for a year before sending him to Jiangxia Commandery (江夏郡; around present-day Xinzhou District, Wuhan, Hubei) to serve its Administrator, Huang Zu. Huang Zu's son, Huang Yi (黃射), greatly admired Mi Heng. Huang Zu himself was also initially impressed by Mi Heng's intelligence and talent. However, Mi Heng got into trouble when he insulted Huang Zu in front of all of his officers at a banquet. Huang Zu ordered Mi Heng's execution, which was quickly carried out by a senior clerk who hated Mi Heng.

== Works ==
A library catalogue from the Liang dynasty recorded that a volume of Mi Heng's collected works existed in two rolls (juan), but this collection was already lost by the early Tang dynasty (early 7th century). Mi Heng's only surviving work is his "Fu on the Parrot" (Yingwu fu 鸚鵡賦), probably written in 198, which was collected and preserved in the Selections of Refined Literature. Two reliable English translations exist:

- Graham, William T. Jr. (1979), "Mi Heng's 'Rhapsody on a Parrot'", Harvard Journal of Asiatic Studies, 39 (1): 39–54, doi:10.2307/2718812, JSTOR 2718812.
- Knechtges, David R. (1996), "'Rhapsody on the Parrot', Mi Zhengping", Wen Xuan, or Selections of Refined Literature, Volume 3, Princeton: Princeton University Press, pp. 49–57.
