= Dong Xi =

General serving warlords Sun Ce and Sun Quan (died 217)

- 董襲

Lieutenant-General (偏將軍)
- In office c. 200s – 217

Colonel of Surpassing Might (威越校尉)
- In office ? – c. 200s

Commandant Who Spreads Martial Might (揚武都尉)
- In office ?–?

Personal details
- Born: Unknown; Yuyao, Zhejiang
- Died: 217 (Note: The Sanguozhi recorded that Dong Xi drowned when his ship sank due to a storm during a battle against Cao Cao's forces at Ruxu. There were more than one battle fought at Ruxu between Sun Quan and Cao Cao during that period. Dong Xi's biography did not state the year in which he died, and lacked details on the battle, so it cannot be accurately determined which Battle of Ruxu he died in. Rafe de Crespigny estimated in his A biographical dictionary of Later Han to the Three Kingdoms (23–220 AD) that Dong Xi died in 217.)
- Occupation: General
- Courtesy name: Yuanshi (元世)

Dong Xi (died 217), courtesy name Yuanshi, was a military general serving under the warlords Sun Ce and Sun Quan during the late Eastern Han dynasty of China.

== Service under Sun Ce ==
Dong Xi was from Yuyao County (餘姚縣), Kuaiji Commandery, which is present-day Yuyao, Zhejiang. He was eight chi tall (approximately 184–190 cm) and was described to be ambitious, generous and highly skilled in combat. In 196, after Sun Ce occupied Kuaiji during his conquests in the Jiangdong region, Dong Xi welcomed him at Gaoqian Village (高遷亭). Sun Ce was impressed with Dong Xi at first sight and recruited the latter to serve him. Dong Xi became a Chief Constable (賊曹) under Sun Ce. At the time, the bandits Huang Longluo (黃龍羅) and Zhou Bo (周勃) had gathered thousands of followers in Shanyin (山陰; in present-day Shaoxing, Zhejiang). Sun Ce led his army to attack the bandits. Dong Xi participated in the campaign and slew the two bandit chiefs in the midst of battle. For his achievements, he was promoted to Major of Separate Command (別部司馬), placed in charge of thousands of troops, and appointed as Commandant Who Spreads Martial Might (揚武都尉). He also joined Sun Ce in the campaigns against Liu Xun at Xunyang (尋陽) and Huang Zu at Jiangxia Commandery (江夏郡; around present-day Xinzhou District, Wuhan, Hubei).

After Sun Ce was assassinated in 200 CE, Lady Wu (the mother of Sun Ce and Sun Quan) was worried that Sun Quan, who had succeeded his elder brother, would be too young to handle the precarious situation in Jiangdong. She consulted Dong Xi about her concerns, and Dong reassured her by saying, "The lands in Jiangdong enjoy natural barriers from mountains and rivers, while the good government and virtue of Sun Ce have already won the hearts of the people. The young lord can build on these foundations so that everyone can follow his commands. Zhang Zhao can take charge of internal affairs, while others like me can serve as 'claws and teeth' (a euphemism for military servicemen). With both geographical advantage and popular support, there is certainly nothing to worry about." His positive speech was applauded by many.

== Service under Sun Quan ==
Once, Peng Hu (彭虎) from Poyang (鄱陽) rallied thousands of followers and started a rebellion against Sun Quan. Dong Xi, along with Ling Tong, Bu Zhi and Jiang Qin, led separate forces to attack the rebels. Dong Xi knocked down all opposition in his way, and Peng Hu fled when he recognised Dong's banner from a distance away. The revolt was suppressed within 10 days. Dong Xi was appointed as Colonel of Surpassing Might (威越校尉) and was later promoted to Lieutenant-General (偏將軍) for his efforts.

In 208, Sun Quan launched a punitive expedition against Huang Zu to avenge his father, who was killed in a battle against Huang around 17 years ago, leading to the Battle of Jiangxia. After losing his vanguard commander to Ling Tong, Huang Zu scuttled two mengchongs to block the channel across Miankou (沔口), and had a long rope made of coir-palm fibre secured across the gateway, with stones attached to the rope as anchors. In addition to all these defensive measures, Huang Zu also stationed more than 1,000 crossbowmen at Miankou, who rained arrows upon Sun Quan's forces when the latter attempted to push further. Dong Xi and Ling Tong were both commanders of Sun Quan's vanguard force. Each of them led 100 "commandos" wearing two layers of armour, boarded a large boat, and charged towards Huang Zu's mengchongs. Dong Xi managed to cut the rope with his sword and clear the blockade. The bulk of Sun Quan's army then resumed its advance. Huang Zu escaped through a gate but was pursued and killed by one of Sun Quan's horsemen. While Ling Tong, Dong Xi and others conquered Jiangxia and massacred his population. The following day, Sun Quan held a banquet to celebrate the victory, during which he toasted to Dong Xi, "The purpose of today's feast is to honour the person who cut the rope!"

In 217, when the warlord Cao Cao led an army to attack Sun Quan's fortress at Ruxu (濡須), Dong Xi accompanied Sun Quan to the frontline to resist the invaders. Dong Xi was appointed as the captain of a five-storey warship (五樓船) and ordered to defend the entrance to Ruxu. One night, a heavy storm broke out and threatened to capsize the warship. Dong Xi's subordinates evacuated the warship and boarded the smaller boats (走舸; zouges) and pleaded for him to join them. However, Dong Xi replied sternly, "I've received orders to defend this position from the enemy. How can I abandon my post like this? Anyone who dares to speak of this again will be executed!" He then remained alone on the ship, which eventually sank and brought him down as well. Sun Quan donned mourning attire and personally attended Dong Xi's funeral. He later gave out heavy rewards to Dong Xi's family to honour Dong's loyalty and courage.

== See also ==
- Lists of people of the Three Kingdoms
