= Ling Cao =

Military officer serving Sun Ce and Sun Quan (died 203)

- 凌操

Colonel Who Defeats Bandits (破賊校尉)
- In office late 190s – 203

Chief of Yongping (永平長)
- In office late 190s – ?

Personal details
- Born: Unknown
- Died: 203
- Children: Ling Tong
- Occupation: Military general

Ling Cao (died 203) was a Chinese military general serving under the warlords Sun Ce and Sun Quan during the late Eastern Han dynasty of China. He was the father of Ling Tong. He was killed by Gan Ning after his ambush at Xiakou.

== Service under Sun Ce ==
Ling Cao was known for his bravery and devotion to gallantry in his youth. When Sun Ce first raised his banner in 194, Ling Cao joined him and participated in the latter's conquests in the Jiangdong region. He fought for Sun Ce in various battles and always charged ahead of others on the field.

Within a few years, Sun Ce had completed the conquest of all of Yang Province; however, the restless Shanyue tribes in southeastern China continued to pose a threat to Sun Ce's administration. Sun Ce appointed Ling Cao as the Chief (長) of Yongping County (永平縣; in present-day Liyang, Jiangsu) to counter the Shanyue. During his tenure, Ling Cao pacified the Shanyue and maintained low crime rates in the region. He was promoted to Colonel Who Defeats Bandits (破賊校尉) for his achievements.

== Service under Sun Quan ==
After Sun Ce was assassinated in the year 200, Ling Cao continued serving under Sun Quan, Sun Ce's younger brother and successor. In 203, Sun Quan launched a campaign against Huang Zu, the Administrator (太守) of Jiangxia Commandery (江夏郡; around present-day Xinzhou District, Wuhan, Hubei), to avenge his father Sun Jian, whose death at the Battle of Xiangyang in 191 was caused by Huang. Ling Cao served as the vanguard of Sun Quan's fleet. Upon his arrival at Xiakou (夏口; present-day Hankou, Hubei), Ling Cao ordered a charge aimed at the enemy commanding unit. Ling Cao's uninterrupted dash broke the defence line immediately and threw Huang Zu's navy into confusion with his sudden attack. Ling Cao then advanced further on a light vessel, but was killed by a stray arrow in the midst of battle. The historical record Wu Shu (吳書; Book of Wu) by Wei Zhao claimed that Gan Ning fired the arrow.

Ling Cao's son, Ling Tong, became a prominent general under Sun Quan. Due to his father's death, Ling Tong bore a grudge against Gan Ning, who surrendered and came to serve Sun Quan.

== See also ==
- Lists of people of the Three Kingdoms
