= Ling Tong =

General serving under warlord Sun Quan (189–217)

- 凌統

Lieutenant-General (偏將軍)
- In office 215 – 217

General of the Household Who Defeats Bandits (蕩寇中郎將)
- In office 215

Chancellor of Pei (沛相) (nominal)
- In office 215

Colonel (校尉)
- In office 209 – 215

Commandant of Vehemence (承烈都尉)
- In office 208 – 209

Personal details
- Born: 189 (Note: Ling Tong's biography in the Sanguozhi recorded that he died at the age of 49 (by East Asian age reckoning). However, Lu (1982) and Liang (2000) pointed out that there was an error with the number '49' and that it should be '29' instead. According to Luo Tong's biography in the Sanguozhi, Luo Tong took over Ling Tong's military post after Ling's death and he participated in the Battle of Xiaoting in 222 later. This statement did not quite match what was written in Ling Tong's biography because his biography did not say much about what he did after the Battle of Xiaoyao Ford in 215. If he was involved in the Battle of Xiaoting, which was one of the major battles in that era, his participation would most certainly be mentioned in his biography. Besides, Ling Tong's biography also stated that his sons were still very young when their father died. Lu (1982) and Liang (2000) believed that it was more likely that Ling Tong died at the age of 29 (by East Asian age reckoning) in 217 than at the age of 49 in 237. The Jiankang Shilu also recorded that Ling Tong died at the age of 29 (by East Asian reckoning) in the 22nd year of the Jian'an era of the reign of Emperor Xian of Han.) Yuhang District, Hangzhou, Zhejiang
- Died: 217 (aged 28)
- Children: Ling Lie; Ling Feng
- Parent: Ling Cao (father)
- Occupation: Military general
- Courtesy name: Gongji (公績)

Ling Tong (189–217), courtesy name Gongji, was a Chinese military general serving under the warlord Sun Quan during the late Eastern Han dynasty of China. He started his service under Sun Quan when he was still a teenager and, throughout his entire life, had been contributing to the foundation and solidification of the state of Eastern Wu, which Sun Quan established in 229. He fought in numerous battles for his lord, including those against Huang Zu, Liu Bei and the Shanyue tribes, but is best known for his performance in the campaigns against Sun Quan's archrival Cao Cao, in which he displayed great skill and tact in extremely adverse situations.

Ling Tong received high praise from the scholar-gentry for his gracious demeanour, bonhomie and generosity. Despite having achieved fame and glory, when visiting his hometown later in his life, he treated commoners with respect and humanity. Behind the frontline, Ling Tong conceived a strategy for dealing with and pacifying the Shanyue tribes – impressing them with a show of military might and offering them potential rewards – which led to the Wu government recruiting over 10,000 Shanyue soldiers into their army and maintaining relative stability in the region. Due to his integrity and loyalty, Ling Tong, along with Lü Meng, was among Sun Quan's most valued generals.

== Early life ==
Ling Tong was from Yuhang County (餘杭縣), Wu Commandery, which is present-day Yuhang District, Hangzhou, Zhejiang. His father, Ling Cao, was a military officer serving under the warlord Sun Ce. Ling Cao held the rank of Colonel Who Defeats Bandits (破賊校尉) and continued serving Sun Quan after Sun Ce's death in the year 200. In 203, Sun Quan attacked Huang Zu, the Administrator of Jiangxia Commandery (江夏郡; around present-day Xinzhou District, Wuhan, Hubei). During the ensuing Battle of Xiakou, Ling Cao sailed alone a distance ahead on a small boat to infiltrate the enemy formation. Huang Zu abandoned his position and fled. Ling Cao was killed in the midst of battle by a stray arrow fired by Huang Zu's subordinate, Gan Ning.

Ling Tong was 15 (by East Asian reckoning) when his father died. Sun Quan appointed Ling Tong as a Major of Separate Command (別部司馬) in consideration of the fact that Ling Cao died in service of the Sun family. As many spoke well of Ling Tong's ability, the teenage Ling Tong was allowed to inherit his father's post, as acting Colonel Who Defeats Bandits, and assume command of the troops which used to be led by his father.

Ling Tong participated in a campaign against bandits in the hilly regions of Wu. Sun Quan's main force captured a bandit stronghold and left behind 10,000 men under the command of Ling Tong and Zhang Yi (張異) to lay siege to another stronghold. The day before the battle, Ling Tong and Chen Qin (陳勤) attended a banquet together. Chen Qin was in charge of ceremonial duties during the banquet, but he abused his powers and went against the rules. Ling Tong was upset by Chen Qin's insolence so he confronted him. In anger, Chen Qin hurled abuse at Ling Tong and even insulted Ling Tong's deceased father. Ling Tong was in tears but he refrained himself and did not respond to the acrimony.

After the banquet, Chen Qin, who was drunk, insulted Ling Tong again on the road. Unable to tolerate further abuse, Ling Tong injured Chen Qin with his sword. Chen Qin died a few days later. The next day, before the battle, Ling Tong exclaimed: "Only through death can my transgression be cleansed!" He charged ahead of his troops during the battle in the face of enemy arrows and boulders. The side of the garrison which Ling Tong's army attacked fell immediately. The other commanders were roused by his victory and together they inflicted a crushing defeat on the enemy. After returning from the battle, Ling Tong bound himself and surrendered to the disciplinary officer. Sun Quan was impressed with Ling Tong's strong determination and pardoned him for insubordination in consideration of his contributions.

== Battle of Jiangxia ==
In 208, Sun Quan attacked Huang Zu at Jiangxia Commandery (江夏郡; around present-day Xinzhou District, Wuhan, Hubei) again. Ling Tong was assigned as the leader of the vanguard force. He sailed in his boat far ahead of the main army with only tens of his closest men with him, and emerged victorious in the first engagement by slaying Huang Zu's subordinate, Zhang Shuo (張碩), and capturing all of Zhang Shuo's mariners with his much smaller force. He reported back to Sun Quan and led another attack on the enemy again, advancing on both land and water.

Knowing that Zhang Shuo had been slain and that the first line of defence had been broken, Huang Zu scuttled two of his largest mengchongs to block the entrance at the chokepoint of the Mian River, and sent his crossbowmen to station themselves there to fire at any approaching enemy forces. In addition, Huang Zu had strong men and archers ambushed on top of the cliff next to the river to throw down rocks and flaming debris. Sun Quan's forces firstly suffered great casualties and were unable to advance any further. Ling Tong and Dong Xi, along with 100 "commandos", donned two layers of armour each and charged towards the enemy despite the rain of rocks and arrows from the cliff and the fusillade from the vessels. They succeeded in breaking the connections between the two vessels after tough fighting, thus allowing Sun Quan's forces to break through and enter Miankou. Furthermore, the destruction of the mengchongs actuated Sun Quan forces' fighting spirit, and they emerged victorious in the next battle, in which Lü Meng defeated Huang Zu's navy while Ling Tong, Dong Xi and others conquered Jiangxia and massacred its population. Sun Quan appointed Ling Tong as a Commandant of Vehemence (承烈都尉).

== Battle of Red Cliffs ==
In late 208, the northern warlord Cao Cao launched a campaign aimed at wiping out opposing forces in southern China. He successfully pressured Liu Cong, who had succeeded Liu Biao as the Governor of Jing Province, into surrendering. A few months later, Cao Cao assembled a force of 800,000 at Jiangling County, where countless warships and weapons were stored, and sent an envoy to intimidate Sun Quan to give up resistance. Sun Quan eventually hardened his decision to go to war with Cao Cao after Lu Su and Zhou Yu convinced him. (Note: See Lu Su#Urging Sun Quan to resist Cao Cao and Zhou Yu#Advising Sun Quan to go to war with Cao Cao for details.) He then formed an alliance with another warlord, Liu Bei, to resist Cao Cao. Ling Tong, under Zhou Yu's command, participated in the Battle of Red Cliffs, in which the combined armies of Sun Quan and Liu Bei dealt Cao Cao's massive fleet a crushing defeat at Wulin (烏林).

== Battles in central Jing Province ==
Following the Battle of Red Cliffs, Zhou Yu led Sun Quan's forces to attack Nan Commandery (南郡; around present-day Jingzhou, Hubei), which was defended by Cao Cao's general Cao Ren. Zhou Yu sent Gan Ning to guard Yiling (夷陵; around present-day Yichang, Hubei), but Cao Ren ordered his subordinates to attack Yiling later. Gan Ning was under siege so he requested aid from Zhou Yu, who followed Lü Meng's plan to leave Ling Tong behind to defend their position while Zhou Yu and the other generals would lead reinforcements to help Gan. Ling Tong was left alone to engage the enemy in battle for about ten days under numerical disadvantage, but he managed to triumph against the odds by holding his ground firmly while his comrades were away. The battle dragged on until Cao Ren was eventually ordered to abandon Nan Commandery, resulting in the capture of the commandery by Sun Quan's forces. Ling Tong was promoted to Colonel (校尉) for his achievements in the battle

Ling Tong later moved east and followed Lü Meng and Gan Ning to attack Cao Cao's garrison at Wan County (皖縣; present-day Qianshan County, Anhui). They succeeded in conquering it. He was promoted to General of the Household Who Defeats Bandits (蕩寇中郎將) and was appointed as the Chancellor of Pei (沛相). In 215, Ling Tong joined Lü Meng in capturing Liu Bei's three commanderies of Changsha, Lingling and Guiyang. Later, they returned to Yiyang to counter an army led by Liu Bei's general Guan Yu, who was advancing south in an attempt to retake the lost commanderies. (Note: See Lu Su#Sun-Liu territorial dispute and Lü Meng#Sun-Liu territorial dispute for details.) The territorial dispute was eventually resolved when both Sun Quan and Liu Bei agreed to divide Jing Province between their respective domains along the Xiang River.

== Conflict with Gan Ning ==
Ling Tong had never forgiven Gan Ning for killing his father Ling Cao. Gan Ning was always on the defensive against Ling Tong and he tried to avoid meeting Ling whenever possible. Sun Quan also ordered Ling Tong to not seek vengeance on Gan Ning. Despite so, the two of them nearly exchanged blows in an incident during a banquet held in Lü Meng's house. When Ling Tong was performing a sword dance to entertain the guests, Gan Ning stood up and said: "I can also perform with my pair of jis." Lü Meng told Gan Ning: "You may be good in performing, but you aren't as good as me." He then drew his sword and carried a shield and stood between Ling Tong and Gan Ning to separate them. When Sun Quan heard about the incident, he reassigned Gan Ning to another garrison at Banzhou (半州).

== Battle of Xiaoyao Ford ==
After reaffirming his alliance with Liu Bei, Sun Quan personally led an army to attack Hefei, which was defended by Cao Cao's general Zhang Liao, in order to divert Cao Cao's attention away from Hanzhong Commandery. (Note: See the Hanzhong Campaign.) Ling Tong served as a Commandant of the Right Section (右部督) during this campaign. Sun Quan's forces suffered heavy losses in the early skirmishes against Zhang Liao and were unable to conquer Hefei. When a plague broke out among his troops, Sun Quan decided to give up on the campaign and retreat.

At Xiaoyao Ford (逍遙津), Sun Quan's other divisions retreated first while Sun Quan himself remained behind with about only 1,000 men and a few officers, including Lü Meng, Jiang Qin, Ling Tong and Gan Ning. When Zhang Liao saw that, he immediately led his troops out of Hefei to launch a counterattack and completely took Sun Quan by surprise. Sun Quan wanted to recall the divisions which had retreated first but realised they could not return in time. Ling Tong led 300 men to break into the enemy encirclement to rescue his lord. After Sun Quan managed to escape by making his horse jump across the broken bridge and reach the other side of the ford, Ling Tong returned to the battlefield and continued to fight on and slay dozens of enemies. He sustained several wounds all over his body and all his men were killed. He only retreated when he assessed the situation and concluded that Sun Quan was safe.

As the bridge had already been destroyed, Ling Tong had to wade through the water with his armour on. By then, Sun Quan had already boarded a ship and he was surprised and delighted to see Ling Tong still alive. Ling Tong was very saddened as all his close aides had died and he could not contain his sorrow. Sun Quan wiped Ling Tong's tears and said: "Gongji, let the dead go. As long as you live, why worry that you will have no men under you?" As Ling Tong's injuries were very severe, Sun Quan kept him on board the ship and let him have a change of clothing. With the aid of quality medicine, Ling Tong managed to survive. He was promoted to Lieutenant-General (偏將軍) later and given twice the number of troops he originally commanded.

== Pacifying the Shanyue ==
The Shanyue were tribal peoples rooted in the Wuyue region of ancient China during the Han dynasty. Since the southern part of China was not directly administered by the Han government even though it was Han territory in name, the Shanyue people performed regular raids against Han citizens to gather living essentials. The Shanyue had been a nuisance for the Sun family and their forces since they first set foot in Jiangdong.

Sun Quan had launched countless campaigns against them, but to no avail because the Shanyue had been living in the hills for a long time, were familiar with the area, and would go into hiding once they lost a battle. (Note: At the time, the Shanyue people would capitalise on their geographical advantage and hid in caves and deep hills, and would use crafty tactics to counter the Han government or Sun Quan's armies, so most officials considered pacifying them an impossible task. Quote from Sanguozhi vol. 64: (每致兵征伐，尋其窟藏。其戰則蜂至，敗則鳥竄......皆以為難。) For more details, see Sanguozhi vol. 64.) However, Ling Tong attempted a different approach to deal with the Shanyue. He proposed that Sun Quan attempt to win the hearts of the Shanyue and assimilate them instead of purely using military force to hamper them. He reasoned that if they could impress the Shanyue with the dignity of Sun Quan's administration and potential rewards, the Shanyue would succumb to them without bloodshed. After he was granted the staff of authority to request materiel from counties when required, he led a unit with flamboyant weapons and armour to begin his grand tactics. When the Shanyue discovered Sun Quan's forces after the latter had already ventured deep into their territories, they were indeed stunned by Ling Tong's unit; then Ling came out and told them if they would join Sun Quan's army, handsome rewards would be offered. Ling Tong's plan was a great success – tens of thousands of Shanyue men came out from their homes and joined him. He then selected 10,000 able-bodied men to form a unit and returned. Because of Ling Tong's success, his strategy would be adopted and modified by Zhuge Ke, another Wu general, at a later time.

== Death ==
During his journey to the Shanyue territories, Ling Tong passed by his hometown and stopped there for a visit. He treated the townsfolk with the utmost respect and humility even though he had achieved fame and glory. He died of illness on the return journey at the age of 28. When Sun Quan heard of Ling Tong's death, he was filled with grief for several days. In recognition of Ling Tong's contributions to his regime, Sun Quan ordered Zhang Cheng to write a eulogy for Ling Tong.

== Descendants ==
Ling Tong's two sons – Ling Lie (凌烈) and Ling Feng (凌封) – were both very young when their father died. Sun Quan brought them to his palace and treated them as though they were his sons. When guests came to visit him, he pointed at Ling Tong's sons and said: "They are my tiger boys." When Ling Tong's sons reached the age of seven or eight, Sun Quan ordered Ge Guang (葛光) to teach them to read and write, and train them in horse-riding every ten days. When Ling Lie became older, in recognition of his father's meritorious service, Sun Quan granted him the title of a village marquis (亭侯) and placed him in charge of the unit which used to be commanded by his father. Ling Lie lost his marquis title later and was discharged from service because he committed an offence; the title and military post were passed on to Ling Feng.

== Appraisal ==
Ling Tong respected and befriended members of the scholar-gentry. They admired him even though he was a military serviceman. Being receptive, he had a reputation for being accommodating towards men of talent. Even when he was busy with work, he always took time to receive visitors. He viewed righteousness and loyalty as important values and saw wealth as inferior. He was thus praised by Chen Shou as a guoshi. (Note: Guoshi (國士) could loosely translated as "gentleman of the state". It referred to persons who had made very outstanding contributions to their countries.) Once, Sun Quan's subjects recommended a famous talent, Sheng Xian, to him. Ling Tong was asleep when he heard that Sheng Xian had arrived to meet his lord. He immediately got out of bed to receive Sheng Xian and held Sheng's hand while leading him to meet Sun Quan. Note: This Sheng Xian (盛暹) is not the same person as Sheng Xian (盛憲) who was killed by Sun Quan.

Ling Tong was reputed to have a strong sense of righteousness. During the battle at Nan Commandery, Zhou Yu ordered Gan Ning to attack Yiling (夷陵; around present-day Yichang, Hubei). Cao Ren sent an army to attack Gan Ning and had him surrounded. Gan Ning hurriedly requested for reinforcements, but the generals did not have enough men to spare to save him and believed it was not sagacious to send reinforcements because that would dilute the main army. Lü Meng spoke up, saying that they should help Gan Ning. He proposed to Zhou Yu that Ling Tong stay behind to keep Cao Ren in check while the rest of the generals go to reinforce Gan Ning. Lü Meng boldly asserted that he had confidence that Ling Tong could hold on for ten days. Ling Tong then took up his duties with responsibility. He countered Cao Ren's attacks alone, and bought time for the other generals to rescue Gan Ning.

Ling Tong was also brave in admitting his mistakes and displayed fervent determination in his actions. In his earlier years, he struck down a superior officer called Chen Qin, who earlier insulted him and his late father. The incident caused Chen Qin to die of severe wounds several days later. Ling Tong then fought recklessly in the battle against the bandits after exclaiming that only through death could he cleanse his deep guilt. Thus, his attack turned out to be a huge success, yet he bound himself and surrendered to the discipline officer after the victorious battle to await his punishment. However, Sun Quan pardoned him on account of his achievements and promoted him to a higher military rank.

== In Romance of the Three Kingdoms ==
Ling Tong is a character in the 14th-century historical novel Romance of the Three Kingdoms, which romanticises the historical events before and during the Three Kingdoms period. Although his role in the novel is generally similar to that of his historical counterpart, his conflict with Gan Ning is highly dramatised.

In Chapter 67, during a banquet to celebrate their victory over Cao Cao's forces at Wan County, Ling Tong feels jealous when he sees Lü Meng praising Gan Ning so he offers to perform a sword dance and wants to use the opportunity to kill Gan Ning and avenge his father. Gan Ning senses Ling Tong's intention so he also offers to perform with his pair of jis. When Lü Meng realises that they are about to get into a fight, he draws his sword, carries a shield and stands in the middle to separate them. When Sun Quan hears about the incident, he comes to the banquet hall, orders them to lay down their weapons, and chides them for fighting among themselves. As Ling Tong kneels down and weeps, Sun Quan tries to calm him down and repeatedly urges him to stop provoking Gan Ning.

In Chapter 68, after the Battle of Xiaoyao Ford, when Ling Tong engages Yue Jin in a duel, Cao Xiu fires an arrow which hits Ling Tong's horse and causes Ling Tong to fall off the horse's back. Just as Yue Jin moves in for the kill, he suddenly gets hit by an arrow in the face. Both sides immediately rush forth to rescue their respective generals and withdraw their forces after that. Later, Ling Tong is surprised to learn that it was Gan Ning who saved him. He kneels down, thanks Gan Ning for saving his life, and begs for forgiveness. Gan Ning forgives him. Since then, Ling Tong forgets his past feud with Gan Ning and they become close friends.

== In popular culture ==
Ling Tong is featured as a playable character in Koei's Dynasty Warriors and Warriors Orochi video game series. He also appears in all instalments of Koei's Romance of the Three Kingdoms series.

== See also ==
- Lists of people of the Three Kingdoms
