= Chibi, Hubei =

Chibi 赤壁市
- County-level city
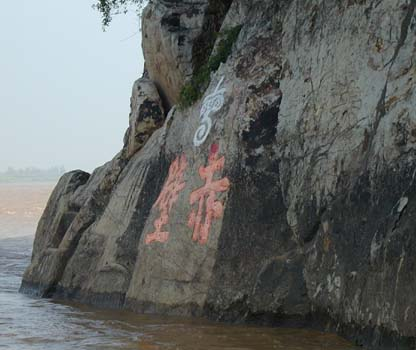
- Engravings on a cliffside near Chibi City

- Location in Hubei
- Coordinates: 29°43′N 113°54′E
- Country: People's Republic of China
- Province: Hubei
- Prefecture-level city: Xianning

Area
  - County-level city: 1,723 km^{2} (665 sq mi)
  - Urban: 51.20 km^{2} (19.77 sq mi)
- Elevation: 67 m (220 ft)

Population (2020)
  - County-level city: 470,355
  - Density: 273.0/km^{2} (707.0/sq mi)
  - Urban: 289,798
- Time zone: UTC+8 (China Standard)
- Area code: 437300
- Website: www.chibi.gov.cn

Chibi (Chinese: 赤壁; pinyin: Chìbì) is a county-level city in southeastern Hubei province, China. Neighboring Wuhan in the north and Yueyang in the south, Chibi is called the "South Gate of Hubei". It is under the administration of Xianning prefecture-level city. Chibi was called Puqi (蒲圻; Púqí) until 11 June 1998, when the State Council approved its renaming to "Chibi" since it was alleged as the site of the famous Battle of Chibi that took place in the winter of 208/9 CE.

Chibi has an area of 1,723 square kilometres (665 sq mi) and a population of 470,355 as of 2020.

== Population ==
In 1908 the entire county had a population of 185,004. In 1911 there were 42,455 families. In 1931, the county had 44,724 families and a population of 181,640. In 1953, after the first national population census, the county had 50,746 families and a population of 182,801. During the second national census in 1964, the county counted 58,055 families and a population of 248,391. 1961 to 1970 recorded the second largest population for the county (after the third national census) -- 75,560 families and a population of 387,789, where the birth rate was 18.24%, the mortality rate was 6.69%, and the growth rate was 11.7%.

In 1982, when the third national census took place, the county counted 385,662 Han Chinese people (99.45% of the population) and 2,131 minorities (0.55%) for a record total of 387,793. The minorities consisted of 1,929 Hui people, 51 Miao people, 49 Dong people, 21 Tujia people, 30 Zhuang people, 21 Manchu people, 6 Buyi people, 4 Tibetans, 3 Mongolians, 3 Yao people, 2 Uyghur, and 2 Korean.

== Administrative divisions ==
The administrative division of Chibi dates from the Song dynasty. From the Song dynasty to the Yuan dynasty, it was reclassified as a township. In the Ming dynasty, it divided into a capital system. From the Qing dynasty to 1932, it changed to a township and group system. After 1949, the government of Chibi set up a district office as the county agency, managing several townships and communes. In 1975 it dismantled the district to become a township but was restored to district status in 1984. In 1987 the district once again was changed to town status.

Chibi has jurisdiction over ten towns, a township, three subdistricts, an agriculture zone, three state-owned agriculture, forestry, tea, 152 village committees, and 1,682 village groups.

Three subdistricts:

- Puqi Subdistrict (蒲圻街道), Chimagang Subdistrict (赤马港街道), Lushuihu Subdistrict (陆水湖街道)

Ten towns:

- Xindian (新店镇), Zhaoliqiao (赵李桥镇), Cha'anling (茶庵岭镇), Chebu (车埠镇), Chibi Town (赤壁镇) (or 周郎嘴回族镇), Liushanhu (柳山湖镇), Shenshan (神山镇), Zhonghuopu (中伙铺镇), Guantangyi (官塘驿镇), Huanggaihu (黄盖湖镇)

The only township is Yujiaqiao Township (余家桥乡)

Other areas:

- Pufang Industrial Park (蒲纺工业园), Guantangyi Forestry (官塘驿林场), Yangloudong Tea Plantation (羊楼洞茶场), Canghu Development Area (沧湖开发区), Chibi Economic Development Area (赤壁市经济开发区)

== Climate ==
Climate data for Chibi, elevation 47 m (154 ft), (1991–2020 normals, extremes 1981–present)
Month	Jan	Feb	Mar	Apr	May	Jun	Jul	Aug	Sep	Oct	Nov	Dec	Year
Record high °C (°F)	24.6 (76.3)	29.5 (85.1)	35.5 (95.9)	36.0 (96.8)	36.6 (97.9)	38.6 (101.5)	41.2 (106.2)	41.3 (106.3)	39.2 (102.6)	36.2 (97.2)	32.7 (90.9)	25.7 (78.3)	41.3 (106.3)
Mean daily maximum °C (°F)	9.1 (48.4)	12.2 (54.0)	16.9 (62.4)	23.4 (74.1)	27.7 (81.9)	30.7 (87.3)	33.8 (92.8)	33.2 (91.8)	29.2 (84.6)	23.9 (75.0)	18.0 (64.4)	11.9 (53.4)	22.5 (72.5)
Daily mean °C (°F)	5.0 (41.0)	7.7 (45.9)	12.0 (53.6)	18.1 (64.6)	22.8 (73.0)	26.3 (79.3)	29.5 (85.1)	28.7 (83.7)	24.5 (76.1)	18.9 (66.0)	12.9 (55.2)	7.2 (45.0)	17.8 (64.0)
Mean daily minimum °C (°F)	2.1 (35.8)	4.5 (40.1)	8.4 (47.1)	14.1 (57.4)	18.9 (66.0)	22.9 (73.2)	26.1 (79.0)	25.4 (77.7)	21.0 (69.8)	15.4 (59.7)	9.4 (48.9)	4.1 (39.4)	14.4 (57.8)
Record low °C (°F)	−6.5 (20.3)	−7.5 (18.5)	−3.0 (26.6)	3.1 (37.6)	9.0 (48.2)	12.6 (54.7)	18.8 (65.8)	16.8 (62.2)	11.7 (53.1)	2.8 (37.0)	−1.9 (28.6)	−10.0 (14.0)	−10.0 (14.0)
Average precipitation mm (inches)	72.9 (2.87)	92.0 (3.62)	133.6 (5.26)	191.8 (7.55)	204.0 (8.03)	240.0 (9.45)	225.0 (8.86)	142.9 (5.63)	87.2 (3.43)	82.4 (3.24)	79.1 (3.11)	46.7 (1.84)	1,597.6 (62.89)
Average precipitation days (≥ 0.1 mm)	12.0	12.5	15.5	13.8	14.0	14.2	13.2	11.9	9.4	10.2	10.5	9.4	146.6
Average snowy days	4.6	2.4	0.7	0	0	0	0	0	0	0	0.2	1.4	9.3
Average relative humidity (%)	79	78	78	76	77	80	75	78	78	77	78	76	78
Mean monthly sunshine hours	84.3	84.9	105.8	131.5	148.3	143.7	201.6	192.1	148.2	136.7	121.4	111.2	1,609.7
Percentage possible sunshine	26	27	28	34	35	34	47	47	40	39	38	35	36
Source: China Meteorological Administration

== Historic sites ==
Yangloudong (羊楼洞), an old center of tea production and trade, is located in Zhaoliqiao town near Hubei's border with Hunan, some 26 kilometres (16 mi) southwest of downtown Chibi.
