= Mengchong =

2nd/3rd-century Chinese warship

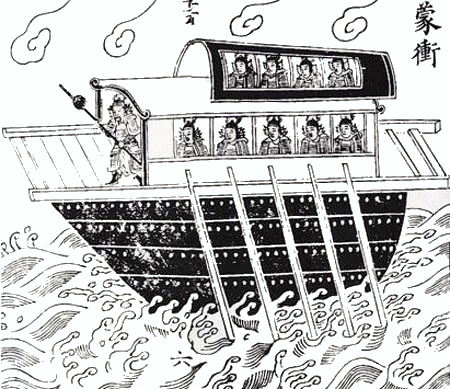
Mengchong

The Mengchong (traditional Chinese: 蒙衝; simplified Chinese: 蒙冲; pinyin: méngchōng) was a leather-covered assault warship used in China during the 2nd and 3rd centuries CE. Its use famously played an important role in the pivotal Battle of Red Cliffs during the winter of 208–209, in which Zhou Yu, the commander of Eastern Wu, ordered Huang Gai to use a group of mengchong loaded with flammable material to attack the fleet of Cao Cao with fire. Mengchong also saw later use in the navies of the Sui and Tang dynasties.

== See also ==
- Louchuan
