= Jiangxia Commandery =

Chinese commandery

Jiangxia Commandery (Chinese: 江夏郡) was a Chinese commandery that existed from Han dynasty to Tang dynasty. Its territories were located in present-day eastern Hubei province.

== History ==
Jiangxia Commandery was established during the reign of Emperor Wu of Han. In the Western Han dynasty, the commandery consisted of 14 counties: Xiling (西陵), Jingling (竟陵), Xiyang (西陽), Xiang (襄), Zhu (邾), Dai (軑), E (鄂), Anlu (安陸), Shaxian (沙羨), Qichun (蘄春), Meng (鄳), Yundu (雲杜), Xiazhi (下雉) and Zhongwu (鍾武). The total population in 2 AD was 219,218 individuals, in 56,844 households. During the Eastern Han period, Xiang and Zhongwu counties were abolished, while Pingchun (平春) and Nanxinshi (南新市) were added. By 140 AD, the population had grown to 265,464, in 58,434 households.

As the Han dynasty fell, Jiangxia was divided between Cao Wei and Eastern Wu. The seat was moved first to Shiyang (石陽, formerly part of Xiling County), and then to Anlu. In 221, Sun Quan added 4 counties of Jiangxia under his control to the newly formed Wuchang Commandery (武昌郡), with E as its seat. When Jin dynasty reunited China (280 AD), Jiangxia had 7 counties, namely Anlu, Yundu, Quling (曲陵), Pingchun, Meng, Jingling and Nanxinshi. The population was 24,000 households. Later, the commandery was further divided, and the seat was moved to Xiakou (夏口, in present-day Yunmeng County), where northern refugees from Runan were accommodated. In 464, the population was 23,810 individuals in 5,072 households. The commandery was abolished in early Sui dynasty.

In Sui dynasty and early Tang dynasty, Jiangxia Commandery became an alternative name of E Prefecture. The commandery administered 6 counties: Jiangxia (present-day Wuchang), Wuchang, Tangnian (唐年), Puqi (浦圻), Hanyang, and Chachuan (汊川). In 742, it had a population 84,563 individuals, in 19,190 households.
