= John Chaffee =

John Chaffee may refer to:

- John Chaffee (1823–1903), American gold miner who lived with his same-sex partner for over 50 years, see John Chaffee and Jason Chamberlain
- John W. Chaffee (born 1948), American historian of China

== See also ==
- John Chafee (1922–1999), American politician from Rhode Island
