= List of SD Gundam Sangokuden Brave Battle Warriors episodes =

The following is a list of episodes for the SD Gundam Sangokuden Brave Battle Warriors anime series, based on the SD Gundam model kit series BB Senshi Sangokuden.

There are two ending themes used. The first, "Mirisha Legend ~The Brave Legend~" (三璃紗伝說 ~The Brave Legend~), is performed by Ko-saku, and is used from episode 1 to episode 26. The second, "Justice ・Carve a Legend!" (Justice ・伝説を刻め！), is performed by Ryuubi (Yuuki Kaji), Kan-u (Hiroki Yasumoto), Chouhi (Masayuki Katou), Sousou (Kenji Nomura) and Sonken (Nobunaga Shimazaki), and is used from episode 27 onwards.

The anime has 4 distinct arcs:

The first, the Toutaku arc, lasts from episode 1 to episode 13, detailing the rise of various heroes to defeat Toutaku's tyranny.

The second, the Enjyutsu arc, lasts from episode 14 to episode 26, detailing the rise of warlords all over Mirisha, expanding their influence, and the rise of Enjyutsu after he unwittingly comes across the Gyokuji, which disappeared after the Toutaku arc.

The third, the Enshou arc, lasts from episode 27 to episode 39, detailing Enshou's rise to power after obtaining the Gyokuji from Enjyutsu.

The fourth arc, the Sousou arc, lasts from episode 40 to episode 51, detailing Sousou's ambition to unify the whole of Mirisha under his rule, that finally leads up to the climactic battle of Red Cliffs.

Each episode is about 15 minutes long.

== Episode list ==
=== SD Gundam Sangokuden Brave Battle Warriors ===
No.	Title	Original release date
1	"Birth of a Hero"; Transliteration: "Eiyuu Toujou" (Japanese: 英雄登場)	April 3, 2010
The story begins in Yuushu (幽州), where a couple of Yellow Scarves troops are harassing some villagers. Ryuubi Gundam steps in and easily chases off the two. He is thanked, and soon, Kousonsan Ez-8 arrives and comments on how Ryuubi should think before he acts. Kousonsan also informs Ryuubi of their Master, Roshoku GM Cannon, who will soon head out to subjugate the Yellow Scarves forces. Before he left, Roshoku presents the Ryuuteiken (龍帝剣) to Ryuubi. Ryuubi comments on how rusted it is, but Roshoku comments on how Ryuubi is still rooted to the village and unable to see past the rust, and that he should use the Dragon's Eye. After Roshoku left, Ryuubi climbs up a pagoda, and looks beyond the horizon, finally understanding Roshoku's words. However he spots a battle in the distance, and fears Roshoku's safety. Both Ryuubi and Kousonsan arrive at the scene to see a heated battle between Roshoku and Bagengi Zaku, however Roshoku is defeated in battle. Ryuubi steps in, and swears to serve justice in Mirisha, causing the Ryuuteiken to glow, and finally awaken. Ryuubi then proceeds to easily finish off Bagengi, and the remaining Yellow Scarves troops retreated. With his final words, Roshoku tells Ryuubi to explore Mirisha, and become a true dragon. Ryuubi decides to travel, while Kousonsan stays behind, inheriting Roshoku's stratagem scroll.
2	"Encounter"; Transliteration: "Deai" (Japanese: 出会い)	April 10, 2010
Ryuubi is travelling through a forest that lies south to his village, where he soon hears a battle. He soon sees two warriors engaging each other, one with red armour, and another with green armour. Ryuubi draws the Ryuuteiken to stop the battle, but it didn't awaken like when he was fighting against Bagengi. He decides to personally stop the two from fighting, but trips in the process. When he regains consciousness, the two warriors introduced themselves: The red one is called Chouhi Gundam, while the green one is Kan-u Gundam, though Chouhi prefers to call him Demon Beard. When asked why he wanted to stop the fight, Ryuubi commented on the Ryuuteiken, and deduced the two are not evil. Chouhi then takes Ryuubi on a tour around his village, stating that he has been protecting it against the Yellow Scarves. However, word soon arrives that a small army of Yellow Scarves has appeared just outside the village. Ryuubi, Chouhi and Kan-u rushes out in time to engage the Yellow Scarves army, led by Chouryou Messala, just outside the village. Chouhi and Kan-u easily defeats the troops with their finishing techniques, while Ryuubi repels them individually. Chouryou takes his chance while Ryuubi's back is exposed, but still fails. Ryuubi then proceeds to incapacitate him. When Kan-u decides to interrogate Chouryou to find the Yellow Scarves' stronghold, Chouryou used his witchcraft to escape. However, Ryuubi knows that their stronghold is in Eisen (潁川) from Roshoku, and the three sets out to defeat the Yellow Scarves once and for all.
3	"For the People"; Transliteration: "Tami no Tame ni" (Japanese: 民のために)	April 17, 2010
Ryuubi, Chouhi and Kan-u arrives at Eisen, but they spot other armies have already surrounded the Yellow Scarves' stronghold. These armies are part of the Imperial Subjugation Army, led by the general Shushun Zaku Cannon. Inside the stronghold, Chouryou, along with Choubou Bolinoak Samaan, are panicking over the sheer force of the army outside. However, Choukaku Palace Athene is not afraid, and has a plan to counter them. The East Wing of the army is led by Sousou Gundam, and decides to attack without Zhu Jun's order. The West Wing is led by Sonken Zephyranthes, and he too decides to attack. The two wing armies attack, and Chouhi wants to join in the battle. However Ryuubi stops him, saying that something is amiss. Back at the Main camp, Shushun is enraged at the unannounced attack from the wing armies. The two wing armies soon realize that the Yellow Scarves defense is spread too wide, and the invasion seems too easy. The Chou brothers have escaped. Back at the Main camp, Shushun is getting impatient, but soon his troops ran when the Chou Brothers forced their way through, defeating him. The Chou Brothers believed they have escaped successful, but they are soon stopped by Ryuubi, Chouhi and Kan-u. Chouryou exclaimed that these are the ones that defeated him, and Choukaku decides to show their true power. The Chou Brothers combine to form the powerful Kouten The. O, and easily overpower the three. Ryuubi, Chouhi and Kan-u stands up, and are filled with a strong sense of justice to defeat Kouten, which leads to their own combination, the Trinity. Ryuubi in Triniy form finishes off Kouten, while Sousou and Sonken Zephyranthes marvel at the power. Soon after, Ryuubi, Chouhi and Kan-u swear an oath of brotherhood in the Peach Garden.
4	"Assassin"; Transliteration: "Ansatsusha" (Japanese: 暗殺者)	April 24, 2010
At the capital Rakuyou (洛陽), Ryofu Tallgeese has infiltrated the palace of Reitei Gundam, the Emperor of Mirisha. Leaving dead bodies in his wake, Ryofu proceeds to kill Reitei. Toutaku Zaku praised Ryofu for his efforts, and proceeds to take the Gyokuji (玉璽), proclaiming himself the new ruler of Mirisha. Outside the palace, Ryofu encounters Chou-sen Qubeley, who calls him Housen (奉先). Chou-sen is concerned about Ryofu letting Toutaku seize the Gyokuji, but Ryofu replies his only goal in life is to seek out strong warriors to quench his battle-hungry soul. Over at Sousou's camp just outside Rakuyou, Sousou watches on as Kakouton Giros is enraged at Toutaku's plot, while Kakouen Daras feels helpless about the situation. However, they are soon greeted by a wandering strategist, Shiba-i Sazabi. He brings a treasure, the Shichiseiken (七星剣), and believes that this can whet Toutaku's appetite, and be allowed an audience with him. Sousou presents the Shichiseiken to Toutaku, who is very pleased with it, and wants Sousou to bring it to him. Sousou takes this chance to draw the Shichiseiken on Toutaku, only to be interfered by Ryofu. The two have a fierce battle outside, and Ryofu comments that Sousou is the one he's been seeking. The two continue to battle, until they both use their finishing techniques which clashed. In the resulting smokescreen, Sousou retreats, and Ryofu is satisfied. Chou-sen comments that Sousou is a frightening opponent. Back at his camp, Sousou returns the Shichiseiken, and swears in front of his army to form an alliance to overthrow Toutaku.
5	"The Heroes Gather"; Transliteration: "Gunyuu Shuuketsu" (Japanese: 群雄集結)	May 1, 2010
The Anti-Toutaku Alliance is formed, and Ryuubi, Chouhi and Kan-u make their way to the Alliance campsite. Once there, they meet up with Kousonsan, who joins his father's army in the Alliance. Ryuubi introduces Chouhi and Kan-u to Kousonsan, who makes a comment that the three combined has the strength of one hundred men. Sousou and Sonken Zephyranthes also welcomes the sworn brothers' arrival. However Enjyutsu Zssa, the second-in-command of the Alliance, is not pleased. A small squabble between Chouhi and Enjyutsu starts, until Enshou Bawoo, the commander of the Alliance steps in. Enshou comments on how the En family is privileged to lead the Alliance, and that he doesn't not need backwater peasants in his Alliance. He is soon interrupted by word that Toutaku forces has attacked the campsite. Kayuu Zanneck is the one attacking the campsite, and makes short work on some of the Infantry GMs. He then approaches Enshou and Enjyutsu, to which Enjyutsu ran off, leaving Enshou to face Kayuu. Ryuubi steps in to protect Enshou, and thus, a battle soon begins. Kayuu is overwhelmed by the sworn brothers' finishing techniques, but still manages to make his escape. The sworn brothers give chase, but Kayuu soon arrives at the Koroukan (虎牢関), an impenetrable fortress that leads into the capital Rakuyou. Unless the Koroukan is captured, there's no way to defeat Toutaku. Back at the Alliance campsite, Enshou officially enlists Ryuubi, Chouhi and Kan-u into the Anti-Toutaku Alliance.
6	"Capture the Koroukan"; Transliteration: "Mejirushi wa Koroukan" (Japanese: 目標は虎牢関)	May 8, 2010
The episode begins with Sonshoukou Gerbera rushing towards the Anti-Toutaku campsite. At the campsite, Sonken Gundam is mopping about the coming battle. Both Sonsaku Physalis Gundam and Kougai Gouf are dismalled at Sonken, trying to get him to man up. Sonken Zephyranthes steps in, stating that they will take the initiative to break through Koroukan. At this point, Sonshoukou arrives, much to the dismay of Sonken Zephyranthes, Sonken, Sonsaku and Kougai. She wants to be accomplished in battle as well, and begins to show her finishing technique. Though she was initially skillful at it, it soon turned disastrous. Not long after, the Son army begins their attack on the Koroukan, as Sousou watches on behind. From atop the Koroukan, Kayuu notices that the advancing force is not Ryuubi, and rushes into battle, thinking he will win. He notices Sonshoukou, and decides to take care of her first. Sonshoukou counters, but is easily overpowered. Before Kayuu can finish her off, Sonken rushes in to protect her, although visibly shaking under Kayuu's strength. Sonken Zephyranthes calls Kougai to bring in his blade, the Koteitou (虎錠刀), and proceeds to finish off Kayuu with his finishing technique. With the battle won, Sonshoukou thanks Sonken, and Sonsaku praises him for his effort. Kougai comments that one day, Sonken will succeed the Koteitou. At the Koroukan, Ryofu commends on Sonken Zephyranthes' strength, but he only wants to duel Sousou.
7	"Clash! Sousou vs Ryofu"; Transliteration: "Gekitotsu! Sousou tai Ryofu" (Japanese: 激突！曹操対呂布)	May 15, 2010
With the defeat of Kayuu, Ryofu jumps out from the Koroukan, preventing the Son army from advancing any further. He only wants to duel Sousou, who promptly steps forward. However, Ryofu's strategist, Chinkyuu Mercurius steps in and uses his strategem of fire, a stratagem where he has doused the land with oil, to burn the advancing force. But Shiba-i has anticipated this attack, and reversed it with his own stratagem, burning Chinkyuu with his own flame. Soon, Koushun Vayeate and Chouryou Gelgoog step in to take down Sousou. However, Kakouton and Kakouen step in to protect Sousou. Ryofu grows tired, and attacks, injuring Kakouton's left eye. Sousou orders Kakouton to step down. The duel between Ryofu and Sousou begins, each giving it their all. At a deadlock, Ryofu calls for his steed Sekitoba (赤兎馬), while Sousou calls for his steed Zetsuei (絶影), and the duel continues on horseback. Sousou seems to have an advantage when Chou-sen steps in with her butterflies illusion. Ryofu takes this chance to overpower Sousou. Although she helped Ryofu, he warned Chou-sen to not interfere in his battles again. Ryofu then proclaims that with him here, no one will get past him and the Koroukan.
8	"The Fearsome Generals Battle!"; Transliteration: "Tagire! Senritsu no Boushou" (Japanese: たぎれ！戦慄の暴将)	May 22, 2010
Back at the capital Rakuyou, Toutaku comments with Ryofu at the Koroukan, no one will pass. Riju Shokew, Toutaku's strategist comments that with the gathering of various heroes in the Alliance, Ryofu might be overpowered eventually. This leads to Toutaku commenting that it's Riju's job to make sure Ryofu doesn't fall. At the Koroukan, Ryofu stands guard as Chou-sen comments on Toutaku again. Ryofu gives the same reply, saying that all he doesn't care about Toutaku, all he cares about are battles. Over at the Alliance campsite, Kousonsen is arguing with Enshou about the next plan of action. That is until Ryuubu steps in and requests that he, Chouhi and Kan-u will take down Ryofu. The duel with Ryofu begins, and Kousonsan requests that Enshou send in his troops while Ryofu is distracted. However, Enshou comments that he will only do that when Ryofu falls in battle. Ryofu easily overpowers the sworn brothers, cutting off Chouhi's right shoulder armour, and laughs at their justice. However, Ryuubi comments that Ryofu's justice is false, and summons the Trinity form. He overpowers Ryofu, who is shocked at Ryuubi's strength being able to force him to his knees. Before Ryuubi can deal the finishing blow, Chouryou interferes, along with Chou-sen. The Koroukan has fallen under Sousou's and Sonken Zephyranthes' forces while Ryofu is distracted. Ryofu retreats with Chou-sen on Sekitoba in chariot mode. With the battle won, Enshou and Enjyutsu gloats, and Kousonsan thanks the sworn brothers for their hard work.
9	"In Flames! Capital of Light"; Transliteration: "Enjou! Hikari no Miyako" (Japanese: 炎上！光の都)	May 29, 2010
A mysterious traveller, Koumei Re-GZ, has arrived at the capital Rakuyou. He is in search of the source of darkness that has shrouded the whole of Mirisha, and sends out his Bakuoki (爆凰機). At the imperial palace, Jyokou Serpent is informing Toutaku on Ryofu's defeat. Ryofu steps in, accepting his failure at the Koroukan. Toutaku is furious, until Riju steps in with a new plan. They are to retreat to the Biujiyou (郿宇城) at Chouan (長安), and to set Rakuyou ablaze for the Alliance. Jyokou is strongly against this plan, thinking about the citizens, but Toutaku cares not of the citizens. Chou-sen comments on how both Toutaku and Riju seem to be possessed. Bakuoki returns, informing Koumei that the Gyokuji in Toutaku's possession is the source of the darkness. However he is caught by two of Toutaku's guards. Koumei easily takes care of the two, and leaves. At the Alliance campsite, Shiba-i reads out the G Chronicles, about the Gyokuji, and the power it gives to those who possesses it. Enshou and Enjyutsu vow to have the Gyokuji in their possession. Shiba-i carries on about the Tengyokugai, temporal armours that are bestowed on the worthy, that has the power to level entire cities. Sousou, Sonken Zephyranthes and Ryuubi vow to never let such power fall into Toutaku's hands. They all begin their trek towards Rakuyou, only to be greeted by the sight of the capital totally engulfed in flames.
10	"Sonken Dies"; Transliteration: "Sonken Shisu" (Japanese: 孫堅死す)	June 5, 2010
As the Son army witnesses the capital in flames, Shuuyu Hyakushiki spots Toutaku escaping in his chariot. Sonken Zephyranthes orders his army to chase after Toutaku, and to regain the Gyokuji. As the troops leave, Shuuyu requests Enjyutsu and his troops for rear support, and leaves. However, Enjyutsu grows paranoid, thinking that if Sonken Zephyranthes defeats Toutaku, the Gyokuji will be in his hands, and become ruler of Mirisha. Enjyutsu doesn't want that to happen, and orders his general, Kirei Hamma Hamma, to attack the Son army. As Sonken Zephyranthes catches up with Toutaku, he orders Ryofu to take care of the Tiger of Koutou, to redeem his honour. At the Son army's rear, Kirei catches up, and labels them as traitors. Sonsaku is enraged at that comment, while Kirei continues to say that only Enjyutsu is worthy of the Gyokuji. A battle ensues, and Sonken Zephyranthes notices Enjyutsu's betrayal and rushes back, only to be stopped by an advancing Ryofu. Ryofu attacks, but Sonken Zephyranthes manages to block his attack, though he is visibly injured. Sonken Zephyranthes continues to fight in his injured state, but he is no match for Ryofu, who then swiftly finishes off Sonken Zephyranthes and leaves. Kirei retreats as well, seeing that Ryofu has won. The rest of the Son army rushes to Sonken Zephyranthes' side, as he delivers his final words to his children, and dies. As the rain falls on Rakuyou, Sonken cries out in agony.
11	"Chou-un Joins!"; Transliteration: "Chouun Suisan!" (Japanese: 趙雲推参！)	June 12, 2010
Back at the Alliance campsite, Kousonsan and the sworn brothers hear the news of Sonken Zephyranthes' death, and how the Son army, now under Sonsaku, is still giving chase after Toutaku. The four decide to join up with the Son army to back them up. At the main gate to Rakuyou, the four are stopped by Chou-un Gundam, an officer under Enshou. Enshou has barred anyone from supporting the Son army's chase. Angered by this, Ryuubi draws his sword, to which Chou-un draws his spear. They both discuss how a soldier should follow a commander's orders and how one should always support their allies. Kousonsan steps in and agrees with Ryuubi's point of supporting one's allies. At this point, Chou-un succumbs, but he will personally escort them. At this point, Enshou arrives, and brands Kousonsan and the sworn brothers as traitors for going after the Gyokuji. Chou-un steps in to speak up for the four, but is threatened to be labelled as a traitor as well by Enshou. Seeing that Enshou's greed for the Gyokuji has blinded his judgement, Chou-un decides to rebel against Enshou, successfully countering Enshou's troops. Seeing this, Enshou retreats, vowing revenge for this betrayal. Chou-un then decides to join Kousonsan's army, as the five set forth to the Biujiyou in Chouan.
12	"On the Eve of the Final Battle"; Transliteration: "Kessen Zenya" (Japanese: 決戦前夜)	June 19, 2010
The Anti-Toutaku Alliance, minus Enshou and Enjyutsu, makes their way towards the Biujiyou, where Toutaku currently resides. Kousonsan decides to take a rest before crossing a river, and announces that they will begin their attack at dawn the next day, where they will rendezvous with Sousou's and Sonsaku's armies. Ryuubi decides to take this chance to fish for food. At the riverside, Ryuubi meets Koumei, and finds out that the fish are not biting. Koumei comments that perhaps a large fish has eaten the smaller fish, and Ryuubi states that if he catches that fish, the river will be at peace again. Koumei asks what if about large fish invades, and Ryuubi states he will catch that too. Koumei laughs. When Chouhi searches for Ryuubi, Koumei mysteriously disappears. Night falls, and the three factions prepare for the coming final battle, each having a common goal to defeat Toutaku, which results in the Gyokuji glowing brightly with a pure light. Dawn arrives, and the three factions rendezvous with each other, and prepare to attack. Ryofu also prepares to move out, and is accompanied by Chou-sen, Chouryou, Chinkyuu and Koushun. At the Biujiyou, Riju prepares the ballistic arrow cannons. Jyokou pleads with Toutaku to not fire those cannons, as it will also harm Ryofu and his army. Toutaku cares not of Ryofu, and proceeds to throw Jyokou overboard. As the Ryofu forces and the Anti-Toutaku Alliance are about to clash, Jyokou is shown to have survived the great fall, and watches in horror as Toutaku orders the cannons to fire, and the episode ends with ballistic arrows raining down on the battlefield.
13	"It Descends! The Tengyokugai"; Transliteration: "Hatsugeki! Tengyokugai" (Japanese: 発現！天玉鎧)	June 26, 2010
Ryofu is engaged in battle with Sousou and Sonsaku, just before the arrows rained down. As they did, many of the Infantry GMs and Zakus are hit. Sonken rushes in to protect Sonshoukou, while the other generals watched in disbelief. Kan-u comments on how tyrannical Toutaku is to injure his own troops, just as Ryofu is hit. The arrow volley continues and more are killed. When the volley stops, the battlefield is filled with corpses from both sides. Ryofu still stands, and pulls out the arrows on his back, demanding to finish the battle with the heroes. Toutaku comments on how Ryofu has served him well up till now, but it's time for him to be wiped out with the Alliance. Toutaku aims, and fires his shoulder cannons. Chou-sen and Chouryou rush in to protect Ryofu, but are hit squared on. As the two faint, Ryofu is enraged at Toutaku. The Gyokuji begins to glow, and flies out of Toutaku's hands, signalling the arrival of the Tengyokuyai. Shiba-i marvels at the sight, contemplating on which form the Tengyokuyai will take. Ryofu appears in front of Toutaku, and grabs the Gyokuji, summoning the Tengyokuyai in Shinbu (真武) form. Shiba-i is taken back by this turn of events, as Ryofu rushes in, finishing Toutaku off once and for all. The Tengyokuyai also proceeds to decimate the Biujiyou, killing Riju as well. When the dust settles, a huge crater sits where the Biujiyou used to be, and the Tengyokuyai has disappeared, along with Ryofu. The heroes celebrate their victory as peace is finally restored. In the distance, the Gyokuji flies off into the sky. Somewhere else, Koumei notices the smoke from the Biujiyou, and comments that the star of tyranny has fallen, and that peace has returned to Mirisha.
14	"Ryuubi Departs"; Transliteration: "Ryuubi Shuttatsu" (Japanese: 劉備出立)	July 3, 2010
The sworn brothers are back in Yuushu, having been granted new armour. Chouhi and Kan-u are fishing, while Ryuubi rests under a tree, thinking wherever they have finally brought peace back to Mirisha. He is soon interrupted by word that an Ugan (烏丸) army is just outside the village. The sworn brothers rushes out, and soon encounter the Ugan army, being led by Touton Memedorza. A battle soon breaks out. Soon after, Kousonsan arrives, with Chou-un by his side. Kousonsan comments that even though the sworn brothers are strong, they can still be overpowered by the Ugan, and that with Roshoku's stratagem scroll, they can help the sworn brothers. Back at the battle, the sworn brothers are getting tired from the endless attacks of the Ugan. Chouhi and Kan-u then spots something in the distance, which reveals to be Chou-un on his steed Hieisen (飛影閃). Kousonsan calls forth the Hakuba Jin (白馬陣, Formation of the White Stallion), the stratagem contained within Roshoku's scroll, which easily defeats the Ugan. Touton is then finished off by Chou-un. After discussions with Kousonsan, Ryuubi decides to depart from Yuushu again, to help any people in need.
15	"Rulers and Subjects"; Transliteration: "Tsuyoki Mono to Yowaki Mono" (Japanese: 強き者と弱き者)	July 10, 2010
Ryuubi, Chouhi and Kan-u are travelling, when they collapsed from hunger in front of Joshuu (徐州). The villagers welcomed them into the village and fed them up. They are in the residence of Touken GM, the Governor of Joshuu. Though sickly due to old age, Touken warmly welcomes the sworn brothers to stay, after hearing Ryuubi's ambition of helping people in need. Just then, a report of the scouts states that a large army is approaching from the west. Ryuubi, Chouhi and Kan-u steps up to help ward off the army. The army is led by Sousou, who has also been granted new armour. Sousou desires everlasting peace, true peace that is maintained by force. Ryuubi disagrees with Sousou's view, saying that it's just the same as Toutaku's rule. The two then battle it out. At a draw, Sousou retreats, much to the relief of Ryuubi. However, there's trouble with Touken. Touken is nearing his last breath, but he worries about the next Governor of Joshuu. He decides to let Ryuubi be the next Governor, and wishes to see Joshuu having continued peace and happiness. Touken dies soon after. With heavy hearts, Ryuubi contemplates why he was chosen by Touken while the villagers urge him to fulfill Touken's last words. Kan-u comments that the people who requires their help is right in front of their eyes. Ryuubi, finally understanding Kan-u's words, becomes the new Governor of Joshuu.
16	"Mirage of Terror"; Transliteration: "Senritsu no Gen'ei" (Japanese: 戦慄の幻影)	July 17, 2010
At Kyoshou (許昌), Sousou is having a council meeting with his generals. Kakouen is asking what is their stance on Ryuubi, to which Sousou replies he's the enemy. Kakouton believes that they need to amass more in strength to make Sousou's ambition a reality, to which, the possibility of harassing the Tengyokuyai's power. However, Jyokou, now serving under Sousou, disagrees, saying that such power is too dangerous. Shiba-i leaves the council, and meets with his disciple Kakuka Virsago. Kakuka does not believe in Shiba-i's view that Sousou is a successor that can summon the Tengyokuyai. However, Shiba-i rebutes that the three forms of the Tengyokuyai, the Souryuu, Enhou, and Douko, each represents a successor, to which Ryofu's summoned form isn't. Their discussion was cut short by an attack. A wall was blown straight off, and the attacker is Ryofu, who claims he's a God of Hell, and proceeds to duel with Sousou. Initially, they are evenly matched, until they unleashed their finishing techniques. Ryofu managed to damage Sousou, much to Sousou's surprise. Ryofu leaves, and reveals that the whole of his unit: Chou-sen, Chouryou, Chinkyuu and Koushun, survived the destruction of the Biujiyou. And they now serve under someone that wants Sousou dead. Even though Sousou is defeated, he vows to carry on his ambition, and that his will is that of the heavens. Kakuka now believes in Shiba-i's view. At the end of the episode, it is revealed that Ryofu now serves Enjyutsu, who has the Gyokuji in his possession.
17	"New Home"; Transliteration: "Shintenchi" (Japanese: 新天地)	July 24, 2010
The Son Army, led by Sonsaku, are making their way towards Choukou (長江), a river near Koutou (江東), hoping to settle down and establish their new home. Sonken contemplates on whether this is all necessary, much to the dismay of Sonshoukou. By the river-side, Rikuson Zetaplus is fishing, when he is interrupted by some Pirate Aesculapius. Sonshoukou steps in, to which the Pirates shrug off. When the rest of the Son Army steps in, they fled. Rikuson thanks Sonshoukou, to which she asks where his parents are. Rikuson sadly replied that they died, and thought that with Toutaku's death, peace will reign over Mirisha. Sonshoukou then invites Rikuson into the family, hoping to bring peace back to Koutou, to which Rikuson happily agrees. Soon after, the Pirates return, only to beg for their help. They are being chased after by Taishiji Dom, a warrior of Koutou. Taishiji calls out the leader of the Son Army, to which Sonsaku steps out, and challenges him to a duel. Sonsaku accepts, and a fierce duel commences. Both are even matched, even after using their finishing techniques. Sonsaku calls Kougai to bring out the Koteitou, and easily overpowers Taishiji. After witnessing his tenacity, Sonsaku invites Taishiji to join them, to which Taishiji refuses and leaves. Sonshoukou is worried about letting Taishiji go, but Sonsaku assures her that Taishiji is always welcomed a rematch.
18	"Little Conqueror of Koutou"; Transliteration: "Koutou no Shou Haou" (Japanese: 江東の小覇王)	July 31, 2010
In Jushun (寿春), Enjyutsu is informed of Sonsaku's position in Koutou by Kirei. Enjyutsu grows paranoid, thinking that Sonsaku is making his way to Jushun to take the Gyokuji. Kirei proposes that they send out their naval fleet, the greatest in all of Mirisha, to take out Sonsaku. When Kirei leaves, Enjyutsu proclaims that only he is allowed to be Emperor, to which the Gyokuji glows with a dark aura again. Over at Koutou, Rikuson is preparing some food for the villagers and the Son Army, when scouts alert them of incoming warships along the Choukou. Sonken takes a look, and notices the emblem of Enjyutsu, with Shuuyu noticing Kirei commanding the fleet. Sonsaku swears vengeance for his father, just as Kirei orders an arrow shower. Shuuyu calls for a retreat, much to the dismay of Sonsaku, and the Son Army retreated into a nearby bamboo forest. Kirei soon gives chase into the forest, only to be soon overwhelmed by the smoke of burning bamboo, a stratagem of Shuuyu to disadvantage Kirei's overwhelming numbers, which Rikuson and Sonshoukou are in charge of. Blinded and choking on the smoke, Kirei leads his troops back to their warships, only to see that Sonsaku and the Son Army have already commandeered all of them. Thinking of retreating back into the bamboo forest, Kirei is stopped by Taishiji, who has brought along warriors that resemble the Koutou Marines. Kirei manages to escape, and Taishiji finally accepts Sonsaku's invite. Rikuson is so impressed by Shuuyu's stratagem that he wants to become Shuuyu's student, to which Shuuyu hesitates, but finally agrees.
19	"Emperor Declared"; Transliteration: "Koutei Sengen" (Japanese: 皇帝宣言)	August 7, 2010
The episode begins back in Jushun, with Enjyutsu enjoying some honey, though Kirei's defeat at Koutou left a bitter after-taste. Kirei pledges mercy with information about Ryuubi, and how he's plowing the land with the villagers in Joshuu. Enjyutsu thinks that Joshuu is easy pickings, and decides to personally head his army to invade. The Gyokuji glows with a dark aura again, as Enjyutsu instructs Ryofu to join. Through a flashback, it is revealed that after the destruction of the Biujiyou, Enjyutsu saw a light streaking across the sky. He found the source to be Gyokuji, and grabs it, only to be grabbed by Ryofu. Enjyutsu is stunned, but Ryofu gives the Gyokuji to him, in exchange for more battles. Over at Joshuu, Ryuubi, Kan-u and Chouhi are tilling the land with the fellow villagers, though Chouhi seems to be complaining about how he's going to get rusty at battles. They all decided to take a break, but Chouhi wanted to finish up first. The other two left with the villagers, and Chouhi finishes his proud plot of land, only to be ruined by Kirei jumping in. Chouhi is shocked to see Enjyutsu and his army, and easily repels off Kirei. Just as he is on his way to take Enjyutsu's head, Ryofu steps in. Shocked to see Ryofu alive, Chouhi hesitates. Ryofu claims to be a God from Hell, and unleashed his new finishing technique. The episode ends with Chouhi looking on in fear.
20	"Joshuu Falls"; Transliteration: "Joshuu Kanraku" (Japanese: 徐州陷落)	August 14, 2010
The episode carries on from the previous episode, with Chouhi facing off against Ryofu's fearsome attack. Chouhi only barely manages to block it, and is blown away by the attack's sheer power. Ryofu walks off, and Enjyutsu instructs his army to advance and invade Joshuu, with Chouhi struggling to get up. Over at Joshuu, Ryuubi and Kan-u are preparing some food for the late Chouhi, only to be attacked by a shower of burning arrows. Ryuubi is enraged at the peace being broken, and swears to defeat the invaders. Ryuubi and Kan-u managed to retreat most of the villagers to the main Governor's house, just as Enjyutsu's troops break in. The two are enraged at Enjyutsu's actions, and manages to repel the troops off. However, Ryuubi spots smoke from a neighbouring village, and the villagers fear the worst. Just then, Chouhi breaks through, calling them to retreat out of Joshuu. Ryuubi argues that they should be defending the village, but Chouhi retorts saying that the sheer number of troops have the advantage. With reluctance, Ryuubi and Kan-u lead the villagers out of Joshuu, and mention that they can take refugee over at Yuushu. However, the villagers are tired from the running, and Enjyutsu catches up with them. The sworn brothers prepare for their last stand, just as Sousou arrives to intercept Enjyutsu. Enjyutsu pulls out the Gyokuji and tries to summon the Tengyokuyai, but fails. He then retreats, having won Joshuu. Sousou reprimands Ryuubi's naiveness of peace, and that Ryuubi is the one responsible for the fall of Joshuu, as well as the loss of the villagers' peace and happiness. Ryuubi falls to his knees, and the episode ends with Sousou asking Ryuubi to join him.
21	"Decision of Ryuubi"; Transliteration: "Ryuubi no Sentaku" (Japanese: 劉備の選択)	August 21, 2010
At a temporal resting place, Ryuubi is tending to the Joshuu refugees, when Sousou approaches him about his proposal. In the previous episode, Sousou wanted Ryuubi to serve him to help unify Mirisha. Sousou proceeds to say that the refugees can stay in Kyoshou, and even let Chouhi and Kan-u become his generals, but with one condition: That Ryuubi forsakes his love for the people. Sousou believes that sympathy is not needed to unify Mirish, only through force can peace be totally achieved. Ryuubi strongly disagrees, but hestitates to reply. Soon after, all of them arrived at Kyoshou. The refugees comment on how there's a large marketplace, and patrols on the city walls. Upon hearing this, Ryuubi feels that Sousou may be right after all. Just then, a kid Bachou Blue Destiny appears, recognising Ryuubi. It is revealed that Bachou was in Chouhi's village back in episode two, and is currently travelling around Mirisha. He knows of Ryuubi being the Governor of Joshuu, but Ryuubi corrects him saying that he is the one responsible for Joshuu's fall to Enjyutsu. Kan-u and Chouhi disagrees, but Ryuubi decides to adhere to Sousou's condition. At the Kyoshou Castle, Ryuubi meets Ten-i Asshimar, who serves Sousou with adoration. Ten-i praises Ryuubi for his talents, and lets him into Sousou's chamber (It is of note that Teiiku Wise Wallaby is in the chamber as well). Just as Ryuubi is going to say his decision, Kan-u, Chouhi, Bachou and the refugees barge in, saying that they love Ryuubi as he is, and forsaking that love is not within his character. Touched, Ryuubi declines Sousou's offer. Shiba-i suggests to dispose of them, but Sousou has other plans.
22	"Castle of Betrayal"; Transliteration: "Uragiri no Shiro" (Japanese: 裏切りの城)	August 28, 2010
The episode begins with Ten-i explaining to the sworn brothers about Choushuu Britova, the Governor of En (宛). Choushuu joined Sousou's army out of admiration, and shares the same goal with Sousou, that is to unify Mirisha through force. Choushuu has invited Sousou to En for the completion of the En Castle, and Sousou invited the sworn brothers, to let them understand that there are other warlords that share his vision. As they depart, Ten-i continues to praise highly of Sousou, how Sousou let a lowly bandit like himself serve him, and that it's his will to carry out Sousou's vision. They all arrive at En, and are welcomed by Choushuu, and his strategist, Kaku Ashtaron. Sousou, Ryuubi and Ten-i proceed to the main chamber, while Kan-u and Chouhi are led to another room for refreshments. At the main chamber, Choushuu says how he has always admired Sousou and his vision, however, someone else has his complete admiration now: Enjyutsu. Choushuu and Kaku jumped away, and Kaku springs a cage trap on Sousou, Ryuubi and Ten-i. The three can't escape as their weapons are given to the servants for safe-keeping earlier. Kirei springs out from a turnabout wall, and gloats at Sousou falling for their trap. Kaku then releases a falling ceiling, to which Ten-i uses his strength to hold the ceiling up. Kaku releases some rocks to increase the burden. In the other room, Kan-u hears some noise and finds something amiss, and rushes out. Chouhi joins in, and barges into the main chamber. Kan-u frees Ryuubi and Sousou, just before Ten-i gets crushed. Seeing the trap fail, Kirei, Choushuu and Kaku escape. In his final words, Ten-i asks if Sousou is unharmed, and upon seeing so, dies. Sousou wants to return to Kyoshou to lead his army and chase after Choushuu, to which Ryuubi asks if he does not feel sympathy for Ten-i's sacrifice. Sousou does not, and Ryuubi swears to never serve Sousou. Back at Kyoshou, the sworn brothers decide to continue their journey around Mirisha, and Sousou labels them as enemies.
23	"Heaven and Earth"; Transliteration: "Ten to Chi" (Japanese: 天と地)	September 4, 2010
The three sworn brothers have arrived at Gyou (鄴), the capital of Kishuu (冀州). Ryuubi wants to meet Enshou, and inform him of Enjyutsu's recent deeds. They admire at how grand Gyou is, until they are halted by Ganryou Gazu-L and Bunshuu Gazu-R, guardians of Gyou. Ganryou and Bunshuu labels the three sworn brothers as suspicious characters, causing Kan-u and Chouhi to want to duel. Enshou arrives to stop them. Over at the Gyou Castle, Ryuubi informs Enshou of Enjyutsu's invasion of Joshuu, as well as all his evil deeds after proclaiming himself as Emperor, and begs Enshou to stop him. However, Enshou has severed all ties with his brother, stating that Enjyutsu is none of his concerns, and that what he's doing is natural in times of war. The three sworn brothers leave, as Denpou Galus J and Soju R-Jarja informs Enshou of Sousou's and Sonsaku's plans to attack Enjyutsu. Enshou gloats that after Sousou and Sonsaku are done with Enjyutsu, the Gyokuji will be his for the taking. Outside Gyou, the 3 sworn brothers ponder about their next move, when Ryuubi bumps into Koumei. After some words of wisdom about losing the will to fish, Ryuubi realises that he has not lost his will to bring peace for the people. With renewed resolve, the 3 sworn brothers rush to Jushun to defeat Enjyutsu once and for all. Sousou and Sonsaku also rallies up their armies to attack Enjyutsu in Jushun.
24	"Challenge of the Little Conqueror"; Transliteration: "Shou Haou no Chousen" (Japanese: 小覇王の挑戦)	September 11, 2010
The episode recaps on how the 3 sworn brothers, Sousou, and Sonsaku intend to end Enjyutsu's tyranny, and attack Jushun. Sonsaku and his army are the first to arrive. Shuuyu has planned a stratagem: To attack the Jushun Castle front gate with the main force, but to breach in from the rear gate. Sonsaku volunteers for the rear attack. Sonken is in awe of Sonsaku's courage, but Sonsaku consoles Sonken, saying that he draws courage from compassion and love for the people. The attack begins, with Shuuyu leading the main force, and Choushuu is alarmed. However, Kaku calms him down, saying he has seen through the attack, and has prepared a counter-stratagem. Rikuson is pleased that the stratagem is working, but Shuuyu feels that something is amiss. When lights are shone on the castle walls, it is revealed that straw dolls were firing at them, and Shuuyu fears for Sonsaku's safety. Over at the rear gate, Sonsaku is within reach of the rear gate, when he is attacked by archers under Kirei. Sonsaku easily deflects the arrows, and lures Kirei into fighting him one-on-one. Sonsaku easily overpowers Kirei, and as he struggles to counterattack, Sonsaku picks up Kirei's weapon, and stabs him, finally killing Kirei, and avenging Sonken Zephyranthes. Shuuyu arrives in time to cover Sonsaku's back, commenting on how he knew Sonsaku is going to defeat Kirei alone for the very beginning. The episode ends with Sonsaku pointing the Kouteitou at Enjyutsu, and declaring to take his head.
25	"Farewell! Sonsaku"; Transliteration: "Saraba! Sonsaku" (Japanese: さらば！孫策)	September 18, 2010
The episode starts with a recap of the previous episode. Enjyutsu is in a panic at Kirei's death, and orders Ryofu to dispose of Sonsaku and his army. As the rear gate is breached, Kaku informs Choushuu that it's time to jump ship. Shocked at Kaku's betrayal, Kaku mentions that Enjyutsu will soon taste defeat, and the two of them have much to accomplish. The two thus escape into the night. As Sonsaku leads his army inward, they get intercepted by Ryofu's finishing technique, to which all but Sonsaku are badly injured. Sonsaku and Ryofu then duel it out. It's morning, as Sousou receives word that Sonsaku's ais are already at Jushun. Shiba-i comments that Sonsaku is incapable of defeating Ryofu, to which Sousou agrees, and hastens his advance. The 3 sworn brothers are also rushing over, hoping to get there in time. The duel rages on, but Ryofu has the upper hand, after making Sonsaku lose his grip on the Koteitou. Sonsaku carries on fighting, much to Ryofu's surprise. As Sonken rushes to bring the Koteitou to Sonsaku, Sonsaku is struck down with a fatal blow defending Sonken. Sonsaku then prepares for an ultimate attack, passed down from Sonken Zephyranthes, and manages to destroy half of Ryofu's mask, but couldn't follow through, as Ryofu stabs right though him. Sonken rushes in to challenge Ryofu, to which Ryofu turned, and walked away, saying he has won. As Sonken grieves, Sonsaku says that Sonken will be the one to heal the people of Mirisha with his compassion, and dies in Sonken's hands. The episode ends with a very determined Sonken, eyes aglow.
26	"Courage of Truth"; Transliteration: "Makoto no Yuuki" (Japanese: 真（まこと）の勇気)	September 25, 2010
Sousou and the three sworn brothers have arrived in Jushun, but were too late to help Sonsaku. Enjyutsu gloats, and sends his army to intercept them all. The two factions easily defeats Enjyutsu's army, and storms the castle. In his throne room, Enjyutsu gloats that with Ryofu, they will not reach him easily. His monologue is cut short with Sousou, Kakouton, Kakouen and the three sworn brothers barged in. It seems Ryofu and his team have abandoned him, and Enjyutsu is in a total panic. He tries to summon the Tengyokugai, but fails miserably. As the allied forces rush in to finish Enjyutsu off, the Gyokuji glowed with darkness, and formed a forcefield around Enjyutsu. Enjyutsu gloats, and summons the dark power, which destroys the castle, flinging out the heroes. As the dust settles, Enjyutsu dons a new armor, the Hishou Keitai (飛翔形態), granted from the darkness within the Gyokuji. He flies over the battlefield, and gloats at his new power as he indiscriminately attacks. Sonshoukou retaliates, but is easily overpowered. Sonken rushes in to check on her, as Enjyutsu tries a sneak attack. As Enjyutsu continues to gloat of his invincibility, and badmouths Sonken Zephyranthes and Sonsaku, Sonken swears to never forgive Enjyutsu and his tyranny, to which the Gyokuji responds with a golden light. With his courage, Sonken has summoned the Tengyokugai in Douko (弩虎) form, and easily overpowers Enjyustu, and destroys whatever was left of Jushun. As the Gyokuji and the Tengyokugai fly off to parts unknown, Sonken is shocked at the destruction he has caused. It's nightfall at Kishuu, Enshou is enjoying some wine when his guard informs him that Enjyustu is currently at the castle gate, requesting an audience with him. Enshou replies that he knows no such person, and orders to turn him away. Enshou comments that he has no need for a fool who doesn't have the Gyokuji. As the castle gates close, Enjyutsu begs to see his brother. Being turned down, Enjyutsu walks away in the rain, all tattered, limping and coughing. He trips over a puddle and smashes his favourite honey jar. On his final breath, Enjyutsu wishes he could taste his favourite honey again, and dies soon after.
27	"Ahoy, Ye Chaotic Corsairs!"; Transliteration: "Abarenbou Kenzan!" (Japanese: 暴れん坊見参！)	October 2, 2010
Koutou is currently in peace, with the Son family back. Rikuson and Sonshoukou are gathering some fruits for the villagers, as Rikuson enjoys the peace thanks to Sonsaku's efforts, to which Sonshoukou grew teary-eyed. The peace was interrupted when Ryomou Dijeh and Kannei Kampfer, on their jet-skis, terrorised the villages by splashing water on the villages, an capsizing a boat with a village in it. Sonshoukou swears to defeat them. Over at the castle, Sonken, Shuuyu, Taishiji and Kougai are discussing on the suppression of Ryomou and Kannei. Due to their high maneuverability in the water, the pirates led by Ryomou and Kannei are hard to suppress. Sonken half-hearted agrees on Shuuyu's plan, and walks away, worrying Kougai. Outside, Sonken recalls Sonsaku's last words, and is depressed in being unable to fulfill them. Sonshoukou had dragged Rikuson along to search for the pirate's base, without anyone knowing. Upon reaching an empty campsite believed to be the base, the two were ambushed by Ryomou, Kannei and the would-be Koutou Marines. Back at Koutou, Kougai comes across Sonshoukou's letter of her departure, and alerts Shuuyu and Taishiji. Sonken soon arrives, and becomes aware of Sonshoukou's rashness. When Shuuyu suggests Taishiji to rally up his strongest warriors, Sonken interjects, and wants to go alone to save Sonshoukou.
28	"Blue-eyed Children of Koutou"; Transliteration: "Koutou no Hekigan Ji" (Japanese: 江東の碧眼兒)	October 9, 2010
The episode begins with a recap of what happened in the previous episode. As Sonken leaves for the pirate base, Kougai rushes out with the Koteitou, commenting that whenever a Lord of Koutou leaves for battle, he must bring along the Koteitou. As Sonken leaves, Taishiji questions if they should provide backup, to which Shuuyu declines, saying this is a fight that Sonken must overcme himself. At the pirate's base, the pirates are enjoying themselves, while Sonshoukou and Rikuson struggle to get free. As the pirates laughed at their fruitless attempts, Sonken arrives and saves Sonshoukou. Sonken duels Ryomou, while Sonshoukou frees Rikuson. Though Sonken manages to deflect Ryomou's attacks, Ryomou laughs at Sonken's unpolished skills. When Kannei interjects with his finishing technique, Sonken deflects it easier, shocking both Ryomou and Kannei. Sonshoukou questions why they keep harassing the people of Koutou, to which she got a shocking answer: The pirates wanted to serve under Sonsaku, who has a strong tiger spirit of a hero. Upon hearing this, Sonken lowers the Koteitou, saying he will welcome them as family. Ryomou feels insulted and scratches Sonken's armour, to which Sonken stresses that a Lord of Koutou does not harm his family. A tiger aura appears around Sonken, which finally tames the pirates. Back at Koutou, with the pirates recruited into the Son Army, Sonken contemplates about his courage, and looks ahead to the future.
29	"Feedback of Ryuubi"; Transliteration: "Ryuubi no Kikan" (Japanese: 劉備の帰還)	October 16, 2010
The episode begins... With Ryuubi, Kan-u and Chouhi getting lost in a forest, as Koumei's Bakuoki flies overhead. As they succumb to hunger, the 3 sworn brothers recall a similar event with Joshuu, and recap episode 15. Just as they recover slightly from hunger, a wild boar attacks, and as they flee, they recap episode 18 to episode 25. After they manage to elude the wild boar, they recap episode 26. When they hear some rustling from the bushes, Kan-u and Chouhi fear it's the wild boar and prepare to attack, when Ryuubi notices it's the villagers of Joshuu. They are making their way back to Joshuu, after it is left ungoverned since Enjyutsu's defeat. And coincidentally, Joshuu lies beyond the forest. The villagers wish for Ryuubi to become the Governor of Joshuu again, and help rebuild the peace it once had. Ryuubi, filled with gratitude, accepts the offer again. Just then, the wild boar returns, and headbutts Chouhi, as Koumei looks on, commenting what strange people the 3 sworn brothers are.
30	"Reunion, Yuushu"; Transliteration: "Saikai, Yuushu" (Japanese: 再会、幽州)	October 23, 2010
The episode begins with Chou-un leading his White Stallion battalion into battle against the Ugan at Yuushu's border. Chou-un easily overpowers them with the Hakuba Jin, and the Ugan retreats. Just then, Chouhi blasts through the nearby bushes, along with Ryuubi and Kan-u. Kousonsan warmly welcomes the 3 sworn brothers. At the Yuushu castle, Ryuubi informs Kousonsan of his re-appointment as Joshuu's Governor. Outside, Chou-un and Chouhi have a duel, with Kan-u as judge. Ryuubi then recaps episode 1 to episode 3. Kan-u declares a draw, with Chou-un wanting to see the Trinity. Chouhi then recaps episode 8. Kan-u then challenges Chou-un to a duel, to which Chou-un accepts. While dueling, Kan-u recaps episode 13. Back at the castle, Kousonsan contemplates how the Ugan seems to be stronger with each attack, even after Touton's defeat, and fears that someone is supporting the Ugan. A scout then arrives with bad news: Enshou has led his army to the outskirts of Yuushu, with an army of one million in strength. The episode ends with Enshou gloating that Yuushu's peasant army is no match for his.
31	"Fierce Fighting Hakuba Jin"; Transliteration: "Gekitou Hakuba Jin" (Japanese: 激闘白馬陣)	October 30, 2010
The episode begins with a recap of Enshou's forces planning to invade Yuushu. At Enchou's camp, he gloats that he will be the one to unify Mirisha, by first invading the weakened Yuushu forces. In the background, the Gyouji glows with an ominous aura inside Enjyustu's Hishou Keitai armour. However, Enshou fears the Hakuba Jin, to which Soju and Denpou have a plan to counter it. Outside, Choukou Zaku III is training his platoon for the coming battle, and Denpou orders Choukou to lead his platoon into the frontlines, to which Choukou proudly accepts. Somewhere else, the 3 sworn brothers are leading the Yuushu villagers to Ekikyourou (易京楼), a fortress within mountains. Kousonsan believes the villagers will be well-protected against Enshou's army. Chou-un and his White Stallion platoon is seen outside, ready to launch a frontal attack on Enshou's army on Kousonsan's orders. The 3 sworn brothers stay behind to better defend Ekikyourou as Kousonsan leaves. Choukou soon sees Chou-un and his White Stallion platoon, and has his platoon put up full body shields to block the coming Hakuba Jin. With the Hakuba Jin stalled, Kousonsan tells Chou-un to take down Choukou. As the two generals duel it out, Denpou and Soju release an arrow shower upon the battlefield from the flanks, resulting in heavy casualties on both sides. Kousonsan orders a retreat, seeing the Hakuba Jin defeated. As the dust settles, Choukou is shocked at a dying soldier's words. Back at Enchou's camp, Choukou is infuriated at Denpou's plan. Enshou interrupts, saying the Hakuba Jin is defeated, and they were victorious. He adds that any insubordination will result in execution. Back at Ekikyourou, Kousonsan was grieving at the loss of his troops, and mentions that the Hakuba Jin was written by Fukuryuu (伏竜), a genius strategist. Ryuubi offers to find Fukuryuu to help repel Enshou, while Kan-u offers to go to Kyoshou to ask for Sousou's assistance. The episode ends with the 3 sworn brothers leaving, and Kousonsan looking on, awaiting their return.
32	"Kan-u Roars!"; Transliteration: "Kan-u Houkou!" (Japanese: 関羽咆哮！)	November 6, 2010
The episode begins with a recap of Ryuubi and Chouhi heading to Keishuu (荊州), while Kan-u heads to Kyoshou. At the border of Keishuu, Ryuubi and Chouhi encounters Koumei, and asks him if he knew where Fukuryuu is. A bit shocked at the request, Koumei points at that Suikyou Guntank might know, and gives the two directions to Suikyou's residence. The two soon arrive, and is invited in by Suikyou. Upon asking why the two need his help, Ryuubi relates how Enshou's troops is threatening the peace and wants to stop him before innocent lives are lost, and thus require Fukuryuu's assistance. However, Suikyou says that Fukuryuu once used his stratagems to fight against Toutaku, but he lost many of his men, and has thus "died" from grief. Depressed, Ryuubi and Chouhi leaves. As Suikyou watch the two leave, Koumei steps out from hiding, and Suikyou asks if this was for the best. Koumei says it has nothing to do with him, to which Suikyou questions that comment. At Kyoshou, Kan-u comments on how Kyoshou has grown in size, with improved border defenses and larger population. He gets an audience with Sousou and his generals, to which Sousou already knows of Kan-u's purpose here: To enlist his help against Enshou. Kakouton and Kakouen strongly objects, saying Kyoshou might be attacked at any time as well, to which Kan-u mentions that Kousonsan will repay the help with all he can. Shiba-i mentions Yuushu has no monetary gain, but Sousou retorts, saying all he needs is to amass more warriors to his cause. Kan-u thus pledges his strength to Sousou, to which Kakuka wants a demonstration. He brings out a mountain bandit, Shuusou Dovenwolf, and says if he can defeat Kan-u, he is pardoned. Shuusou accepts, but can't land a single blow on Kan-u, who gracefully dodges every hit. Kan-u's overwhelming spirit allows him to easily overpower Shuusou with only one finger, impressing everyone. The episode ends with Sousou sending all his troops to Yuushu, though Kakuka is still suspicious of Kan-u.
33	"Kishuu's Million Troops"; Transliteration: "Kishuu Hyakuman Gun" (Japanese: 冀州百万軍)	November 13, 2010
Ryuubi and Chouhi are still in Keishuu, hoping to find more clues to find Fukuryuu, as Ryuubi cannot believe that Fukuryuu has died. Suikyou appears, and asks why the two are not making their way back to Yuushu. After Ryuubi explains, Suikyou cautions them that the strength of Enshou is not from his million troops, but of his two strategists, Denpou and Soja. Fearing Kousonsan's safety, Ryuubi and Chouhi rushes back to Yuushu. Koumei steps out from hiding again, to which Suikyou jokes that Koumei should just go back with them. However, Koumei reiterates that Fukuryuu is no more. Back at Ekikyourou, Kousonsan, Chou-un and the Yuushu archers managed to repel each wave of Enshou troops. At the Enshou camp, Enshou is infuriated at not making any headway into Ekikyourou. Soju replies that he has the perfect plan. Soju relays up the remaining Ugan troops, and threatens to kill them for their incompetence. However, if they can stack up sandbags at Ekikyourou's wall, they are spared. Denpou comments on how sly Soju is, and that after the plan is a success, Ryofu's Team will clean up the mess. The Ugan begin their attack, to which Chou-un finally understand that it was Enshou all along backing the Ugan. The Yuushu archers manage to repel most of the Ugan, but some managed to stack up the sandbags. Chou-un then destroys the sandbags, revealing gunpowder. Soju "thanks" the Ugan, and fires a fire arrow, igniting the sandbags, resulting in a huge explosion. Ekikyourou's wall has been breached, with heavy casualties on both sides. As Kousonsan curses at Enshou's despicable plan, Ryofu's Team steps in, commenting they are the Shura that feeds on the souls of the dead. Survivung Yuushu troops are no match against Ryofu's Team, and Ryofu deals the finishing blow on Kousonsan. As Chou-un recovers from the explosion earlier, he sees Kousonsan, defeated.
34	"Sunset, Ekikyourou"; Transliteration: "Tasogare, Ekikyourou" (Japanese: 黄昏、易京楼)	November 20, 2010
Kousonsan slowly regains consciousness after being defeated by Ryofu. Chou-un is relieved to see him awake. Kousonsan is more worried about the villagers and any movement from Enshou's troops, to which Chou-un motions him to take a look outside. Enshou's troops have completed occupied the area just outside the breached Ekikyourou wall, awaiting Enshou's orders. Ryofu's Team withdraws, but Chouryou requests to stay to give Kousonsan an honourable death. Enshou receives word that Sousou and his army are closing in on his position, and wants to deal with Kousonsan as quickly as possible, to which Denpou has a plan when Chouryou steps up. At Ekikyourou, Kousonsan decides to surrender for the sake of the villagers, and hands over Fukuryuu's scroll to Chou-un, saying that the scroll can never fall into Enshou's hands. He also gives Chou-un another spear, to which Chou-un combines to form the Muzougeki Arashi (武双戟・嵐). Kousonsan then orders Chou-un to find Ryuubi. With tears, Chou-un rushes off. Kousonsan receives word that Chouryou is requesting his presence. Kousonsan and Chouryou meet, each agreeing that surrendering is the best option, with Chouryou respecting Kousonsan's love for his villagers. They both meet up with Enshou, who accepts Kousonsan's surrender, but orders an arrow shower upon Ekikyourou. Shocked at Enshou's actions, Kousonsan blames Chouryou, to which Chouryou denies, as Enshou deceived him as well. As Kousonsan prepares to attack Chouryou, he is impaled with several arrows, and dies, falling onto his knees. Enshou then orders a fire arrow shower, to burn down Ekikyourou. It's nightfall when Ryuubi and Chouhi meet up with Chou-un. Ryuubi fears Kousonsan's safety, and Chouhi notices a red hue in the sky. The 3 arrive at a cliff overlooking Ekikyourou, to see it in flames. Ryuubi notices Kousonsan, kneeling in front of Ekikyourou, just as explosions rip through the fortress. Kousonsan's corpse perishes in the explosions as Ryuubi painfully cries out to him.
35	"All Troops to Kanto"; Transliteration: "Zengun Kanto he" (Japanese: 全軍官渡へ)	November 27, 2010
At Enshou's camp, he gloats at his latest victory, and sets his eyes on defeating the coming Sousou at Kanto (官渡). At the burnt remains of Ekikyourou, Ryuubi is frustrated at his failure of being unable to help Kousonsan, and vows revenge against Enshou. Chou-un reminds Ryuubi of the million troops Enshou has, to which Ryuubi stands firm in his decision. Chouhi wholeheartedly supports Ryuubi, and Chou-un, moved by the 2, swears to become Ryuubi's steed. Ryuubi declines, saying that Chou-un has always been their companion since the beginning. The 3 sets out south towards Kanto. Over at Sousou, he receives word that Ekikyourou has fallen, and that Kousonsan fought bravely to the end. Kan-u curses in disbelief, as Kakuka sarcastically says this mobilisation is all for nothing. Teiiku Wise Wallaby disagrees, saying this is a perfect chance to strike Enshou. Their decision is interrupted by Chouryou riding towards their location. Chouryou wants to join Sousou's army to defeat Enshou. He relates the events that happened at Ekikyourou. Everyone is shocked at Enshou's treachery, and that's the reason Chouryou wants to join Sousou. Kakouton and Kakouen strongly objects. Kakuka is suspicious of Chouryou, fearing of possible backstabbing in the future. Kan-u believes in Chouryou, saying his eyes show no sign of hesitation. After listening to Chouryou quote Enshou on how he will be the one to unify Mirisha, Sousou trusts Chouryou and allows him to join his army. With a new general, Sousou sets his eyes on Kanto, the battlefield where he and Enshou will meet.
36	"Battle of Kanto"; Transliteration: "Kanto no Tatakai" (Japanese: 官渡の戦い)	December 4, 2010
The episode begins with a slight recap of Enshou having conquered the whole northern region of Mirisha after Kousonsan's defeat at Ekikyourou, and begins his conquest southwards. At this point Sousou intercepts him, and the battle at Kanto begins. Soju is in charge of Enshou's frontline defense, with his skills in traps and the help of Ganryou and Bunshuu, none of Sousou's frontline troops has managed to break through. At Sousou's camp, Kakuka suggests sending in a kamikaze group to trigger all the traps, but Teiiku strongly objects to the plan. Kakuka then suggests Kan-u to do it, to which Kan-u accepts. Kan-u manages to repel most of the traps, but is caught when he nearly falls into a spike pit, with an arrow shower aimed at him. Chouryou arrives to save Kan-u, commenting that Kan-u's lack of hesitation at taking up this mission is respectable, and that they are true comrade-in-arms. The only obstacle left is the pair of Ganryou and Bunshuu, to which Kan-u and Chouryou easily kills both with their combined finishing move. Soju, shocked at this change of events, flees, only to be stopped by Kan-u and Chouryou. But it was all another trap, as a huge boulder lands on top of the two. Soju gloats, but is short-lived when the two break out. With a swift slash from the 2, Soju is killed. With Enshou's frontline defense breached, Sousou prepares to attack Enshou directly, unaware that Denpou still has the Ryofu Team under him.
37	"Farewell"; Transliteration: "Ketsubetsu" (Japanese: 決別)	December 11, 2010
The episode begins with a recap of how Chouryou was disgusted at Enshou's tactics at Ekikyourou, and joined Sousou's cause. Kan-u, Chouryou, Kakouton and Kakouen easily overpowers Enshou's troops, and the remaining Sousou's troops have managed to force Enshou's troops to retreat, however, when Ryofu's Team enters the battlefield, the tables are turned to Enshou's favour. Ryofu rushes towards Sousou, as the rest of his team cover for him, repelling any troops. As Ryofu is about to reach Sousou, Chouryou intercepts him. Surprised, Ryofu questions Chouryou's motives. Chouryou can no longer stand Enshou stepping on his pride, and thus joined Sousou to defeat Enshou, even if he has to fight Ryofu. Amused, Ryofu duels Chouryou, but it is clear that Chouryou is no match to Ryofu. Before Ryofu can strike down on Chouryou, Kan-u intercepts, commenting that true comrade-in-arms cover each other. Amused again, Ryofu duels Kan-u. The battle rages on between Sousou's and Enshou's troops, with casualties on both sides. Ryuubi, Chouhi and Chou-un finally arrive on the scene, and joins in the battle.
38	"Champion Chosen by the Heavens"; Transliteration: "Ten ni Eraba Reshi Hasha" (Japanese: 天に選ばれし覇者)	December 18, 2010
Enshou is infuriated that Ryofu has yet to defeat Sousou, and Denpou is trying his best to calm him down. However, even worse news comes in, as Enshou's rear camp is being attacked by Ryuubi, Chouhi and Chou-un. Denpou has not expected the three to arrive so quickly, and Enshou goes into a panic. He then remembers the Gyokuji, and comments that this is the time to use it and with it, he will be granted unlimited power needed to defeat all that oppose him. Denpou objects to the idea, fearing that Enshou will be possessed by the Gyokuji, and suffer the same fate as Enjyutsu. Enshou retorts that he's not as weak as his brother, and that the only way is to test it. He proclaims himself Emperor, and touches the Gyokuji, resulting in a huge explosion of dark energy that kills Denpou in the blast. Ryuubi, Chouhi and Chou-un are nearing Enshou's main camp, when they witness a huge pillar of dark energy rising into the sky. Within the dark energy pillar, Enshou combines with Enjyutsu's Hishou Keitai armour, and transforms into a four-armed behemoth, the Ryuuhi Keitai (龍飛形態). With amazing speed, he flies towards Sousou. Ryuubi, Chouhi and Chou-un arrive at what is left of Enshou's main camp, and sees Denpou's corpse. The three are left in disbelief at the scene. Enshou soon arrives with a huge bang, and challenges Sousou. Sousou accepts, but Kakuka comments that Sousou will not be able to stand up against Enshou with the Gyokuji. However, Shiba-i reiterates that Sousou is a descendant of the Three Sovereigns. The duel begins, but Enshou easily overpowers Sousou, while Sousou curses at himself for the sudden lack of strength. Enshou then unleashes his finishing move, hoping to burn Sousou to ashes. However, Sousou survives, and his strong sense to acquire new strength for justice causes the Gyokuji to glow, thus summoning forth the Tengyokugai in Enhou (炎鳳) form. Enshou is shocked at the development, as Sousou declares that Enshou will be the downfall of Mirisha, and that he will be the one to bring justice back. Sousou easily overpowers Enshou, and in the resulting explosion, Enshou declares that if he can't rule Mirisha, he will rule over Hell instead and perishes. Sousou is impressed at the Tengyokugai's power as his troops celebrate his victory. Ryofu is still dueling Chouryou and Kan-u when he notices the glow of the Tengyokugai. The episode ends with Ryofu calling out Sousou.
39	"Shura Challenges the Heavens"; Transliteration: "Ten ni Chou Nda Shura" (Japanese: 天に挑んだ修羅)	December 25, 2010
The episode recaps Sousou's victory over Enshou. Ryofu, seeing the glow of the Tengyokugai, stops his duel with Kan-u and Chouryou, and calls forth Sekitoba, rushing off towards Sousou. Kan-u wants to give chase, but Chouryou is too tired from dueling. Ryuubi, Chou-un and Chouhi continues their advance towards Sousou's main camp. Back at the main camp, Sousou is still donning the Tengyokugai, as his troops celebrate his victory. Shiba-i is very pleased that the Tengyokugai has descended upon Sousou, cementing Sousou as a descendant of the Three Sovereigns. Ryofu intercepts Sousou in midair, and demands a duel with him. Sousou initially rejects, but after Ryofu claims that Sousou is one of the strongest, and that he only duels with the strongest, Sousou accepts. With Ryofu's spirit, the Gyokuji glows even brighter, granting Sousou even more power, and the duel begins with the two unleashing their finishing techniques, the techniques colliding to become a fire tornado, the stage for the duel. Chou-sen, Chinkyuu and Koushun cannot stand and watch the duel, and enters the fire tornado to support Ryofu. Within, even though Sousou has the upper hand, Ryofu is still giving Sousou some trouble. However, it isn't long that Ryofu succumbs to Sousou. Before Sousou can hand the finishing blow, Chinkyuu throws his spinning saws, which Sousou easily burns away. Koushun throws his club to Ryofu, as Chou-sen uses her butterflies illusion. Sousou burns away the illusion, but gets clubbed by Ryofu. Ryofu stands up again, as Sousou curses at Ryofu being able to land a hit on the Tengyokugai. Incensed, Sousou calls forth the Enhou spirit within the Tengyokugai, shocking Ryofu. The Enhou spirit devours Chinkyuu and Koushun, with the two saying farewell and promising to meet Ryofu in the afterlife. As the spirit approaches Ryofu, Chou-sen steps in, and Sousou deals a finishing slash on Chou-sen and Ryofu. As Chou-sen dies in Ryofu's arms, Ryofu comments on how he has finally realises his own spirit, and the two are devoured by the Enhou spirit. The Tengyokugai returns to the heavens, and the Gyokuji flies off into the distance. Jyokou wants to give chase to the Gyokuji, but Sousou stops him, saying the Gyokuji will return one day. Sekitoba appears before Chouryou, and he knows that Sekitoba is the only one to survive. The episode ends with a shot of the battlefield, with Ryofu's halberd stuck in the ground as a Chou-sen butterfly flies towards it.
40	"Bonds Beyond a Thousand Miles"; Transliteration: "Senri wo Koe ta Kizuna" (Japanese: 千里を越えた絆)	December 25, 2010
With the defeat of Enshou at the battle of Kanto, Sousou has unified the whole northern region of Mirisha under his rule. At Kyoshou, Shiba-i presents the Shichiseiken (the same sword in ep 4) to Sousou, saying that the sword is a symbol of an emperor. At Kanto, Ryuubi wants to resume his search for the Fukuryuu at Keishuu, much to Chouhi's initial dissatisfaction. Chouryou confronts Kakuka after hearing Kan-u is held prisoner in the dungeon. Kakuka explains that he plans to execute Kan-u, since Kan-u is no longer faithful to Sousou's ambition. In the dungeon, Kan-u reunites with Shuusou in the opposite cell. With encouragement from Shuusou, Kan-u remembers his oath of brotherhood, and breaks out with Shuusou. Shuusou decides to distract the guards to let Kan-u escape, and hopes to meet again in the future. Kan-u almost escapes when Chouryou, on Sekitoba, blocks his exit. Chouryou tries to persuade Kan-u to stay, but to no avail. A duel ensues, but Kan-u's determination leads him to victory. Chouryou give Sekitoba to Kan-u and tells him that Ryuubi is making his way to Keishuu. Kan-u bids farewell to Chouryou, knowing that the next time they meet, they'll be enemies. Sousou and Kakuka watch the duel from a tower, with Kakuka being displeased at the result. However, Sousou comments that all he needs to do, is to defeat all that stands in his way. At Keishuu, Ryuubi begs Suikyou for more information about Fukuryuu. Kan-u steps in, and a touching reunion unfolds.
41	"Fukuryuu, Soaring to the Heavens"; Transliteration: "Fukuryuu, Ten wo Kakeru" (Japanese: 伏竜、天を翔ける)	January 8, 2011
The episode begins with Ryuubi, Kan-u, Chouhi and Chou-un paying a visit to the Governor of Keishuu, Ryuuhyou Gundam. The four requests information about the passed Fukuryuu, to which Ryuuhyou is shocked to hear of his passing. Much to everyone's surprise, Ryuuhyou mentions that Suikyou knows where to find Fukuryuu. Back the Suikyou's hut, the four demand an explanation for all the lies he had said. However, before Suikyou can fully explain, a villager barges in, saying a kid, Kan-pei Gundam, has been kidnapped by Choushuu and Kaku, and they demand that Ryuubi comes alone. Ryuubi is about to rush out when Koumei steps in, saying that villager isn't one of their own, and that it's a trap. The 4 understands the situation, but insists on rushing over to save Kan-pei. In the forest, the villager reveals himself to be Kaku in disguise, and Choushuu arrives to gloat. None of the four remember the 2, much to the 2's surprise. After some reminding, Kaku forces the 4 to drop their weapons. The 4 complies, and Choushuu proceeds to tie them up. He explains that with their heads, he will regain fame and fortune from Sousou. Out of nowhere, feathers drop from the sky, and frees Kan-pei and the 4. Ryuubi summons up the Holy Trinity, and defeats Choushuu once and for all, while Kaku escapes unscathed. The 4 then notices a bird (which is in fact Koumei's Bakuoki). Koumei retrieves Bakuoki, and Ryuubi realises it was Koumei who saved them. Koumei reveals himself to be Fukuryuu, and after some encouragement from Ryuubi, decides to join him in his quest for Mirisha's future.
42	"Inheriting the Courage"; Transliteration: "Uke Tsui da Yuuki" (Japanese: 受け継いだ勇気)	January 15, 2011
The episode begins with a recap of Sousou's plan to invade Keishuu, as well as Koumei joining Ryuubi. With the coming turmoil, the peaceful days of Koutou might not last. Sonshoukou is getting a bit bored of the peace, and wants to fight some villains, much to the shock of Rikuson. Ryomou and Kannei soon appears, hoping to fight the villains Sonshoukou mentioned, but are lectured by the latter about how the river is free of villains thanks to the two. The two comment on Sonken being a reliable leader, and Sonshoukou recaps episode 6 and episode 10. She then recaps episode 18 about Sonsaku, and then episode 25. Ryomou comments that despite Koutou being peaceful now, doesn't mean it will last, and recaps episode 38. He fears that Sousou might invade Koutou in the future. At the main castle, Shuuyu informs Sonken of Sousou's intentions. Sonken hesitates, but Shuuyu advises him to think like Sonken Zephyranthes and Sonsaku before him.
43	"Stratagem of 3-Way Division"; Transliteration: "Tenka Sanpun no Kei" (Japanese: 天下三分の計)	January 22, 2011
Choukou, and his surviving platoon, attacks Sousou, in hopes of regaining Enshou's honour. Chouryou tries to stop him, stating the treachery that is Enshou, to no avail. Sousou accepts Choukou's challenge, and the duel ensues. Sousou has the upper hand for the most part, until Choukou uses his finishing technique. Before Choukou can deal the final strike, Sousou's Shichiseiken begins to glow, a glow that pushes Choukou away. Through his will, Sousou has managed to awaken the Shichiseiken into the Seihouken (星凰剣), a sword that Shiba-i comments is a weapon, and symbol, of the 3 Sovereigns. Seeing the power of Sousou's will, Choukou surrenders, and wants Sousou to take his life. Sousou strikes down at the ground, saying that he has destroyed the bonds Enshou has laid upon Choukou, and that he requires Choukou for his ambition. Seeing Sousou's being shining brightly like the sun, Choukou, and his platoon swears loyalty to Sousou. At Keishuu, Chou-un has brought over the villagers of Joshuu. Chouhi comments on tilling fields again, to which Koumei comments it's not the time. After hearing from Kan-u about Sousou's plan, Koumeu predicts that Keishuu will be attacked soon, and that the only way to truly halt the invasion, is to form an alliance with Sonken at Koutou. If the invasion fails, Mirisha will then be divided into three kingdoms, and peace will truly arrive, thus, the Stratagem of 3-Way Division. Ryuubi agrees with the plan, and hopes the alliance will be formed. The episode ends with Sousou declaring Keishuu as their first target.
44	"Ryuuteiken, Fallen One"; Transliteration: "Ryuuteiken, Otsu" (Japanese: 龍帝劍、墜つ)	January 29, 2011
At the Keishuu castle, Ryuuhyou panics after hearing that Sousou is going to attack soon. Ryuubi tries to calm him down, saying that they have sent a message to enlist the help of Sonken and his troops, and that they will stand up to Sousou. Ryuuhyou is still in a frenzied panic, when he mentions that Ryuuhyou has passed on, and flees the castle. On a cliff on the outskirts of Keishuu, Ryuubi, Kan-u, Chouhi, Chou-un and Koumei awaits Sousou's arrival. Chouhi takes a jab at Koumei, saying that both him and Ryuuhyou are alike, fleeing before the battle. Koumei then spots Sousou's and his troops, a strength of one hundred thousand. Ryuubi wants to rush into battle, but is stopped by Chouhi. However, with the villagers' lives at stake, they all agree to battle, and Koumei has a plan. Night falls, and Sousou's troops are ambushed in the forest. The frontline troops are swiftly defeated, shocking Kakouton. Shiba-i suspects Ryuubi has a strategist by his side now. Ryuubi, Kan-u, Chouhi and Chou-un then steps out to meet Sousou. Kakouton wants to duel Ryuubi, but Sousou stops him, stating that he will be the one to duel. Ryuubi's Ryuuteiken begins to resonate, much to his surprise, alongside Sousou's Seihouken. Sousou comments that the Seihouken is a symbol of the 3 Sovereigns, and that he has another symbol, and calls forth the Gyokuji. Upon seeing the light of the Gyokuji, Koumei panics, and rushes off to Ryuubi. Sousou summons the Tengyokugai in Enhou form, and challenges Ryuubi to defeat him. Ryuubi rushes in, but is easily overpowered. He then performs the Holy Trinity, and manages to strike Sousou, however before he can deal the finishing blow, Sousou blocks it, and notices that the Gyokuji resonates with Ryuubi's spirit. Sousou commends Ryuubi's spirit, but unleashes his finishing technique, and defeats Ryuubi. The Ryuuteiken reverts to its original form, as Ryuubi lies unconscious.
45	"Shocking! Chouhankyou"; Transliteration: "Gekishin! Chouhankyou" (Japanese: 激震！長坂橋)	February 5, 2011
The episode begins with a recap of Ryuubi's defeat by Sousou. Kan-u and Chouhi manage to drag the unconscious Ryuubi away, and are retreating, with Sousou's troops catching up behind them. They reach the Chouhankyou (長坂橋), and meet up with Koumei. The villagers have begun to evacuate towards Choukou, and Koumei suggest they do the same. Chou-un arrives, but has not been able to find the Ryuuteiken. He calls forth Hieisen, and returns to search for it. Chouhi decides to stand guard at the Chouhankyou. The Five Generals of Sousou soon arrive, and Chouhi takes them on, with Jyokou going first. Chouhi easily repels Jyokou, Choukou, Kakouton and Kakouen. Day breaks, and Chou-un is stay searching for the Ryuuteiken. He finally finds it stuck to a cliff. Back at the Chouhankyou, Chouryou steps up against the visibly tired Chouhi. Despite getting hit by Chouryou's finishing technique, Chouhi stands strong. Soon, there is commotion at the back of the Sousou troops. Chou-un has arrived, and quickly jumps past the Chouhankyou. Chouryou finally realises Chouhi's purpose here, just as Chouhi unleashes his ultimate technique, overpowering Chouryou, and destroying the Chouhankyou. At Choukou, the villagers of Keishuu, Kan-pei, Kan-u, Koumei, and the still unconscious Ryuubi gather. Koumei soon spots the Koutou reinforcements, led by Shuuyu. Ryuubi awakes, and is worried of the villagers' safety. Kan-u reports regretfully of Chouhi, and it seems like all is lost. Chouhi soon arrives, limping, but very much alive, much to everyone's joy. The episode ends with Sousou unfazed by his generals' defeat, and Ryuubi all set to meet Sonken.
46	"Sonken Stands"; Transliteration: "Sonken Tatsu" (Japanese: 孫権立つ)	February 12, 2011
The naval fleet headed by Shuuyu returns to Koutou, and most of the Son family are there to welcome Ryuubi. Ryuubi asks for Sonken, to which Sonshoukou replies he's at the castle. Ryuubi is happy that Sonken is willing to become an ally, although Sonshoukou shows little enthusiasm. At the castle, it is revealed that Sonken does not want to ally with Ryuubi at all, saying that at the moment, Sousou as no intention to attack Koutou. However, if the alliance is formed, Sousou will attack immediately, and Sonken wants to prevent that at all cost. Ryuubi is displeased at Sonken's reason, though, there isn't much he can do. Koumei then suggests that Sonken prove that the Koteitou is a symbol of the Three Sovereigns, and to do so by dueling with Ryuubi and his Ryuuteiken. The duel starts and both are evenly match. Ryuubi asks Sonken what his purpose to take up arms is, to which Sonken replies is to protect his family, both direct kin, generals, and the people of Koutou. Ryuubi is pleased, as he himself has the same purpose, to protect the people of Mirisha, and that Sonken's family is the people of Mirisha as well. With both purposes in sync, the Ryuuteiken and the Koteitou both resonate, and the two unleash their ultimate techniques, and the duel ends in a draw. Sonken then splits a boulder in half, commenting that he has severed all his hesitations, and agrees to form the alliance with Ryuubi.
47	"Tenraikahou (Fire Cannon of Thunder Strike)"; Transliteration: "Tenraikahou" (Japanese: 天雷火砲)	February 19, 2011
The episode begins with Sonshoukou, Rikuson, Ryomou and Kannei travelling up the foggy Choukou towards Sekiheki (赤壁), with Sonshoukou wanting to defeat Sousou. When the fog clears, they are shocked to see a huge water fortress before their eyes. Soon, an arrow shower is unleashed, and they are forced to retreat, much to Sonshoukou's displeasure. Back at Koutou, Kougai is mad, yet relieved at Sonshoukou's return. Ryuubi notices a letter attached to one of the arrows. It's a letter calling for Sonken's and Ryuubi's surrender. Ryuubi does not falter, but even with their combined strength of 25,000, it's still not enough against Sousou's one million in strength. Shuuyu approaches, and wants to show something to them. At a weaponry storehouse, there are numerous Siege Weapons (Actor: YMS-16M Xamel) and bombs. Shuuyu then reveals the Tenraikahou (天雷火砲). Everyone is impressed, and Kougetsuei Gun-EZ appears to explain the Tenraikahou. She also takes out a special kind of cannon ammunition, specially made for the Tenraikahou, that is capable of destroying hundreds of vessels, especially Sousou's water fortress. However, there's only one, so they can't afford to miss. The Tenraikahou also has a limitation, in that it can only be fire at a rather short range, meaning anyone that uses it will come under fire. Sonken decides to lead the water assault by disguising the Tenraikahou on a vessel, while Ryuubi leads the land forces to cover for Sonken. At the Koutou castle, Ryuubi and Sonken are admiring the peaceful view, when Kougai asks for their presence. The people of Koutou have made flower charms for all of them, blessing them success and a safe return. The episode ends with the Alliance all geared up for the coming battle at Sekiheki.
48	"Sekiheki's Decisive Battle"; Transliteration: "Sekiheki Daikessen" (Japanese: 赤壁大決戦)	February 26, 2011
The episode recaps Sousou setting up a water fortress at Sekiheki, and the Alliance between Ryuubi and Sonken preparing their assault. In the thick fog, Sonken's fleet slowly make their approach towards Sekiheki. When the fog clears, they are shocked to see that a whole fleet of Sousou ships have formed a defensive wall in front of Sousou's fortress. This fleet is led by Saibou Agguguy, an admiral of Keishuu. Sonken is shocked at this development, as Saibou orders an arrow shower. Sonken counters with his on-board Siege Weapon, but the ships remained unscathed. Saibou gloats, commenting that their ships are lined with steel. On the surrounding cliffs, Chouryou and his troops are preparing another arrow shower, but is foiled by Ryuubi and his cohorts. Sonken's fleet is slowly capsized by Saibou's fleet, and Sonken fears all is lost. However, Kougai has a plan of his own. As more of Sonken's ships are sunk, Kougai rides off on a jetski, pulling a large load of bombs behind him. He plans to ride into Saibou's fleet, and detonate the load. Sonken and Sonshoukou try in vain to call Kougai back, but he has made up his mind. Saibou orders another arrow shower, but Kougai presses on. Even after being shot by a few arrows, Kougai vows to accomplish his mission for Mirisha's future. He collides with the lead ship, and dies in the resulting explosion. The explosion kills off Saibou, and his entire fleet is engulfed in flames. With the path cleared, Sonken holds back his tears, and orders Shuuyu to fire the Tenraikahou. The blast hits Sousou's fortress straight on, and Tashiji believes they have won. However, Rikuson spots the fortress moving, and it is revealed that Sousou's true fortress is a huge metal battleship (basis is the Rewloola), the Tekkousenkan Shinkahouou (鉄甲戦艦 神火鳳凰). Sonken is in total dismal, as Sousou stands atop his battleship, and declares war on Sonken.
49	"Choukou Burns"; Transliteration: "Choukou Moyu" (Japanese: 長江燃ゆ)	March 5, 2011
The episode recaps the climactic battle at Sekiheki. Ryomou and Kannei tries to crash into the battleship, only to fail miserably. With Sousou ordering to start the engines to begin his conquest, he crashes into Sonken's flagship. Shuuyu vows to defeat Sousou, and passes his duties onto Rikuson, telling Rikuson to remember all that he has taught him. On the battleship, Kakuka gloats at the battleship's superiority, just as a scout reports a rear attack. Shiba-i is shocked to see it's Shuuyu. Kakuka sees him as not a threat, but that's changed when Shuuyu boards the battleship. Shuuyu declares a duel with Sousou, and Sousou accepts. Back at the surrounding cliffs, Ryuubi and his cohorts are repelling off Sousou's troops, with Chouhi dueling Kakouton and Kakouen, while Kan-u duels Chouryou. Rikuson has managed to rescue the survivors, just as he notices the duel. The duel is pretty one-sided, with Sousou blocking every strike of Shuuyu. Shuuyu uses a finishing technique, but his blade breaks after using it. Sousou is unimpressed, and shows Shuuyu the power of the Three Sovereigns as his Seihouken glows. Ryuubi's Ryuuteiken and Sonken's Koteitou also begins to glow. As the glow disappears, Shuuyu stands up and draws his arrow bow, and uses another finishing technique, but misses Sousou. Kakuka laughs, but Shiba-i is horrified as the technique hits one of the battleship's engines. With it destroyed, the battleship crashes into a cliff, and gets grounded. Sousou seems unfazed, saying that he can continue via land, and unleashes a new finishing technique upon Shuuyu. As Shuuyu burns in the technique's fire, he lands into the river, as Sonken cries out to him. Sousou turns away, just as Ryuubi boards the ship. Sousou faces him, as Ryuubi declares a duel.
50	"Radiance of the Dragon"; Transliteration: "Ryuu no Kagayaki" (Japanese: 龍の輝き)	March 19, 2011
The episode recaps Shuuyu's success in grounding Sousou's battleship, but is defeated by Sousou. Ryuubi starts his duel with Sousou, with both exchanging their views on the future of Mirisha. They are evenly matched, but Sousou edges out in the end. However, Ryuubi doesn't give up, which irks Sousou even more. Sousou summons the Gyokuji, and challenges Ryuubi, stating whether his ambition, or Ryuubi's compassion is Heaven's will. Over at Sonken's ship, they managed to fish up Shuuyu, who's barely alive. Tashiji is shocked at the pillar of light from Sousou's battleship, and Sonshoukou fears the worst. Sousou summons the Tengyokugai in Enhou form, and continues the duel. Ryuubi is seriously outmatched, but does not give in. Sousou unleashes another attack, to which Ryuubi blocks head-on, however both his Ryuuteiken and Shin Souryuutou (真爪龍刀) shatter in the attack, and he is seemingly defeated as he plunges into the river. Sousou declares his victory over Ryuubi, as Sonken, Sonshoukou, Kan-u, Koumei, and Chouhi are in a state of disbelief. Deep in the depths of the river, Ryuubi seems to be in a state of limbo, as a strange blue light beckons to him. Ryuubi soon encounters Kousonsan, telling Ryuubi that he is not ready to die yet. Roshoku appears as well, asking what is Ryuubi's source of dedication. Ryuubi remembers his cohorts, and is renewed with new energy. Roshoku comments that Ryuubi is ready to mature into a real dragon, as Kousonsan, Kougai, Touken, Sonken Zephyranthes and Sonsaku look on. Ryuubi calls out to the blue light, which is revealed to be the spirit of the Dragon Emperor, and combines with it to become Shouretsutei Ryuusou Ryuubi Gundam. Ryuubi returns to the surface, much to the surprise of everyone. Shiba-i states that whether is written in the G-Chronicles is coming true. Sousou is further enraged as Ryuubi states that Sousou isn't the only one with a power bestowed from the Heavens, and that he will defeat Sousou once and for all. On Sonken's ship, Shuuyu regains consciousness, and states that the Koteitou is glowing. Sonken ponders if this is a sign of the Three Sovereigns calling out to him. The episode ends with Sousou and Ryuubi clashing head-on once more.
51	"Legacy of the Three Kingdoms"; Transliteration: "Sango no Kokorozashi" (Japanese: 三国の志)	March 26, 2011
The story recaps how Ryuubi becomes Shouretsutei Ryuusou Ryuubi Gundam. Upon Shuuyu's request, Sonken joins in the battle, calling out to Sonken Zephyranthes and Sonsaku for courage. Sousou and Ryuubi are evenly matched, as Sonken interferes. Sousou is enraged at Sonken interfering with his will, the Heaven's will. Sonken comments that he'll do anything to protect his family, and Ryuubi comment that it's Heaven's will to help the people. The two's conviction impresses Sousou, but he will not let the two interfere in his ambition. Just then, the Gyokuji glows and leaves Sousou, bathing Ryuubi and Sonken in its golden light. Shiba-i and Kakuka rushes to the deck of the battleship, and witnesses Sonken in Tengyokugai Douko form, and Ryuubi in Tengyokugai Souryuu (蒼龍) form. Kakuka is shocked to see 3 Tengyokugais, as Shiba-i explains that the 3, having inherited the souls of the Three Sovereigns, have shaken the foundations of Heaven itself, and that the following battle is one of legendary status, one that the G-Chronicles has failed to predict. The three heroes summon up their Sovereign spirits as they fly towards their final battlefield, outer space. The three clash with all their strength, and at the final blow, a huge star (one would recognize it as the star of Ryuubi's Dragon Star Slash) forms over Mirisha. Sousou is appalled, appalled that he has lost to Sonken and Ryuubi's strength, a strength that comes from compassion for the people. As the Tengyokugai disintegrates around him, Sousou comments that their duel is not over, and that a new era has begun on this day, a day where Mirisha is ruled by compassion. As Sousou's Tengyokugai explodes, he plummets through the atmosphere, and seemingly explodes into millions of meteors that streak across Mirisha's night sky. His Seihouken lands back on the ground, as Kakouton fears the worst. Chouryou drops his weapons, and wants Kan-u to kill him; however, Kan-u tells him to live on. Kakuka cannot believe Sousou is dead, but Shiba-i assures him that Sousou isn't, and that they will carry on his will to unify Mirisha. The Gyokuji drifts off into the depths of space, as some time has passed on Mirisha. At Rakuyou, Souhi Gundam asks Shiba-i if Sousou has been found. Shiba-i, now as Giga Taifu (機駕太傅), updates him that the search is still ongoing. Souhi thanks Shiba-i, and Sousou for helping him to find, and build his kingdom. In front of his troops, Souhi gives a speech, to remember the events of Sekiheki, and that with the formation of their kingdom, Giga (機駕), they will carry on Sousou's will. At Koutou, the Son family pays respect to Sonken Zephyranthes, Sonsaku and all the fallen troops. Sonshoukou informs them of the formation of their kingdom, Gou (轟). Sonken swears that he will do everything to protect their kingdom and family. Shuuyu is relieved, and comments on joining Sonsaku, and he soon dies peacefully in his chair. At Ekishuu (益州), Ryuubi and his faction are almost at their destination, when Chouhi complains of tiredness. Chou-un is glad of Ryuubi's safe return, as it is a boost to the people's moral and trust. As Ryuubi thanks them, Koumei signals to them that they have arrived. Ryuubi comments that without the people, there will be no kingdom, to which Koumei agrees, and their kingdom, Shou (翔), is formed. The episode ends with Ryuubi looking forward to the bright future that they will create.

== Movie list ==
=== Chō Denei-ban SD Gundam Sangokuden Brave Battle Warriors ===
Chō Denei-ban SD Gundam Sangokuden Brave Battle Warriors (超電影版SDガンダム三国伝 BraveBattleWarriors) is a special movie episode that aired after the fifth Sgt. Frog (Keroro Gunsō) film, Chō Gekijō-ban Keroro Gunsō Tanjō! Kyūkyoku Keroro Kiseki no Jikūjima de Arimasu!! (超劇場版ケロロ軍曹 誕生!究極ケロロ 奇跡の時空島であります!!). The story is set chronologically during episode 4 of the SD Gundam Sangokuden Brave Battle Warriors anime series, after Toutaku has Reitei assassinated, and before Sousou tries to assassinate Toutaku.

No.	Title	Original release date
Movie	"Super Movie Version SD Gundam Sangokuden Brave Battle Warriors"; Transliteration: "Chō Denei-ban Esudī Gandamu Sangokuden Brave Battle Warriors" (Japanese: 超電影版SDガンダム三国伝 BraveBattleWarriors)	February 27, 2010
The story begins with the three sworn brothers being chased by some Toutaku troops. Forced to a cliff, the three engaged the troops, easily overpowering them with their finishing techniques. Just then, on a bridge at the cliff, Koshin Gyan taunts the 3, with Chouhi falling into Koshin's trap. Koshin leaps out of the way, and destroys the bridge, causing the three sworn brothers to fall into the river below. Back at Rakuyou, Koshin reports back to Toutaku on his victory, but Toutaku is infuriated that Koshin failed to obtain the Ryuuteiken from Ryuubi. Koshin stakes his life and his title of Chinkou Shougun (鎮江将軍) to steal the Ryuuteiken. Ryuubi wakes up from the incident, after he dreamt of a dragon spirit in the river swallowing him. The three sworn brothers were saved by Bachou Blue Destiny, who found them washed up by the river. Ryuubi thanks Bachou, just as a villager bears news of an invasion. Ryuubi suspects it's more of Toutaku's troops, and the 3 rushes off to intercept them but Ryuubi notices he has lost the Ryuuteiken. Bachou tries to stop Ryuubi, but Ryuubi insists that he will help shape Mirisha's future with his own hands, even without the Ryuuteiken. The Toutaku troops are led by Koshin, and is pleased to see the three sworn brothers. The troops are again overpowered, but Koshin overpowers the 3 with another finishing technique. Bachou just cannot stand by and watch, and rushes back to the river to find the Ryuuteiken. He dives near the foot of a waterfall that's known to contain a dragon spirit. He soon encounters the spirit, to which it asks what is Bachou's purpose. Back at the duel, Ryuubi stands up against Koshin, and in unison with Bachou, proclaims to help Mirisha. The Ryuuteiken appears before Ryuubi's feet; Bachou found it thanks to the dragon spirit. Bachou and the village children cheers the three sworn brothers on (Bachou even asks the viewers to join in the cheering), and soon, Kan-u and Chouhi stands up again, and the three perform the Holy Trinity. Koshin is then destroyed. On a cliff, Ryofu, atop Sekitoba, comments on how he's have fun with the successor of the Ryuuteiken.
