= Battle of Red Cliffs =

Battle on the Yangtze River (208 AD)

Coordinates: 29°52′11″N 113°37′13″E

- Part of the wars at the end of the Han dynasty
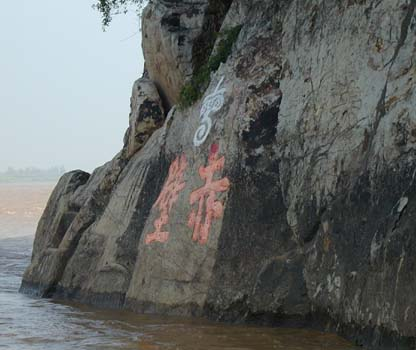
- Engravings on a cliff-side near a widely accepted candidate site for the battlefield, in the vicinity of Chibi, Hubei. The engravings are at least 1000 years old, and include the Chinese characters 赤壁 ('red cliffs') written from right to left.
Date	Winter, 208 AD (Note: The 13th year of the Jian'an era has 13 months, with a leap 12th month. The 10th to leap 12th months of the year correspond to 27 Oct 208 to 21 Feb 209 in the Julian calendar.)
Location	Yangtze River, China (Note: The precise location is debated, see § Location.)
Result	Allied victory
Territorial changes	Cao Cao fails to gain a foothold south of the Yangtze; Liu Bei gains Jingzhou

Belligerents
Forces of Sun Quan; Forces of Liu Bei; Forces of Liu Qi	Forces of Cao Cao

Commanders and leaders
Zhou Yu; Cheng Pu; Liu Bei; Liu Qi; Zhuge Liang	Cao Cao

Strength
50,000	800,000 (Cao Cao's claim); 220,000–240,000 (Zhou Yu's estimate)

Casualties and losses
Unknown	Heavy

Battle of Red Cliffs
- Traditional Chinese: 赤壁之戰
- Simplified Chinese: 赤壁之战
Transcriptions
Standard Mandarin
- Hanyu Pinyin: Chìbì zhī zhàn
- IPA: [ʈʂʰɨ̂.pî ʈʂɨ́ ʈʂân]
Yue: Cantonese
- Yale Romanization: Jek-bīk jī jin
- Jyutping: Cek3-bik1 zi1 zin3
- IPA: [tsʰɛk̚˧.pɪk̚˥ tsi˥ tsin˧]
Southern Min
- Hokkien POJ: Chhek-pek chi chiàn

The Battle of Red Cliffs, also known as the Battle of Chibi, was a decisive naval battle in China that took place during the winter of 208–209 AD. It was fought on the Yangtze River between the forces of warlords controlling different parts of the country during the end of the Han dynasty. The allied forces of Sun Quan, Liu Bei, and Liu Qi based south of the Yangtze defeated the numerically superior forces of the northern warlord Cao Cao. By doing so, Liu Bei and Sun Quan prevented Cao Cao from conquering any lands south of the Yangtze, frustrating Cao Cao's efforts to reunify the territories formerly held by the Eastern Han dynasty.

The allied victory at Red Cliffs ensured the survival of Liu Bei and Sun Quan and left them in control of the Yangtze, establishing defensible frontiers that would later serve as the basis for the states of Shu Han and Eastern Wu during the Three Kingdoms period (220–280 AD). Historians have arrived at different conclusions in their attempts to reconstruct the timeline of events at Red Cliffs. The location of the battlefield itself remains a subject of debate: most scholars consider either a location southwest of present-day Wuhan, or a location northeast of Baqiu in present-day Yueyang, Hunan as plausible candidate sites for the battle. The battle has been the subject of or influenced numerous poems, dramas, movies and games.

== Background ==
By the early 3rd century AD, the Han dynasty, now nearly four centuries old, was crumbling. Emperor Xian, who acceded to the throne in 189 at age eight, was a political figurehead with no control over the regional warlords. Cao Cao was one of the most powerful warlords. He hosted the emperor in his capital at Ye, which gave him a measure of control over the emperor in addition to an air of legitimacy. In 200 he had defeated his main rival Yuan Shao at Guandu, reunifying northern China and giving him control of the North China Plain. In the winter of 207 he secured his northern flank by defeating the Wuhuan people at the Battle of White Wolf Mountain. Upon returning to Ye in 208, Cao Cao was appointed Chancellor upon his own recommendation, which effectively gave him control of the imperial government.

Cao Cao's southern campaign started shortly after in the autumn of 208. The section of the Yangtze flowing through Jing Province was the first target; capturing the naval base at Jiangling and securing naval control of the province's stretch of the Yangtze were necessary to secure access to the south. He was opposed by the warlords Liu Biao and Sun Quan. Liu Biao, the governor of Jing, controlled the Yangtze west of the Han River's mouth, which roughly encompassed the territory around the city of Xiakou and to the south. Sun Quan controlled the Yangtze east of the Han and the southeastern territories abutting it. Liu Bei, another warlord, was in Fancheng, having fled to Liu Biao from the northeast after a failed plot to assassinate Cao Cao and restore imperial power.

Initially, Cao Cao achieved rapid success. Jing was in a poor state. Its armies were exhausted by conflict with Sun Quan to the south. Furthermore, there was political division as Liu Biao's sons, the elder Liu Qi and the younger Liu Cong, sought to succeed their father. Liu Cong prevailed, and Liu Qi was relegated to the commandery of Jiangxia. Liu Biao died of illness only a few weeks later. Liu Cong surrendered to an advancing Cao Cao, giving him a sizeable fleet and Jiangling as a forward operating base.

Cao Cao's advance forced Liu Bei into a disorganised southward retreat accompanied by refugees and pursued by Cao Cao's elite cavalry. Liu Bei was surrounded and decisively defeated at the Battle of Changban but escaped eastward to Xiakou, where he liaised with Sun Quan's emissary Lu Su. Historical accounts are inconsistent: Lu Su may have successfully encouraged Liu Bei to move further east to Fankou (樊口, near present-day Ezhou, Hubei). (Note: Chen Shou's Records of the Three Kingdoms repeatedly asserts that Liu Bei was at Xiakou. Other historical accounts support that version as well. Annotations to the text of the Records of the Three Kingdoms made nearly two centuries later by Pei Songzhi carry Xiakou in the base text and Fankou in the annotations. That discrepancy is later reflected in contradictory passages in the Zizhi Tongjian by Sima Guang (and its English translation), which has Liu Bei "quartered at Fankou" at the same time as Zhou Yu is requesting to send troops to Xiakou, and Liu Bei "waits anxiously" in Xiakou for the reinforcements.) In any case, Liu Bei was later joined by Liu Qi and levies from Jiangxia.

Liu Bei's main advisor, Zhuge Liang, was sent to Chaisang (柴桑), present-day Jiujiang, Jiangxi, to negotiate an alliance with Sun Quan against Cao Cao. Zhuge Liang told Sun Quan that Liu Bei and Liu Qi each had 10,000 men; these numbers may have been exaggerated, but however large a force the pair fielded was no match against Cao Cao's in an open battle. Sun Quan received a letter from Cao Cao prior to Zhuge Liang's arrival; in it, Cao Cao claimed to have an army of 800,000 and hinted that he wanted Sun Quan to surrender. Zhang Zhao, Sun Quan's chief clerk, supported surrendering based on the disparity in forces. Zhuge Liang was supported by Lu Su and Zhou Yu, Sun Quan's chief commander. Sun Quan agreed to the alliance; he chopped off a corner of his desk during an assembly and stated, "Anyone who still dares argue for surrender will be [treated] the same as this desk." Zhou Yu, Cheng Pu, and Lu Su were assigned 30,000 men and sent to aid Liu Bei. With Liu Bei's 20,000 soldiers, the alliance had approximately 50,000 marines who were trained and prepared for battle.

Zhou Yu estimated Cao Cao's strength to be closer to 230,000. This included between 70 and 80 thousand men impressed from Ying, and whose morale and loyalty to Cao Cao were uncertain. Cao Cao's invasion force also included non-combatants: not only those who worked in supplies and communication, but also the wives and children of some of the soldiers.

== Battle ==
Battle of Red Cliffs and Cao Cao's retreat. The marked battlefield location corresponds to the candidate site near Chibi City

The Battle of Red Cliffs opened with an attempt by Cao Cao's forces to establish a bridgehead across the Yangtze, which failed. Both sides then retreated to their established positions on either bank of the Yangtze. Following this, a naval engagement began on the river itself, accompanied by an allied land offensive. This sequence proved to be decisive, and Cao Cao's forces were routed. During the subsequent retreat, Cao Cao's men were bogged down in mud and suffered greatly from disease. Cao Cao ultimately managed to escape after reaching Huarong Pass.

The combined Sun–Liu force sailed upstream from either Xiakou or Fankou to Red Cliffs, where they encountered Cao Cao's vanguard force. Plagued by disease and low morale because of the series of forced marches that they had undertaken on the prolonged southern campaign, Cao Cao's men could not gain an advantage in the small skirmish which ensued and so he retreated to Wulin (烏林), north of the river, and the allies pulled back to the south.

Cao Cao had chained his ships from stem to stern, possibly with the aim of reducing seasickness in his navy, which was composed mostly of northerners who were not used to living on ships. Observing that, the divisional commander Huang Gai sent Cao Cao a letter feigning surrender and prepared a squadron (Note: The number of vessels in the squadron is unclear. As de Crespigny observes, "Firstly, the Records of the Three Kingdoms states that the number of vessels in Huang Gai's squadron was 'several tens,' but the parallel passage in Zizhi Tongjian... allocates Huang Gai only ten ships".) of capital ships described as mengchong doujian (蒙衝鬥艦). (Note: The exact nature of the vessels is unclear. Zhang Xiugui refers to them as "leather-covered assault warships", but the reference is parenthetical, as that issue is peripheral to the topic of Zhang's paper. In a lengthier discussion, Rafe de Crespigny separates the two terms, describing the mengchong as "... covered with some form of protective material ... used to break the enemy line of battle and perhaps to damage their ships and men with a ram or by projectiles" and doujian as "... fighting platforms for spearmen and archers to engage in close combat ...". He concludes that mengchong doujian is a "general description for vessels of war".) The ships had been converted into fire ships by filling them with bundles of kindling, dry reeds, and fatty oil. As Huang Gai's "defecting" squadron approached the mid-point of the river, the sailors applied fire to the ships before they took to small boats. The unmanned fire ships, carried by the southeastern wind, sped towards Cao Cao's fleet and set it ablaze. Many men and horses either burned to death or drowned.

Following the initial shock, Zhou Yu and the allies led a lightly armed force to capitalise on the assault. The northern army was thrown into confusion and utterly defeated. Seeing that the situation was hopeless, Cao Cao then issued a general order of retreat and destroyed a number of his remaining ships before he withdrew.

Cao Cao's army attempted a retreat along Huarong Road, including a long stretch passing through marshlands north of Dongting Lake. Heavy rains had made the road so treacherous that many of the sick soldiers had to carry bundles of grass on their backs and use them to fill the road to allow the horsemen to cross. Many of these soldiers drowned in the mud or were trampled to death in the effort. The allies, led by Zhou Yu and Liu Bei, gave chase over land and water until they reached Nan Commandery; the chase combined with famine and disease ravaged Cao Cao's remaining forces. Cao Cao then retreated north to his home base of Yecheng, leaving Cao Ren and Xu Huang to guard Jiangling, Yue Jin stationed in Xiangyang, and Man Chong in Dangyang.

The allied counterattack might have vanquished Cao Cao and his forces entirely. However, the crossing of the Yangtze River had dissolved into chaos as the allied armies converged on the riverbank and fought over the limited number of ferries. To restore order, a detachment led by Sun Quan's general Gan Ning established a bridgehead in Yiling to the north, and only a staunch rearguard action by Cao Ren prevented a further catastrophe.

== Analysis ==
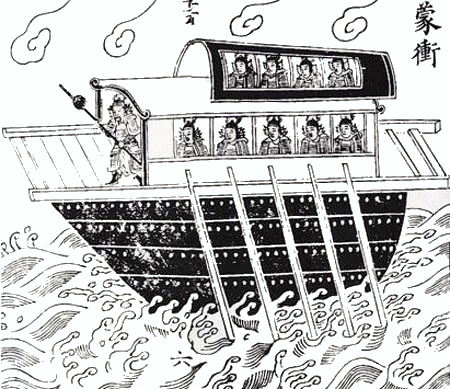
A depiction of a mengchong, an assault warship used in the battle that was covered in leather and designed to break enemy lines – the Wujing Zongyao, c. 1040

A combination of Cao Cao's strategic errors and the effectiveness of Huang Gai's ruse had resulted in the allied victory at the Battle of Red Cliffs. Zhou Yu had observed that Cao Cao's generals and soldiers were mostly from the cavalry and infantry, and just a few had any experience in naval warfare. Cao Cao also had little support among the people of Jing Province and so lacked a secure forward base of operations. Despite the strategic acumen that Cao Cao had displayed in earlier campaigns and battles, he had simply assumed in this case that numerical superiority would eventually defeat the Sun and Liu navy. Cao's first tactical mistake was converting his massive army of infantry and cavalry into a marine corps and navy. With only a few days of drills before the battle, Cao Cao's troops were debilitated by sea-sickness and lack of experience on water. Tropical diseases to which the southerners were largely immune were also rampant in Cao Cao's camps. Although numerous, Cao Cao's men were already exhausted by the unfamiliar environment and the extended southern campaign, as Zhuge Liang observed: "Even a powerful arrow at the end of its flight cannot penetrate a silk cloth."

Jia Xu, a key advisor to Cao Cao had recommended after the surrender of Liu Cong for the overtaxed armies to be given time to rest and replenish before they engaged the armies of Sun Quan and Liu Bei, but Cao Cao disregarded that advice. Cao Cao's own thoughts regarding his failure at Red Cliffs suggest that he held his own actions and misfortunes responsible for the defeat, rather than the strategies used by his enemy during the battle: "it was only because of the sickness that I burnt my ships and retreated. It is out of all reason for Zhou Yu to take the credit for himself."

== Aftermath ==
By the end of 209, the post that Cao Cao had established at Jiangling fell to Zhou Yu. The borders of the land under Cao Cao's control contracted about 160 kilometres (99 mi), to the area around Xiangyang. For the victors of the battle, however, the question arose on how to share the spoils. Initially, Liu Bei and Liu Qi both expected rewards, having participated in the success at Red Cliffs, and both had also become entrenched in Jing Province. Liu Qi was appointed Inspector of Jing Province, but his rule in the region, centred at Jiangxia Commandery, was short-lived. A few months after the Battle of Red Cliffs, he died of sickness. His lands were mostly absorbed by Sun Quan. However, with Liu Qi dead, Liu Bei laid claim to the title of Inspector of Jing Province and began to occupy much of it. He gained control of four commanderies south of the Yangtze in Wuling, Changsha, Lingling, and Guiyang. Sun Quan's troops had suffered far greater casualties than Liu Bei's in the extended conflict against Cao Ren following the Battle of Red Cliffs, and the death of Zhou Yu in 210 resulted in a drastic weakening of Sun Quan's strength in Jing Province.

As Liu Bei occupied Jing Province, which Cao Cao had recently lost, he gained a strategic and naturally-fortified area on the Yangtze River that Sun Quan still wanted for himself. The control of Jing Province provided Liu Bei with virtually-unlimited access to the passage into Yi Province and important waterways into Wu (southeastern China) as well as dominion of the southern Yangtze River. Never again would Cao Cao command so large a fleet as he did at Jiangling, and he never had another similar opportunity to destroy his southern rivals. The Battle of Red Cliffs and the capture of Jing Province by Liu Bei confirmed the separation of southern China from the northern heartland of the Yellow River valley and foreshadowed a north–south axis of hostility that would continue for centuries.

== Location ==
Three possible locations for the Battle of Red Cliffs. A fourth possibility is an undefined locale in Jiayu County, downriver (northeast) of Chibi City.

The precise location of the Red Cliffs battlefield has never been conclusively established, and has long been the subject of both popular and academic debate. Scholars have contested the subject for at least 1350 years, with numerous sites having arguments put forward in their favour. There are clear grounds for rejecting some of these proposals; broadly speaking, four locations are still advocated for. According to Zhang, many of the current debates stem from the fact that the course and length of the Yangtze between Wulin and Wuhan has changed since the Sui and Tang dynasties. The modern debate is also complicated by the fact that the names of some of the key locations have changed over the following centuries. For example, modern Huarong County is located in Hunan, south of the Yangtze, but in the 3rd century, the city of that name was due east of Jiangling, considerably north of the Yangtze. Puqi (蒲圻), one of the candidate sites, was renamed "Chibi City" in 1998, in an attempt to spur local tourism.

Historical records state that Cao Cao's forces retreated north across the Yangtze after the initial engagement at Red Cliffs, which unequivocally places the battle site on the southern bank of the Yangtze. For this reason, a number of sites on the northern bank have been discounted by historians and geographers. Historical accounts also establish eastern and western boundaries for a stretch of the Yangtze that encompasses all of the possible sites for the battlefield. The allied forces travelled upstream from either Fankou or Xiakou. Since the Yangtze flows roughly eastward towards the ocean with northeast and southeast meanders, Red Cliffs must at least be west of Fankou, which is farther downstream. The westernmost boundary is also clear since Cao Cao's eastern advance from Jiangling included passing Baqiu, near present-day Yueyang, Hunan, on the shore of Dongting Lake. The battle must also have been downstream (that is, northeast) of that place.

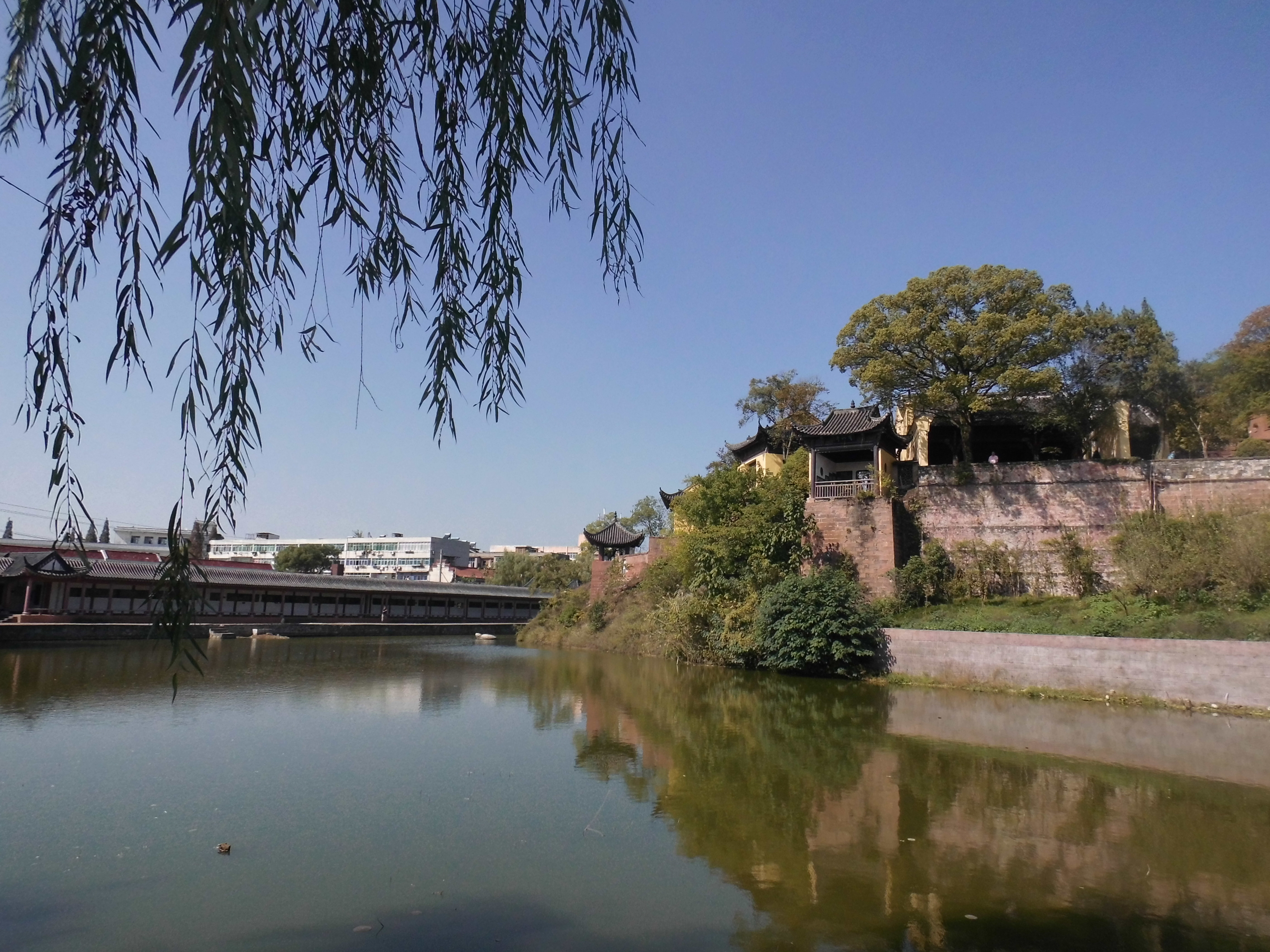
Su Dongpo's Red Cliffs in Huangzhou

One popular candidate for the battle site is Chibi Hill in Huangzhou, sometimes referred to as "Su Dongpo's Red Cliffs" or the "Literary Red Cliffs" (文赤壁). This conjecture arises largely from the famous 11th-century poem "First Ode on the Red Cliffs", which presents the Huangzhou hill as the location where the battle took place. The cliff's name is "Chibi", though written with different second character (赤鼻; 'red nose'). The contemporaneous pronunciation of the two names were also different, which is reflected by their distinct pronunciations in many non-Mandarin dialects. Consequently, virtually all scholars have dismissed the connection. The site is also on the north bank of the Yangtze and is directly across from Fankou, rather than upstream from it. If the allied Sun-Liu forces left from Xiakou rather than Fankou, as the oldest historical sources suggest, the hill in Huangzhou would have been downstream from the point of departure, a possibility that cannot be reconciled with historical sources.

Chibi City, formerly named Puqi, is possibly the most widely accepted candidate. To differentiate from Su's site, the site is also referred to as the "Military Red Cliffs" (武赤壁). It is directly across the Yangtze from Wulin. This argument was first proposed in the early Tang dynasty. There are also characters engraved in the cliffs which suggested that was the site of the battle. The origin of the engraving can be dated to between the Tang and Song dynasties, which makes it at least 1,000 years old.

Some sources mention the southern banks of the Yangtze in Jiayu County (嘉鱼县) in the prefecture-level city of Xianning in Hubei as a possible location. This would place the battlefield downstream from Chibi City, a view that is supported by scholars of Chinese history who follow the Shui Jing Zhu, such as Rafe de Crespigny and Zhu Dongrun.

Another candidate is Wuhan, which straddles the Yangtze at its confluence with the Han River. It is east of both Wulin and Jiayu, as well as Chibi City on the opposite bank. The metropolis was incorporated by joining the three cities of Wuchang, Hankou, and Hanyang. There is a local belief in Wuhan that the battle was fought at the junction of the rivers, southwest of the former Wuchang city, now part of Wuhan. Zhang asserts that the Chibi battlefield was amongst a set of hills in Wuchang levelled in the 1930s so that their stone could be used as raw material. The local topography narrows the width of the Yangtze by a substantial margin, and the Wuhan area was strategically important. Citing several historical-geographical studies, Zhang shows that earlier accounts place the battlefield in Wuchang. In particular, the 5th-century provincial history Jingzhou ji (荊州記) by Sheng Hongzhi places the battlefield 160 li (approx. 80 km or 50 mi) downstream from Wulin, but since the Paizhou and Lukou meanders grew at some point during the Sui and Tang dynasties, the length of the Yangtze between Wuli and Wuchang increased by 100 li (approx. 50 km or 31 mi); later works do not regard Wuchang as a plausible site.

== Cultural impact ==
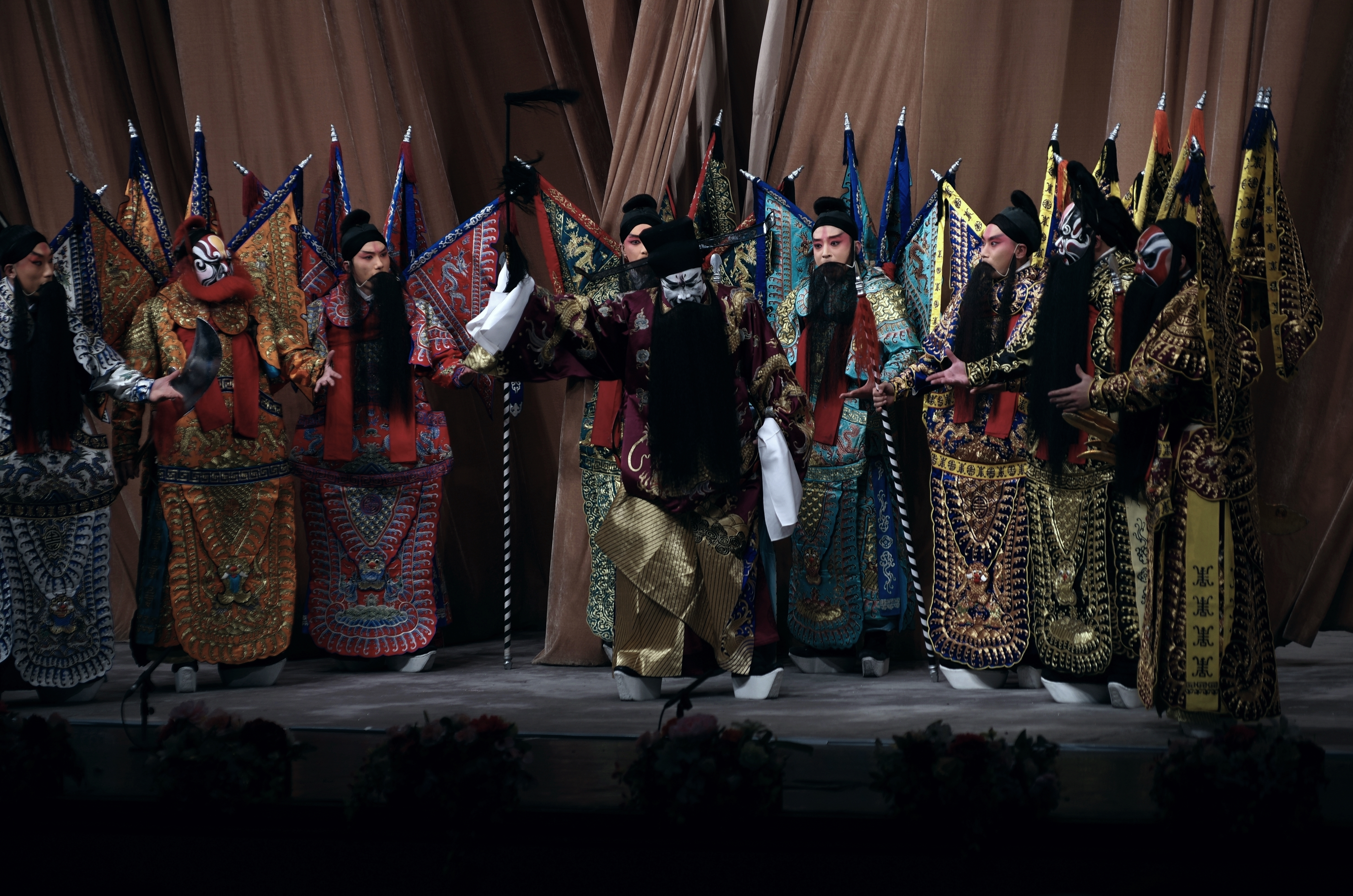
Cao Cao surrounded by his generals, as depicted by the Jingju Theatre Company

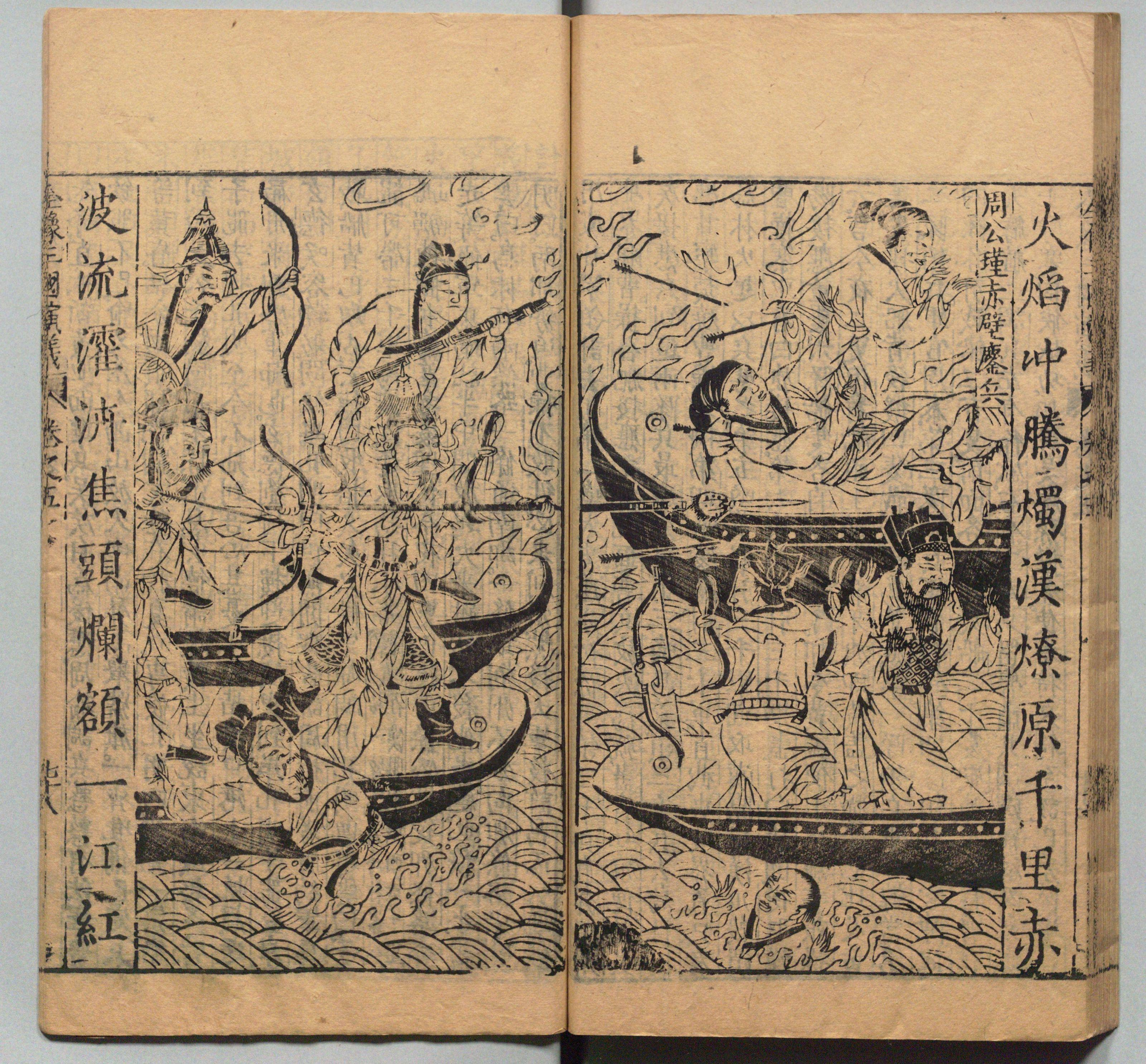
Woodblock illustration of the battle, from a Ming dynasty copy of the Romance of the Three Kingdoms

Some of the most well-known works by the Song-era poet Su Dongpo depict the battle and its surrounding environment. While exiled to Huangzhou (黃州; now Huanggang, Hubei), he composed three widely anthologised pieces on the Red Cliff motif: two fu rhapsodies and one ci lyric. In 2010, a memorial museum dedicated to Su was established in Huanggang.

Many video games set in the Three Kingdoms period — including Koei's Dynasty Warriors series, Sangokushi Koumeiden, the Warriors Orochi series, Destiny of an Emperor, Kessen II, and Total War: Three Kingdoms — have playable scenarios featuring the battle. The 2008 film Red Cliff, directed by Hong Kong filmmaker John Woo, is an adaption of the folk history surrounding the battle. Upon its release in China, Red Cliff set a new box office record for a domestically produced film.

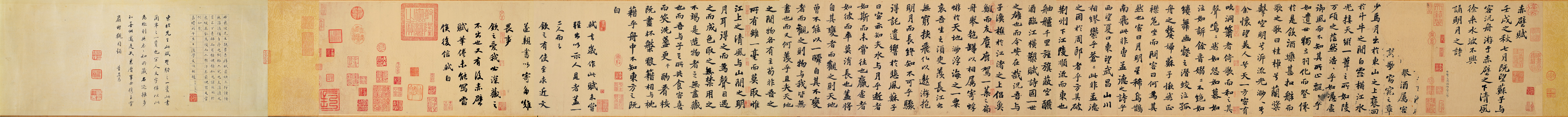
A handscroll copy of "Former Ode on the Red Cliffs" by Su Dongpo, dating to the Northern Song dynasty – National Palace Museum, Taipei

== Sources ==
- Chen Shou (1959) [c. 280]. Sānguó zhì 三國志 [History of the Three Kingdoms] (in Literary Chinese) (Reprint ed.). Beijing: Zhonghua shuju. ISBN 978-7-101-00307-9.
- Sima Guang, ed. (1969) [1084]. The Last of the Han. Translated by de Crespigny, Rafe. Canberra: Centre of Oriental Studies, Australian National University. ISBN 978-0-7081-0163-6. Annotated translation of chapters 58–68 of the Zizhi Tongjian.
- ———, ed. (1996) [1084]. To Establish Peace (PDF). Translated by de Crespigny, Rafe (2020 Internet ed.). Canberra: Australian National University. hdl:1885/42049. ISBN 978-0-7315-2537-9. Annotated translation of chapters 59–63 of the Zizhi Tongjian.
- de Crespigny, Rafe (2018) [1990]. Generals of the South: The Foundation and Early History of the Three Kingdoms State of Wu (Internet ed.). Canberra: Australian National University. ISBN 978-0-7315-0901-0.
- ——— (2003). The Three Kingdoms and Western Jin: A History of China in the Third Century AD (Internet ed.). hdl:1885/41896. Archived from the original on 2 April 2012.
- ——— (2007). A Biographical Dictionary of Later Han to the Three Kingdoms (23–220 AD). Leiden, Boston: Brill. doi:10.1163/ej.9789004156050.i-1311. ISBN 978-90-04-15605-0.
- ——— (2010). "Red Cliffs. 208". Imperial Warlord: A Biography of Cao Cao 155–220 AD. Sinica Leidensia, vol. 99. Leiden: Brill. pp. 241–286. doi:10.1163/ej.9789004185227.i-554.39. ISBN 978-90-04-18830-3.
- Dien, Albert E.; Knapp, Keith N., eds. (2019). The Six Dynasties, 220–589. The Cambridge History of China. Vol. 2. Cambridge University Press. doi:10.1017/9781139107334. ISBN 978-1-107-02077-1.
  - Farmer, J. Michael. "Shu-Han". In Dien & Knapp (2019), pp. 66–78.
- Eikenberry, Karl W. (1994). "The campaigns of Cao Cao". Military Review. 74 (8): 56–64. ISSN 0026-4148.
- Fitzgerald, Charles P. (1985). Why China? Recollections of China 1923–1950. Melbourne University Press. ISBN 978-0-522-84300-2.
- Chen Shou (1977) [429]. Pei Songzhi (ed.). Annotated Records of the Three Kingdoms 三國志注 (in Literary Chinese). Taipei: Dingwen. OCLC 41367032.
- Yu Pu (虞溥) (c. 300). Jiāng biǎo zhuàn 江表傳 (Private history) (in Literary Chinese).
- The Military Documents Research Organization of the Wuhan Military District (武汉部队司令部軍事资料研究组编) (1979). 中國古代戰争一百例 [One Hundred Battles of Ancient Chinese History] (in Chinese). Wuhan: Hubei renmin chubanshe. OCLC 23071752.
- Tian, Xiaofei (2018). "Restoring the Broken Halberd". The Halberd at Red Cliff: Jian'an and the Three Kingdoms. Harvard–Yenching Monograph Series. Vol. 108. Harvard University Press. pp. 281–345. doi:10.1163/9781684170920_007. ISBN 978-1-68417-092-0.
- Zhang Xiugui (張修桂) (2006). "Ancient "Red Cliff" battlefield: a historical-geographic study". Frontiers of History in China. 1 (2). Translated by Han, Zhaoqing; Simonis, Fabien: 214–235. doi:10.1007/s11462-006-0003-3. ISSN 1673-3401.
