= Former Ode on the Red Cliffs =

Piece written by the Chinese poet Su Shi

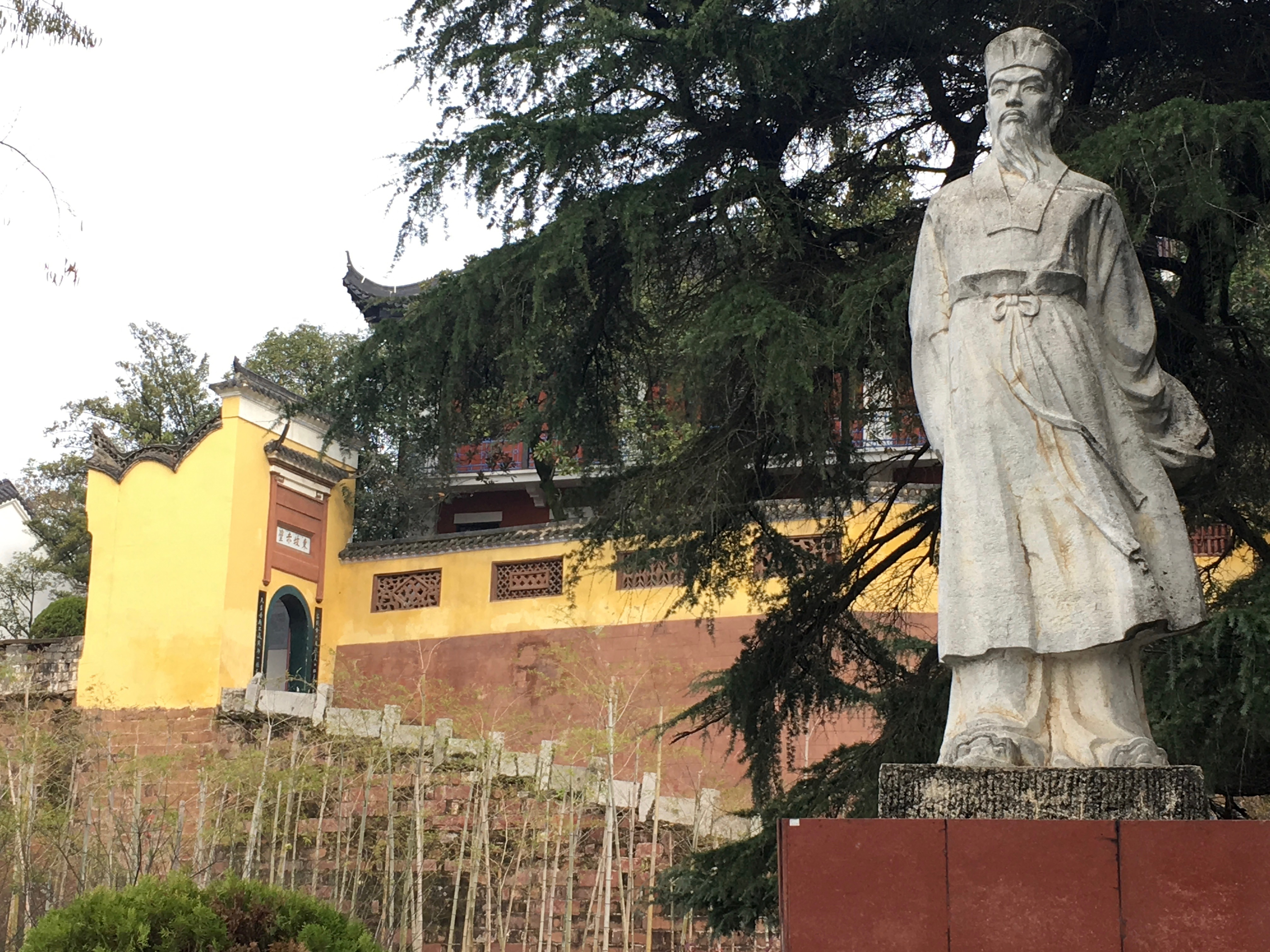
Statue of Su Dongpo near the hill he alluded to being the site of the battle, in present-day Huanggang, Hubei

The "Former Ode on the Red Cliffs" (Chinese: 前赤壁赋; pinyin: qián chìbì fù) is a piece of writing written by the Chinese poet Su Shi in 1082, describing a trip that Su Shi took with his friends on the Yangtze River, which took them past the purported site of the Battle of Red Cliffs. It is in the fu form.

== Background ==
After Su Shi was arrested for his poetry satirizing policies of the Song court, known as the Crow Terrace Poetry Trial, he was demoted to serve as the deputy of the regiment (团练副使) of Huangzhou.

== Synopsis ==
The author and his friends took a boat trip by the Red Cliffs. He sang a song, and one of his friends accompanied him with a xiao, a traditional Chinese flute. The tune was sad, so the author asked why. The guest said that the place reminded him of Cao Cao, who had been a hero of an era, but was no longer there. This made him realize the insignificance of human beings in comparison to the river and universe. Su Shi, however, considered the matter from a relativism aspect that both an individual and nature can be constantly changeable or immortal. He also pointed out that everything has its own owner, so one should not take what does not belong to him/her, except those eternal treasures of the creator like the moon or wind which everyone can enjoy. The guest was delighted at last and fell asleep along with the author.

There are two rhapsodies.

== Artwork ==
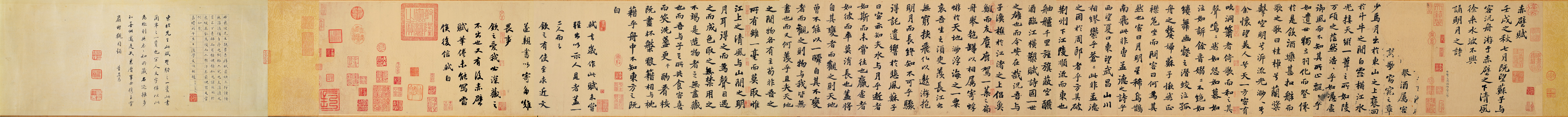
"Former Ode on the Red Cliff", personally written by Su Shi, housed in the National Palace Museum
