= Edward A. Kracke Jr. =

American historian

- Born: January 22, 1908; Brooklyn, New York
- Died: July 8, 1976 (aged 68); Cambridge, Massachusetts
- Spouse: Joan Kracke (née Hocking)
- Children: 2

Academic background
- Education: Harvard University

Academic work
- Discipline: Chinese history
- Institutions: Office of Strategic Services; U.S. Department of State; University of Chicago
- Notable students: John W. Chaffee

Chinese name
- Chinese: 柯睿格
Transcriptions
Standard Mandarin
- Hanyu Pinyin: Kē Ruìgé

Edward A. Kracke Jr. (January 22, 1908 – July 8, 1976) was an American historian of China at the University of Chicago, specializing in Song dynasty history. He was president of the American Oriental Society in 1972–73.

His father-in-law was the idealist philosopher William Ernest Hocking.

== Education and career ==
Edward A. Kracke Jr. was born in Brooklyn, N.Y. and raised largely in Chicago and Europe. He attended Harvard University where he received three academic degrees: B.A. in 1932, M.A. in 1935, and Ph.D. in 1941. His undergraduate degree was in architecture and the fine arts, but a course under Langdon Warner ignited his interest in China. With an M.A. under his belt, he studied Chinese and Central Asian history under Étienne Balazs at l'École nationale des langues orientales vivantes in Paris, France, in 1935–36. From 1936 to 1940 he studied Chinese language and history at Yenching University in Beiping (Beijing), China, where he associated with William Hung. Subsequently, he returned to Harvard, working with Edwin O. Reischauer, John K. Fairbank and Serge Elisséeff and completing a post-doctoral fellowship in Japanese language.

During World War II, Kracke worked as an intelligence officer at the Far East Division, Research and Analysis Branch of the Office of Strategic Services in Washington, D.C. From January 1944 to October 1945 he headed the Japanese Political Section, producing reports on political conditions in Japan, Formosa (Taiwan), and Korea. In 1946 he transferred to the U.S. Department of State's Division of Far East Intelligence, where he stayed for less than six months before resigning to devote himself to scholarly pursuits.

In 1946, Kracke went as a visiting professor to the University of Chicago, where he would remain until retiring in 1973. In 1953 he published a monograph titled Civil Service in Early Sung China, a pioneering study of the Song (Sung) society and institutions based on his dissertation. From 1954 to 1957, he served as director of the Far Eastern Association (now Association for Asian Studies), from 1957 to 1963, Chairman of the Committee on Far Eastern Civilizations, from 1970 to 1971, Chairman of the Committee on Far Eastern Studies, and from 1972 to 1973, president of the American Oriental Society. He also served as the Director of the Center for Far Eastern Studies from 1961 to 1964 and again in 1971–1972.
