= The Cambridge History of Inner Asia =

- Author: Denis Sinor (Edited the 1st vol.); Nicola Di Cosmo, Allen J. Frank and Peter B. Golden (Edited the 2nd vol.)
- Country: United Kingdom
- Language: English
- Genre: Asian history
- Publisher: Cambridge University Press
- Published: 1987 onwards
- No. of books: 3 (2 published)

The Cambridge History of Inner Asia is an ongoing series of history books published by Cambridge University Press (CUP) covering the early and modern history of Inner Asian and Central Asian peoples.

The first volume titled "The Cambridge History of Early Inner Asia" was edited by Denis Sinor, a Distinguished Professor Emeritus of Central Asian Studies at the Department of Central Eurasian Studies at Indiana University in 1987 and published in 1990. This volume introduces the geographical setting of Central Asia and follows its history from the palaeolithic era to the rise of the Mongol Empire in the thirteenth century.

The series' second volume, The Cambridge History of Inner Asia: The Chinggisid Age, was published in 2009. Similar to the previous volume, a large group of international experts contributed to each chapter. This volume centres on the history and legacy of the Mongol World Empire founded by Genghis Khan and its successor states, including its impact upon the modern world.

The Cambridge History of Inner Asia: The Modern Age is set to be released in the near future.

== Contents ==
The volumes of the series are as follows:

1. Early Inner Asia (edited by Denis Sinor), (March 30, 1990). ISBN 978-0521243049.
2. The Chinggisid Age (edited by Nicola Di Cosmo, Allen J. Frank and Peter B. Golden), September 28, 2009. ISBN 978-0521849265
3. The Modern Age (edited by Annette Bohr and Edmund Herzig), forthcoming.

== See also ==
- The Cambridge History of China, especially volume 6, Alien Regimes and Border States, 907–1368
- Cambridge University
- History of Kazakhstan
- History of Kyrgyzstan
- History of Tajikistan
- History of Uzbekistan
- History of Afghanistan
