= The Cambridge History of China =

Book set

- Author: John King Fairbank, Denis Twitchett (eds.)
- Country: United Kingdom
- Language: English
- Genre: Chinese history
- Publisher: Cambridge University Press
- Published: 1978–2020
- No. of books: 18 (17 published) including the Cambridge History of Ancient China

The Cambridge History of China is a series of books published by the Cambridge University Press (CUP) covering the history of China from the founding of the Qin dynasty in 221 BC to 1982 AD. The series was conceived by British historian Denis Twitchett and American historian John King Fairbank in the late 1960s, and publication began in 1978. The complete History will contain 15 volumes made up of 17 books (not including the Cambridge History of Ancient China) with volumes 5 and 9 consisting of two books each.

Chinese history before the Qin dynasty is covered in an independent volume, The Cambridge History of Ancient China (1999) which follows the Pinyin romanization system; the other volumes except vol. 2 use Wade–Giles romanization. The final volume, Volume 4, was to be published in 2020, but is indefinitely delayed. An unauthorized Chinese translation of volume 7 (The Ming Dynasty, 1368–1644, Part 1) was made in 1992 by the Chinese Academy of Social Sciences. In this version, the map of the Ming empire in the original was replaced by a more extensive map from The Historical Atlas of China, while the other maps were used unchanged.

== Volumes ==
The volumes of the series are as follows:

1. The Ch'in and Han Empires, 221 BC–AD 220 (edited by Denis Twitchett and Michael Loewe), December 1986. ISBN 978-0-521-24327-8.
2. The Six Dynasties, 220–589 (edited by Albert E. Dien and Keith N. Knapp), 7 November 2019. ISBN 978-1-107-02077-1.
3. Sui and T'ang China, 589–906 AD, Part 1 (edited by Twitchett), September 1979. ISBN 978-0-521-21446-9. This volume covers the political history of the Sui and Tang dynasties.
4. Sui and T'ang China, 589–906 AD, Part 2 (edited by Twitchett), [Still unpublished] ISBN 978-0-521-24329-2. This volume is intended to cover cultural and economic topics related to the Sui and Tang dynasties.
5. The Sung Dynasty and its Precursors, 907–1279, Part 1 (edited by Twitchett and Paul Jakov Smith), March 2009. ISBN 978-0-521-81248-1. This part covers the political history of the Five Dynasties and Ten Kingdoms and the Song dynasty.
  - Sung China, 960–1279 AD, Part 2 (edited by John W. Chaffee and Twitchett), March 2015. ISBN 978-0-521-24330-8. This part covers government, economy, law, education, society, and philosophy of the Song dynasty.
6. Alien Regimes and Border States, 907–1368 (edited by Twitchett and Herbert Franke), November 1994. ISBN 978-0-521-24331-5. This volume covers the Khitan Liao dynasty, the Jurchen Jin dynasty, the Tangut Western Xia dynasty, and the Mongol Yuan dynasty.
7. The Ming Dynasty, 1368–1644, Part 1 (edited by Frederick W. Mote and Twitchett), February 1988. ISBN 978-0-521-24332-2. This volume covers the political history of the Ming dynasty.
8. The Ming Dynasty, 1368–1644, Part 2 (edited by Twitchett and Mote), January 1998. ISBN 978-0-521-24333-9. This volume covers government, law, foreign relations, economy, culture, and religion of the Ming dynasty.
9. The Ch'ing Empire to 1800, Part 1 (edited by Willard J. Peterson), December 2002. ISBN 978-0-521-24334-6. This part covers the Manchu conquest of China, and the political history and society of the Qing dynasty from Nurhaci to the Qianlong Emperor.
  - The Ch'ing Dynasty to 1800, Part 2 (edited by Peterson) April 2016. ISBN 978-0-521-24335-3. This part covers early Qing conquests (Taiwan, Mongolia, Xinjiang, and Tibet) and international relations (Korea, Vietnam, Japan, and maritime Europeans), as well as provincial governance, learning, Taoism, and local elites in the early Qing.
10. Late Ch'ing 1800–1911, Part 1 (edited by John K. Fairbank), June 1978. ISBN 978-0-521-21447-6. This volume covers the political history of the last 111 years of Manchu rule over China. online
11. Late Ch'ing 1800–1911, Part 2 (edited by Fairbank and Kwang-Ching Liu), September 1980. ISBN 978-0-521-22029-3. This volume covers the economy, foreign relations, political and social changes, and the revolution movement of the late Qing.
12. Republican China, 1912–1949, Part 1 (edited by Fairbank and Twitchett), September 1983. ISBN 978-0-521-23541-9.
13. Republican China, 1912–1949, Part 2 (edited by Fairbank and Albert Feuerwerker), July 1986. ISBN 978-0-521-24338-4.
14. The People's Republic, Part 1: Emergence of Revolutionary China, 1949–1965 (edited by Roderick MacFarquhar and Fairbank), June 1987. ISBN 978-0-521-24336-0.
15. The People's Republic, Part 2: Revolutions Within the Chinese Revolution, 1966–1982 (edited by MacFarquhar and Fairbank), November 1991. ISBN 978-0-521-24337-7.

=== The Cambridge History of Ancient China ===
The Cambridge History of Ancient China: From the Origins of Civilization to 221 BC edited by Michael Loewe and Edward L. Shaughnessy was published in 1999 (ISBN 978-0-521-47030-8). This book provides a survey of the institutional and cultural history of China up to the unification of China by Qin Shi Huang in 221 BC. Fourteen specialists on early Chinese history including Robert Bagley, Kwang-chih Chang, Cho-yun Hsu, David Keightley, Mark Edward Lewis, David S. Nivison, and Jessica Rawson contributed to the book.

== Reviews ==
- Crossley, Pamela Kyle (2018). "In the Parlor with the Cambridge History of China". Harvard Journal of Asiatic Studies. 78 (2): 477–490. doi:10.1353/jas.2018.0030. S2CID 195385765.
- Ebrey, Patricia (2017). "The Cambridge History of China, Volume 5, Part 2: Sung China, 960–1279 Ed. By John W. Chaffee, Denis Twitchett (Review)". Harvard Journal of Asiatic Studies. 77 (1): 175–183. doi:10.1353/jas.2017.0012. S2CID 164729566.
- Elliott, Mark (1996). "The Cambridge History of China, Vol. 6. Alien Regimes and Border States, 907-1368. by Herbert Franke, Denis Twitchett". The Journal of Asian Studies. 55 (1): 146–149. doi:10.2307/2943656. JSTOR 2943656. S2CID 161702547.
- Fogel, Joshua A. (1988). "The Cambridge History of China. Vol. 13: Republican China, 1912–1949, Part 2. Edited by John K. Fairbank and Albert Feuerwerker. Cambridge: Cambridge University Press, 1986. Xix, 1092". The Journal of Asian Studies. 47 (2): 342–345. doi:10.2307/2056188. JSTOR 2056188. S2CID 161461956.
- Gittings, John (1993). "Understanding Revolutionary China: 'The Cambridge History of China', Vols. Xiv and Xv, Edited by Roderick Macfarquhar and John K. Fairbank". The China Quarterly (London). 133: 152. doi:10.1017/S0305741000018233. S2CID 154276661.
- Hansen, Valerie (2010). "The Age of Confucian Rule: The Song Transformation of China, And: The Cambridge History of China, Volume 5 Part One: The Sung Dynasty and Its Precursors, 907–1279 (Review)". Journal of Song-Yuan Studies. 40 (1): 131–140. doi:10.1353/sys.2011.0005. S2CID 161816743.
- Metzger, Thomas A. (1980). "The Cambridge History of China Volume 10 Pt 1 Late Ch'ing". Pacific Affairs. 53 (1): 124–127. doi:10.2307/2756967. JSTOR 2756967. S2CID 158899948.

== See also ==
- Cambridge University
- The Cambridge History of Inner Asia, covering some of the conquest dynasties and Tibet
- The Cambridge Illustrated History of China
- The Cambridge History of Chinese Literature
- The Cambridge Economic History of China
- Science and Civilisation in China
