= John W. Chaffee =

American historian of China

- Born: 1948 (age 77–78); Anhui, Republic of China

Academic background
- Education: University of Chicago (PhD)
- Doctoral advisor: Edward A. Kracke Jr.

Academic work
- Discipline: Chinese history
- Institutions: Binghamton University

Chinese name
- Traditional Chinese: 賈志揚
- Simplified Chinese: 贾志扬
Transcriptions
Standard Mandarin
- Hanyu Pinyin: Jiǎ Zhìyáng

John William Chaffee (born 1948) is an American sinologist and historian specializing in the history of China, particularly the Song dynasty. He is currently Distinguished Service Professor Emeritus of History and Asian and Asian American Studies at Binghamton University.

== Books ==
- The Thorny Gates of Learning in Sung China: A Social History of Examinations. Cambridge University Press. 1995.

Chinese translation: 宋代科舉. San Min Book Company. 1995. ISBN 9789571917467.
Korean translation: 송대 중국인의 과거생활. Translated by Yang Chong-guk. Sinseowon. 2001. ISBN 9788979405347.

- The Branches of Heaven: A History of the Sung Imperial Clan. Harvard University Press. 1999.

Chinese translation: 天潢貴胄：宋代宗室史. Translated by Zhao Dongmei. Jiangsu People's Publishing House. 2006. ISBN 9787214040978..

- The Muslim Merchants of Premodern China: The Social History of a Trade Diaspora, 700-1400. Cambridge University Press. 2018.

He also edited one volume of The Cambridge History of China (with Denis Twitchett).
