= List of Ikki Tousen characters =

The anime and manga series Ikki Tousen features a wide and diverse cast of characters created by Yūji Shiozaki. The characters as well as their names are loosely based upon the characters from the Chinese novel Romance of the Three Kingdoms. For example, the character Hakufu Sonsaku is based on the historical figure Sun Ce (Sonsaku being the Japanese name for Sun Ce, Hakufu being the Japanese pronunciation for his courtesy name Bofu). The series revolves around Hakufu Sonsaku, a female fighter who attends Nanyo Academy with her male cousin Koukin Shuyu, where seven rival schools fight each other for supremacy in the Kanto region.

== Main schools ==
=== Nanyo Academy ===
Nanyo Academy (南陽學院, Nanyō Gakuen) is a school named after Nanyang, which based on the Wu Kingdom in the Three Kingdoms period. The top-ranked fighters in Nanyo are known as the Big Four (南陽四天王, Nanyō Shiten'ō), which consists of Shimei Ryomou, Gakushuu, Kouha Kannei, and Genpou Saji. After Kannei's defeat, Koukin Shuuyu becomes one of the Big Four in his place.

Hakufu Sonsaku (孫策 伯符, Sonsaku Hakufu)
Voiced by: Masumi Asano (Japanese); Carrie Savage (Seasons 1, 3-4), Debora Rabbai (Season 2) (English)
The protagonist of Ikki Tousen. A second-year transfer student at Nanyo, she is not terribly bright, but is immeasurably powerful despite being only a D-ranked fighter. Because of her busty physique and high skill, she is known by others as the Busty Fighter (爆乳闘士, Bakunyū Tōshi), and is also known by her predecessor's title, the Sho Haou (小霸王, Shō Haō; "Little Conqueror"), due to her fate of conquering all of the rival schools. Hakufu cares little for the politics involved between the fighters, only caring about fighting for the sake of fighting, but is staunchly against unnecessary violence and killing. Lately, however, with trouble brewing all around her, she is beginning to take up the mantle of a leader to protect her friends and family.

Hakufu possesses a unique gift for predicting an enemy's moves very accurately by reading the flow of chi around her opponents, which occasionally makes her seem brighter than she is. For instance, she will put an end to a fight simply by stating the next moves of an opponent with frightening accuracy, breaking his will to fight after he realizes the futility of fighting her. She is also very good at "delayed striking", where she makes a feint attack in order to leave an invisible "chi bomb" which detonates moments later while the enemy's guard is down. She is skilled at "inner striking," which is another chi attack where she sends her chi into a person, causing damage to manifest at unusual places. She also inherited Master Chosho's knowledge of chi magic, and, while currently unaware of this, is able to use it partially by instinct. Chosho passed it to her spiritually while Hakufu was unconscious; this is how she healed Koukin after she stabbed him; she slept with Koukin and extracted the evil chi from his body into her own (an uncommon method). She still has the evil chi contained inside her, and it appears on her body as a skull-like mark and is slowly creeping up to her heart.

Hakufu harbors a powerful dragon as one of the Three Great Rulers (the founders of the Three Kingdoms, along with Sousou and Ryubi). Before joining Nanyo, Hakufu lived with her mother, Goei, outside of Kanto where she, like the samurai, practiced things like flower arrangement and the tea ceremony while training heavily in martial arts. Goei was hoping to spare Hakufu her fate, but after Hakufu pummeled a traveling fighter looking for easy prey, they moved in with Koukin. She is very girlish and happy-go-lucky but is capable of wisdom despite having very bad luck. For instance, in one scene where she is just about to deliver a finishing blow to Kannei, her panties get caught on a branch, tripping her over. Nanyo has officially declared Hakufu to be their ruler. She learned the Water Dragon Fist attack from Choukou with the help of Rikuson and Saji, but has apparently killed Saji who was under the guise of Ouin. After Saji's death, she has become more "leader-like", though her airheaded nature still shows.

Hakufu's anime incarnation portrays her as a low ranked and low skilled fighter, and has demonstrated none of her unique fighting gifts or chi powers and is arguably more stupid. In addition to her stupidity, she is more prone to doing dumber things, and either does not mind or is unaware of people harassing or hitting on her. She relies heavily on her dragon or her personal skill alone, and even when possessed by her dragon, she is easily stopped by the other main characters she fights before any damage can be dealt, as opposed to her manga counterpart which is extremely difficult to stop and required the aid of artifacts. She also does not inherit Master Chosho's chi magic (who does not exist in the anime); instead, she undergoes training with Ukitsu's master Chokou. She is possessed by Totaku at the end of the first season but is saved by her dragon who devours him.

In Ikki Tousen: Dragon Destiny, her role is reduced to a minor character, but became a major player in the Battle of Red Cliffs. She was not portrayed to be as idiotic as the first season, and is actually more of a ditzy character than an idiot. Upset at being the cause for much of the violence in Kanto, she traveled to Kyosho to challenge Sousou to a duel in order to end the conflict. She had to take on Kanu instead, who took Sousou's place, and during the fight, Hakufu became possessed by her dragon. Sousou appeared while in full control of his own dragon and dealt a powerful blow that sent Hakufu flying out of the area, leaving all three schools to think she was killed. Her unconscious body was discovered in a lake by Hakugen, who brings her to Chokou. He performed a revival on Hakufu's body but was only able to wake her dragon. Ukitsu gave her life in order to revive Hakufu's soul. Hakufu thus recovered and gained complete control of her dragon. She returned at the Battle of Chibi to fight Sousou, where she and Ryuubi teamed up and defeated Sousou. At the end of the series, Hakufu and Ryomou now work at a cosplay cafe, dressed as cat maids, and hopes to use the money to go on a "battle tour" around the world. She returns as a main character in Great Guardians, and is able to resist Genpou Saji's (the "real" Saji) genjutsu.

Shimei Ryomou (呂蒙 子明, Ryomō Shimei)
Voiced by: Yūko Kaida (Japanese); Tricia Dickson (Seasons 1, 3-4), Rebecca Soler (Season 2) (English)
Ryomou is a third-year student at Nanyo Academy. She is an odd girl with short blue hair and green eyes, a distinctive beauty mark on her left cheek, and a very strange history, mainly tied to her mysterious left-eye patch, and is always seen wearing fingerless gloves and combat boots. Powerful and a B-rank, she is also one of Nanyo's Big Four. She has a habit of wearing a blue miniskirted French maid outfit, and specializes in submission wrestling moves, throws, and joint attacks which she uses in conjunction with a pair of handcuffs she carries, and is also very proficient in making chi blasts. Her earlier life before she became a fighter is unknown, but is hinted as being tragic and painful. She, Teifu, and Saji have been best friends long before the start of the series, and Ryomou is in love with Saji and cares for Teifu (who loves her). Ryomou has always fought for the fun of it, and considers herself no one's woman. Presumably because of her dragon, she has a minor split personality; one is fairly shy and normal and the other is psychosexual. Her psycho side is not nearly as bad as Ryubi, Sousou and Hakufu.

Three years prior to the start of the series, Ryomou fought Ryuubi when her dragon had awakened, and saved her life right before Ryuubi attempted to rip her own heart out. In the process, Ryuubi's dragon possessed Ryomou's left eye, and now perfectly coexists with her. Its power even healed her completely after being mortally wounded and stabbed through the heart by Teni. No other characters seem to be in harmony with their dragons as much as Ryomou, but she still seals it with her eye-patch and is believed to be dying because of it. Very few are aware of this, and it is not stated whether she shares Ryuubi's dragon or now has her own. While she has it, she is as powerful as the other Three Rulers. Her magical eye may be a reference to the Chinese idiom "To look at a person with a new eye," or reevaluate them or not to judge them by their appearance, an idiom attributed to Lu Meng who was as brilliant a scholar as he was a warrior.

In the anime series, Ryomou is much more taciturn and serious than her manga counterpart to the point of being almost unemotional, and is not shy or spoony and acts uninterested in relationships (in one scene, she is not even phased when Saji puts his hand down her shirt and gropes her). Her magatama is also shown as being silver in the first season, and by the second season she is arguably as strong as Kakouen, though she retreats during their first battle in order to protect the Dragon Jade. She does not have a past relationship to Seito and Ryuubi either, instead her dragon appears to be her own, though how she got it remains unknown. She also appears to be closer to Hakufu than she does in the manga, and goes out of her way to help the Nanyo leader whenever she can; in Dragon Destiny, she even went out on her own to find the Dragon Jade to save Hakufu. She was badly injured after being ambushed by Teni until Chouun came to her rescue, but Ryomou awakened her own dragon, defeating Teni. Choun was able to knock out Ryomou, bandage her, and return her to Nanyo after stealing the Dragon Jade. Choun stated that if Ryomou had not been injured during the awakening of her dragon, Ryomou might have been able to defeat her. Ryomou recovered to full strength and played a part in the Battle of Red Cliffs, defeating Kakouen. She is now working along with Hakufu in a cosplay cafe, dressed as a cat-eared maid and wearing a heart-shaped eye-patch, though she and Hakufu lost that job and numerous others in Great Guardians because of Ryomou's clumsiness and beating on customers. Ryomou's dragon, unlike Hakufu's, did not go back into hibernation after Red Cliffs, and it is revealed to be killing her.

Koukin Shuyu (周瑜 公瑾, Shūyu Kōkin)
Voiced by: Satoshi Hino (Japanese); Ted Sroka (Seasons 1, 3-4), Ted Lewis (Season 2) (English)
Hakufu's rich cousin and a second-year student at Nanyo Academy. He is an attractive pretty boy, as both Kanu (Tokyopop translation only) and Ukitsu have expressed exclusive interest in him (this trait was toned down in the anime). Although only a C-ranked fighter, his lack of confidence and his short resume of victories (or battles for that matter) keep him from becoming A-ranked despite already having the power of one. He has a crush on his cousin Hakufu and is generally shy and well-meaning, making life very difficult for him. Oddly, Hakufu does not seem to mind being naked around him, which shows how much she is really connected with him, but at times she thinks he is a pervert whenever he is caught in an embarrassing situation (such as Hakufu catching him staring at her things). He is now one of Nanyo's Big Four, taking Kannei's place after he was defeated.

Koukin has demonstrated some great power when he defended Hakufu and Kakouton from the Ugan gang, which astonished even Kakouton. He stayed behind to fight and eventually was captured, allowing the other two to escape. While being held captive in Kyosho, he was seduced by three beautiful girls (one of them being Seito's spy, Shokan, who reveals her identity to him afterwards) in an attempt to make Koukin betray Nanyo and fight for Sousou. This is, in fact, part of the plan for the Battle of Red Cliffs; with Koukin personally enacting "the plan of bodily harm." Once the Kyosho forces are scattered in the battle he breaks free, easily defeating Kaku and Gakushin. He is currently trying to locate the separated Nanyo and Seito forces in order to take command, as per his fate in the battle.

In the anime, he is the only character whose after-episode biography in the first season poked fun at him, saying that after he became lost in a forest, Hakufu nicknamed him "The Lost Koukin", and as a child, he was called "Crybaby Koukin" by other children because he always cried when others bullied him, and Hakufu was usually there to protect him from bullies. Koukin was unable to stop Hakufu's dragon when she fought Ukitsu; instead he was almost fatally pummeled in the attempt only to have Hakufu stop her dragon on her own. In Dragon Destiny, after hearing of Hakufu's supposed demise, he blames Koumei for manipulating the events that led to Hakufu's fight with Sousou. However, Kanu proved to him that it was Hakufu's choice to challenge Sousou, and her fight with Kanu was one out of respect as fighters and not out of hatred. This led to Nanyo and Seito forming an alliance to face Kyosho. He returns to being a student after the Battle of Red Cliffs.

Genpou Saji (左慈 元放, Saji Genpō) / Shishi Ouin (王允 子师, Ōin Shishi)
Voiced by: Showtaro Morikubo (Season 1), Kōji Yusa (Season 2–onwards) (Japanese); Justin Gross (Season 1), Wayne Grayson (Season 2), Liam O'Brien (Seasons 3-4) (English)
A third-year student at Nanyo Academy with blond hair and a light tan, and one of Nanyo's Big Four. He is one of Ryomou's oldest friends (whom he refers to as "Mou-chan"), and has feelings for both her and Housen Ryofu; even so, he is also a complete womanizer. His actual ranking as a fighter is unknown, as he never actually wears his magatama in public, but in fights he has shown himself to be an A-rank easily. One of his primary goals as Ouin was to remove Totaku from power, which, like his historical namesake, he accomplishes by convincing Ryofu to assassinate him.

In order to further Hakufu's mastery of the Water Dragon Fist, Saji fully donned the magatama and identity of Ouin, granting him great power and also slightly altering his appearance. Engaging Hakufu in deadly combat, he intentionally awakens her dragon, then, using his experience with Ryuubi's dragon three years ago, absorbs the dragon's negative energy into himself, snapping Hakufu back to normal and placing the dragon's power completely under her control, though at the cost of losing one of his arms in the process. Infected with the dragon's evil and knowing he does not have much time left, he declares that he is no longer Saji but Ouin, and that he has already lived longer than he should have. Telling Hakufu not to cry for someone like him, he commits suicide by jumping off a nearby cliff in a manner eerily similar to Totaku's death, his last thoughts of Ryofu. At the same time, even though she was far away, Ryomou is suddenly struck with the knowledge that Saji would not be coming back.

In the anime adaptation, he is more sinister, even going so far as to have Kannei murder Enjutsu in order to take control of Nanyo for himself, the act of which driving Kannei insane. He has the power to hypnotize and control the minds of humans, treating them more like pawns than friends. He is more obsessed with Totaku's demise, and tried to take control of Hakufu as well, but failed when Totaku tried to possess her and was eaten by her dragon. He resolves to atone afterwards, and has secluded himself in the mountains somewhere. He reappears in Dragon Destiny in order to stop Koukin from traveling to Kyosho to stop Hakufu from fighting Kanu. When he returns, he immediately goes back to his womanizing ways, flirting with Ryomou, Ryuubi, Chouhi, and Bashoku at separate points in the anime. He and Ryomou defeat Myousai at the Battle of Red Cliffs, and returns to his womanising ways again at the end of the series.

It is revealed in Great Guardians that there really is another fighter who goes by the name of Genpou Saji, revealing that Saji's name was actually not an alias. The real Saji meets with him and in exchange for reviving Ryofu, wanted to obtain Ryomou's dragon by putting on a lover's "act" for Ryomou, in order to build up her jealous emotions so that her dragon would be released. Ouin, for the most part, went with the plan. However, it was to save not only Ryomou and Ryofu but Saji himself as well.

Gakushu (樂就, Gakushū)
Voiced by: Hajime Iijima (Japanese); Ivan Buckley (Seasons 1, 3-4), Bill Rogers (Season 2) (English)
Called "Gaku-chan" by Hakufu, he is a third-year student at Nanyo Academy, a B-ranked fighter, and one of the Big Four. A large, muscular man with a scary face but a very nice personality, he is man of honor to the very core, and prides himself in this and in his rippling muscles, but usually gets beaten by all but the weakest of opponents. He learned how to use chi blasts after Ryomou blasted him through a wall without even twitching. Despite his strength and training, his skill is far poorer than that of Ryomou and Ryofu's, as shown when he blasted Kakouen who still got up afterwards. Though he is helping Nanyo with their alliance with Seito, he is pessimistic about their chances, such as when he commented the plan of bodily harm could not work since Kogai had been killed earlier. He later assists along with Saji and Rikuson to test Hakufu's worth as leader of Nanyo, and has no serious involvement since then.

Gakushuu plays a slightly more important role in the anime than in the manga, serving as a sort of de facto commander when Enjutsu and Saji go silent. He even investigates Enjutsu's odd behavior, and is the first to find out he is dead but is captured by Kannei. He is beaten even more than in the manga, only to miraculously recover an episode later. He is also shown to have a sweet tooth, and even holds a meeting with Koukin in an ice cream shop. In Dragon Destiny, he becomes a lot tougher and was able to have an even fight with Kakouen. At the end of the series he gets a job in a store, but risks getting fired for throwing a customer through a window when he would not stop harassing a woman.

Tokubou Teifu (程普 德謀, Teifu Tokubō)
Voiced by: Makoto Endo (Japanese); Jonas Ball (English)
A long-time friend of Saji and Ryomou. He was once a strong fighter and was well respected by others. He often bullied Enjutsu even though it was Enjutsu who was the leader of Nanyo at the time. He has had feelings for Ryomou for as long as they knew each other. Enjutsu retaliated when he and Kaku tricked Teifu into awakening Ryuubi's dragon, and led Teifu to believe Ryomou would be raped if Teifu would not obey him.

A few years later, Teifu was chosen to be one of Nanyo's representatives for the Grest Fighters Tournament, and suffered a horrible beating in a match that left him in a coma. He would have been killed if Ryomou had not interfered in the match, causing him to be disqualified. Teifu recovered from his coma but is now blind and nowhere near fully recovered. Teifu still jokes about blaming Ryomou for getting him disqualified. When Ryomou is left doubting her abilities after losing to Hakufu, Teifu offers her some much needed encouragement. In the anime, Teifu keeps his injuries and also his feelings for Ryomou. However, he does not appear at all in Dragon Destiny, which is where Ryomou discovered her own dragon.

Hakugen Rikuson (陸遜 伯言, Rikuson Hakugen)
Voiced by: Mikako Takahashi (Japanese); Erika Weinstein (English)
A cute, bespectacled junior at Nanyo Academy who is skilled in making poisons. She has recently joined the Nanyo gang with the intention of helping them beat Sousou. According to Lu Xun's history (both in the manga and from other sources), Lu Xun is sometimes credited with the defeat of Guan Yu, not Lu Meng. The manga states that Rikuson defeated Kanu and Ryuubi per Ryomou's orders, but history books variably give full credit to either Lu Meng or Lu Xun for coming up with the plan that led to the defeat of Guan Yu's forces (although in any case both are very important to this victory). History also states that Rikuson was Ryomou's protégé and eventual successor. Rikuson refers to Ryomou as her big sister in the English translation, although it is not confirmed if they are related. She is currently trying to help the Nanyo/Seito alliance during the Sekiheki battle, but also is slightly panicked due to the forces being separated and not in communication.

In Dragon Destiny, although she is still a student in Nanyo, Hakugen is only seen with Ukitsu and Chokou in the anime, where it is revealed she was also trained by the latter. She was also the person who found Hakufu unconscious in a river after her battle with Sousou. She visits Ukitsu's grave with Chokou at the end of the series, and now helps Chokou train young fighters.

Shokyo (小喬, Shōkyō) / Chuubo Sonken (孫権 仲謀, Sonken Chūbō)
Voiced by: Yui Horie, Ayaka Ohashi (New Ikki Tousen) (Japanese); Lauren Landa (English)
Anime-exclusive character
An anime-exclusive character who appears in Great Guardians. She is introduced as the younger sister of Hakufu under the name of Chuubo Sonken, but later tells them that her name is in fact Shokyo. She often quotes military strategist Sun Tzu. It is implied that she might have feelings for Koukin, as she is his "destined wife." Unlike her sister Hakufu, Shokyo is very polite, shy, gentle, and is very skilled at cooking. It is also pointed out by many characters in the series that Shokyo does not look like her sister at all. She confesses her feelings for Koukin, but he turns her down gently and tells her to not let destiny rule her life. She accepts that very gracefully, also deducing Koukin's love for Hakufu. She joins Hakufu's fight with the real Saji, whom she bravely speaks to and helps get over her problems and traumas.

Kouro Enjutsu (袁術 公路, Enjutsu Kōro)
The former leader of Nanyo and once Totaku's lapdog, a complete weakling at that. Kakouen mutilated his face when she attacked Nanyo looking for the Gyokuji. He played a role in Ryubi's first awakening of her dragon three years before the start of the series. Kaku offered to help Enjutsu get revenge on Teifu for pushing him around, and staged a phony video of Enjutsu's henchmen about to rape Ryomou (Kaku in disguise) and showed it to Teifu, threatening they would go ahead with the rape if he would not obey Enjutsu. When Teifu fell for the trick, Enjutsu sent him to assault Seito and attack Ryubi, eventually leading to her dragon awakening. He is currently presumed dead. In the anime, he is killed by Kannei under Ouin's orders prior to the series' start, driving Kannei insane, and only his withered corpse is seen.

Kouha Kannei (甘寧 興霸, Kannei Kōha)
Voiced by: Yūji Ueda (Japanese); Taliesin Jaffe (English)
One of Nanyo Academy's Big Four. A pervert and a highly dishonorable fighter, he specializes in using a pair of tonfas with hidden blades. Myosai used a pressure point move on him that would kill him in ten days, and promised to remove the effect if Kannei would kill Hakufu but has failed to do this so far. He interrupts the Seito group's attack during the battle, having been possessed by Ryofu's magatama. He shows none of her personality, but has her vicious will to fight. He is finally stopped by Taishiji.

In the anime adaptation, he is crazier than his manga counterpart, and can be best described as a deranged chimpanzee. Ouin drives him insane by making him kill Enjutsu prior to the start of the series. He then hypnotizes Kannei into believing Enjutsu is still alive, and gives him orders which he suicidally follows. He is confined to an asylum at the end of the first season where he still remains. However, after Bashoku's framing of Kannei for the death of Kakuka in Dragon Destiny, he mysteriously vanished from this confinement, which led Koukin and Gakushuu into suspecting Seito may have been involved.

Shikei Roshuku (魯肅 子敬, Roshuku Shikei)
Voiced by: Sanae Kobayashi
A student from Nanyo wearing many bandages, her injuries never explained. She first appears in the manga among the Nanyo gang to announce that Kanu has been captured by Sousou, and comes up with a plan involving Nanyo and Seito to team up and launch a surprise attack on Koushou. She does not appear in the anime adaptation, so far, though she makes a brief cameo in the last episode of the Dragon Destiny OVA and also is seen as a background character in the fourth Xtreme Xcuters OVA.

Shiyu Shokatsukin (諸葛瑾 子瑜, Shokatsukin Shiyu)
A student at Nanyo who appears in the last chapters of volume 13, when Hakugen calls her to help Hakufu to wake up from her unconsciousness. She is last seen in an animal-carehouse.

Shisonzui (士孫瑞)
Voiced by: Akihiko Ishizumi (Japanese); Michael McConnohie (English)
The retainer of the Ou Family. In the anime, he is seen in a flashback when Ouin decided to disguise himself as Genpou Saji. Ouin told him that how he escaped the fate (in the novel, after Dong Zhuo's death, Wang Yun and Shisun Rui are killed by his followers Li Jue and Guo Si).

En'in (袁胤, En'in)
Voiced by: Daisuke Kishio (Japanese); Todd Haberkorn (English)
The leader of a perverted sect within Nanyo who had watched the girls come to and from Nanyo everyday, noting from their crude observation of Chubou's breast size and comparing those to Hakufu's. He and his gang appear in a single episode of Great Guardians where they abduct Chubou to lure Hakufu out and take pictures of her. However, when he tries to rape her, he is defeated by Hakufu and her friends. In his backstory, he planned to succeed Enjutsu.

=== Kyosho Academy ===
Kyosho Academy (許昌學院, Kyoshō Gakuin) is a school named after Xuchang, which based on the Wei Kingdom of the Three Kingdoms period. Its leader is Moutoku Sousou.

Moutoku Sousou (曹操 孟德, Sōsō Mōtoku)
Voiced by: Susumu Akagi (Japanese); Greg Weisman (Seasons 1, 3-4), Dan Green (Season 2) (English)
The eccentric leader of Kyosho Academy, best friend to Genjou and Houkou, and a B-ranked fighter. Until his dragon awoke, he did not care much for the state of affairs, but afterward he became extremely violent, blood-thirsty, and power-mad because due to the dragon's influence. However, he is more interested in controlling powerful fighters than getting precious artifacts such as the Gyokuji and the Hyakuhekito. When Kanu refused to be freed in return for Ryubi surrendering the Gyokuji, Sousou happily accepts Kanu's request and orders the Gyokuji to be returned. Sousou often criticizes Kaku for wearing glasses, telling her she looks cuter without them. Easily the strongest character at the moment. He also has strange dreams involving an old man with writing on his forehead asking Sousou to avenge him. Despite Shibai's plan to keep him away from the Battle of Red Cliffs no matter what, his dragon pulls him forcibly towards the battle, as his dragon strongly desires to combat Ryubi and Sonsaku.

In the anime, he is less sinister a character, and instead seems more like a disturbed and troubled man trying to fight his dragon. He is much calmer and more caring until his dragon awoke. When Kanu was captured and taken prisoner, Sousou broke her out and persuaded her to join him. Kanu proved herself by fighting Hakufu one-on-one. Sousou was watching the fight on top of a nearby building and when Hakufu spotted him, she charged at him using the power of her dragon. Sousou countered with his own dragon and blew Hakufu a great distance away. While in his dragon state he almost killed his best friend, Kakouton. He was chained to a wall while being watched over by Chukou to prevent him from killing anyone else. In the Battle of Red Cliffs, he merged with Shibai's evil powers and he attempts to kill Ryuubi. He was defeated, and presumably killed, by Hakufu and Ryubi. In an episode of Great Guardians, Sousou is revealed to be alive, appearing out of nowhere behind Kakouen. After seeing him, Kakouen breaks into tears and Sousou comforts her, perhaps showing that he really does treasure Kakouen.

Genjou Kakouton (夏侯惇 元讓, Kakōton Genjō)
Voiced by: Yūji Ueda (Season 1), Shūhei Sakaguchi (Season 2–onwards) (Japanese); Josh Phillips (Seasons 1, 3-4), Tom Wayland (Season 2) (English)
A fighter known for his love of using only the most basic moves in combat, abhorring (and perhaps being incapable of) any other kind of combat. An honorable but eccentric young man, and currently studying civil engineering, he goes to great lengths to repair the damage done to any place he fights, patching walls and pavement and believing such a place to be a dojo he must maintain. He is a very good friend of both Sousou and Kakuka and has a crush on Hakufu, who is on very good terms with him. Like his predecessor, Kakouton had his left eye gouged out this time by a kunai-wielding assassin (Xiahou lost his eye to an archer), trying to defend Sousou before his dragon awakened. He is affectionately referred to as "Ton-chan" (惇ちゃん) by Hakufu.

In the first anime season, Goei told him how to beat Hakufu during the Great Fighter's Tournament, and helped him by distracting her daughter while Kakouton injured her legs. Goei also flirted with him continually, leading most of the fighters to conclude that he likes mature women, a belief he vehemently denies to no avail. He still likes Hakufu, who is jealous of her mother and angry with him because she believes the rumors. In Dragon Destiny, he is portrayed as a much more serious character as compared to the first season. Like his manga counterpart, he has his eye gouged out but by a needle hidden in the assassin's mouth. After being ordered by Sousou to avenge Kakuka's death, he decided to do it his own way instead of attacking in a way that betrays his beliefs. Kakouton had been growing aware of the increasing blood-thirsty behavior of Sousou's Dragon and Sousou becoming extremely violent more often, and decided to confront the "Devil King". Unfortunately, he was overpowered and was presumed to be killed by Sousou. In the end, Kaku finds him sitting alone in a street, though he is now suffering from amnesia and only remembers Kakuka and Sousou as his friends and allies.

Kakouton is seen trying to regain his memories in an episode of Great Guardians, and meets Ryofu on a bus doing the same. Kakouton decides to go with Ryofu to help her and maybe himself. Kakouton meets Saji/Ouin and tells him that Kakouen can help him with his memories. Ryofu passes out and Kakouton tries to help her but is stopped by Kakouen. Hakufu shows up to stop Kakouen's next attack and triggers some of Kakouton's memories of when they first met. Kakouton finally stands up for himself, throwing away his backpack which has his repair kit in it. Hakufu reminds Kakouton how important that kit is to him and finally remembers everything. Kakouton then defeats Kakouen, telling her that he will find his own way to Sousou.

Houkou Kakuka (郭嘉 奉孝, Kakuka Hōkō)
Voiced by: Takayuki Fujimoto (Japanese); Jay Lerner (Season 1), Wayne Grayson (Season 2) (English)
A third-year student at Kyosho Academy and the best friend to Sousou and Kakouton. He was destined to die of cancer, but somehow was cured. He oddly flickered like a ghost around Kaku, his sweetheart. Reasonably strong and highly manipulative (perhaps even against Sousou himself), he was put into a coma by Yojo Bashoku, who framed Kannei of Nanyo for the attack. In the anime, he did not suffer from cancer and was killed by Bashoku in Ikki Tousen: Dragon Destiny instead of being put into a coma. He is stabbed in the heart rather than in the back, and dies from his wounds. He was much stronger as well, being able to defeat Ryomou very easily in the first season. Bashoku had to resort to poisoning before being able to kill him. Later in the story, it was revealed that Koumei of Seito, knowing that Sousou would want vengeance, arranged for Kakuka's murder in Kannei's name for several reasons: to divert Kyosho attacks away from Seito, to weaken Kyosho as they attempt to attack both Seito and Nanyo, and to make Nanyo more receptive to the possibility of an alliance with Seito when the time is right. To this day, very few people know the circumstances behind Kakuka's death. Koumei and Bashoku kept their role in Kakuka's death a secret, but Saji of Nanyou guessed the truth.

Shikou Soujin (曹仁 子孝, Sōjin Shikō)
Voiced by: Chiwa Saitō (Japanese); Bonnie Gordon (English)
A third-year student at Kyosho Academy who launched an assault on Seito. She was given one of the Hyakuhekitō to use in battle, but her gang could not get past Kanshou. She tried to distract Kansho by flashing her shorts in front of him but he knocked her out instead, her own men attributing that she looked too boyish for that plan to have worked. Personality-wise, Soujin is a tomboy who easily loses her temper when insulted, especially when her feminity is concerned.

Soujin plays a major role in Ikki Tousen: Xtreme Xecutor. In the beginning, she was present at Kyosho during Bachou Mouki's attempt to fight Sousou. Later, she was chosen as one of two Kyosho representatives (the other being Kyocho Chuukou) sent to participate at a tournament on Nanban Island, which was actually a trap. Captured by Nanban fighters, Soujin was the one who identified Teni among the attackers, giving the viewers a clue to the identity of the mysterious Kentei. According to Koukin, Soujin is a B-rank fighter who is in charge of leading and managing low-ranking Kyosho fighters.

Chuukou Kyocho (許褚 仲康, Kyocho Chūkō)
Voiced by: Hana Takeda (Japanese); Kelly Shane-Butler (Season 2), Sara Lahti (Season 4) (English)
A very tall first-year student at Kyosho Academy and one of Sousou's loyal fighters; she was easily able to block a powerful chi blast from Sousou aimed towards Shibai. Although Chuukou plays for Kyosho's volleyball team, she is also part of the school's stitching club and is wanted for the judo club. Chuukou and Sousou used to be in a judo club when they were younger, but due to her staggering height for her age, she was picked on and assumed to be a male by the other male club members. After what could be called an attempted molestation (being that the judo club members used force to reveal whether or not she was male or female), Sousou walked in and his dragon manifested itself. He easily slaughtered all that were there in an attempt to protect his friend. After regaining consciousness, Chuukou embraced Sousou and calmed his rage. Because of this, Chuukou resolved to protect him even if it cost her life to do so. She also possesses the largest bust size of all the female fighters, measuring 99cm in circumference.

In Ikki Tousen: Dragon Destiny, she is ordered by Shibai to keep an eye on Sousou if he becomes too powerful. Chuukou is one of the participants of the Battle of Red Cliffs. After that battle, she returns to playing for her volleyball team.

In Ikki Tousen: Xtreme Xecutor, Chuukou fights Bachou Mouki during her attempt to confront Sousou. When the tournament on Nanban Island is announced, she is chosen as one of two representatives of Kyosho, along with Soujin, for the tournament. When Nanban warriors ambushed the would-be contestants on a boat, Chuukou and Mouki eluded capture and swim to Nanban Island, where the two former opponents gradually make peace with each other as Chuukou describes Sousou to Mouki from her own point of view. Later, Chuukou and Mouki meet with Hakufu during an attempt to rescue the imprisoned fighters. Chuukou helps to fight off numerous Nanban fighters during the final battle and is later seen with Sousou and her comrades when they recover Teni.

Myosai Kakouen (夏侯淵 妙才, Kakōen Myōsai)
Voiced by: Eri Kitamura (Japanese); Georgette Reilly (English)
A female assassin Sousou once saved, earning her total loyalty. She is extremely skilled, even more so than Ryofu (however this may have been due to Ryofu's illness had reached its final stages at the time they fought), and very durable to the point of seemingly not feeling any pain, and specializes in pressure point attacks. She uses a jade shot attached to a very long metal wire as a projectile and for restraining her foes. She develops a deep respect for Choun when they fought each other, and Choun recognizes that Kakouen is fighting for someone who is very important in her life (Sousou). Kakouen attacks her own allies when they catch Ryubi, claiming that she wanted to capture Ryubi herself, but was stabbed from behind by one of Sousou's fighters. However, Choun defeated the fighter and ordered him to bring Kakouen back to Kyosho safely.

In Ikki Tousen: Dragon Destiny, it is revealed that Sousou found her years ago in a war zone of a jungle somewhere, presumably in Southeast Asia. Kakouen was dressed in army fatigues, suggesting she was a rebel or revolutionary of some sort, and she was nearly raped by a soldier (she was not wearing any pants and her underwear has been pulled down). The soldier is shown with a bullet wound in his back, which suggests either Kakouen killed him herself or Sousou did to save her (he is not shown holding any weapons, but Kakouen is holding a gun). Sousou was dressed as a tourist at the time he saved her, and it is presumed that he took her back to Japan with him. Kakouen was defeated by Ryomou and Saji in the Battle of Red Cliffs, and was also the only Kyosho fighter whose fate was not revealed in the anime's ending.

In Ikki Tousen: Great Guardians, Kakouen is revealed to be alive and in charge of Kyosho Academy due to the absence of Sousou and Kakouton. In the aftermath of the Battle of Red Cliffs, she seemed determined to restore Kyosho's former glory and power and was desperately searching for any sign of her beloved leader Sousou. When approached by a mysterious girl (the real Genpou Saji) with a deal to recover the missing Kakouton, Kakouen warily accepted. Afterwards, Kakouen worked with Ouin and distracted Kakouton while Ouin made off with Ryofu. As she was about to finish Kakouton, she was interrupted by Hakufu. In the end, Kakouen was defeated by Kakouton, who tells her that he will find his own way to Sousou and return to Kyosho when he is ready. Later, under the influence of the real Saji's genjutsu, she viciously fights Kakouton and Koukin, only to be interrupted by Sousou's return which breaks her hypnotized state. She then returned to Kyosho with Kakouton and Sousou.

Before the events of Ikki Tousen: Xtreme Xecutor, Kakouen returned to her home country for unknown reasons. She is seen along with Sousou and others after they recover Teni.

Chuutatsu Shibai (司馬懿 仲達, Shiba'i Chūtatsu)
Voiced by: Mitsuki Saiga (Japanese); Eileen Stevens (Season 2), Julie Rei Goldstein (Season 4) (English)
The strategist of Kyousho Academy and arch-nemesis of Koumei. She is paraplegic, having lost her feet years ago while Ten'i went on a killing rampage, and uses a wheelchair for mobility. She also has a dragon tattoo on her right hand (in the anime, they glow whenever she uses her chi or senses a strong opponent). Teni looked up to Shibai and called her "Maria-sama" (Lady Maria), treating her as a divine higher power. Shibai is secretly running Kyosho and is also Sousou's lover. She is secretly manipulating Sousou towards an ill-defined goal, and shows no signs of sympathy towards her loyal fighters. For example, she did not show any remorse towards Teni after she was horribly injured by Ryomou during their battle. She was almost killed by Sousou during one of his dragon stages but was saved just in time by Kyocho.

In Ikki Tousen: Dragon Destiny, she plans to send the world into chaos by using Sousou and other evil spirits. During the Battle of Red Cliffs, she attempted to run over her enemies in a car but crashed. It was during this she revealed that she could still actually walk, her crippleness was thought to be a deception tactic. She attacked Ryubi but was cut down by Kanu. She merged her powers with Sousou and her physical body crumbled away. It is also a thought that after the Battle of Red Cliffs, her spirit was somehow reborn with the ashes around her into the main antagonist of Xtreme Xecutor, Kentei (獻帝, the equivalent of Xian Di). This is thought because in an episode, Teni is seen in the Chapel asking for her "Maria-sama" to return. Seconds later, a cloaked figure appears and Teni says, "I knew you would return."

It is later revealed by Kentei in volume 18, chapters 121 & 122 of the manga that Shibai's real name is Shikyo Gifu (魏諷 子京, Gifū Shikyō), the Japanese equivalent of Wei Feng who was a minor figure in Ancient China.

Teni (典韋, Ten'i)
Voiced by: Mikako Takahashi (Japanese); Melissa Hope (Season 2), Rachel Hirschfeld (Season 4) (English)
A psychotic powerful archer and assassin barely in her teen years, wearing Gothic Lolita fashion. She has Catholic beliefs, and believes Shibai to be the Messiah and worships her unquestioningly. Teni was raped by her father as a child, but she killed him in self-defense. She spent her early school life being abused, mostly by most of the other children. Teni then learned how to fight, kill, and play the guitar from Shibai, whom she adores. She tried to assassinate Ryomou and retrieve the Gyokuji but Ryomou's dragon woke up and ripped off her right arm, nearly killing her in the process (this was omitted in the anime). Teni is currently in a coma. She possessed a Hyakuhekitō called the 100-Swing Dragon Blade, hidden inside an electric guitar (she does not possess it in the anime). Instead of fighting Kochu in the anime, she fights Choun instead. According to Soujin, Teni was kept apart from the regular Kyosho fighters and took orders directly from Shibai. Because of this, Ten'i is not well-known within the Kyosho ranks and usually only the high-ranking Kyosho fighters (i.e. Sousou, Kakouton, Chukou, Soujin) have any contact with her. By the end of Ikki Tousen: Dragon Destiny, she fully recovers and is last seen tending to horses with Choryo.

In Ikki Tousen: Xtreme Xecutor, she demonstrated a fervent desire to be reunited with Shibai. When Shibai appears to her in the form of the evil Kentei, Teni again pledges her loyalty to her "Maria-sama". When the fake tournament at Nanban Island is announced, Teni is assigned as the leader of the Nanban warriors whose mission is to subdue and capture the fighters from Kyosho, Nanyou and Seito sent as tournament representatives. Later in the story, she engages in battle with Bachou Mouki as Kentei fights Sonsaku. Despite the enmity, Mouki seems more interested in saving Teni from her misguided loyalty to Kentei and even attempts to save her life when she is in danger of falling from a great height. In the end, Teni falls into the forest below and is apparently lost. After the battle on Nanban Island, a masked stranger wearing a nun's habit is reported to be killing fighters. Mouki tracks down the killer and discovers that it is Teni, now possessed by Kentei's spirit. Kentei then attempts to corrupt Mouki by bringing up the dark, painful memories of her brother's near-fatal injuries along with promises of revenge against Sousou Moutoku. Sousou himself and his comrades approach from behind and put a stop to Kentei's actions. Sousou then picks up Teni's unconscious body and walks away, presumably with the aim of nursing Teni back to health and sanity.

In the video game Ikki Tousen: Eloquent Fist, taking place after the events of Dragon Destiny, Teni became obsessed with finding Shibai after her disappearance, going as great lengths seemingly in vain which caused her to rampage, where as she almost killed Ryomou and Choun when she thought she had sensed Shibai.

Bunen Chouryou (張遼 文遠, Chōryō Bun'en)
Voiced by: Takahiro Mizushima (Japanese); Wayne Grayson (English)
One of Shibai's devoted followers, often seen pushing her wheelchair. He takes over Kaku's place as the strategist, but keeps Kaku in his group (in the anime, he tells Kaku that it is Shibai who is taking over her position as Sousou's strategist, not himself, which prompted Kaku's determination to fight for herself). He was the one who ordered the Ugan gang to attack Hakufu and Teni to attack Ryomou (he does not command the group in the anime, though). When he visited Teni after her fight with Ryomou, he realizes that Shibai does not care for Teni or himself, as she just using them to reach her goal. At the end of Dragon Destiny, he is last seen with Teni, tending to horses.

Koumei Jokou (徐晃 公明, Jokō Kōmei)
Voiced by: Kōji Yusa (Japanese); Anthony Salerno (English)
A member of the Three Pillared Gods (許昌三柱神), Kyosho Academy's elite trio of A-ranked fighters. His predecessor had skills that equaled Kanu's 1800 years ago. In the original battle, Jokou had forced Kanu to retreat; in the present, Jokou challenged Kanu and even knocked her out. However, Kanu recovered and was able to defeat him. Jokou took a risk and bluffed about how Kyosho's other fighters had Seito surrounded and were about to hunt down Ryuubi. Although at the time Cho-un kept the school and Ryuubi protected, Kanu decided not to risk Ryubi's safety and surrendered. After the Battle of Red Cliffs in Dragon Destiny, the Three Pillared Gods become a tourist attraction in the mountains.

Bunken Gakushin (樂進 文謙, Gakushin Bunken)
Voiced by: Shiho Kawaragi (Japanese); Melissa Hope (English)
Another member of Kyosho's Three Pillared Gods with the ability to read an individual's magatama by French kissing them. When she read Kanu's mind, she discovered her love for Ryubi. However, she also had a vision of Kanu's predecessor from 1800 years ago. Gakushin broke down and was left stunned when she realized just how powerful Kanu is when she was reawakened. She also uses her kiss to read Koukin's magatama, discovering the whereabouts of one of the Hyakuhekitō. In the anime, the timing of her reading Kanu's mind is different; in the manga, she does it after Jokou knocked Kanu out, but in the anime she does it after Kanu surrenders and is taken prisoner.

Shungai Chouko (張郃 儁乂, Chōko Shungai)
The last of Kyosho's Three Pillared Gods to be introduced. He uses his staff to touch Kanu's underwear when she is tied. At the Battle of Red Cliff, he is defeated by Koukin.

Shizen Osou (王雙 子全, Ōsō Shizen)
Voiced by: Showtaro Morikubo
One of Sousou's fighters sent to the arena. In the manga, he is beaten by Koukin when trying to take his and Hakufu's magatama.

Bunsoku Ukin (于禁 文则, Ukin Bunsoku)
The assassin sent to attack Kanu. He is shown to be perverted when he has fun seeing her clothes torn. However, he is defeated.

Shiun Kakouon (夏侯恩 子雲, Kakōon Shiun) and Junudo (淳于導, Jun'udō)
Kakouon and Junudo are the guardians of Kyosho. They are sent to defend the area where Choun attacks. As in the novel, Kakouon uses the sword Seikou (青公, Seikō/Qing Gong).

Buntatsu Ritsuu (李通 文達, Ritsū Buntatsu)
The stalker who follows Bachou in the pilot chapter of volume 1, but is beaten to run by Kansui. He later receives Ryofu's magatama from Kakuka and Kakouton, and possessed a monstrous strength. He defeated Kansui and Houtoku but was later defeated by "Kin" Bachou.

Shikei Moutatsu (孟達 子慶, Mōtatsu Shikei)
The girl Ryuubi came to the library with after her fight with Kanu. She actually defected to Kyosho and used a sleeping powder to knock Ryuubi unconscious to make it easier for Kyosho fighters to capture her.

Gyukin (牛金, Gyūkin)
A fighter who proclaims he is "better than Kyocho in a battle". He appears while Koukin escapes from Kaku and was about to stop him, but was defeated after just one blow.

=== Seito Academy ===
Seito Academy (成都學園, Seito Gakuen) is a high school named after Chengdu, which based on the Shu Kingdom of the Three Kingdoms period. Its leader is Gentoku Ryuubi.

Uncho Kan'u (関羽 雲長, Kan'u Unchō)
Voiced by: Hiroe Oka (Season 1), Hitomi Nabatame (Season 2–onwards) (Japanese); Erica Shaffer (Season 1), Carol Jacobanis (Season 2), Rachel Robinson (Seasons 3-4) (English)
A third-year student at Seito Academy and was an A-Rank fighter however, after the events of the battle against Soso Motoku and the start of the attack of fighters from the Kansai region under the leadership of Himiko Kan'u became even stronger and is a S-Rank fighter now thus making her the strongest fighter of Kanto so far. She wears a variation of her school's uniform, where her shirt only extends to her midriff section, and wears baggy socks, which are common aspects of the kogal and ganguro styles among Japanese schoolgirls. Believed to be the most feared and powerful fighter in the Kanto region, she carries the nearly invincible Blue Dragon Crescent Blade from her predecessor as well as the legendary sword Kusanagi, and also has an overwhelming amount of chi. She believes her destiny is to die protecting Ryuubi. It is believed by many characters that Ryomou will one day kill her. She is presumed to be an old friend of Kakouton and Kakuka. Despite this, however, she seems to have taken an interest in Koukin (this happens only in the English manga, where it is not present in the original manga). She is eventually forced to side with Sousou and plan an attack on Nanyo in order to protect Ryubi from Kyosho's fighters, who would certainly be after her. When she surrenders, she is treated as a prisoner; she is handcuffed, beaten, and stripped of her clothing. When Ryubi submits the Gyokuji for Kanu's release, Kanu refuses to accept the offer and stays as a prisoner under her own will. Sousou respects Kanu's wishes and orders the Gyokuji to be returned to Seito. Kanu is able to break free from her handcuffs, clearly holding back while she was captive. She is now treated more fairly while being kept under Sousou's orders.

In the first anime adaptation, Kanu only appears in two episodes to fight with Ryomou and Hakufu (including Hakufu's dragon mode), with Kanu's overconfidence led to her arm being broken by Ryomou. She then got serious and beats off Ryomou using only her legs and left arm, but still won a second fight against Hakufu while she was in her dragon state. Kanu was expected to win the fighter's tournament before she unexpectedly forfeited after her fight against Hakufu. Animation-wise, this Kanu shows both her eyes, which is a totally different hairstyle/look compared to the manga and second season (she is not completely one-eyed in the second season, though; in a few brief scenes both eyes are shown). The blade part of her weapon was never shown in the first season, but is shown from the second season onwards. The Seito school color also appears to be teal instead of blue.

In Dragon Destiny, Kanu is similar to her manga counterpart in terms of appearance. Like her predecessor in Romance of the Three Kingdoms, she is one of the pivotal characters in the events of the series, as she lives her destiny as Ryuubi's protector and as one of the strongest fighters alive. Being the main character in this sequel, Kanu's invincibility was played down to make her character more believable; she was not portrayed as strong as compared to the manga and the first anime series. Kanu is less flirtatious, less confident, insecure, and her intentions towards Ryubi are more obvious. She even admits her love for Ryubi to Koukin.

When she sides with Sousou and with Hakufu looking to challenge Sousou to a fight, Kanu accepts the fight on his behalf. She is seen with a new dark, yet still revealing costume, possibly acting as a metaphor for defecting to Kyosho's evil leader. However, Kanu's loyalty to Ryuubi does not shake, nor does her superiority over other fighters (as Choun pointed out and later proven by Kanu herself when she broke free of her handcuffs under her own power, she could have just left Kyosho if she wanted to). She made it clear to Kakouton that she will kill Sousou if he attempts to assault Seito or harm Ryuubi in any way. She was told to leave Kyosho by Kakouton and she returned to her own school. However she takes Choun's advice to stay away from Ryuubi, allowing Ryuubi to blossom as Seito's leader. She returned at the Battle of Red Cliffs to protect Ryubi. At the end of the series, Kanu is still with Ryuubi, both as her guardian and close friend. A joke at the end has Ryubi recommending Kanu to read a book called Ikki Tousen. The book is meant to be Romance of the Three Kingdoms, in which the series is based on. In Great Guardians, she has finally came into terms with her feelings for Ryuubi (who seems unaware), and often fantisizes about Ryuubi doing intimate things with her on numerous occasions.

Gentoku Ryuubi (劉備 玄德, Ryūbi Gentoku)
Voiced by: Kei Shindō (Japanese); Veronica Taylor (English)
A klutzy, ditzy, bespectacled bookworm with seemingly no combat skills; she cannot even swim. Ryuubi is destined to be a great leader, but is presently too timid and carefree to become one. However, she is still more than willing to do her best for her friends. She is best friends with Chouhi and possesses the most destructive dragon seen, which is so evil that it radiates enthropic energy and nearly made her disembowel herself before Ryomou, Chouhi, and Kanu stopped her, resulting in all of them being critically wounded. She seems unaware of this and is prone to occasional highly destructive outbursts when her dragon rouses. These outbursts happen when Ryubi sees her friends get hurt in battle. Ukitsu alluded that Ryuubi shares Sonsaku's capacity to anticipate enemy moves. Exclusively in the Tokyopop manga, Ryuubi has a fear of homosexuals, wondering if she is homosexual herself, and convinced that Kanu and Chouhi are lesbians who are attracted to her.

In the anime, the initial difference is that the timing of her first dragon possession is different. The first time she is overwhelmed by her dragon in the manga was three years before the start of the manga. In the anime, it happens during the second series. When Kanu was forced to surrender to Sousou, her determination to rescue Kanu has her slowly gaining control of her dragon's powers. She realized that her school had to go into battle with Nanyo and Kyosho in order to finally end the conflict. Although she was targeted by many fighters in the battle, she was capable of protecting herself. Kanu's return gave Ryubi more encouragement. She was almost strangled to death by Sousou but was saved by the returning Hakufu. Also in the anime, Ryubi's first encounter with Hakufu was much earlier than it was in the manga (where they had yet to meet), and both Ryubi and Hakufu teamed up to destroy Sousou and win the battle for Seito and Nanyo. She is now back to her normal book-reading self. In one episode, she acts as though she will kiss Kanu, but instead runs away from her.

Ekitoku Chouhi (張飛 益德, Chōhi Ekitoku)
Voiced by: Minori Chihara (Japanese); Jessica Calvello (English)
Ryuubi's best friend and an avid snack-lover who is a first-year student at Seito Academy. Although quite weak and only a C-ranked fighter, history states that she will one day become so powerful that legends will tell of her matching ten-thousand men (just like Zhang Fei himself), which makes her well-known around town. She has already performed such a feat, although on a much smaller scale, when Kyosho first assaulted Seito to search for Ryubi. Kakouen almost killed her during their fight, but she was luckily saved by Chouun. After Hakufu manages to defeat Soso's spirit from 1800 years ago and rescued Kyosho's Soso Motoku from his demonic powers Chouhi is seen again sitting together with Ryubi, Komei and Suikyo-sensei and having some small talk right before Yamato School's Yagyu Mitsuyoshi makes her first appearance and other fighters from Kansai start their attack on Kanto to conquer the East of Japan. Yagyu encounters Chou'un but the two end their battle and Chou'un brings Yagyu to Seito where she reveals that Chouhi used to be a student at Yamato School, this implies that Chouhi originally comes from Kansai or at least lived their for some time before she went to Seito. Yagyu further tells that Chouhi constantly tried to become stronger but failed to do so during her whole time at Yamato School. Being confronted with her past failure again her comrades start to tease her, especially Komei uses those little information about Chouhi's past too make fun of her which ends leads to Chouhi kicking Komei out of the scene a few times. Due to Yagyu's stay at Seito Hozoin Inshun (another fighter from Kansai, he is S-ranked) attacks Seito and defeats Yagyu with ease, in the same moment Chouhi enters the scene and wants to take revenge for her old friend and takes on Inshun. Yagyu manages to stand up again and teams up with Chouhi against Inshun. In this scene a flashback is shown which reaveals that Yagyu was often bullied by other children and Chouhi helped her but both ended up beaten which forged a friendship between the two girls. Back in the present: Chouhi and Yagyu manage to land a huge hit on Inshun which drives him mad and crazy and he easily defeats them two. Ryubi then makes her enter, her dragon is running wild once again but due to Inhsun being S-ranked he has no struggle to tame Ryubi's dragon with ease and defeats her too which leaves Chouhi speechless while she witnessed the power of Inshun. Chouhi starts to cry because Ryubi is wounded badly after the fight with Inshun however, right in this moment Kan'u makes her step and claims victory over Inshun. In this scene it is also stated that Kan'u is also S-ranged currently, she is even called the strongest of all fighters in rank S, which makes her the strongest fighter judged by power. Chouhi's next seen when Kokin visits Seito to discuss the matter of the attacks of the Kansai fighters and suggests that Seito, Nanyo and Koyhso should cooperate to deal with the situation. Despite the seriousness of the moment Chouhi however, displays her usual comical character and does not take the matter too seriously at first, claiming Seito would be strong enough on their own thus Komei drops some teasing comments of Chouhi's immature nature. Ryubi and Komei agree to work together with Kokin, Nanyo and even Soso and Kyosho and afterwards Gentoku suggests they all should visit Kofukuji, Nara in order to train there to become strong enough to deal with the Kansai fighters and so the Seito, Nanyo, Kyosho group plus Goei travel to Nara. Chouhi and the others are then seen bathing in a hot spring fooling around, having a party after their arrival. However, things soon get serious again with the attack of Ashiya Doman, who is another S-ranked fighter and first year student of Yamato School. Ashiya is sent to kill the Seito-Nanyo-Kyosho group and attacks them with ninja like speed and strength, Chouhi however, is barely involved in the battle due to being knocked out very early in the confrontation while the others are still fighting against Ashiya. Chouhi is then taken to Shikyo Shonin, a priest at the Nara castle, who offers Chouhi to train her and strengthen her enough to reach Rank S too much to Chouhi's surprise. However, Chouhi agrees without hesitation and Shikyo begins the training with Chouhi to make her reach Rank S which is very brutal and rough for Chouhi. With this Ikki Tousen ends and Chouhi's training and progress continues in Shin Ikki Tousen.

Her anime incarnation portrays her as a bossy character, and is frustrated that Ryuubi is not the powerful fighter she is meant to be as Seito's leader. Despite that, she is still best friends with Ryuubi and Kanu. She is strong enough to throw Kanu several stories into the air (probably representing Zhang Fei's roar at Changban when the Shu forces were retreating from Cao Cao). At the end of the series, she is seen in a restaurant with Kochu, hinting that the two could be a couple.

Shiryu Chou'un (趙雲 子龍, Chōun Shiryū)
Voiced by: Yū Asakawa (Japanese); Michele Knotz (English)
A mysterious new girl from Seito High that is presumed to be Seito's "secret weapon". Easily a super A-ranked fighter, she wields one of the Hyakuhekitō swords with extreme efficiency. In the Ryuubi assassination attempt, she singlehandedly defeated Myosai Kakouen, supposedly one of the more powerful A-ranked characters in the series, literally with her eyes closed while defending Ryuubi from henchmen. She presents herself with her eyes closed most of the time, and is the only girl in Seito that does not wear the standard Seito Academy girls' uniform. She believes that violence is unnecessary and that bloodshed can be avoided to solve conflicts. She has deep respect for Kanu while their strengths rival one another.

Chouun is arguably the most skilled fighter in both the manga and anime series so far (although she herself refers to Kanu as Seito's strongest fighter). Contrary to her looks, she is very laid back. Instead of being sent by Koumei to save Ryuubi from Kakouen's assassination attempt, Chouun was sent by Kanu to defeat Teni and Ryomou's dragon before claiming the Dragon Jade. There is no way to tell her true potential because of her limited fights and her lack of seriousness in them. So far, no fighter has given her a real challenge or even put a tear on her uniform. At the end of the series, she is seen doing a bad attempt at flower arranging. Though it is not clearly pointed out whether she harbors a dragon or not, it is seen in a few flashes, in between her fight scenes, that her eyes are cat-like when open, very similar to those who harbor their dragons with control. This anomaly is also seen in the last episode of the OVA when she plunges a warning sign at the eavesdroppers outside the hot springs. However, in transitions between scenes for Dragon Destiny, she has been drawn revealing a tiger tattoo on her left shoulder blade.

Chouun has a larger role in Great Guardians. At the beach, when Ryuubi was attacked by sharks, she defeated them with one blow. Chouun's eye color is shown as light blue.

Koumei Shokatsuryou (諸葛亮 孔明, Shokatsuryō Kōmei)
Voiced by: Mai Kadowaki (Japanese); Rebecca Soler (Season 2), Megan Harvey (Seasons 3-4) (English)
A young girl who appears to harbor a dragon (obviously Zhuge Liang himself, who is released after some major feat at the Battle of Red Cliffs) herself. Quiet and enigmatic, it has been suggested that she has been manipulating many great events throughout the series despite being very young. This was stated by Saji, who may have worked for her. She is very attached to Ryuubi, often staying by her side and preventing others from getting in between them. She is destined to be Shibai's arch-nemesis. In preparation for the Battle of Red Cliffs, Koumei has awakened the spirit of the original Zhuge Liang within her.

In Dragon Destiny, she is completely loyal to Ryuubi to the point that she might have a crush on her, and is set on accomplishing Ryuubi's goals no matter what. At one point, she wanted to be the one who takes a bath with Ryuubi. Among other things, she chose the destination for the Battle of Red Cliffs. At the end of the series, she returns to doing her favorite hobby, fishing. She is fascinated by the size of Ryuubi's breasts, which was shown in the first OVA when she compares the breasts of Chouhi, Kanu and Ryuubi in an open-air bath much to their discomfort, and picks Ryuubi's as her favorite because they are the softest.

Kanshou Kochuu (黃忠 漢升, Kōchū Kanshō)
Voiced by: Kenta Miyake (Japanese); Rome Eliott (Season 2), Kyle Hebert (Seasons 3-4) (English)
A monk that worked alongside Genchoku Josho at Tougenin. He first appeared to block Chouhi when she and Ryuubi went to look for Kanu, who was in turn looking for Koumei. He appears to be quite embarrassed by girls, given that he blushes a lot when he sees female flesh or belongings such as panties. He is very strong, however, being able to fight off Teni with ease by being able to block and break her blades with his bare hands as well as take a shot by Hyakuhekitō to the shoulder and still be able to subdue Ryomou when her dragon was unleashed. It is implied that he will kill Kakouen, just like his predecessor did 1,800 years ago.

In the anime, when he put on the Shinro Stone necklace (which reveals a person's true nature), he began hitting on Kanu and Chouhi, which led to him getting beaten up on occasion. However, since he does not fight Teni in the anime, it is unknown how strong he really is. At the end of Dragon Destiny, he is seen in a restaurant with Chouhi, who could now be his sweetheart.

Yojo Bashoku (馬謖 幼常, Bashoku Yōjō)
Voiced by: Yukiko Amada (Season 2), Mami Kameoka (Season 3) (Japanese); Eileen Stevens (Season 2), Veronica Taylor (Season 4) (English)
An assassin sent by Koumei to kill Kakuka and frame Kannei of Nanyo for the crime. Although her fighting skills did not match up to Kakuka's, her early preparation of poisoning her blades led to her victory, causing Kakuka to fall into a coma (in the anime, she ends up killing him). She reappears during Seito and Nanyo's assault and was later attacked by a possessed Kannei. In Dragon Destiny, she travels to Nanyo to tell Koukin, Saji and the others that Sousou defeated Hakufu and captured Kanu. Saji was able to recognize her as Kakuka's real killer and knows it was she that framed Kannei for the murder, though he flirts with her anyway. Her main purpose is to bring in reports on Kyosho and Nanyo to Koumei and to defend Seito with Kochu should Sousou ever invade the school. At the end of the series, she joins Koumei for some fishing.

Bachou Mouki (馬超 孟起, Mōki Bachō)
Voiced by: Aya Endō (Japanese); Cherami Leigh (English)
One of the original main characters when the series was being created. She is similar to Hakufu as a ditzy, yet very strong fighter. Instead of having a dragon state, she had the actual spirit of Ma Chao kept in her magatama. When Mouki found her friends seriously hurt in an attack, Ma Chao awakened and temporarily took over her body. She became very powerful and violent, much like Hakufu in her dragon state.

Mouki makes her first anime appearance in Ikki Tousen: Xtreme Xecutor. Like her manga counterpart, she is similar to Hafuku as a ditzy, yet very strong fighter. In her first appearance in the anime, she infiltrates Kyosho, searching for Sousou in order to avenge her brother Kansui (who was apparently fatally injured in a fight against Sousou), and easily dodging or knocking down anyone getting her way, including Soujin. She looks up to Hakufu as a mentor and would sometimes train with her when necessary. She is ultimately defeated by Kyocho after the latter explained that Sousou is not around for Mouki to meet. Mouki is seen later walking despondently after failing to complete her objective and after being caught in the rain, she is found by Ryuubi, who calls her "Maa-chan". She has a strong fear of snakes, though she would temporarily get over her phobia when she aided Hakufu in beheading a snake when they were on Nanban's lower levels. They would escape and she would battle the Kentei-infused Teni three more times, twice at Nanban and one more back at Kanto when she was browsing through town. She would call Koukin "a goldfish shit" and acted like she hated him while hiding the fact that she had a semi-mild crush on him, but would treat him a bit nicer when they were at Nanban once she figured out what kind of man he really was. After Kentei's disappearance and her avenging Hakufu's seeming death at the hands of Teni's explosion arrow, she would run into Motoku Sousou himself, though she surprisingly listened to every word he said without fail and due to that, she would join Seito.

Shigen Houtou (龐統 士元, Hōtō Shigen) / Shiyoku Shokan (蔣幹 子翼, Shōkan Shiyoku)
A B-ranked fighter and a spy for Seito currently posing as Shiyoku Shokan, a Kyosho student. She is an expert at using medical needles. She was one of the three girls who seduced Koukin in an attempt for him to defect to Sousou's side, and she gave him "extra attention" afterwards to make sure he would not escape. While Koukin was asleep, she sneaked around the school and discovered Junyu with the Hyakuhekitou sword. Junyu caught her spying on him and the two fought. Houto's clothes were cut to shreds and she escaped naked. She reappeared back in bed with Koukin and gave him a message from Koumei, as well as revealing to him what was going on. In the anime, Houto is seen in the last episode of the Dragon Destiny OVA.

Suikyou (水鏡, Suikyō)
Voiced by: Shōto Kaishii (Japanese); Mike Pollock (English)
Kanu and Chouhi's master. He often tells them about Ryuubi's fate, and is very fond of alcohol.

Tanfuku (單福)
Voiced by: Uncredited (Japanese); Paracleto Kaborka (English)
Seito's advisor. Once Kanu goes to the forest, he challenges her to a fight and defeats her, then takes Kanu back to Shibaki's house.

Kichou Baryou (馬良 季常, Baryō Kichō) and Buncho Gien (魏延 文長, Gien Bunchō)
Tanfuku's disciples who often travel with him in the forest.

Shuusou (周倉, Shūsō)
A student at Seito who was seen in a special chapter of the manga, where she gives Kanu a present and confesses her admiration towards her.

== Other schools ==
=== Yoshu Academy ===
Yoshu Academy (揚州学園, Yōshū Gakuen) is a high school led by Seirei Ryuyo. It is named after Yangzhou.

Shigi Taishiji (太史慈 子義, Taishiji Shigi)
Voiced by: Kenta Miyake (Japanese); Patrick Seitz (English)
A skilled and honorable fighter of African descent, sporting dreadlocks and dressing in hip-hop fashion. He refused to kill Hakufu despite being ordered to do so, and later tried to stop other assassins from finishing his job, but was stabbed in the back as a consequence, putting him in a coma and paralyzing him from the waist down. However, he seems to be recovering from his injuries. He used to be one of Ukitsu's sparring partners, and it is said that Ukitsu always held back when sparring with Shigi because she liked him, though she was still injuring him in these fights (omitted in the anime). While Shiji was kept in the hospital, a girl from Nanyo often visited him and sat by his side. It turns out that the girl was transferring her chi into Shigi for him to recover from his injuries. He wakes up from his coma in time to join the Battle of Red Cliffs, rescuing several injured Nanyo/Seito fighters and defeating Kannei, who was possessed by Ryofu's bloodlust. In the anime, he does not recover from his coma and is presumed to be dead.

Seirei Ryuuyou (劉繇 正礼, Ryūyō Seirei)
Voiced by: Ryuzo Hasuike (Japanese); Lance J. Holt (English)
Yoshu's leader.

Hannou (樊能, Hannō)
Voiced by: Takayuki Hujimoto (Japanese); Jason C. Miller (English)
The first fighter Hakufu fights ever. He reappears in the Kanto Battle fighting for Yoshu. He also is not a real fighter, as told by Shigi when Hannou grabbed a metal object to fight Hakufu with.

=== Rakuyo High School ===
Rakuyo High School (洛陽高校, Rakuyō-kōkō) is a high school named after Luoyang, a prefecture-level city in the western Henan province of China and a former capital of China during the Three Kingdoms period. Rakuyo was the first of the schools to fall following Toutaku's death.

Chuuei Toutaku (董卓 仲穎, Tōtaku Chūei)
Voiced by: Daisuke Namikawa (Japanese); Sam Riegel (English)
The leader of Rakuyo High who, until his death, held most of the other schools in a vise grip, possessing both the manpower and the Gyokuji as well as a Hyakuhekitō. In addition, he possesses Dragon of Hao abilities, yet he is not one of them. He is also a masochist, which is seen through his self-mutilation. Exceptionally powerful and arrogant, he attempted to kill off Hakufu in order to change his destiny. He eventually ends up killing Choshou, and is brought to a near-death state by Ryofu directly after the fight with Choshou. He partially changes his fate by committing suicide instead of letting Ryofu kill him. Though the end results are still the same, he at least died with some self-satisfaction. Three years before the start of the manga, he devised a plan which led to Ryubi's dragon awakening for the first time.

In the anime, he has a somewhat more refined mannerism to his sinister nature, and he is far more skilled as well; he demonstrated the power to split a watermelon and a table with his chi into perfect pieces with just a tap from his fingers, and even poisoned Hakufu with his chi. He was also able to possess her and take control of her body. He also seems to dislike watermelons, supposedly because opening them reminds him of the inside of a human's head. His body is destroyed by Ryofu, who uses a double suicide chi blast, at which point he transmigrates into Hakufu, only to be eaten by her dragon later on. It seems as though he had a change of heart on the brink of his death, revealing to Hakufu the truth about Saji being the mastermind behind all this, and that Genpou Saji is not his real identity. He also uses a bit of his remaining strength after being destroyed by Ryofu's double suicide to remove the Fa Jing curse he had previously lain upon her.

Housen Ryofu (呂布 奉先, Ryofu Hōsen)
Voiced by: Akeno Watanabe (Japanese); Zarah Little (English)
A strong fighter with bluish-green hair styled in bunches, Ryofu has had sexual relations with guys and girls, notably Saji and Chinkyuu. In the manga, she has a love-hate relationship with Saji, who she claims once raped her (Saji only half-denies this, claiming that she was not raped because she enjoyed it). She is afflicted with a terminal illness that would kill her before adulthood, she is manipulated by Saji into attacking Toutaku. When she found out that Chinkyuu was raped, she went in search of revenge as her last living act. She was found by Kakouen, and the two fought each other. Kakouen's skill added with Ryofu's failing health was enough for Ryofu to be defeated. She was saved from Kakouen's killing blow by Chinkyuu. Realizing that she was moments away from dying, Ryofu and Chinkyuu then committed a double suicide, dying happily together as their predecessors did 1800 years before.

In the anime adaptation, Ryofu is a capable fighter, but more promiscuous than her manga counterpart, as shown when she molests Ryomou. She also sleeps with multiple guys and Chinkyuu on the girls side. She avenges Chinkyuu's death by trying to fight Hakufu at Toutaku's place, ending up committing murder suicide with Toutaku with a point-blank chi blast. In Dragon Destiny, her death is recalled differently as she tackles Toutaku off a cliff. At the beginning of Great Guardians, she and Kan'u fight until she is struck by lightning. She is supposedly dead, however, she reappears to Ryomou without any memory of her past. she went to Rakuyo in search of clues regarding her past, there being abducted by Ouin and brainwashed by the real Genpou Saji, thus gaining a more cheerful but visibily false persona. From there on, she played with Ouin so as to fill Ryomou with jealousy until Saji herself was discovered, when she was turned into a frenzied berserk as a mean of halting Hakufu and her companions. The last episodes also reveal that, in fact, this Ryofu is actually much like a living dead, a spirit partially resurrected by Saji that, after regaining her senses, fades again from this world, bidding farewell to Ryomou. Still, one last line from her can be heard when Saji is praying at her tomb ("Thank you").

Koudai Chinkyuu (陳宮 公台, Chinkyū Kōdai)
Voiced by: Hiroe Oka (Japanese); Stephanie Sheh (English)
Ryofu's childhood friend and lesbian lover, and a C-rank fighter with great potential. While Ryofu was battling Totaku, Chinkyuu knocked out Kaku to prevent her from interfering. Kaku retaliated when she caught Chinkyuu stealing the Gyokuji and got Chizen Rikaku to rape her. When Chinkyuu recovered from her injuries, she saves Ryofu from being killed by Myosai. However, she realizes that Ryofu is moments away from dying due to her illness. Since she was loyal and in love with Ryofu, Chinkyuu decides to stay by her friend's side and commits suicide with her instead of surrendering to Sousou. In the anime, she dies in the hospital from injuries inflicted when she was raped. She also tried to steal the Gyokuji on her own accord, rather than being ordered to do so by Ryofu, and wanted to present it to Ryofu as a gift before she died.

Bunwa Kaku (賈詡 文和, Kaku Bunwa)
Voiced by: Haruhi Nanao (Season 1), Shiho Kawaragi (Season 2–onwards) (Japanese); Hunter MacKenzie Austin (Season 1, 4), Lisa Ortiz (Season 2) (English)
A bespectacled, long raven-haired beauty who was once Totaku's second-in-command. Intelligent, seductive, and manipulative, her power lay in manipulating others into doing her dirty work as she is otherwise an average fighter. She helped set up the events that led to Ryubi's dragon being awakened three years before the start of the series, and offered to help Enjutsu get the respect he should have had as Nanyo's leader at the time. Knowing Teifu's feelings for Ryomou, Kaku disguised herself as Ryomou and faked a video in which she was about to be raped by Enjutsu's henchmen. Teifu fell for it and was forced into attacking Seito and look for Ryubi in order to protect Ryomou. In reality, the entire plan was devised by Totaku in order to see how powerful Ryubi's dragon was. After Totaku's death, Kaku switches sides and joins Sousou at Kyosho Academy, who accepted her with open arms. She became (or always has been) Kakuka's lover, plotting to take advantage of Sousou's power. She was genuinely in love with him until he was taken out of action. However, she gets into a sexual relationship with whomever she plots with (Totaku, Kakuka and now currently Junyu). She is aware of Koukin's crush on Hakufu (although it is possible that everyone in the series knows it), and also teased him by taking off her underwear in front of him before three other Kyosho girls seduced him in an attempt to make him defect from Nanyo. She suspected Koukin's plan of bodily harm, but failed to plan accordingly.

Kaku's anime counterpart is portrayed as more submissive than her manga counterpart, but is also more trusting and trustworthy. She is less seductive and does not act as calculating or as cunning. Towards the end of the first season, she switches from Rakuyo Academy to Kyosho Academy. In fact, she seems almost caring towards Sousou and his friends, leading them to trust her more, or at least be less suspicious of her. As the strategist Chuutatsu Shibai continues to gain power within Kyosho Academy, Kaku gradually finds herself being kept out of the loop. During this time, some of the more ruthless low-level Kyosho fighters begin to openly mock her. Hearing about the Dragon Jade, she feels that this would be what she needed in order to get back in Sousou's good graces. After informing Kakouen about Kakuka's murder, Kaku orders the assassin to recover the artifact. She could have been working for her own needs after she was told by Sousou that she was no longer necessary for his plans. She was the only Kyosho officer not invited to the Battle of Red Cliffs. She does not appear again for the rest of the series until the end, where she meets an amnesiac Kakouton.

Her henchmen in Rakuyou include Chizen Rikaku (李傕 稚然), Kayuu (華雄) and Kousei (侯成), the Japanese equivalents of Li Jue, Hua Xiong and Hou Cheng respectively. That Kousei betrayed Ryofu and attacked her with his group in Chinkyuu's hospital was based on that Hou Cheng (with two other generals) betrayed Lü Bu for Cao Cao.

=== Gogun High School ===
Gogun High School (吳郡高校, Gogun-kōkō) is a high school named after Wu Commandery, roughly modern Suzhou, Jiangsu, which is led by Ukitsu.

Ukitsu (于吉)
Voiced by: Yumiko Kobayashi (Japanese); Amy Treadwell (Season 1), Hilary Thomas (Season 2) (English)
A dark-skinned girl and the leader of Gogun High who is destined by her magmatama to kill Hakufu, as her predecessor did 1800 years ago. She wears extremely heavy body weights on her wrists and ankles, and is an amazing fighter who has mastered nearly every type of martial arts in existence, using them instinctively and masterfully with nearly no chi whatsoever. She is also tomboyish, as she tends to use "boku" (the male equivalent of "I") when referring to herself. She is nicknamed "Genius Ukitsu" because of her talents and knowledge of martial arts. Since she does not use her chi to fight, Hakufu had a major disadvantage against her; she was unable to predict Ukitsu's moves by reading her chi. Ukitsu's views on fighting are similar to those of Hakufu. She loves to fight and is motivated by taking on stronger opponents (which rarely happened before facing Hakufu). Hakufu's Dragon state easily overpowered Ukitsu and nearly killed her until she was unexpectedly saved by Koukin. Ukitsu became depressed while she was recovering from the fight and has kept a low profile lately. She had a vision of Hakufu's dragon flying through the skies towards Nanyo, which should inspire her to return to action.

Ukitsu plays a more important role in the anime adaptation. She first appears saving Hakufu from two perverted men in a karaoke bar (Hakufu was oblivious to their intentions), and is continually seen watching over Hakufu, as her master Chokou intends to help Hakufu harness her dragon. Ukitsu willingly follows Chokou's orders and challenges Hakufu to a fight several times, but each time Hakufu passes out for some other reason. They finally fight at the end where, unlike the manga, Hakufu manages to tame her Dragon before she can injure Ukitsu. The two become friends and agree to fight again, this time as friends and not as fighters, and seal their bond by removing their magatama.

Ukitsu also appears in Dragon Destiny, this time trying to fully revive Hakufu, where it is revealed that she is also friends with Hakugen. According to Chokou, Ukitsu is the only person who is able to revive Hakufu because it is her destiny to kill her. Since Ukitsu is the one whose fate is to kill Hakufu, then theoretically she can also save her. Chokou also mentioned that her defeat at the hands of Hakufu in the past affected her greatly, an event that was interpreted differently in the first season. So it is possible that the first season's ending is not considered to be canon. This would explain why Ukitsu and her school never helped Hakufu and Nanyo in the war despite the fact that the two schools formed an alliance at the end of the first season. Ukitsu was successful in reawakening Hakufu but died shortly afterwards, sacrificing her life to save Hakufu's. She was buried near a waterfall where she trained.

Kyokou (許貢, Kyokō)
A fighter sent by Ukitsu to fight Hakufu. He uses Muramasa, the Sword of Calamity, as his weapon. He is defeated by Hakufu after his arms and legs were strained.

Goton (呉沌)
A B-ranked fighter sent to receive Hakufu at the gate. He is easily defeated by her.

Chokei (趙景, Chōkei)
The Vice President of Gogun Academy's Student Council. He meets Hakufu at the entrance of Gogun and tells her to pull back, but was quickly defeated in a similar fashion as Hikei was.

Hikei (費敬)
A B-ranked fighter who bears a close resemblance to Bruce Lee. He fights Hakufu when she goes to find Ukitsu for the first time, but is quickly defeated along with Chokei.

=== Yoshu Private School ===
Yoshu Private School (豫州學院, Yōshū Gakuin) is a school named after Yuzhou City, a city located in the central Henan province in China.

Honsho Enshou (袁紹 本初, Enshō Honsho)
A student at Yoshu Private School. He does not make his full appearance in the manga, as he only sent Koshaji to kill Sousou and Kakouton. In the anime adaptation, after Koshaji died, Yoshu is immediately attacked by the Three Pillared Gods of Kyosho led by Kaku. After the deaths of Ganryo and Bunshu, Honsho surrenders to Sousou, but was killed when Sousou orders Kaku to kill everyone to avenge Kakouton's lost eye.

Koshaji (胡車兒)
Voiced by: Hitomi Nabatame (Japanese); Eileen Stevens (English)
An assassin sent to kill Sousou while he was injured from a gang battle. She blinded Kakouton's left eye with a hidden needle attack, which caused Sousou to unleash his Dragon and kill Koshaji for revenge, although we do not see him kill her. In the anime, after Sousou defeats Koshaji, he grabs her by the head and smashes her face-first into a wall, killing her instantly.

Ganryo (顔良, Ganryō)
Voiced by: Jiro Saito (Season 1), Junya Miura (Season 2) (Japanese); Uncredited (Seasons 1-2), Liam O'Brien (Season 4) (English)
An aggressive fighter who even attacks Kouran, his schoolmate, to get the chance to fight for his school. He was defeated by Ryomou.

Bunshu (文醜, Bunshū)
Voiced by: Naoki Kinoshita (Season 2)
A powerful fighter who battled Teifu. He almost killed him until Ryomou attacked him to protect Teifu.

Kouran (高覽, Kōran)
The advance guard of Yoshu Academy. She is arranged to the only fighter of Yoshu in the battle against Nanyo, but Ganryo beats her up to fight in her place.

Denpo (田豊, Denpō)
The strategist of Yoshu. He arranges only Kouran to fight Nanyo because he thinks there is no fair fight using five A-ranked fighters to fight two B-ranks.

== Other schools ==
=== Ryoshu Academy ===
Ryoshu Academy (涼州学園, Ryōshu Gakuen) is a high school named after Liangzhou, a district located in Gansu that is part of the Wuwei prefecture in China. The students of Ryoshu were the original main characters when the manga was first being planned. Although the original and final manga designs have similarities, there were some differences in the story. An example is that it was only the magatamas that originally had the spirits of past warriors and the characters were not modern-day equivalents of important warriors from 1800 years ago, so it was likely that character's destinies would not be featured in the storyline. A few other characters, like Kakouton and Kakuka, appeared, with Kakouton having a much different personality, while Ryofu's magatama was used to turn a fighter named Ritsu Buntatsu into a violent maniac. The pilot chapter is included in volume 1 of the Ikki Tousen manga.

Bachou Mouki (馬超 孟起, Mōki Bachō)
Voiced by: Aya Endo (Japanese); Cherami Leigh (English)
One of the original main characters when the series was being created. She is similar to Hakufu as a ditzy, yet very strong fighter. Instead of having a dragon state, she had the actual spirit of Ma Chao kept in her magatama. When Mouki found her friends seriously hurt in an attack, Ma Chao awakened and temporarily took over her body. She became very powerful and violent, much like Hakufu in her dragon state.

Bunyaku Kansui (韓遂 文约, Kansui Bunyaku)
Voiced by: Yūko Sanpei (Japanese); Jessica D. Stone (English)
One of the original main characters when the series was being created. He is friends with and also a protector of Mouki. He and Teigin fight together against Ritsu, who possessed Ryofu's magatama, but lost. In the current storyline, he is seen in volume 3 fighting for his school.

In the anime, he makes a brief cameo in the first season, but makes a full appearance an episode of Xtreme Xecutor during one of Mouki's flashbacks, at which he was portrayed as her older brother. He looks exactly the same as he was in the manga, aside from being a little older. Throughout the past, he has always protected his sister from any trouble. He no longer protects Mouki after he was apparently fatally injured in a fight against Sousou, causing his sister to start to search for Sousou to avenge his death. But to him, he does not want her to take revenge of his fallen action (death), and wants her to start something new in her life. He had taught Mouki that the courage of believing herself is the key of being the bravest. At the end, she remembers what he had said to her. He wished to be able to help Mouki in the future with whatever she wanted to do.

Teigin (程銀)
One of the original main characters when the series was being created. She, along with Kansui, is a protector of Mouki. She and Kansui fight together against Ritsu, who possessed Ryofu's magatama, but lost later.

Batai (馬岱)

=== Nanban High School ===
Nanban High School (南蠻高校, Nanban-kōkō) is a high school named after Nanman tribe, which is led by Moukaku and Mouyu. Briefly appearing in the first anime adaptation, in which Kanu defeated them in the tournament hosted by Rakuyo High School, they appear again in Ikki Tousen: Xtreme Xecutor..

Moukaku (孟獲, Mōkaku)
Voiced by: Atsuko Tanaka (Japanese); Jessica Straus (English)
One of the leaders of Nanban High. Prior to the start of the series, she, along with her sister Mouyu, attempted to conquer the entire Kanto region. However they were stopped due to the emergence of the Nanyo, Seito and Kyosho leaders. At the start of Xtreme Xecutor, she forms an alliance with Kentei. Moukaku wears a very revealing outfit, consisting of yellow shorts, a sleeveless yellow jacket exposing her bra, a yellow peak hat and yellow boots. Personality-wise, Moukaku is very condescending, adding the word "Dumb-ass" (馬鹿野郎, Baka-yarō) at the end of her sentences. She fights using a modified Chinese ring, which she uses for hand-to-hand combat as well as a throwing weapon. She, along with Mouyu, would experience a change of heart, and decided to re-evaluate how they viewed life and competition before leaving the series completely.

Mouyu (孟優, Mōyū)
Voiced by: Megumi Toyoguchi (Japanese); Lisa Ortiz (English)
The second leader of Nanban High and the level-headed and honorable one of the duo. She went to great lengths to try to kill Gentoku Ryubi, in which she had her meeting with a nude Choun who matched Mouyu's strength and force her to retreat. Mouyu later returns to fight Choun again and was trumped by her sheer power, and opted to take her own life only to be saved by Ryubi's fluctuating power which forced her to change her perspective of ruling Kanto. She would eventually shift sides and aid Seito in the destruction of Kentei's lair (within Nanban) and causing Kentei's full-fledged revival to cease.

King Bokuroku (木鹿大王, Bokuroku-Daiō)
Voiced by: Masuo Amada (Japanese); Mike Pollock (English)
A beastman that was conned by Kentei into accepting a power that would effectively strip him of any humanity that he once had. He appears within Seito's wooded lands to trap and capture Gentoku Ryubi, but is stopped by Mouyu who was then viciously beaten by him. He then tried to force his will on Ryubi and Koumei, who were saved by Gakushu and Hakufu, and was swiftly defeated by them. He, however, would accept even more power from Kentei, buffing him considerably and proving to be a match for everyone until he inadvertently triggered Ryubi's dragon, which shredded him into ribbons while turning her into a semi-comatose dragon.

== Video game characters ==
Chousen (貂蝉, Chōsen)
Voiced by: Yū Kobayashi
A video game-only character who first appears in the PS2 game Ikki Tousen: Shining Dragon, and is allied with Rakuyo High School. Compared to her Three Kingdoms counterpart, Chousen is much more aggressive and brash, and carries a sword as her main weapon. She does not have the same romantic feelings for Ryofu (as the Original Diao Chan did for Lu Bu), but is still on friendly terms with her. Also, Chousen desired to awaken her own Dragon Potent to crush Hakufu and Ryubi (which explains why she shapeshifted into various Nanyo and Seito representatives, which varies among whose storyline one plays as).

A few months later after suffering a humiliating defeat (presumably to Kanu) in Shining Dragon, Chousen returns in the PlayStation Portable game Ikki Tousen: Eloquent Fist, scathing from her last loss and hell-bent on vengeance, but loses her motivation after Kanpei snaps and mows her down with relative ease which sets up her being manipulated by Kyosho (namely Shibai this time) for a second time, but snaps back to normal after being trumped by her close friend, Ryofu. Chousen does have a Dragon ability (albeit a Light-type based Dragon), and either refuses to use it under her own volition or simply does not know how to. Also, Chousen has been relegated to that of a minor bad guy who seemingly seeks revenge for her plans being halted, and sided with Kyosho to seek revenge on Nanyo/Seito when in reality, she was only siding with Kyosho just to stop Sousou from integrating Kanpei into himself. However, it seems that after being defeated by Kanu, she is broken free of a mind control (presumably Sousou's as he comes out to chide Chousen directly after she loses). Like Kanpei's crush on Kanu in Eloquent Fist, Ekitoku has a not-so-intimate girl-crush on Chousen, even going as far as to call her "big sister" in the scene before she fights her Dragon state.

Kanpei (關平)
Voiced by: Ryōka Yuzuki
The heroine of Ikki Tousen: Eloquent Fist. She is seemingly a member of Seito (wearing the Seito colors), but, like Chousen (who wore Rakuyo colors), she, too, does not have a legitimate school home, and is only interested in the Dragon Potent (though her true desire is towards saving Kanu, which implies that she does have a girl crush on Kanu). She, too, harbors a dragon, which was seen at the end of Chapter One with her going berserk after either Kanu or Hakufu defeat Sousou. Come to find out that Kanpei was possessed by her dragon during those times where she was the enemy intruder, as noted by the end of the Seito chapter where she returns and becomes a legitimate member of Seito (albeit just to bring her closer to the woman she's vowed to protect).

In a mission-mode based storyline, Kanpei winds up running into Chousen, who demands that she fight her, in which Chousen would have won except for the fact that Kanpei (like Ryubi) has absolutely no control over her dragon, thus snapping and easily defeating a weakened Chousen. After this, she vowed to defeat all the people who stand in between her and her precious Kanu, which brought her to Ryubi, whom she is jealous of because Kanu has admiration (and legitimate feelings for) and that Kanpei was rarely noticed by Kanu unless she snapped snap. After Kanpei defeated Ryubi, her dragon seemingly woke up and not only defeated Kanpei, but trashed the Koumei dojo as well. Only when Kanu sacrificed her well-being for Ryubi did Kanpei realize the fate of the two and their relationship. Though Kanpei left dejected because Kanu wanted to be with Ryubi, she did leave with the satisfaction that Kanu was protected by someone with such a strong resolve and thus drops out of sight.

In the Nanyo Arc, Kanpei was merely playing the role of the bad guy to attest the Sho Haō (Hakufu's) true ability and see if she was in fact good enough to face Sousou. After Hakufu won her battle, Kanpei seemingly leaves the Kanto region for a long period of time, attesting that all three schools had amazing potential. After the events of Eloquent Fist, she joins with Chousen in China to train and enjoy the hot springs there. She returns as a playable character in Xross Impact.

Ato (阿斗)
Voiced by: Emiri Katō
Game-exclusive character
The childhood friend of Ryubi Gentoku and the destined "hero" of Kanto, or so she believes. Appearing exclusively in Ikki Tousen: Xross Impact, she is first introduced when a bunch of Nanyo students spot her on top of Nanyo making her bold proclamation that the Battle Range Hunting ("the Second Great Tournament") has commenced and the fate of the region will be determined. Seemingly stupid and childish, Ato would prove that she is actually quite intelligent, and was merely playing a role so that no one would take her seriously, which worked so incredibly well she even fooled Shibai Chuutatsu, who is one of the great revered strategists, along with Ryofu Housen and her follower, Chinkyu Koudai.

During the Nanyo arc, she even manages to convince Ryubi to help her stop the advancing Nanyo fighters from taking over the Seito Theatre (when in reality, Nanyo had no intentions of taking over the Theatre, they were unknowingly going to dispel Shibai's forces there). While Ato and Ryubi lost horribly to Hakufu and Ryomou, Ato learned, just like Kanpei before her, that Nanyo (and more specifically, Hakufu herself) is a true ally to Seito's cause. Her fighting style reflects her spiritual abilities, having her cape being able to transform into a variety of things, such as a priestess-styled kimono, a swimsuit (as evident in one of her super arts), and also the cape can be used to protect herself from potential damage.

During the Seito arc, Ato desired to commence the Battle Range Hunting to become a hero and "save the day". When in reality she was possessed by Demon Shibai just like Ryofu and Chinkyu was until they broke free after Chousen joins the opposing army [either teaming with Kanu or Hakufu]. She also had called out Kanu to see if she was worthy of being with her friend Ryubi but after losing horribly and having to ask for Kanu's forgiveness, she tones down a bit while maintaining her "rivalry" with Kanu and becoming a member of Seito as well.

== Other characters ==
Goei (吳榮)
Voiced by: Kikuko Inoue (Japanese); Wendee Lee (Seasons 1, 3-4), Syndi Szabo (Season 2) (English)
Hakufu's widowed, extremely promiscuous and flirtatious mother. She is a strong fighter and a loving, yet strict mother who is not above getting drunk at parties with her daughter or pummeling her into the floorboards. She unexpectedly moves in with Koukin and Hakufu. While she teases Koukin for his crush on her daughter, she is against the idea of Koukin and Hakufu being in a romantic relationship. She accepts Hakufu's fate and shows no resistance whenever her daughter faces her apparent doom. However, when she found out that Kakouton protected Hakufu from the Ugan gang, she becomes more optimistic about everyone's attempts to change their fates. In the manga she is quite seducing especially when she is under influence of alcohol, in one chapter this even made her flirt with Saji Genpo/Oin Shishi which he surprisingly took as a compliment while the rest of the characters reacted with disgust about this moment. Despite her strong love for her dead husband Sonken Bundai it is a running gag in the series (both in manga and anime) that she often fantasizes about other men and what she could do with them in a sexual manner. Goei is also somewhat perverted which was displayed in one bonus chapter in manga vol 9 where she was asked by Kokin about her favorite bath additives to which she replies with 'men's juice' much to Kokin's disgust.

In the anime, she is depicted as a much stronger fighter, and punishes Hakufu on a regular basis, especially when Hakufu calls her an old hag. These punishments are usually spankings, but can sometimes be something more violent (in one scene, she throws Hakufu through a door). Despite being an inactive fighter, she is still very skillful, as she was able to defeat Tototsu and his Ugan gang after they attack Koukin and Hakufu outside their home. She is attracted to Kakouton, and flirts with him whenever they meet, leading Kakouton's friends to think they are in a relationship. Also, she seems to approve of Koukin's crush on Hakufu more; in the first series, she once took Koukin's pillow, then puts it in Hakufu's bed and encourages him to sleep next to Hakufu, much to his embarrassment.

Bundai Sonken (孫堅 文臺, Sonken Bundai)
Goei's deceased husband and Hakufu's father. He originally had possession of Hakufu's magatama. In the anime, while Hakufu was unconscious after her defeat by Sousou, she met up with her father in a vision. Sonken appeared dressed as a warrior leading an army, and encouraged Hakufu to reach her destiny.

Shikou Chokou (張紘 子綱, Chōkō Shikō)
Voiced by: Jiro Saito (Japanese); William Frederick Knight (English)
An old man who trained Hakufu when she was a child. He is an old friend of Goei, and he possibly trained her too, and has also trained Ukitsu and Rikuson. He explains to Goei about Hakufu's fate to be killed by Ukitsu. When Ukitsu was recovering from her fight with Hakufu, Chokou mentions that her loss to Hakufu was a necessary sacrifice needed to awaken Hakufu's dragon. He is currently trying to teach the Water Dragon Fist to Hakufu with the help of Rikuson and Saji.

In the anime, he is referred by Hakufu as "Grandfather" (it may just be a title, as elderly family friends are called grandfathers in Japan), and he helps train Hakufu and Ryomou at his hot springs. He is also shown to be slightly perverse, as seen during one sparring session when he purposely knocked both Hakufu and Ryomou into a lake just to see them wet. In Dragon Destiny, he is the one who performs a revival on Hakufu's body where he only manages to awaken her dragon, but was able to keep her dragon under control. He tells Ukitsu that only she is able to revive Hakufu's spirit. We find out that he also trained Hakugen. At the end of the series, he and Hakugen are seen attending Ukitsu's grave, and he gives thanks to Ukitsu for sacrificing her life in order to save Hakufu, thus changing the fates of many fighters for the better.

Shifu Choshou (張昭 子布, Chōshō Shifu)
Voiced by: Ayumi Fujimura (Japanese); Caitlin Glass (English)
An old woman with the appearance of a young girl, Choshou is in charge of the Hyakukeitō, a set of 5 legendary Chinese jian made of jewels supposedly made by Cao Cao in ancient China. All five were embedded in a large boulder on Chosho's property and sealed with chi, making them impossible to remove. Totaku was the first person to train under her to obtain the Hyakuhekitou, then Kanu, Ryomou, and Hakufu, with Hakufu the last one to seek training from her. Totaku went berserk in a blind sight of rage after Chosho lectured him about being weak. Hakufu tried to save her but fell unconscious after a jumping from a cliff turning to get to the city faster. Chosho gave Hakufu a gift through a kiss. It is possible that she is dead after giving Hakufu her gift, and it is not yet said what her gift was. Chosho appeared in episode 8 of Great Guardians, where she is seen training Ryomou.

Genka Kada (華佗 元化, Kada Genka)
Voiced by: Yasuyuki Kase (Japanese); Dan Green (Season 2), Josh Grelle (Seasons 3-4) (English)
The talented doctor living near Hakufu's place. He takes care of her many times when she gets injured after battles. He is also responsible for making the talisman-enchanted eyepatches for sealing in Ryomou's dragon.

Tototsu (蹋頓, Tōtotsu)
A fighter from Ugan High School (烏丸高校, Ugan-kōkō), a school named after the Wuhuan, a nomadic people that once inhabited northern China. He was ordered by Sousou to attack Hakufu while she was resting, but was defeated when the others come to help her.

Female Genpou Saji (左慈 元放, Saji Genpō)
Voiced by: Yuki Matsuoka (Japanese); Cristina Vee (English)
Anime-exclusive character
A character who appears exclusively in Ikki Tousen: Great Guardians (and so far is an anime-exclusive character like Chubou), and is the main antagonist of the series. She is first introduced as a mysterious cloaked girl (Red Hood in the English version) with a crystal ball who would often show up and speak to Ryomou, and true identity was not revealed until several episodes later. She is a fighter with a tragic past. As a child, she was shunned by others out of fear or disgust because of her unique powers. She was also frequently bullied and harassed for being different and only one girl (most likely Chubo based on her voice) ever tried to stand up for her, but to no avail. She is capable of using genjutsu, as shown by her revival of Ryofu, and has shown mind-controlling abilities (she controls some of the stronger fighters in the series, most noticeably Ryofu, Ryubi and her friends [excluding Kanu], and even Hakufu herself). However, prolonged use of mind control causes her to suffer great pain. She hates all forms of love and friendship, and goes to great lengths with her powers to break them up, wanting everyone to suffer as she had in the past, believing that obtaining Ryomou's dragon will give her the power to do so. She has a crush on Ouin (the "fake" Saji), believing him to be the only one who understands her.

Kentei (献帝)
Voiced by: Mitsuki Saiga (Japanese); Julie Rei Goldstein (English)
The main antagonist of Ikki Tousen: Xtreme Xecutor. He appeared one day to the leaders of Nanban High and offered his aid in conquering the Kanto area in exchange for swearing allegiance to him. It was Kentei's plan to divide and conquer the Kanto superpowers (Nanyo, Seito, and Kyosho) by luring their most powerful warriors to a fake tournament on Nanban Island while sending assassins to murder the leaders while their defenses were down. He also planned to resurrect thousands of vengeful dead warriors using the blood spilled by the fighters in his captivity. To do this, he manipulated the fighters by focusing on their darkest, most evil emotions. For example, Kentei brought forth within Kanu the raging hatred and need for vengeance the historical Guan Yu felt for Lü Meng in his last moments of life.

Given Kentei's strong ties to the spirits of the deceased, it is likely that Kentei is an undead amalgam of several deceased, yet strong-willed, individuals, including Shibai and the historical Xian Di. Driven purely by ambition, hatred, and vengeance, Kentei will not stop until the entire world falls into anarchy and chaos. Although he would never admit it, Kentei is particularly afraid of those who can conquer destiny, especially Hakufu.

Kentei makes his first appearance outside the anime in volume 18 of the manga (albeit taking the form of a young mature girl). Unlike his anime counterpart, the female Kentei is the other force that is vying to change the fate of the fighters (the other being Shibai who is trying to destroy the world, while Kentei is trying to save it). She appears during Hakufu's fight with the past Sousou, and saved her from a deathblow where she tells her how to save the present Sousou and defeat his past counterpart. Hakufu affectionately refers to her as Ken-chan. She is also the one to reveal that Shibai is not her real name and that her real name is Gifu who happened to be a minor figure in Ancient China, which could explain Shibai's hatred of fighters and why she was luring the Fate dragon into her body. However, Gifu's plot would be stopped when Teni stabbed both herself and Gifu.

Mitsuyoshi Yagyu (柳生 三厳, Yagyu Mitsuyoshi)
Voiced by: Rui Tanabe (Japanese); Jackie Lastra (English)
A third-year student of Daiwa Institute, who came to Kanto alongside other Western warriors to challenge the Fighters. She's also and old acquaintance of Ekitoku, since they went to the same middle school.
She first appears in the Extravaganza Epoch OVA, challenging Chou'un to a sword fight with the intention of taking her Magatama. Confident in her skills, she even wears an eyepatch to give her opponent a leverage. At the end of the fight, when her opponent slices her eyepatch, she realizes that Chou'un was not fighting with her own sword, making her come to respect Shinryu, postponing the duel. Before she can leave, Mitsuyoshi notices that she forgot her wallet, and ends up asking Chou'un for money. She's invited by Chou'un to Seito and reveals that Himiko sent them to take as many Magatamas as possible, but unaware of her endgame. She ends up fighting alongside Ekitoku against Inshun to pay an old favor, only to be poisoned by the monk.

Inshun Hōzōin (宝蔵院 胤栄, Hozoin Inshuu)
Voiced by: Hideo Ishikawa (Japanese); Leonardo Rossi (English)
A very powerful monk who was sent to collect as many Magatamas as possible, branding his defeated opponents with the seal of his clan. He targets Seito and fights Ekitoku and Mitsuyoshi, defeating both of them using a poisonous technique to immobilize them. Even Gentoku's Dragon was useless to defeat him, but before he could brand her, he was stopped by Kan'u. Despite being injured, he eventually overpowered his enemy.
Born with his current S-Rank, Gentoku showed him his memories and how because he was always told he was powerful and different, he became alienated from his peers, eventually becoming ruthless, depraved and obsessed with power. When Kan'u recovered her strength and ascended to S-rank, she confronted him on how deep down, he simply wanted companions. Despite being overpowered and with his weapon broken, Inshun refused to give up, until he was brought down by Unchou.

Benkei Musashibou (武蔵坊 弁慶, Musashibou Benkei)
Voiced by: Yōko Hikasa (Japanese); Hayden Daviau (English)
A second year student of Yamashiro Academy who debuts in the anime during Extravaganza Epoch OVA, sent to attack Kyosho alongside Yoshitsune under orders from Himiko. She fights Chuukou until she cannot move anymore, but before she can finish her, she realizes that all the other students are willing to put their lives on the line to protect Sousou, expressing envy towards their bonds.

Yoshitsune Minamoto no Kurō (源 義経, Minamoto no Yoshitsune)
Voiced by: Yuiko Tatsumi (Japanese); Kira Buckland (English)
Another student of Yamashiro Academy who debuts in the anime during the Extravaganza Epoch OVA, who attacks Sousou while Benkei distracts the other students. She uses a very long katana and slices Sousou's eyes before he can react. She keeps taunting her opponent until Sousou learns to read her movements, defeating her despite being blinded. She's picked up by Benkei, but ended achieving her objective, stealing Sousou's Magatama.

Himiko (卑弥呼, Himiko)
Voiced by: Chiaki Takahashi (Japanese); Harley Lainey (English)
The mysterious leader of Yamashiro academy, who came to the east alongside several other warriors in order to gather as many Magatamas as possible for an unknown purpose. She sent several fighters to attack Hakufu and when she was distracted, she knocked her out with a kiss and took her Magatama. At the end of the OVA she was seen with Yoshitsune and Benkei atop a building, with Sousou and Hakufu's Magatamas in her hands.
