= Scott Kinworthy =

American actor (born 1974)

Scott Kinworthy (born 1974) is an American actor. He was best known for his short-lived role as Josh Madden on All My Children from June 17, 2005, until September 15, 2005.

He has since had a small role in the 2003 film House of Sand and Fog, which starred Jennifer Connelly and Ben Kingsley. In 2005, he had a small role in the 2005 film Serenity. In 2008 he co-starred with Benny Ciaramello and Erica Shaffer in The Fall.

He also played Bruce Wayne in Nightwing: The Series on YouTube.

On the stage, he has appeared in the off-Broadway production of Blue Man Group in New York City and Las Vegas.
