= The Elevator (1974 film) =

- Title card
- Genre: Drama; Thriller
- Written by: David Ketchum; Bruce Sheeley
- Directed by: Jerry Jameson
- Starring: James Farentino; Roddy McDowall; Craig Stevens; Teresa Wright; Myrna Loy; Carol Lynley; Arlene Golonka; Don Stroud
- Music by: John Cacavas
- Country of origin: United States
- Original language: English

Production
- Producer: William Frye
- Production locations: Universal Studios - 100 Universal City Plaza, Universal City, California
- Cinematography: Matthew F. Leonetti
- Editors: Philip Haberman; J. Terry Williams
- Running time: 75 min.
- Production company: Universal Television

Original release
- Network: ABC
- Release: February 9, 1974

The Elevator is a television thriller film that first aired on February 9, 1974 as an ABC Movie of the Week.

== Plot ==
An elevator carrying a diverse group of people and stuck between floors in a high-rise office building. The tension inside the stalled elevator is exacerbated by one passenger: a claustrophobic armed robber trying to flee from his latest hit.

== Main cast ==
Actor	Role
James Farentino	Eddie Holcomb
Roddy McDowall	Marvin Ellis
Craig Stevens	Dr. Reynolds
Don Stroud	Pete Howarth
Myrna Loy	Mrs. Kenyon
Teresa Wright	Edith Reynolds
Carol Lynley	Irene Turner
Arlene Golonka	Wendy Thompson
Barry Livingston	Robert Peters

== Production ==
The film was made for the ABC Suspense Movie of the Week. It was shot at the Crocker Bank Building in downtown Los Angeles in November, 1973.

== Reception ==
The Los Angeles Times called it a "witty and suspenseful diversion".
