= Arlene Golonka =

American actress (1936–2021)

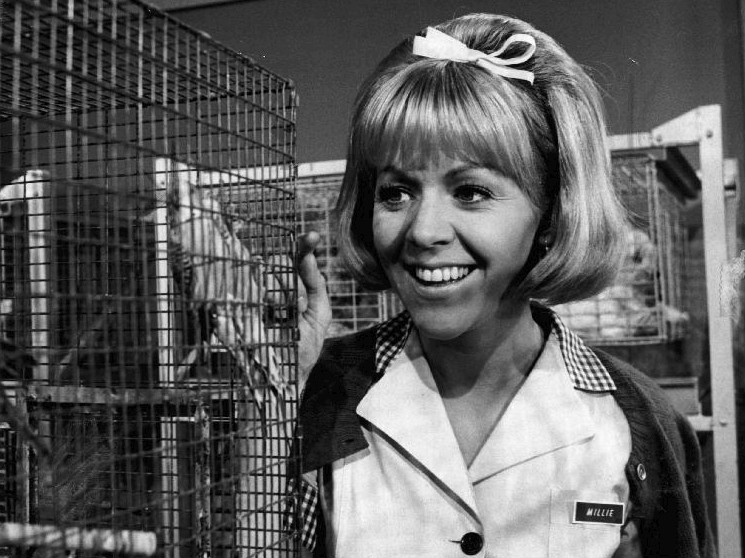
- Golonka on Mayberry R.F.D. in 1969
- Born: Arlene Leanore Golonka; January 23, 1936; Chicago, Illinois, U.S.
- Died: May 31, 2021 (aged 85); West Hollywood, California, U.S.
- Occupation: Actress
- Years active: 1958–2005
- Known for: The Andy Griffith Show; Mayberry R.F.D.; Speed Buggy
- Spouses: Christopher Michael Haenel (m. 19??; div. 19??); Mike Longo (m. 1963; div. 1967) Larry Delaney (m. 1969; div. 1977)

Arlene Leanore Golonka (January 23, 1936 – May 31, 2021) was an American actress. She is known for playing Millie Hutchins on the television comedy The Andy Griffith Show and Millie Swanson on Mayberry R.F.D., and often portrayed bubbly, eccentric blondes in supporting character roles on stage, film, and television.

== Early years ==
Golonka was born in Chicago on January 23, 1936, the daughter of Elinor (née Wroblewski) and Frank Golonka, of Polish descent, She worked as a waitress and began her acting career in her early teens, going professional in a summer-stock troupe.

== Career ==
A life member of The Actors Studio, she appeared in her first major production, The Night Circus, with Ben Gazzara, at the Shubert Theater in New Haven, Connecticut on November 17, 1958. After a week-long trial run, the play moved to Broadway on December 2, 1958, but closed after only seven performances.

Despite that setback, she continued working in other plays such as Take Me Along with Jackie Gleason, Walter Pidgeon and Robert Morse (448 performances from late 1959 to late 1960), Neil Simon's first Broadway play, Come Blow Your Horn, which ran 677 performances from February 1961 until October 1962, and One Flew Over the Cuckoo's Nest, starring Kirk Douglas, from November 1963 until January 1964. Golonka appeared in two other Broadway plays from 1965 to 1966, and took supporting roles in films produced in the New York City area.

Golonka also recorded a comedy album, You Don't Have to Be Jewish on June 14, 1964. When the time came to record its sequel, When You're in Love the Whole World Is Jewish, she was unavailable, but encouraged her roommate, aspiring actress Valerie Harper, to audition to take her place.

In 1967, Golonka moved to Los Angeles to try her hand at television. She made numerous TV appearances on such series as Car 54, Where Are You?; Get Smart; Barnaby Jones; The Flying Nun; I Spy; That Girl; The Mary Tyler Moore Show; M*A*S*H; All in the Family; Cannon; Maude; The Andy Griffith Show; Mayberry R.F.D.; Alice; The Rockford Files; The Streets of San Francisco; One Day at a Time; The San Pedro Beach Bums; Taxi; $weepstake$; Murder, She Wrote; The King of Queens; Valerie; Sunset Beat; and Matlock; among others.

In 1992, Golonka appeared as Sally Nash in the 13th episode "Fool for Love" in season 5 of the television series In the Heat of the Night with Carroll O'Connor. In this episode she played the other woman to a philandering Dr. Vance Talbot (played by actor Robert Ginty) who tries to frame her for the murder of his wife before murdering Nash as well. Golonka was a regular on the animated cartoon Speed Buggy, providing the voice of "Debbie", and had a recurring role on the short-lived TV series Joe & Valerie. She performed voices in other animated series including The New Yogi Bear Show, Capitol Critters, Yogi's Treasure Hunt, and The New Scooby-Doo Movies.

Golonka had supporting roles in some 30 films, including Harvey Middleman, Fireman (1965), Penelope (1966), The Busy Body (1967), Welcome to Hard Times (1967), Hang 'Em High (1968), The Elevator (1974), Airport '77 (1977), The In-Laws (1979), Love At First Bite (1980), The Last Married Couple in America (1980), My Tutor (1983), The End of Innocence (1990), and A Family Affair (2001).

Golonka performed in a number of productions for the West Coast Jewish Theatre.

== Personal life ==
Golonka was married and divorced three times. Her first husband was Christopher Michael Haenel. In 1962, she married jazz pianist and composer Mike Longo, and they divorced in 1967. She wed actor Larry Delaney, who appeared with her in one episode of Mayberry R.F.D., in 1969, and they divorced in 1977.

== Death ==
Golonka died due to complications from Alzheimer's disease in West Hollywood, California on May 31, 2021, at age 85.

== Filmography ==
- 1963: Car 54, Where Are You? as Laverne Montaine, Season 2, Episode 16
- 1963: Love with the Proper Stranger as Marge (uncredited)
- 1964: Diary of a Bachelor as Lois
- 1965: Harvey Middleman, Fireman as Harriet
- 1966: Penelope as Honeysuckle Rose
- 1967: The Busy Body as Bobbi Brody
- 1967: Welcome to Hard Times as Mae
- 1967: The Flying Nun as Dottie, Season 1, Episode 3
- 1967: The Big Valley as Gail Miller, Season 3, Episode 10–11
- 1967: The Andy Griffith Show as Millie Hutchins (2 episodes)
- 1967–1968: That Girl (3 episodes)
- 1968: Get Smart as Zelda, Season 3, Episode 16–17
- 1968: I Spy as Melanie, Season 3, Episode 26
- 1968: Hang 'Em High as Jennifer
- 1968–1971: Mayberry R.F.D. as Millie Hutchins-Swanson (49 episodes)
- 1971–1974: The Mary Tyler Moore Show (2 episodes)
- 1972: M*A*S*H as Lt. Edwina “Eddie” Ferguson, Season 1, Episode 13
- 1972: The Rookies as Store Clerk
- 1973: Speed Buggy as Debbie (voice)
- 1973–1975: Barnaby Jones (2 episodes)
- 1973: All in the Family as Tina, Season 3, Episode 16
- 1973: Cannon as Melissa "BJ" Franklin, Season 2, Episode 15
- 1974–1975: Maude (2 episodes)
- 1974: The Elevator as Wendy Thompson
- 1974: Police Woman as Carolee English, Season 1, Episode 12
- 1975: The Secret Night Caller as Charlotte
- 1975–1976: The Streets of San Francisco (2 episodes)
- 1977: Airport '77 as Mrs. Jane Stern
- 1977: Alice as Shirley Bartlett, Season 1, Episode 19
- 1978: The Rockford Files as Jeanne Rosenthal, Season 4 Episode 15
- 1978: One Day at a Time as Joyce Emerson, Season 4, Episode 3
- 1978: Taxi as Sheila, Season 1, Episode 7
- 1979: The In-Laws as Jean Ricardo
- 1979–1982: The Love Boat (2 episodes)
- 1979–1982: Fantasy Island (3 episodes)
- 1980: The Last Married Couple in America as Sally Cooper
- 1981: Longshot as Evelyn Gripp
- 1981: Separate Ways as Annie Donahue
- 1982–1983: Gimme a Break! as Maxine (2 episodes)
- 1983: Simon & Simon as Joyce Allreed, Season 3, Episode 5
- 1983: Benson as Betty Braxton, Season 5, Episode 11
- 1983: My Tutor as Mrs. Chrystal
- 1986: Foxtrap as Emily
- 1986: Detective School Dropouts (uncredited)
- 1986–1990: Murder, She Wrote (2 episodes)
- 1987: Valerie as Darlene Franklin, Season 2, Episode 22
- 1987: Survival Game as Barbara Hawkins
- 1988–1990: Growing Pains (2 episodes)
- 1989: Dr. Alien as Mom
- 1989: Trained to Kill as Martha Cooper
- 1990: The Gumshoe Kid as Gracie Sherman
- 1990: The End of Innocence as Claire
- 1991–1993: Matlock (2 episodes)
- 1992: In The Heat of The Night as Sally Nash, Season 5, Episode 13
- 1993: Amore! as Acting Coach
- 1995: Cops n Roberts
- 1997: Leather Jacket Love Story as Mom
- 2001: A Family Affair as Leah Rosen
- 2005: The King of Queens as Annette, Season 8, Episode 7
