= The Fall (2008 film) =

- Directed by: John Krueger
- Written by: John Krueger
- Produced by: Marcienne Friesland, John Krueger
- Starring: Benjamin Ciaramello, Scott Kinworthy, Erica Shaffer
- Cinematography: Marco Cappetta
- Music by: Max and Richard Druz
- Production companies: Dangerous Wounded Animals, Kenneth Kemp Productions
- Distributed by: Osiris Entertainment
- Release dates: September 6, 2008 (Rome Film Festival); October 30, 2009 (United States)
- Running time: 110 minutes
- Country: United States
- Language: English
- Budget: $500,000 (estimated)

The Fall is a 2008 independent crime film written and directed by John Krueger, starring Benjamin Ciaramello, Scott Kinworthy, and Erica Shaffer.

== Plot ==
Two brothers, Tony (Benny Ciaramello and Robert Gerdisch as young Tony) and Frank "Butchie" Jakubiak (Scott Kinworthy and Matthew Gold as young Butchie), are forced to face a terrible and hidden crime that comes from their past.

== Cast ==
Actor/Actress	Role
Benny Ciaramello	Tony Jakubiak
Peter Cilella	Erik Masters
William Devane	Judge Stanley Seeban
Jason Durdon	Subpoena Cop
Priscilla Garita	Reporter
Rosemary Garris	Reporter
Robert Gerdisch	Young Tony
Matthew Gold	Young Butchie
Carolyn Hoerdermann	Officer Hamm
Steven Jeffrey Holden	Officer Steve
Scott Kinworthy	Frank Jakubiak
Mildred Lombardi	Edna
Erica Shaffer	Mery Beth, Tony's wife

== Production ==
The Fall was filmed in Los Angeles and Milwaukee.

== Release ==
The Fall premiered at the Rome Film Festival in September 2008.

== Home media ==
The film has been released in DVD format for home entertainment in 2010, distributed by Osiris Entertainment for the United States and Peacock Films for Australia.
