= A Family Affair (2001 film) =

2001 lesbian romantic comedy film by Helen Lesnick

- Directed by: Helen Lesnick
- Written by: Helen Lesnick
- Produced by: Valerie Pichney
- Starring: Helen Lesnick; Erica Shaffer; Arlene Golonka; Barbara Stuart; Michele Greene; Suzanne Westenhoefer
- Cinematography: Jim Orr
- Music by: Danny De La Isla; Kelly Neill; Robert Westlind
- Production company: Atta Girl Productions
- Distributed by: Wolfe Video
- Release date: 2001
- Running time: 107 min
- Country: United States
- Language: English

A Family Affair is a 2001 lesbian romantic comedy directed by Helen Lesnick. The director followed the film up with Inescapable in 2003.

== Plot ==
Rachel Rosen (Helen Lesnick) moves back to California after breaking up with her girlfriend Reggie Abravanel (Michele Greene) who she had been with for the past 13 years. After a string of unsuccessful new relationships Rachel agrees to let her mother Leah Rosen (Arlene Golonka) set her up on a blind date with Christine Peterson (Erica Shaffer). Their relationship is a success and a year later they decide to get married. Then a few days before the wedding Reggie comes to California to find Rachel, hoping to get back together...

== Cast ==
- Helen Lesnick as Rachel Rosen
- Erica Shaffer as Christine Peterson
- Arlene Golonka as Leah Rosen
- Barbara Stuart as Sylvia Peterson
- Michele Greene as Reggie Abravanel
- Suzanne Westenhoefer as Carol Rosen
- Michael Moerman as Sam Rosen
- David Radford as Joe
- Don Loper as Matthew Rosen
- Keith E. Wright as Rob
- Mark DeWhitt as Danny
- Tracy Hughes as Nancy
- Joel Hepner as Stanley Peterson
- Suzana Norberg as Kathi
- Michael McGee as Barry
- Jack Silbaugh as Steve
- Kelly Neill as Debi
- Ellen Lawler as Suzi
- Suzi Miller as Teri

== Production ==
The film is set in San Diego. It premiered at the Outfest San Diego film festival in 2001.

== Reception ==
Kevin Thomas at the Los Angeles Times said "Lesnick knows how to build her characters from within, and as a result this gentle film delivers an emotional wallop all the more potent for being unexpected." Ella Taylor at LA Weekly said "The pacing never accelerates beyond sluggish, and Lesnick’s script is an awkward pile of gag lines." C.W. Nevius at SFGATE said it has "a sweet finish that saves this as a good old-fashioned love story." Connie Ogle at Miami Herald said "Lesnick's vision of tolerance is a soothing thought."
