= Hiroe Oka =

Japanese actress and voice actress (born 1971)

Hiroe Oka (岡寛恵, Oka Hiroe; born June 8, 1971) is a Japanese actress and voice actress from Tokyo. She is affiliated with the Bungaku Company. She is the official Japanese voice-dubbing artist for Kate Winslet, Gwyneth Paltrow, Kirsten Dunst and others. She is also the official Japanese dubbing roles for Milla Jovovich with TV editions in early days.

== Filmography ==
=== Television animation ===
- Ikki Tousen (Chinkyū Kōdai)
- Marvel Anime: Iron Man (Pepper Potts)

=== Theatrical animation ===
- Psycho-Pass: Sinners of the System (Kyōka Tsujichō)

=== Video games ===
- Dark Cloud 2 (Elena)
- Glass Rose (Tsuysko Sawamatsu)

=== Dubbing roles ===
- Gwyneth Paltrow
  - The Anniversary Party (Skye Davidson)
  - Iron Man (Pepper Potts)
  - Iron Man 2 (Pepper Potts)
  - The Avengers (Pepper Potts)
  - Iron Man 3 (Pepper Potts)
  - Mortdecai (Johanna Mortdecai)
  - Spider-Man: Homecoming (Pepper Potts)
  - Avengers: Infinity War (Pepper Potts)
- Kate Winslet
  - Titanic (2004 Fuji TV edition) (Rose DeWitt Bukater)
  - Finding Neverland (J.M. Barrie)
  - All the King's Men (Anne Stanton)
  - Little Children (Sarah Pierce)
  - The Reader (Hanna Schmitz)
  - Carnage (Nancy Cowan)
  - Divergent (Jeanine Matthews)
- Christina Hendricks
  - ER (Joyce Westlake)
  - Mad Men (Joan Holloway)
  - Life as We Know It (Alison Novak)
  - I Don't Know How She Does It (Allison Henderson)
- Diane Kruger
  - Troy (2007 TV Asahi edition) (Helen)
  - Copying Beethoven (Anna Holtz)
  - Forces spéciales (Elsa Casanova)
  - Unknown (Gina)
- 27 Dresses (Jane Nichols (Katherine Heigl))
- 8 Women (Catherine (Ludivine Sagnier))
- The A-Team (Charissa Sosa (Jessica Biel))
- Australia (Lady Sarah Ashley (Nicole Kidman))
- Baby Mama (Kate Holbrook (Tina Fey))
- The Big Wedding (Lyla Griffin (Katherine Heigl))
- Birdman (Lesley Truman (Naomi Watts))
- The Black Dahlia (Elizabeth Short (Mia Kirshner))
- Blade Runner: The Final Cut (Rachael (Sean Young))
- Broken Embraces (Magdalena "Lena" Rivas (Penélope Cruz))
- Casanova (Francesca Bruni (Sienna Miller))
- Casino Royale (Vesper Lynd (Eva Green))
- The Change-Up (Sabrina McKay (Olivia Wilde))
- Chicago Joe and the Showgirl (2009 DVD edition) (Joyce Cook (Patsy Kensit))
- Click (Donna Newman (Kate Beckinsale))
- Cliffhanger (2014 BS Japan edition) (Jessie Deighan (Janine Turner))
- Constantine (2008 TV Asahi edition) (Angela Dodson (Rachel Weisz))
- Cruel Intentions 3 (Cassidy Merteuil (Kristina Anapau))
- Daredevil (Elektra Natchios (Jennifer Garner))
- The Dark Knight (2012 TV Asahi edition) (Rachel Dawes (Maggie Gyllenhaal))
- Diamonds Are Forever (2006 DVD/Blu-Ray edition) (Tiffany Case (Jill St. John))
- The Diving Bell and the Butterfly (Henriette Durand (Marie-Josée Croze))
- Dream House (Ann Patterson (Naomi Watts))
- Elektra (Elektra (Jennifer Garner))
- Exorcist: The Beginning (Sarah (Izabella Scorupco))
- The Extraordinary Adventures of Adèle Blanc-Sec (Adèle Blanc-Sec (Louise Bourgoin))
- Felon (Laura Porter (Marisol Nichols))
- The Following (Claire Matthews (Natalie Zea))
- Freddy vs. Jason (Lori Campbell (Monica Keena))
- Gilmore Girls (Lorelai Gilmore (Lauren Graham))
- The Guardian (Emily Thomas (Melissa Sagemiller))
- The Happening (Alma Moore (Zooey Deschanel))
- Hitman (Nika Boronina (Olga Kurylenko))
- Home Sweet Hell (Mona Champagne (Katherine Heigl))
- I'm Sorry, I Love You (Moon Ji-young (Choi Yeo-jin))
- I, Robot (television edition) (Doctor Susan Calvin (Bridget Moynahan))
- Identity (Paris Nevada (Amanda Peet))
- Igby Goes Down (Rachel (Amanda Peet))
- Imagine Me & You (Luce (Lena Headey))
- The Impossible (Maria Bennett (Naomi Watts))
- The International (Eleanor Whitman (Naomi Watts))
- Interstellar (Murphy (Jessica Chastain))
- The Italian Job (Stella Bridger (Charlize Theron))
- Joint Security Area (Major Sophie E. Jean (Lee Young-ae))
- Juno (Vanessa Loring (Jennifer Garner))
- Knowing (Diana Wayland (Rose Byrne))
- Lake Placid: The Final Chapter (Sheriff Theresa Glove (Elisabeth Röhm))
- Lord of War (Ava Fontaine (Bridget Moynahan))
- Max Payne (Natasha Sax (Olga Kurylenko))
- Mission: Impossible III (Julia Meade (Michelle Monaghan))
- Neighbors 2: Sorority Rising (Kelly Radner (Rose Byrne))
- The Net 2.0 (Hope Cassidy (Nikki DeLoach))
- Night Watch (Svetlana (Mariya Poroshina))
- Noah (Naameh (Jennifer Connelly))
- Nowhere Boy (Julia Lennon (Anne-Marie Duff))
- Oblivion (Victoria "Vika" Olsen (Andrea Riseborough))
- Old Dogs (Vicki Greer (Kelly Preston))
- Out for a Kill (Tommie Ling (Michelle Goh))
- The Pianist (Dorota (Emilia Fox))
- The Private Lives of Pippa Lee (Sandra Dulles (Winona Ryder))
- The Purge: Election Year (Charlene "Charlie" Roan (Elizabeth Mitchell))
- Purple Noon (2008 TV Tokyo edition) (Marge Duval (Marie Laforêt))
- Ra.One (Sonia (Kareena Kapoor))
- Ray (Della Bea Robinson (Kerry Washington))
- Red Cliff (Xiao Qiao (Lin Chi-ling))
- Reign of Fire (Alex Jensen (Izabella Scorupco))
- Reservation Road (Ruth Wheldon (Mira Sorvino))
- Resident Evil series (TV editions) (Alice (Milla Jovovich))
- Resident Evil: Extinction (Claire Redfield (Ali Larter))
- Resident Evil: Afterlife (Claire Redfield (Ali Larter))
- Resident Evil: The Final Chapter (Claire Redfield (Ali Larter))
- Rush Hour 3 (Geneviève (Noémie Lenoir))
- Saw II (Addison (Emmanuelle Vaugier))
- Scarface (2004 DVD edition) (Gina Montana (Mary Elizabeth Mastrantonio))
- SEAL Team 8: Behind Enemy Lines (Zoe Jelani (Aurélie Meriel))
- Shoot 'Em Up (Donna Quintano (Monica Bellucci))
- Skyfall (Sévérine (Bérénice Marlohe))
- Spider-Man (Mary Jane Watson (Kirsten Dunst))
- Spider-Man 2 (Mary Jane Watson (Kirsten Dunst))
- Spider-Man 3 (Mary Jane Watson (Kirsten Dunst))
- The Spirit (Lorelei Rox (Jaime King))
- Star Trek: Enterprise (Hoshi Sato (Linda Park))
- Sympathy for Lady Vengeance (Lee Geum-ja (Lee Young-ae))
- Terminator 3: Rise of the Machines (T-X (Kristanna Loken))
- Tomcats (Officer Natalie Parker (Shannon Elizabeth))
- Torque (Shane (Monet Mazur))
- Total Recall (Lori Quaid (Kate Beckinsale))
- Touching Evil (Detective Susan Branca (Vera Farmiga))
- Transporter 2 (Audrey Billings (Amber Valletta))
- Triangle (Jess (Melissa George))
- Two Weeks Notice (June Carver (Alicia Witt))
- Superman (Lois Lane (Margot Kidder))
- UC: Undercover (Alex Cross (Vera Farmiga))
- Vantage Point (Veronica (Ayelet Zurer))
- While We're Young (Cornelia Schrebnick (Naomi Watts))
