= Erica Shaffer =

American actress (born 1970)

- Years active: 1992–present
- Website: http://www.ericashaffer.com/

Erica Shaffer is an American actress who has worked in independent films and television.

Her film appearances include A Family Affair, The Truth is Always Complicated, The Fall, Catalina Trust, The Socratic Method, Three on a Match and West Coast.

Shaffer's television credits include guest star and recurring roles on Days of Our Lives, Valentine, Eleventh Hour, The Secret Life of the American Teenager, CSI Miami, Las Vegas, The King of Queens, Windfall, The Young and the Restless, Charmed, Mind of Mencia, Clubhouse, Fight for Fame, Silk Stalkings, Veronica's Closet, Night Man and Pensacola: Wings of Gold. She has hosted shows such as Vacation Challenge on the Travel Channel and Cafe Sound on Access Entertainment Network.

Shaffer has been in more than 200 commercials and has also been the host of the web series Personal Injury Network.

Shaffer is a voice over artist for animation and has voiced many characters, including the lead heroines and villains in Pioneer LDC's Nazca, I My Me! Strawberry Eggs, Paranoia Agent and Amazing Nurse Nanako. She has also done voiceovers for radio commercials as well as documentaries for The Learning Channel and The History Channel.

Roles from Shaffer's theater career at the Laguna Playhouse include, "Ruth" from Harvey, starring Charles Durning. Other favorite roles in theater include "Portia" from The Merchant of Venice, "Myrhhine", from Lysistrata, "Joanne" from Come Back to the 5 & Dime, Jimmy Dean, Jimmy Dean and "Rose of Sharon" from The Grapes of Wrath. In San Diego Shaffer played "Hyacinth" in Scapan directed by William Ball.

She is a member of the Screen Actors Guild (SAG), the American Federation of Television and Radio Artists (AFTRA) and Actors' Equity Association. (AEA)

Shaffer is a private speech and acting coach with her own practice on the west side of Los Angeles.

== Filmography ==
Year	Title	Role	Other notes
1992	Spirit of Wonder: China-san no yûutsu	Lily	voice: English version
1999	Three on a Match		
1999	Little Heroes	Ms Bakman	
1999	Catalina Trust	Kitty	
2000	West Coast	Julie	
2001	The Socratic Method	Susan Walsh	
2004	The Kids Who Saved Summer	Penny	voice
2004	SpellForce: Shadow of the Phoenix		voice: English version
2006	Cattle Call	Computer Dating Woman #3	
2007	Two-Eleven	Elizabeth Summerfeild	
2008	The Fall	Brooke Jakubiak	completed
2008	The B.A.M.N. Squad		post-production
2010	Puppet Master: Axis of Evil	Elma Coogan	
2012	Detention (2011 film)	Slone	

== Anime ==
- Nazca (1998): Yuka Kiritake/Aquira
- Amazing Nurse Nanako (1999): Satsuki
- I My Me! Strawberry Eggs (2001): Vice Principal
- Texhnolyze (2003): Promoter's Lover
- Ikki tôsen (2003): Kanu Uncho
- R.O.D the TV (2003): Cabin Attendant/Tachibana Reporter
- Mermaid Forest (2003): Hazuki's Mother
- Licensed by Royalty (2003): Cynthia
- Môsô dairinin (2004): Harumi Chono/Maria
- Ergo Proxy (2006): Quinn, Entourage

== Television ==
- Night Man (1998)
- Hang Time (1999)
- 18 Wheels of Justice (1 episode, 2000)
- The King of Queens (1 episode, 2005)
- Charmed (1 episode, 2005)
- Drake & Josh (1 episode, 2005)
- The Young and the Restless (2 episodes, 2004–2005)
- Las Vegas (1 episode, 2006)
- Windfall (1 episode, 2006)
- CSI: Miami (1 episode, 2007)
- Private Practice (1 episode, 2010)
- Scandal (38 episodes, 2012–2018)
- Castle (1 episode, 2013)

== TV commercials ==
- Mercury Auto Insurance
- Shoe Pavilion
- 3-day Blinds
- StressEez (2006)
- Time Life 70s Music Explosion (2005)
- WD-40 (2006)
- Mighty Key (2007)
- Miracle-Gro (2006–07)
- Chase (2007)
- Pizza Hut (2007)
- Shur-Line (2008)
- KY Warming Gel (2006–08)
- Sargento (2008)
- Walmart (2009)
- Mattress Warehouse (2009)
- Shake Weight
- 3M Command Hooks (2010)
- Burger King (2010)
- East Side Mario's (2011)
- Sunsweet Prunes (2011)
- Fidelity Investments (2012)
- LG Electronics (2012)
- Scotties Tissues (2013)
- Chrysler (2014)
- KFC (2015)
- 7-up (2017)
- Direct Energy (2017)
- San Antonio Tourism (2017)
- Spectrum Business Internet (2018)
- Ilumya (2019)
- Wayfair (2019)
- Gain laundry detergent (2020)
- Abreva Commercial (2020)
- Ozempic (2022)
- Skechers (2022)
- AdoptUSKids.org (PSA, 2023)
- Craftsman (2024)
- Dignity Memorial (2024)

== Infomercials ==
- 70s Music Explosion (2005)
- Bowflex TreadClimber (2006)
- BetterTrades (2007)
- Kiyoseki Pro (2007)
- Cobra Stunlight (2007)
- Nutrisystem for Men (2007)
- Luminess Air (2007)
- Ultreo (2007)
- KY (2006)
- Billboards 70s (2009)
- Ninja (2010)
- Food Saver System (2011)
