= Fight for Fame =

2005 American television series

Fight for Fame is a one-hour reality show produced by E! Entertainment Television, and producers Jay James, Tim Puntillo, Alan Blassberg, and Brian Lando, directed by Hans van Riet. A long established talent agency - Acme Talent & Literary - provides two top agents, Adam Lieblein (President) and Greg Meyer to add focus to the show, without being seen as "hosts." Each hour shows five actors vying for the opportunity to sign with Adam and Greg at the agency. They are put through four sets of audition challenges, including monologues, improvisation, and scripted auditions in front of well-known Hollywood directors, casting executives and executive producers. At the end of each episode, one actor signs with Acme Talent & Literary. The audience gets to see the decision process of the agents, as well as the attitude of talented and not-so-talented actors.

Ten episodes were ordered and shot in 2005, and no additional order has been placed. Episodes began airing on June 5, 2005, and continue every Sunday evening at 10PM for ten weeks. Each episode is also re-run numerous times each week at different hours. The initial ten episodes continued to air in countries outside the United States through the end of 2007.
