= Cao Cao =

Chinese warlord and statesman (155–220)

Cao Cao 曹操
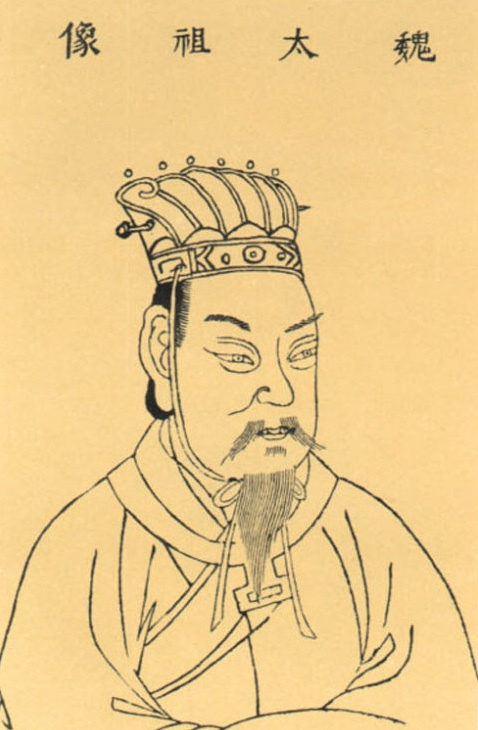
- A Ming dynasty illustration of Cao Cao in the Sancai Tuhui.

King of Wei
- Tenure: 216 – 15 March 220
- Successor: Cao Pi

Duke of Wei
- Tenure: 213–216

Imperial Chancellor
- In office 208 – 15 March 220
- Monarch: Emperor Xian
- Succeeded by: Cao Pi

Minister of Works
- In office 196–208
- Monarch: Emperor Xian
- Born: c. 155; Qiao County, Pei state, Han dynasty
- Died: 15 March 220 (aged 64–65); Luoyang
- Burial: 11 April 220; Cao Cao Mausoleum
- Spouse: Lady Ding; Lady Bian
- Issue (among others): Cao Ang, Prince Min of Feng; Cao Pi, Emperor Wen of Wei; Cao Zhi, Prince Si of Chen; Cao Zhang, Prince Wei of Rencheng; Cao Jie, Empress Xianmu of Han; 26 others
Names
- Family name: Cao (曹); Given name: Cao (操); Courtesy name: Mengde (孟德)
Posthumous name
- Prince Wu (武王) (by Eastern Han); Emperor Wu (武皇帝) (by Cao Wei)
Temple name
- Taizu (太祖)
- Father: Cao Song
- Mother: Lady Ding

Cao Cao
- Chinese: 曹操
- Hanyu Pinyin: Cáo Cāo
Transcriptions
Standard Mandarin
- Hanyu Pinyin: Cáo Cāo
- Gwoyeu Romatzyh: Tsaur Tsau
- Wade–Giles: Tsʻao^{2} Tsʻao^{1}
- Yale Romanization: Tsáu Tsāu
- IPA: [tsʰǎʊ tsʰáʊ]
Wu
- Suzhounese: Zau^{2} Tshau^{1}
Yue: Cantonese
- Yale Romanization: Chòuh Chōu
- Jyutping: Cou4 Cou1
- IPA: [tsʰɔw˩ tsʰɔw˥]
Southern Min
- Hokkien POJ: Chô Chhò
- Tâi-lô: Tsô Tshau
Middle Chinese
- Middle Chinese: /d͡zɑu t͡sʰɑu/

Cao Cao ([tsʰǎʊ tsʰáʊ]; Chinese: 曹操; c. 155 – 15 March 220), courtesy name Mengde, was a Chinese statesman, warlord, and poet who rose to power during the end of the Han dynasty (c. 184–220 AD), ultimately taking effective control of the Han central government. He laid the foundation for the state of Cao Wei (220–265 AD), established by his son and successor Cao Pi, who ended the Eastern Han dynasty and inaugurated the Three Kingdoms period (220–280 AD). Beginning in his own lifetime, a corpus of legends developed around Cao Cao which built upon his talent, his cruelty, and his perceived eccentricities.

Cao Cao began his career as an official under the Han government and held various appointments including that of a district security chief in the capital and the chancellor of a principality. He rose to prominence in the 190s during which he recruited his own followers, formed his own army, and set up a base in Yan Province (covering parts of present-day Henan and Shandong). In 196 AD, he received Emperor Xian, the figurehead Han sovereign who was previously held hostage by other warlords such as Dong Zhuo, Li Jue, and Guo Si. After he established the new imperial capital in Xuchang, Emperor Xian and the central government came under his direct control, but he still paid nominal allegiance to the emperor. Throughout the 190s, Cao Cao actively waged wars in central China against rival warlords such as Lü Bu, Yuan Shu, and Zhang Xiu, eliminating all of them. Following his triumph over the warlord Yuan Shao at the Battle of Guandu in 200 AD, Cao Cao launched a series of campaigns against Yuan Shao's sons and allies over the following seven years, defeated them, and unified much of northern China under his control. In 208 AD, shortly after Emperor Xian appointed him as the Imperial Chancellor, he embarked on an expedition to gain a foothold in southern China, but was defeated by the allied forces of the warlords Sun Quan, Liu Bei, and Liu Qi at the decisive Battle of Red Cliffs.

His subsequent attempts over the following years to annex the lands south of the Yangtze River never proved successful. In 211 AD, he defeated a coalition of northwestern warlords led by Ma Chao and Han Sui at the Battle of Tong Pass. Five years later, he seized Hanzhong from the warlord Zhang Lu, but lost it to Liu Bei by 219. In the meantime, he also received many honours from Emperor Xian. In 213 AD, he was created Duke of Wei and granted a fief covering parts of present-day Hebei and Henan. In 216 AD, he was elevated to the status of a vassal king under the title "King of Wei" and awarded numerous ceremonial privileges, of which some used to be reserved exclusively for emperors. Cao Cao died in Luoyang in March 220 and was succeeded by his son Cao Pi who accepted the abdication of Emperor Xian in November 220 AD and established the state of Cao Wei to replace the Eastern Han dynasty— an event commonly seen as an usurpation. This marked the transition from the Eastern Han dynasty to the Six Dynasties period. After taking the throne, Cao Pi granted his father the posthumous title "Emperor Wu" ("Martial Emperor") and the temple name "Taizu" ("Grand Ancestor").

Apart from being lauded as a brilliant political and military leader, Cao Cao is celebrated for his poems. Opinions of him have remained divided from as early as the Jin dynasty (266–420 AD) that came immediately after the Three Kingdoms period. There were some who praised him for his achievements in poetry and his career, but there were also others who condemned him for his cruelty, cunning, and allegedly traitorous ways. In traditional Chinese culture, Cao Cao is stereotypically portrayed as a sly, power-hungry, and treacherous tyrant who serves as a nemesis to Liu Bei, often depicted in contraposition as a hero trying to revive the declining Han dynasty.

== Historical sources ==
The authoritative historical source on Cao Cao's life is his official biography in the Records of the Three Kingdoms written by Chen Shou in the third century. His sources for his work on the Wei portion of his book (魏志; Wei Zhi) included the Dongguan Ji (東觀記; now lost), the Book of Wei, and possibly other records. Chen Shou worked in the history bureau and had access to a variety of sources, but followed the traditional method of incorporating information into a single synthesis without citing his sources, so it is not clear how broad a pool of documentation he drew upon.

In the fifth century, Pei Songzhi annotated the Sanguozhi by incorporating information from other sources to Chen Shou's original work and adding his personal commentary, as well as commentary from other historians.

One of the major sources for information on Cao Cao's life employed by Pei Songzhi was the official history of the Wei dynasty, the Book of Wei, largely composed during the Wei dynasty itself by Wang Chen, Xun Yi, and Ruan Ji. It was completed by Wang Chen and presented to the court during the opening years of the succeeding Western Jin dynasty. This work is understandably typically very favourable to Cao Cao as the founding figure of the dynasty under which the initial compilation was performed.

As a counterpoint, another significant source for Cao Cao's life as cited by Pei Songzhi was the Cao Man zhuan (曹瞞傳), an anonymous collection of anecdotes said to have been compiled by a person from Eastern Wu, a rival kingdom to Cao Cao's own. This work is overall very hostile to Cao Cao, depicting him as cruel and untrustworthy, although not every anecdote is negative. Cao Man zhuan has been characterised as "hostile propaganda", and certain contents as "slanderous". Such a work cannot be considered a reliable source, but informs an exaggerated perspective contraposed to the glowing portrait painted by his own dynasty's official history.

For much of his career, Cao Cao hosted and controlled the final Han emperor, whose doings and correspondence it was standard to record. Especially useful for noting things like official appointments, three titles of this type were used by Pei Songzhi to add detail to Chen Shou's account: Xiandi Ji (獻帝記; Records of Emperor Xian) compiled by Liu Ai (劉艾), Xiandi Qiju zhu (獻帝起居注; Notes on Emperor Xian's Daily Life), and Shanyang Gong zaiji (山陽公載記; Records of the Duke of Shanyang [Emperor Xian's post-usurpation title]) by Yue Zi (樂資).

Other early sources for Pei Songzhi included Yu Huan's privately composed histories Dianlüe (典略; Authoritative Account) and Weilüe, written prior to Chen Shou's own work; and Sima Biao's Annals of the Nine Provinces (九州春秋), also from the 3rd century.

Later sources included works by the moralistic historian Sun Sheng, most saliently his Chronicles of the Clans of Wei (魏氏春秋), but also his more critical Yitong Ping (異同評; Commentary on Similarities and Differences) and Yitong Zayu (異同雜語; Miscellaneous Words on Similarities and Differences), which may have been parts of the same work. Although Pei Songzhi sometimes pointed out flaws in Sun Sheng's methods, he often cites him as an authority. Other Jin dynasty historians he gave less credence to, while still including parallel passages from their work, such as Jiangbiao zhuan (江表傳), by Yu Pu (虞溥), and Wei Jin Shiyu (魏晉世語; Tales of the Worlds of Wei and Jin) by Guo Ban (郭頒), a work which Pei Songzhi denigrated in very strident terms. (Note: Pei Songzhi in Chen and Pei 429, 4.133 n. 2)

The official standard history of the Eastern Han dynasty, the Book of the Later Han by Fan Ye, was not available to Pei Songzhi. He and Fan Ye were contemporaries, but Fan Ye did not begin work on his history until a few years after Pei Songzhi completed his. The Book of the Later Han does not contain a full biography of Cao Cao, but records of him and his actions can be found scattered in disparate locations in the book.

Some of Cao Cao's own writing – both literary and in the form of government edicts – has been preserved in later collectanea. His commentary on The Art of War is extant, but offers little insight into his life.

== Background and early life (155–184) ==
Cao Cao's ancestral home was in Qiao County (譙縣), Pei State, which is present-day Bozhou, Anhui. Records of the Three Kingdoms wrote that he was a descendant of Cao Shen, a statesman of the early Western Han dynasty, however this has been refuted by genetic evidence. Testing of documented living descendants of the Cao Cao, combined with ancient DNA analysis of a tooth from his granduncle Cao Ding, placed Cao Cao in Y-DNA haplogroup O-M175 (specifically O2-M268). A follow-up study refined his haplogroup to O1b1-F1462(xPK4).

Cao Cao claimed he was a descendant of Cao Shu Zhen Duo (曹叔振铎), a son of Ji Chang and the founder of State of Cao. His father, Cao Song, served as the Grand Commandant during the reign of Emperor Ling (r. 168–189), buying his way into high government office for an exorbitant sum, and serving less than half a year. Cao Song was a foster son of Cao Teng, a eunuch who served as a Central Regular Attendant and the Empress's Chamberlain under Emperor Huan (r. 146–168), and held the peerage of Marquis of Fei Village (費亭侯). (Note: Chen and Pei 429, 1.1: "太祖武皇帝，沛國譙人也，姓曹，諱操，字孟德，漢相國參之後。桓帝世，曹騰為中常侍大長秋，封費亭侯。養子嵩嗣，官至太尉，莫能審其生出本末。嵩生太祖。")

In his youth, Cao Cao was known to be perceptive and manipulative. He liked to hunt, idle, roam about freely, and play vigilante so he was not as highly regarded (Note: Chen and Pei 429, 1.2: "太祖少機警，有權數，而任俠放蕩，不治行業，故世人未之奇也".) as his more studious peers. From the time Cao Cao was fifteen until he turned thirty, widespread epidemic diseases ravaged China on average one out of every three years.

Despite Cao Cao's loafing ways and unimpressive behaviour, Qiao Xuan and He Yong recognised his potential and extraordinary talents. (Note: Chen and Pei 429, 1.2: "惟梁國橋玄、南陽何顒異焉。玄謂太祖曰：「天下將亂，非命世之才不能濟也，能安之者，其在君乎！」") Upon visiting the famous commentator and character evaluator Xu Shao, Cao Cao was assessed as being "a treacherous villain in times of peace, and a hero in times of chaos". Another source recorded that Xu Shao told Cao Cao, "You will be a capable minister in times of peace, and a jianxiong (Note: The archaic term jianxiong (姦雄) is composed of two Chinese characters – jian (姦; "crafty", "villainous") and xiong (雄; "majestic", "heroic"). It was used to describe a person who is very ambitious (typically power hungry) and who resorts to cunning means to achieve aims. In literary terms, it can be likened to antihero. See the dictionary definition of jianxiong.) in times of chaos." (Note: Sun Sheng, Yitong Zayu: "嘗問許子將：「我何如人？」子將不荅。固問之，子將曰：「子治世之能臣，亂世之姦雄。」太祖大笑。" Cited in Chen and Pei 429, 1.3 n. 3.) (Note: See Xu Shao#Appraisal of Cao Cao for details.)

== Early career (184–189) ==
A summary of the major events in Cao Cao's life
Year(s)	Age	Events
155	0	Born in Qiao County, Pei State (present-day Bozhou, Anhui)
Early career
174	19	Nominated as a xiaolian (civil service candidate)
174–183	19–28	Consecutively held the following appointments: Gentleman Cadet; Commandant of the North District (in Luoyang); Prefect of Dunqiu; Consultant
184	29	Appointed as a Cavalry Commandant and led imperial forces to attack Yellow Turban rebels in Yingchuan (around present-day Xuchang, Henan)
184–189	29–34	Consecutively held the following appointments: Chancellor of Jinan; Colonel Who Arranges the Army (in the Army of the Western Garden)
190	35	Participated in the campaign against Dong Zhuo
Middle career
191–192	36–37	Took control of Yan Province (covering parts of present-day Shandong and Henan) and established his own army
196	41	Received Emperor Xian and established the new capital in Xuchang, Henan; Appointed Minister of Works and acting General of Chariots and Cavalry
193–199	38–44	Waged wars against rival warlords in central China and eliminated them in the following order: Lü Bu (captured and executed in 198); Yuan Shu (died of illness in 199 while under attack by Cao Cao); Zhang Xiu (surrendered in 199)
200	45	Defeated Yuan Shao at the Battle of Guandu
202–207	47–52	Defeated Yuan Shao's heirs and the Wuhuan tribes and unified northern China under his control
208	53	Appointed by Emperor Xian as the Imperial Chancellor
208–209	53–54	Lost to Sun Quan and Liu Bei at the Battle of Red Cliffs
Later career
211	56	Defeated Ma Chao, Han Sui and other western warlords at the Battle of Tong Pass
213	58	Fought with Sun Quan at the Battle of Ruxu (213); Enfeoffed as the Duke of Wei and received a dukedom covering parts of present-day Hebei and Henan
215–216	60–61	Defeated Zhang Lu at the Battle of Yangping
216	61	Promoted from Duke of Wei to (vassal) King of Wei
217	62	Fought with Sun Quan at the Battle of Ruxu (217)
218–219	63–64	Lost to Liu Bei in the Hanzhong Campaign
220	65	Died in Luoyang
Posthumous honours
220	dead	Posthumously honoured as "King Wu" by Emperor Xian; Posthumously honoured as "Emperor Wu" with the temple name "Taizu" by Cao Pi after the establishment of the Cao Wei state

=== As the Commandant of the North District in Luoyang ===
Cao Cao started his career as a civil service cadet after he was nominated as a xiaolian around the age of 19. He was later appointed as the Commandant of the North District (北部尉) of the imperial capital Luoyang and put in charge of maintaining security in that area. Later that year, he was transferred to the position of Prefect of Dunqiu County (頓丘縣; near present-day Qingfeng County, Henan). This represented a horizontal career move to a position of greater authority in a smaller jurisdiction with less political importance. (Note: Chen and Pei 429, 1.2: "年二十，舉孝廉為郎，除洛陽北部尉，遷頓丘令。")

=== As a Consultant ===
Cao Cao's cousin married Song Qi (宋奇), a relative of Empress Song. In 178, when Emperor Ling deposed Empress Song in the aftermath of a political scandal, the empress's family and relatives got into trouble as well. Because of his relationship with Song Qi, Cao Cao was implicated in the scandal and dismissed from office. However, he was pardoned later and recalled to Luoyang to serve as a Consultant (議郎) (Note: Chen and Pei 429, 1.2: "徵拜議郎。") under the Minister of the Household because of his expertise in history. The general Dou Wu and senior minister Chen Fan plotted to get rid of the Ten Attendants, a eunuch faction— their plan failed and they lost their lives. Cao Cao wrote a memorial to Emperor Ling to defend Dou Wu and Chen Fan, and point out that the imperial court was full of corrupt officials and that advice from loyal officials had been ignored. Emperor Ling did not listen to him. (Note: Book of Wei: "太祖從妹夫㶏彊侯宋奇被誅，從坐免官。後以能明古學，復徵拜議郎。先是大將軍竇武、太傅陳蕃謀誅閹官，反為所害。太祖上書陳武等正直而見陷害，姦邪盈朝，善人壅塞，其言甚切；靈帝不能用。" Cited in Chen and Pei 429, 1.3 n.4.)

Emperor Ling later issued a decree, ordering the Three Ducal Ministers to report and dismiss commandery and county officials who performed badly in office. However, the Ministers protected the under-performing officials and accepted bribes, resulting in a situation where evildoers were not punished while the poor and weak were oppressed. Cao Cao felt frustrated when he saw this. When natural disasters occurred, Cao Cao was summoned to the imperial court to discuss the problems in the administration. During this time, he wrote another memorial to Emperor Ling, accusing the Three Ducal Ministers of siding with the nobles and elites, and helping them to cover up their misdeeds. Emperor Ling was stunned after reading the memorial. He admonished the Ministers for their conduct, reinstated the officials who had been wrongly dismissed, and appointed them as Consultants. However, corruption worsened over time and became rampant throughout all levels of the government. Cao Cao stopped speaking up when he realised that his efforts to restore order were futile. (Note: Book of Wei: 是後詔書勑三府：舉奏州縣政理無效，民為作謠言者免罷之。三公傾邪，皆希世見用，貨賂並行，彊者為怨，不見舉奏，弱者守道，多被陷毀。太祖疾之。是歲以災異博問得失，因此復上書切諫，說三公所舉奏專回避貴戚之意。奏上，天子感寤，以示三府責讓之，諸以謠言徵者皆拜議郎。是後政教日亂，豪猾益熾，多所摧毀；太祖知不可匡正，遂不復獻言。" Cited in Chen and Pei 429, 1.3 n.4.)

=== As Chancellor of Jinan ===
In 184, when the Yellow Turban Rebellion broke out, the Han central government commissioned Cao Cao as a Cavalry Commandant (騎都尉) and ordered him to lead imperial forces to attack the rebels in Yingchuan Commandery (around present-day Xuchang, Henan). He was later appointed as the Chancellor of Jinan State (濟南郡; around present-day Jinan, Shandong), a principality in Qing Province which had over 10 counties under its jurisdiction. Many senior officials in Jinan State had connections with the nobles and engaged in corrupt practices, so Cao Cao proposed to the imperial court to dismiss about 80 percent of them. As Cao Cao had a reputation for being a strict law enforcer, when news of his arrival reached these corrupt officials, they were so fearful that they fled to nearby commanderies. Cao Cao governed Jinan State well and maintained peace in the area. (Note: Chen and Pei 429, 1.3–4: "光和末，黃巾起。拜騎都尉，討潁川賊。遷為濟南相，國有十餘縣，長吏多阿附貴戚，贓污狼藉，於是奏免其八；禁斷淫祀，姦宄逃竄，郡界肅然。") (Note: Book of Wei: "長吏受取貪饕，依倚貴勢，歷前相不見舉；聞太祖至，咸皆舉免，小大震怖，姦宄遁逃，竄入他郡。政教大行，一郡清平。" Cited in Chen and Pei 429, 1.4 n.1.)

In the early days of the Western Han, nearly four hundred years previously, Liu Zhang, the Prince of Chengyang State (around present-day Ju County, Shandong), felt that he had made great contributions to the Han Empire, so he built temples in his principality for the people to worship him. Many other commanderies in Qing Province also followed this practice. In Jinan State alone, there were over 600 such temples. Wealthy merchants could even borrow the servants and personal carriages of officials for their own leisure activities. This resulted in greater inequality between the rich and poor. The senior officials did not dare to interfere. When Cao Cao assumed office in Jinan State, he destroyed all the temples and banned such idolatrous practices. He upheld the laws sternly and eliminated unorthodox customs and cult-like activities. (Note: Book of Wei: "初，城陽景王劉章以有功於漢，故其國為立祠，青州諸郡轉相倣效，濟南尤盛，至六百餘祠。賈人或假二千石輿服導從作倡樂，奢侈日甚，民坐貧窮，歷世長吏無敢禁絕者。太祖到，皆毀壞祠屋，止絕官吏民不得祠祀。及至秉政，遂除姦邪鬼神之事，世之淫祀由此遂絕。" Cited in Chen and Pei 429, 1.4 n.1.)

=== Brief resignation ===
After serving as chancellor for a brief time, Cao Cao was reassigned to be the Administrator of Dong Commandery (around present-day Puyang County, Henan), but he declined the appointment on the grounds of poor health, and resigned and went home. (Note: Chen and Pei 429, 1.4: "久之，徵還為東郡太守；不就，稱疾歸鄉里。") The Book of Wei recorded that around the time, corruption had deteriorated to the point where influential officials dominated the imperial court and blatantly abused their powers. Cao Cao was unable to stop them and feared that he might bring trouble to his family because he had been interfering with their activities, so he requested to serve in the Imperial Guards. His request was rejected and he was appointed as a Consultant (議郎) instead. He then claimed that he was ill and resigned and went home. He built a house outside the city and lived there, spending his time reading in spring and summer, and going on hunting excursions in autumn and winter. (Note: Book of Wei: "於是權臣專朝，貴戚橫恣。太祖不能違道取容。數數干忤，恐為家禍，遂乞留宿衞。拜議郎，常託疾病，輙告歸鄉里；築室城外，春夏習讀書傳，秋冬弋獵，以自娛樂。" Cited in Chen and Pei 429, 1.4 n.2.)

Wang Fen (王芬), the Inspector of Ji Province, along with Xu You, Zhou Jing (周旌) and others, plotted to overthrow Emperor Ling and replace him with the Marquis of Hefei (合肥侯). They contacted Cao Cao and asked him to join them but he refused. Wang Fen's plan ultimately failed. (Note: Chen and Pei 429, 1.4: "頃之，冀州刺史王芬、南陽許攸、沛國周旌等連結豪傑，謀廢靈帝，立合肥侯，以告太祖，太祖拒之。芬等遂敗。")

When Bian Zhang, Han Sui and others started a rebellion in Liang Province, Cao Cao was appointed as Colonel Who Arranges the Army (典軍校尉) and summoned back to Luoyang to serve in the Army of the Western Garden. (Note: Chen and Pei 429, 1.5: "金城邊章、韓遂殺刺史郡守以叛，衆十餘萬，天下騷動。徵太祖為典軍校尉。")

== Campaign against Dong Zhuo (189–191) ==
=== Background ===
Emperor Ling died in 189 and was succeeded by his son, Liu Bian, who is historically known as Emperor Shao. As Emperor Shao was still young, his mother Empress Dowager He and maternal uncle He Jin ruled as regents on his behalf. He Jin plotted with Yuan Shao and others to eliminate the eunuch faction, and shared their plan with his sister. When the empress dowager was reluctant to kill the eunuchs, He Jin thought of summoning generals stationed outside Luoyang to lead their troops into the imperial capital to put pressure on the empress dowager. (Note: Chen and Pei 429, 1.5: "會靈帝崩，太子即位，太后臨朝。大將軍何進與袁紹謀誅宦官，太后不聽。進乃召董卓，欲以脅太后".) Cao Cao strongly objected to He Jin's idea as he believed that the best way to deal with the eunuchs was to eliminate their leaders. He also argued that summoning external forces into Luoyang would only increase the risk of their plan being leaked out. (Note: Book of Wei: "太祖聞而笑之曰：「閹豎之官，古今宜有，但世主不當假之權寵，使至於此。旣治其罪，當誅元惡，一獄吏足矣，何必紛紛召外將乎？欲盡誅之，事必宣露，吾見其敗也。」Cited in Chen and Pei 429, 1.5 n. 1.) He Jin – the highest-ranking officer in the government – understandably ignored him.

As Cao Cao predicted, the eunuchs got wind of He Jin's plot and assassinated him before the generals and their troops arrived. Yuan Shao and He Jin's followers led their forces to storm the imperial palace and slaughter the eunuchs in revenge. Emperor Shao and his younger half-brother, Liu Xie, escaped during the chaos. They were eventually found and brought back to the palace by Dong Zhuo, who took advantage of the power vacuum to seize control of the central government. Later that year, Dong Zhuo deposed Emperor Shao and replaced him with Liu Xie, who is historically known as Emperor Xian. The deposed Emperor Shao became the Prince of Hongnong. (Note: Chen and Pei 429, 1.5: "卓未至而進見殺。卓到，廢帝為弘農王而立獻帝".)

Dong Zhuo wanted to appoint Cao Cao as a Colonel of Valiant Cavalry (驍騎校尉) and recruit him as an adviser. However, Cao Cao adopted a fake identity, escaped from Luoyang, and returned to his home in Chenliu Commandery (陳留郡; near present-day Kaifeng). (Note: Chen and Pei 429, 1.5: "卓表太祖為驍騎校尉，欲與計事。太祖乃變易姓名，間行東歸。") He had two encounters along the way. The first was with the family of Lü Boshe, an old acquaintance. The second incident occurred when he passed by Zhongmu County, where a village chief suspected that he was a fugitive and arrested him. However, another official recognised Cao Cao and believed he could act as a positive influence, so he released Cao Cao. (Note: Chen and Pei 429, 1.5: "出關，過中牟，為亭長所疑，執詣縣，邑中或竊識之，為請得解。")

=== The campaign ===
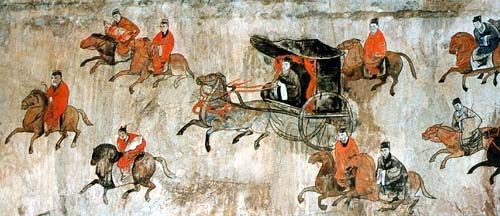
A mural showing chariots and cavalry, from the Dahuting Tomb of the late Eastern Han Dynasty (25–220 CE), located in Zhengzhou, Henan province, China

Dong Zhuo murdered the Prince of Hongnong and later the Empress Dowager He. When Cao Cao returned to Chenliu Commandery, he spent his family fortune on raising an army to eliminate Dong Zhuo. In the winter of 189, Cao Cao assembled his forces in Jiwu County (己吾縣; southwest of present-day Ningling County, Henan) and declared war on Dong Zhuo. (Note: Chen and Pei 429, 1.5: "卓遂殺太后及弘農王。太祖至陳留，散家財，合義兵，將以誅卓。冬十二月，始起兵於己吾，是歲中平六年也。")

In early 190, several regional officials and warlords formed a coalition army numbering some tens of thousands, and launched a punitive campaign against Dong Zhuo. They declared that their mission was to free Emperor Xian and the central government from Dong Zhuo's control. Yuan Shao was elected as the coalition chief while Cao Cao served as acting General of Uplifting Martial Might (奮武將軍). The coalition scored some initial victories against Dong Zhuo's forces and reached Luoyang within months. Dong Zhuo, alarmed by his losses, ordered his troops to forcefully relocate Luoyang's residents to Chang'an and burn down the imperial capital, leaving behind nothing for the coalition. (Note: Chen and Pei 429, 1.6: "初平元年春正月 ...衆各數萬，推紹為盟主。太祖行奮武將軍。")

While Dong Zhuo was retreating to Chang'an, Cao Cao led his own army to pursue the enemy, but was defeated by Xu Rong, a general under Dong Zhuo, at the Battle of Xingyang. This was the first military action Cao Cao commanded, and he barely escaped alive, with help from his cousin Cao Hong. He returned to the coalition base in Suanzao County (酸棗縣; southwest of present-day Yanjin County, Henan) and was disgusted to see that the other coalition members were making merry instead of thinking how to make progress. He presented his plan on how to continue the war against Dong Zhuo and chided them for their lacklustre attitudes towards their initial goals. They ignored him. (Note: Chen and Pei 429, 1.7–8: "太祖到酸棗，諸軍兵十餘萬，日置酒高會，不圖進取。太祖責讓之，因為謀曰：「諸君聽吾計，使勃海引河內之衆臨孟津，酸棗諸將守成臯，據敖倉，塞轘轅、太谷，全制其險；使袁將軍率南陽之軍軍丹、析，入武關，以震三輔：皆高壘深壁，勿與戰，益為疑兵，示天下形勢，以順誅逆，可立定也。今兵以義動，持疑而不進，失天下之望，竊為諸君耻之！」邈等不能用。")

=== Aftermath ===
As Cao Cao had few troops left with him after the Battle of Xingyang, he travelled to Yang Province with Xiahou Dun to recruit soldiers. Chen Wen (陳溫), the Inspector of Yang Province, and Zhou Xin, the Administrator of Danyang Commandery (丹楊郡), gave him over 4,000 troops. On the way back, when they passed by Longkang County (龍亢縣; in present-day Huaiyuan County, Anhui), many soldiers started a mutiny and set fire to Cao Cao's tent at night, but he was able to escape. (Note: Book of Wei: "兵謀叛，夜燒太祖帳". Cited in Chen and Pei 429, 1.8 n. 1 (first n. 1)) When Cao Cao reached Zhi (銍; west of present-day Suzhou, Anhui) and Jianping (建平; southwest of present-day Xiayi County, Henan) counties later, he managed to regroup over 1,000 soldiers and lead them to a garrison in Henei Commandery (around present-day Wuzhi County, Henan). (Note: Chen and Pei 429, 1.8: "太祖兵少，乃與夏侯惇等詣揚州募兵，刺史陳溫、丹楊太守周昕與兵四千餘人。還到龍亢，士卒多叛。至銍、建平，復收兵得千餘人，進屯河內。")

Yuan Shao and Han Fu thought of installing Liu Yu, the Governor of You Province, on the throne to replace Emperor Xian. When they sought Cao Cao's opinion, (Note: Chen and Pei 429, 1.8: "袁紹與韓馥謀立幽州牧劉虞為帝，太祖拒之。") Cao Cao refused to support them and reaffirmed his allegiance to Emperor Xian. (Note: Book of Wei: "太祖答袁紹曰：「董卓之罪，暴於四海，吾等合大衆興義兵，遠近莫不響應，此以義動故也。今幼主微弱，制於姦臣，未有昌邑亡國之釁，而一旦改易，天下其孰安之？諸君北面，我自西向。」" Cited in Chen and Pei 429, 1.8 n. 1 (second n. 1)) Yuan Shao's plan turned out to be unsuccessful because Liu Yu himself did not want to be emperor.

Yuan Shao once invited Cao Cao to sit beside him and showed him a jade seal, indicating his imperial ambition, and a tacit request for Cao Cao's support. Finding this despicable, Cao Cao laughed at him. (Note: Chen and Pei 429, 1.8: "紹又嘗得一玉印，於太祖坐中舉向其肘，太祖由是笑而惡焉。")

== Military exploits in central China (191–199) ==
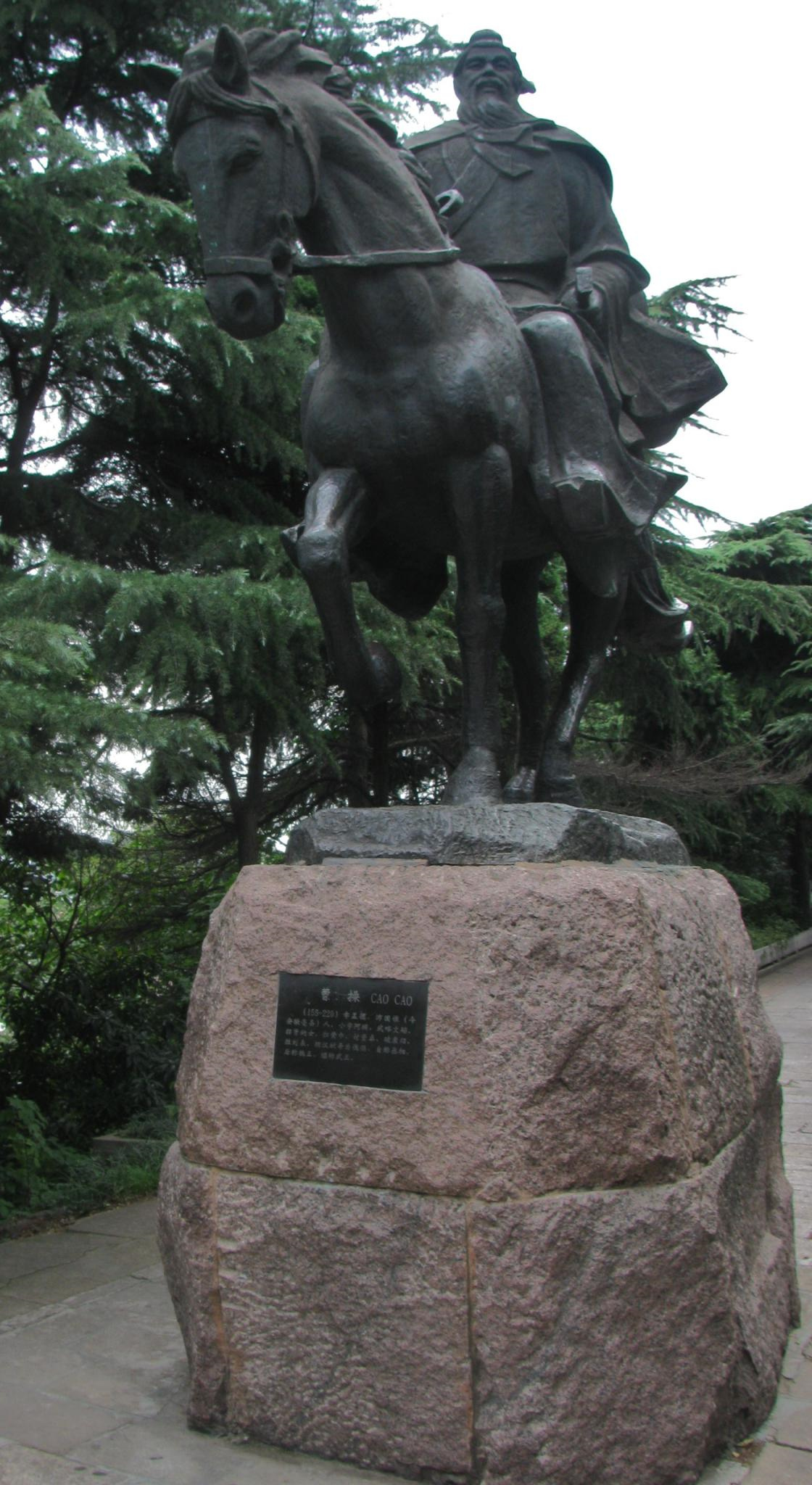
Statue of Cao Cao in Wuhan

=== Pacifying Yan Province ===
Between 191 and 192, Yuan Shao appointed Cao Cao Administrator of Dong Commandery. This position allowed him to exact taxes and conscript soldiers. His first territorial command in that respect marks the beginning of his career as a warlord. During this time, he defeated the Heishan bandits, who were causing trouble in the region, and some Southern Xiongnu forces led by Yufuluo in Neihuang County. (Note: Chen and Pei 429, 1.8–9: "黑山賊于毒、白繞、眭固等十餘萬衆略魏郡、東郡，王肱不能禦，太祖引兵入東郡，擊白繞于濮陽，破之。袁紹因表太祖為東郡太守，治東武陽。 ...太祖要擊眭固，又擊匈奴於夫羅於內黃，皆大破之。")

Around the time, remnants from the Yellow Turban Rebellion swarmed into Yan Province from Qing Province. Liu Dai, the Governor of Yan Province, was killed in a battle against the rebels. Bao Xin, Chen Gong and others invited Cao Cao to replace Liu Dai as the Governor of Yan Province. Cao Cao defeated the rebels in battle and received the surrender of over 300,000 rebels and hundreds of thousands of civilians (the rebels' family members). From among them, he recruited the more battle-hardened ones to form a new military unit known as the Qingzhou Corps (青州兵). (Note: Chen and Pei 429, 1.9–10: "青州黃巾衆百萬入兖州，...信乃與州吏萬潛等至東郡迎太祖領兖州牧。遂進兵擊黃巾于壽張東。 ...追黃巾至濟北。乞降。冬，受降卒三十餘萬，男女百餘萬口，收其精銳者，號為青州兵。")

=== Conflict between Yuan Shao and Yuan Shu ===
Yuan Shu had disagreements with Yuan Shao so he contacted Gongsun Zan, Yuan Shao's rival in northern China, for help in dealing with Yuan Shao. Gongsun Zan instructed Liu Bei, Shan Jing (單經) and Tao Qian to garrison at Gaotang, Pingyuan and Fagan (發干; east of present-day Guan County, Shandong) counties respectively to put pressure on Yuan Shao. Yuan Shao allied with Cao Cao and defeated all the opposing forces. In the spring of 193, Cao Cao defeated Yuan Shu at the Battle of Fengqiu and returned to Dingtao County by summer. (Note: Chen and Pei 429, 1.10: "袁術與紹有隙，術求援於公孫瓚，瓚使劉備屯高唐，單經屯平原，陶謙屯發干，以逼紹。太祖與紹會擊，皆破之。四年春，軍鄄城。荊州牧劉表斷術糧道，術引軍入陳留，屯封丘，黑山餘賊及於夫羅等佐之。術使將劉詳屯匡亭。太祖擊詳，術救之，與戰，大破之。術退保封丘，遂圍之，未合，術走襄邑，追到太壽，決渠水灌城。走寧陵，又追之，走九江。夏，太祖還軍定陶。")

=== Conflict with Tao Qian ===
Between 193 and 194, Cao Cao came into conflict with Tao Qian, the Governor of Xu Province, and attacked Xu Province three times. The first attack took place in the autumn of 193, when Cao Cao attacked Tao Qian after the latter supported Que Xuan (闕宣), who had committed treason by declaring himself emperor. (Note: Chen and Pei 429, 1.10: "下邳闕宣聚衆數千人，自稱天子；徐州牧陶謙與共舉兵，取泰山華、費，略任城。秋，太祖征陶謙，下十餘城，謙守城不敢出。") The second and third invasions were triggered by the murder of Cao Cao's father, Cao Song, in Xu Province, which occurred when Cao Song was en route to Qiao County (譙縣; present-day Bozhou, Anhui) after his retirement. Although Tao Qian's culpability in the murder was questionable, Cao Cao nonetheless held him responsible for his father's death. During the invasions, Cao Cao conquered several territories in Xu Province and massacred thousands of civilians. (Note: Chen and Pei 429, 1.11: "初，太祖父嵩去官後還譙...爲陶謙所害，故太祖志在復讎東伐。夏...復征陶謙，拔五城，遂略地至東海。還過郯，謙將曹豹與劉備屯郯東，要太祖。太祖擊破之，遂攻拔襄賁，所過多所殘戮。") Cao Cao's assault on Xu Province was so brutal that after one massacre the corpses of his victims stoppered up the nearby Si river (泗水). (Note: Chen and Pei 429, 8.249) His army tore down villages in its wake, ensuring refugees could not return, and ate all the chickens and dogs. Cao Cao only turned back when he received news that his base in Yan Province had fallen to Lü Bu.

=== War with Lü Bu ===
In 194, Cao Cao's subordinates Zhang Miao, Chen Gong and others rebelled against him in Yan Province and defected to the rival warlord Lü Bu. Many commanderies and counties in Yan Province responded to Lü Bu's call and defected to his side except for a few. Cao Cao aborted his campaign in Xu Province and returned to attack Lü Bu. In one battle at Puyang County, he fell into an ambush and suffered some burns but managed to survive and escape. Cao Cao and Lü Bu were locked in a stalemate at Puyang County for over 100 days until Lü Bu left the county when his supplies ran out due to natural disasters such as locust plagues and droughts. (Note: Chen and Pei 429, 1.11–12: "布出兵戰，先以騎犯青州兵。青州兵奔，太祖陳亂馳突火出，墜馬，燒左手掌。司馬樓異扶太祖上馬，遂引去。 ...與布相守百餘日。蝗蟲起，百姓大餓，布糧食亦盡，各引去。".) Grain supplies were so limited that Cao Cao strongly considered an offer to serve under Yuan Shao, but was persuaded against it and ceased recruitment instead. He sent his army to collect food, but his numerically inferior forces were able to turn back an attack by Lü Bu that summer using deceptive tactics. (Note: Chen and Pei 429, 1.12: "布復從東緍與陳宮將萬餘人來戰，時太祖兵少，設伏，縱奇兵擊，大破之。") (Note: Book of Wei: "於是兵皆出取麥，在者不能千人，屯營不固。太祖乃令婦人守陴，悉兵拒之。屯西有大隄，其南樹木幽深。布疑有伏，...引軍屯南十餘里。明日復來，太祖隱兵隄裏，出半兵隄外。布益進，乃令輕兵挑戰，旣合，伏兵乃悉乘隄，步騎並進，大破之。" Cited in Chen and Pei 429, 1.12–13 n. 1 (second n. 1).)

From 194 to late 195, Cao Cao attacked the territories in Yan Province and managed to retake them from Lü Bu. Lü Bu fled east to Xu Province and took refuge under Liu Bei, who had succeeded Tao Qian as the Governor of Xu Province earlier in 194. In the winter of 195, the central government officially designated Cao Cao as the Governor of Yan Province. (Note: Chen and Pei 429, 1.11–12: "會張邈與陳宮叛迎呂布，郡縣皆應。 ...布夜走，太祖復攻，拔定陶，分兵平諸縣。布東奔劉備 ...冬十月，天子拜太祖兖州牧。")

In 196, Lü Bu turned against his host and seized control of Xu Province from Liu Bei, but still allowed Liu Bei to remain in Xiaopei (小沛; present-day Pei County, Jiangsu). Although he agreed to an alliance with Yuan Shu earlier, he broke his promise and severed ties with Yuan Shu when the latter declared himself emperor in early 197. (Note: Zizhi Tongjian 1084, volume 62: "[獻帝建安二年]...袁術稱帝於壽春，自稱仲家") Throughout 197, Lü Bu joined Cao Cao and others in a campaign against Yuan Shu, who had become a public enemy because of his treasonous actions. (Note: Chen and Pei 429, 1.15: "袁術欲稱帝於淮南，使人告呂布。布收其使，上其書。術怒，攻布，為布所破。") However, in 198, Lü Bu sided with Yuan Shu again and attacked Liu Bei, who lost and fled to join Cao Cao. In the winter of 198, Cao Cao and Liu Bei combined forces to attack Lü Bu and defeated him at the Battle of Xiapi. Lü Bu was captured and executed after his defeat. Cao Cao also pacified the eastern parts of Xu and Qing provinces along the coast. (Note: Chen and Pei 429, 1.16: "呂布復為袁術使高順攻劉備，公遣夏侯惇救之，不利。備為順所敗。九月，公東征布。 ...月餘，布將宋憲、魏續等執陳宮，舉城降，生禽布、宮，皆殺之。太山臧霸、孫觀、吳敦、尹禮、昌豨各聚衆。布之破劉備也，霸等悉從布。布敗，獲霸等，公厚納待，遂割青、徐二州附於海以委焉，分琅邪、東海、北海為城陽、利城、昌慮郡。")

=== Receiving Emperor Xian ===
Emperor Xian had been held hostage in Chang'an by Li Jue, Guo Si and other former followers of Dong Zhuo. Around 195, when internal conflict broke out between Li Jue and Guo Si, Emperor Xian escaped from Chang'an and after a harrowing journey returned to the ruins of Luoyang, which Dong Zhuo had ordered to be destroyed by fire in 190 when moving the capital to Chang'an. In Luoyang, Emperor Xian came under the protection of Dong Cheng, former bandit Yang Feng, and other petty strongmen who have been characterised as "ragtag gangsters". The emperor sought refuge under Yuan Shao, but was rebuffed. In February or March 196, acting on the advice of Xun Yu and Cheng Yu, Cao Cao sent Cao Hong west to fetch Emperor Xian but was blocked by Dong Cheng and Yuan Shu's subordinate Chang Nu (萇奴). Between March and April 196, Cao Cao defeated Yellow Turban remnants in Runan (汝南) and Yingchuan (潁川) commanderies and was appointed General Who Establishes Virtue (建德將軍). In July or August 196, Cao Cao was promoted to General Who Garrisons the East (鎮東將軍) and enfeoffed as the Marquis of Fei Village (費亭侯) – the peerage previously held by his adoptive grandfather Cao Teng. (Note: Chen and Pei 429, 1.13: "太祖將迎天子，諸將或疑，荀彧、程昱勸之，乃遣曹洪將兵西迎，衞將軍董承與袁術將萇奴拒險，洪不得進。汝南、潁川黃巾何儀、劉辟、黃邵、何曼等，衆各數萬，初應袁術，又附孫堅。二月，太祖進軍討破之，斬辟、邵等，儀及其衆皆降。天子拜太祖建德將軍，夏六月，遷鎮東將軍，封費亭侯。")

Sometime between August and September 196, Cao Cao led his forces to the ruins of Luoyang and received Emperor Xian. The emperor granted Cao Cao a ceremonial axe and appointed him Manager of the Affairs of the Imperial Secretariat (錄尚書事) and Colonel-Director of Retainers (司隷校尉). (Note: Xiandi Ji: "又領司隷校尉。" Cited in Chen and Pei 429, 1.13 n. 2.) As Luoyang was in bad shape, Dong Zhao and others advised Cao Cao to move the imperial capital to Xu (許; present-day Xuchang, Henan). So, in October or early November 196, Cao Cao and his forces escorted Emperor Xian to Xuchang, which became the new imperial capital. Cao Cao had himself appointed General-in-Chief (大將軍) and promoted from a village marquis to a county marquis under the title "Marquis of Wuping" (武平侯), later characterised as ten thousand households. (Note: Cao Cao (429) [211], 十二月己亥令 [Cao Cao's Apologia], Wei Wu gu shi 魏武故事 [The Memoirs of Lord Wu of Wei], "但食武平萬戶" Cited in Chen and Pei 429, 1.32–34 n. 1.) Since Dong Zhuo moved the capital from Luoyang to Chang'an in 190, the imperial court had been in a state of disorder. However, after Cao Cao received Emperor Xian and established the new imperial capital in Xuchang, order was restored, (Note: Chen and Pei 429, 1.13: "秋七月，楊奉、韓暹以天子還洛陽，奉別屯梁。太祖遂至洛陽，衞京都，暹遁走。天子假太祖節鉞，錄尚書事。洛陽殘破，董昭等勸太祖都許。九月，車駕出轘轅而東，以太祖為大將軍，封武平侯。自天子西遷，朝廷日亂，至是宗廟社稷制度始立。") although Cao Cao did have the emperor's confidante Zhao Yan (趙彥) killed for secretively keeping the emperor updated on the great affairs of state.

Cao Cao sent an imperial decree to Yuan Shao in Emperor Xian's name to appoint him as Grand Commandant (太尉). Yuan Shao was unhappy because Grand Commandant ranked below Cao Cao's position, General-in-Chief, so he rejected the appointment. When Cao Cao heard about it, he gave up his position as General-in-Chief and offered it to Yuan Shao. Emperor Xian reappointed Cao Cao as Minister of Works (司空) and acting General of Chariots and Cavalry (車騎將軍). Struck by the difficulties Yuan Shao and Yuan Shu had faced in supplying their armies, as well as his own struggles with food supply in recent years, Cao Cao followed Zao Zhi and Han Hao's suggestion to implement the tuntian system of agriculture (Note: Chen and Pei 429, 1.13: "於是以袁紹為太尉，紹恥班在公下，不肯受。公乃固辭，以大將軍讓紹。天子拜公司空，行車騎將軍。是歲用棗祗、韓浩等議，始興屯田。") to produce a sustainable supply of grain for his growing army. (Note: Book of Wei: "袁紹之在河北，軍人仰食桑椹。袁術在江、淮，取給蒲蠃。民人相食，州里蕭條。 ...是歲乃募民屯田許下，得穀百萬斛。於是州郡例置田官，所在積穀。征伐四方，無運糧之勞。" Cited in Chen and Pei 429, 1.14 n. 1.) The tuntian agricultural colonies gave Cao Cao an advantage over his adversaries, allowing him to resettle internally displaced refugees, redevelop abandoned arable lands, shorten his supply lines, reduce the amount of defensive assets tasked to defend farms and granaries, and increase the area and productivity of lands held directly by the state.

=== Battles with Zhang Xiu ===
In early 197, Cao Cao led his forces to Wancheng (宛城; present-day Wancheng District in Nanyang, Henan) to attack a rival warlord, Zhang Xiu. Zhang Xiu initially surrendered without a fight, but due to ill treatment changed his mind and attacked Cao Cao and caught him off guard. Cao Cao lost his eldest son Cao Ang, nephew Cao Anmin (曹安民) and close bodyguard Dian Wei in the battle. He returned to Xuchang after his defeat, but attacked Zhang Xiu again later that year and pacified Huyang (湖陽; southwest of present-day Tanghe County, Henan) and Wuyin (舞陰; southeast of present-day Sheqi County, Henan) counties. In early 198, he led another campaign against Zhang Xiu and besieged him in Rangcheng (穰城; present-day Dengzhou, Henan) but withdrew his forces about two months later. Before retreating back to Xuchang, he set up an ambush and defeated Zhang Xiu's pursuing forces. In late 199, acting on Jia Xu's advice, Zhang Xiu voluntarily surrendered to Cao Cao, who accepted his surrender. (Note: Chen and Pei 429, 1.14–17: "二年春正月，公到宛。張繡降，旣而悔之，復反。公與戰，軍敗，為流矢所中，長子昂、弟子安民遇害。 ...冬十一月，公自南征，至宛。 ...湖陽降。攻舞陰，下之。 ...公將引還，繡兵來追，公軍不得進，連營稍前。 ...會明，賊謂公為遁也，悉軍來追。乃縱奇兵步騎夾攻，大破之。秋七月，公還許。 ...冬十一月，張繡率衆降，封列侯。")

=== Campaign against Yuan Shu ===
In early 197, Yuan Shu declared himself emperor in Shouchun (壽春; present-day Shou County, Anhui) – an act regarded as treason against Emperor Xian. He soon came under attack by Cao Cao and various forces, including his former ally Lü Bu. In the autumn of 197, Cao Cao defeated Yuan Shu in battle, captured several of his officers, and had them executed. By 199, some months after Lü Bu's defeat at the Battle of Xiapi, Yuan Shu, who was already in dire straits, wanted to abandon his lands in the Huainan region and head north to join Yuan Shao. Cao Cao sent Liu Bei and Zhu Ling to lead forces to intercept and block Yuan Shu in Xu Province. Yuan Shu died of illness while under siege by Liu Bei and Zhu Ling. (Note: Chen and Pei 429, 1.15, 19: "秋九月，術侵陳，公東征之。術聞公自來，棄軍走，留其將橋蕤、李豐、梁綱、樂就；公到，擊破蕤等，皆斬之。術走渡淮。公還許。 ...袁術自敗於陳，稍困，袁譚自青州遣迎之。術欲從下邳北過，公遣劉備、朱靈要之。會術病死。")

== War with Yuan Shao (199–202) ==
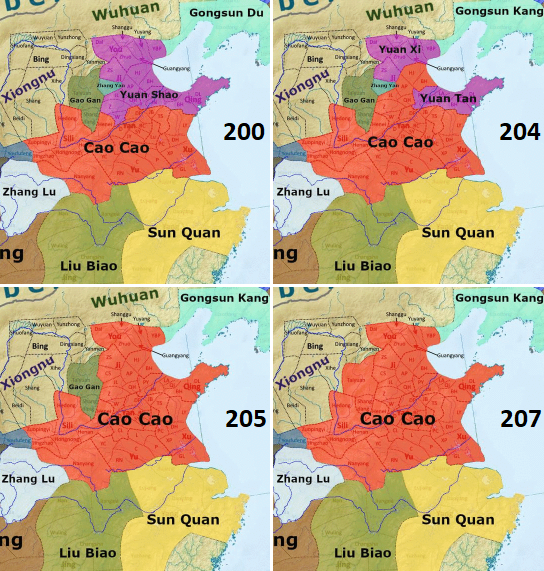
Cao Cao's conquests from the Yuan clan 200–207

=== Background ===
While Cao Cao was waging wars throughout central China in the 190s, Yuan Shao defeated his rival Gongsun Zan at the Battle of Yijing in 199, after which he controlled four provinces in northern China (Ji, Bing, Qing and You) and gained command of thousands of troops. A power struggle between Cao Cao and Yuan Shao became inevitable by early 199. In the autumn of 199, Cao Cao dispatched troops to Liyang County (黎陽縣; present-day Xun County, Henan) and sent Zang Ba and others to capture some territories in Qing Province while leaving Yu Jin to guard the southern bank of the Yellow River. In winter, he mobilised his forces and deployed them at Guandu (官渡; present-day Guandu Town, Zhongmu County, Henan). (Note: Chen and Pei 429, 1.17: "是時袁紹旣并公孫瓚，兼四州之地，衆十餘萬，將進軍攻許... 秋八月，公進軍黎陽，使臧霸等入青州破齊、北海、東安，留于禁屯河上。九月，公還許，分兵守官渡。 ...十二月，公軍官渡。")

==== Campaign against Liu Bei in Xu Province ====
Around this time, Cheng Yu and Guo Jia had warned Cao Cao against allowing Liu Bei to leave Xuchang but it was too late because Cao Cao had already sent Liu Bei to intercept and block Yuan Shu. Earlier, when he was still in Xuchang, Liu Bei had secretly joined a plot initiated by Dong Cheng and others to get rid of Cao Cao. After leaving Xuchang, Liu Bei headed to Xu Province, killed the provincial inspector Che Zhou (車冑), and seized control of Xu Province. Cao Cao sent Liu Dai (劉岱) (Note: This Liu Dai (劉岱) was not the same person as Liu Dai; courtesy name Gongshan), the Governor of Yan Province, who was killed in 192.) and Wang Zhong to attack Liu Bei but they were defeated. (Note: Chen and Pei 429, 1.18: "程昱、郭嘉聞公遣備，言於公曰：「劉備不可縱。」公悔，追之不及。備之未東也，陰與董承等謀反，至下邳，遂殺徐州刺史車冑，舉兵屯沛。遣劉岱、王忠擊之，不克。")

In February 200, Cao Cao got wind of Dong Cheng's plot and had all the conspirators arrested and executed. He then led a campaign to retake Xu Province from Liu Bei, defeated him, and captured his family. Liu Bei's general Guan Yu, who was guarding Xu Province's capital, Xiapi (下邳; present-day Pizhou, Jiangsu), surrendered and temporarily served Cao Cao. Liu Bei fled north to join Yuan Shao after his defeat. Some of Cao Cao's subordinates initially expressed worries that Yuan Shao might attack them while Cao Cao was away in Xu Province, but, as Cao Cao accurately predicted, (Note: See Guo Jia#Suggestion to Cao Cao to attack Liu Bei first before attacking Yuan Shao. This account says that Guo Jia was the one who predicted that Yuan Shao would not make any move while Cao Cao was attacking Liu Bei.) Yuan Shao did not make any advances throughout this period of time, (Note: Chen and Pei 429, 1.18: "五年春正月，董承等謀泄，皆伏誅。公將自東征備，諸將皆曰：「與公爭天下者，袁紹也。今紹方來而棄之東，紹乘人後，若何？」公曰：「夫劉備，人傑也，今不擊，必為後患。袁紹雖有大志，而見事遟，必不動也。」郭嘉亦勸公，遂東擊備，破之... 公還官渡，紹卒不出。") possibly due to Cao Cao's general Yu Jin's raiding in the south of Yuan Shao's territory. (Note: Chen and Pei 429, 17.523)

=== Early stages ===
From early to mid 200, the forces of Cao Cao and Yuan Shao clashed in two separate engagements at Boma (白馬; present-day Hua County, Henan) and Yan Ford (延津; near present-day Yanjin County, Henan). At Boma, Yuan Shao sent Guo Tu, Chunyu Qiong and Yan Liang to besiege Cao Cao's general Liu Yan (劉延), but the siege was lifted after about two months when Cao Cao personally led an army to relief Liu Yan. Guan Yu slew Yan Liang in the midst of battle. While Cao Cao and his troops were evacuating Boma's residents, Yuan Shao's forces led by Wen Chou and Liu Bei caught up with them at Yan Ford, but were defeated and Wen Chou was killed in battle. Cao Cao returned to his main camp at Guandu while Yuan Shao moved to Yangwu County (陽武縣; southwest of present-day Yuanyang County, Henan). Around this time, Guan Yu left Cao Cao and returned to Liu Bei. (Note: Chen and Pei 429, 1.19: "二月，紹遣郭圖、淳于瓊、顏良攻東郡太守劉延於白馬，紹引兵至黎陽，將渡河。夏四月，公北救延。 ...公乃引軍兼行趣白馬，未至十餘里，良大驚，來逆戰。使張遼、關羽前登，擊破，斬良。遂解白馬圍，徙其民，循河而西。紹於是渡河追公軍，至延津南。 ...時騎不滿六百，遂縱兵擊，大破之，斬醜、良。醜、良皆紹名將也，再戰，悉禽，紹軍大震。公還軍官渡。紹進保陽武。關羽亡歸劉備。")

=== Stalemate at Guandu and the raid on Wuchao ===
In late 200, Yuan Shao led his forces to attack Cao Cao at Guandu. Both sides were locked in a stalemate for months and Cao Cao's supplies were gradually running out and his men were growing weary. During this time, Yuan Shao sent Liu Bei to contact a rebel chief, Liu Pi (劉辟), in Runan Commandery (near present-day Xinyang, Henan) and join Liu Pi in making a sneak attack on Cao Cao's base in Xuchang while Cao Cao was away at Guandu. However, Liu Bei and Liu Pi were defeated and driven back by Cao Cao's general Cao Ren. During this time, Sun Ce, a warlord based in the Jiangdong region, also contemplated attacking Xuchang and taking Emperor Xian hostage. However, he was assassinated before he could execute his plan. (Note: Chen and Pei 429, 1.20–21: "孫策聞公與紹相持，乃謀襲許，未發，為刺客所殺。汝南降賊劉辟等叛應紹，略許下。紹使劉備助辟，公使曹仁擊破之。備走，遂破辟屯。袁紹運穀車數千乘至，公用荀攸計，遣徐晃、史渙邀擊，大破之，盡燒其車。公與紹相拒連月，雖比戰斬將，然衆少糧盡，士卒疲乏。")

In the winter of 200, following the advice of Xu You, a defector from Yuan Shao's side, Cao Cao left Cao Hong behind to defend his main camp at Guandu while he personally led 5,000 riders to raid Yuan Shao's supply depot at Wuchao (烏巢; southeast of present-day Yanjin County, Henan), which was guarded by Chunyu Qiong. Cao Cao succeeded in destroying Yuan Shao's supplies. When Yuan Shao heard that Wuchao was under attack, he sent Zhang He and Gao Lan to attack Cao Cao's main camp in the hope of diverting Cao Cao's attention away from Wuchao. However, Zhang He and Gao Lan, already frustrated with Yuan Shao, destroyed their own camps and led their troops to defect to Cao Cao's side. The morale of Yuan Shao's army fell drastically and they were utterly defeated by Cao Cao's forces, after which Yuan Shao hastily crossed the Yellow River and retreated back to northern China. Much of his supplies and many of his soldiers were captured by Cao Cao. Cao Cao also obtained several letters written by spies from his side to Yuan Shao, but he refused to conduct an investigation to find out who the spies were, and instead ordered all the letters to be burnt. Many commanderies in Ji Province surrendered to Cao Cao. (Note: Chen and Pei 429, 1.21: "公謂運者曰：「却十五日為汝破紹，不復勞汝矣。」冬十月，紹遣車運穀，使淳于瓊等五人將兵萬餘人送之，宿紹營北四十里。紹謀臣許攸貪財，紹不能足，來奔，因說公擊瓊等。左右疑之，荀攸、賈詡勸公。公乃留曹洪守，自將步騎五千人夜往，會明至。瓊等望見公兵少，出陳門外。公急擊之，瓊退保營，遂攻之。紹遣騎救瓊。左右或言「賊騎稍近，請分兵拒之」。公怒曰：「賊在背後，乃白！」士卒皆殊死戰，大破瓊等，皆斬之。紹初聞公之擊瓊，謂長子譚曰：「就彼攻瓊等，吾攻拔其營，彼固無所歸矣！」乃使張郃、高覽攻曹洪。郃等聞瓊破，遂來降。紹衆大潰，紹及譚棄軍走，渡河。追之不及，盡收其輜重圖書珍寶，虜其衆。公收紹書中，得許下及軍中人書，皆焚之。冀州諸郡多舉城邑降者。")

=== Aftermath ===
In the summer of 201, Cao Cao led his forces across the Yellow River and attacked Yuan Shao again, inflicting another crushing defeat on him at the Battle of Cangting and pacifying the territories in the area. In autumn, Cao Cao returned to Xuchang and sent Cai Yang (蔡揚) to attack Liu Bei, who had left Yuan Shao and allied with another rebel chief, Gong Du (共都), (Note: Gong Du's name is spelt 共都 in Cao Cao's biography, and 龔都 in Liu Bei's.) in Runan Commandery. Liu Bei defeated and killed Cai Yang in battle. (Note: Chen and Pei 429, 32.876: "紹遣先主將本兵復至汝南，與賊龔都等合，眾數千人。曹公遣蔡陽擊之，為先主所殺。") Cao Cao personally led his forces to attack Liu Bei, who fled south upon learning Cao Cao himself was in command. He took shelter under governor Liu Biao in Jing Province. (Note: Chen and Pei 429, 1.22: "六年夏四月，揚兵河上，擊紹倉亭軍，破之。紹歸，復收散卒，攻定諸叛郡縣。九月，公還許。紹之未破也，使劉備略汝南，汝南賊共都等應之。遣蔡揚擊都，不利，為都所破。公南征備。備聞公自行，走奔劉表，都等皆散。") The following spring, while in his hometown, Cao Cao issued a proclamation characterising his military actions as a righteous uprising. (Note: Chen and Pei 429, 1.22–23: "七年春正月，公軍譙，令曰：「吾起義兵，爲天下除暴亂。舊土人民，死喪略盡，國中終日行，不見所識，使吾悽愴傷懷。其舉義兵已來，將士絕無後者，求其親戚以後之，授上田，官給耕牛，置學師以教之。爲存者立廟，使祀其先人，魂而有靈，吾百年之後何恨哉！」")

== Unification of northern China (202–207) ==
=== Battle of Liyang ===
Yuan Shao died of illness in the early summer of 202 and was succeeded by his third son, Yuan Shang. In autumn, Cao Cao attacked Yuan Shang and his eldest brother Yuan Tan and defeated them, forcing them to retreat and hold up inside their fortresses. In the spring of 203, Cao Cao attacked the Yuan brothers again and defeated them. In summer, he advanced towards Ye (present-day Handan, Hebei) and returned to Xuchang later, leaving behind Jia Xin (賈信) to defend Liyang County (黎陽縣; present-day Xun County, Henan). (Note: Chen and Pei 429, 1.23: "紹自軍破後，發病歐血，夏五月死。小子尚代，譚自號車騎將軍，屯黎陽。秋九月，公征之，連戰。譚、尚數敗退，固守。 八年春三月，攻其郭，乃出戰，擊，大破之，譚、尚夜遁。夏四月，進軍鄴。五月還許，留賈信屯黎陽。") Afterwards, Cao Cao issued an order establishing schools in each of his counties with 500 or more households. (Note: Chen and Pei 429, 1.24: "秋七月，令曰：「...其令郡國各修文學，縣滿五百戶置校官，選其鄉之俊造而教學之...」")

=== Defeating Yuan Shao's heirs ===
Some months after Cao Cao left northern China and returned to the south, internal conflict broke out between Yuan Shang and Yuan Tan as the brothers started fighting over Ji Province. Yuan Tan, who lost to Yuan Shang, surrendered to Cao Cao and sought his help in dealing with his third brother. Cao Cao agreed to assist Yuan Tan, so, in the winter of 203, he returned to northern China. Between spring and autumn in 204, Cao Cao attacked Yuan Shang in his base at Ye and conquered the city. Yuan Shang fled further north to Zhongshan Commandery (中山郡; around present-day Dingzhou, Hebei). After capturing Ye, Cao Cao visited Yuan Shao's tomb, weeping for his childhood friend-turned-rival, and spared no effort assuaging Yuan Shao's widow. To the delight of the people in Hebei, Cao Cao issued an order exempting them from paying taxes for that year and clamped down on the power of influential landlords in the area. When Emperor Xian offered to appoint Cao Cao as the Governor of Ji Province, Cao Cao declined, preferring to stick to his appointment as the Governor of Yan Province. (Note: Chen and Pei 429, 1.24–26: "八月，公征劉表，軍西平。公之去鄴而南也，譚、尚爭冀州，譚為尚所敗，走保平原。尚攻之急，譚遣辛毗乞降請救。諸將皆疑，荀攸勸公許之，公乃引軍還。冬十月，到黎陽，為子整與譚結婚。 ...九年春正月，濟河，遏淇水入白溝以通糧道。二月，尚復攻譚，留蘇由、審配守鄴。 ...八月，審配兄子榮夜開所守城東門內兵。配逆戰，敗，生禽配，斬之，鄴定。公臨祀紹墓，哭之流涕；慰勞紹妻，還其家人寶物，賜雜繒絮，廩食之。 ...九月，令曰：「河北罹袁氏之難，其令無出今年租賦！」重豪彊兼幷之法，百姓喜恱。天子以公領冀州牧，公讓還兖州。")

While Cao Cao was attacking Yuan Shang in Ye, Yuan Tan, who had previously allied with Cao Cao against his third brother, took over some of Yuan Shang's territories and troops for himself. Cao Cao wrote to Yuan Tan to reprimand him for not adhering to their earlier agreement. Yuan Tan became afraid so he retreated to Nanpi County. In the spring of 205, Cao Cao attacked Yuan Tan, defeated him, and executed him along with his family. Ji Province was completely pacified. Around the same time, Yuan Shang had fled to join his second brother Yuan Xi but Yuan Xi was betrayed by his subordinates Jiao Chu (焦觸) and Zhang Nan (張南), who surrendered to Cao Cao. The Yuan brothers had no choice but to head further north to take shelter under the Wuhuan tribes. (Note: Chen and Pei 429, 1.26–27: "公之圍鄴也，譚略取甘陵、安平、勃海、河閒。尚敗，還中山。譚攻之，尚奔故安，遂幷其衆。公遺譚書，責以負約，與之絕婚，女還，然後進軍。譚懼，拔平原，走保南皮。十二月，公入平原，略定諸縣。十年春正月，攻譚，破之，斬譚，誅其妻子，冀州平。 ...是月，袁熙大將焦觸、張南等叛攻熙、尚，熙、尚奔三郡烏丸。觸等舉其縣降，封為列侯。")

In the spring of 206, Cao Cao attacked Yuan Shao's maternal nephew Gao Gan, who had surrendered to him initially but rebelled later, and defeated Gao Gan at Hu Pass (壺關; in present-day Huguan County, Shanxi). In autumn, Cao Cao started a campaign against the pirates led by Guan Cheng (管承). He sent Yue Jin and Li Dian to attack Guan Cheng and pacified the eastern coast. (Note: Chen and Pei 429, 1.28: "初，袁紹以甥高幹領幷州牧，公之拔鄴，幹降，遂以為刺史。幹聞公討烏丸，乃以州叛，執上黨太守，舉兵守壺關口。遣樂進、李典擊之，幹還守壺關城。十一年春正月，公征幹。幹聞之，乃留其別將守城，走入匈奴，求救於單于，單于不受。公圍壺關三月，拔之。幹遂走荊州，上洛都尉王琰捕斬之。秋八月，公東征海賊管承，至淳于，遣樂進、李典擊破之，承走入海島。割東海之襄賁、郯、戚以益瑯邪，省昌慮郡。")

=== Campaign against the Wuhuan ===
In the summer of 206, Cao Cao received the surrender of thousands of Heishan bandits led by Zhang Yan. Around the time, Zhao Du (趙犢) and Huo Nu (霍奴) killed the Inspector of You Province and the Administrator of Zhuo Commandery (around present-day Zhuozhou, Hebei), while the Wuhuan tribes from three commanderies attacked Xianyu Fu (鮮于輔) at Guangping County (獷平縣; west of present-day Miyun District in Beijing). In early autumn, Cao Cao personally led a campaign against them and defeated Zhao Du and Huo Nu, after which his army crossed the Lu River (潞河; in present-day Tongzhou District, Beijing) to help Xianyu Fu by attacking the Wuhuan. They succeeded in driving the Wuhuan away. Cao Cao returned to Ye by winter. (Note: Chen and Pei 429, 1.27: "夏四月，黑山賊張燕率其衆十餘萬降，封為列侯。故安趙犢、霍奴等殺幽州刺史、涿郡太守。三郡烏丸攻鮮于輔於獷平。秋八月，公征之，斬犢等，乃渡潞河救獷平，烏丸奔走出塞。 ...冬十月，公還鄴。")

Throughout the period of civil wars during the late Eastern Han dynasty, the Wuhuan tribes in northern China had been taking advantage of the situation to invade You Province, capture and enslave thousands of people living in the area. When Yuan Shao had been in power in northern China, he maintained friendly ties with the Wuhuan, so Yuan Shang and Yuan Xi found refuge under the Wuhuan chieftains. In 207, Cao Cao led a campaign against the Wuhuan and the Yuan brothers and scored a decisive victory over them at the Battle of White Wolf Mountain later that year. The campaign was difficult and dangerous, and Cao Cao rewarded his counselors who had advised him against undertaking it. Yuan Shang and Yuan Xi fled further northeast to Liaodong to take shelter under the warlord Gongsun Kang. When Cao Cao's generals were preparing for an invasion of Liaodong, Cao Cao stopped them and predicted that Gongsun Kang would kill the Yuan brothers. Cao Cao was right, as Gongsun Kang arrested and executed the Yuan brothers because he sensed that they posed a threat to him. He then sent their heads to Cao Cao as a gesture of goodwill. Northern China was basically pacified and unified under Cao Cao's control by then. (Note: Chen and Pei 429, 1.28: "三郡烏丸承天下亂，破幽州，略有漢民合十餘萬戶。袁紹皆立其酋豪為單于，以家人子為己女，妻焉。遼西單于蹋頓尤彊，為紹所厚，故尚兄弟歸之，數入塞為害。公將征之，鑿渠，自呼沲入泒水，名平虜渠；又從泃河口鑿入潞河，名泉州渠，以通海。" Chen and Pei 429, 1.29–30: "將北征三郡烏丸， ...八月，登白狼山，卒與虜遇，衆甚盛。公車重在後，被甲者少，左右皆懼。公登高，望虜陳不整，乃縱兵擊之，使張遼為先鋒，虜衆大崩，斬蹋頓及名王已下，胡、漢降者二十餘萬口。遼東單于速僕丸及遼西、北平諸豪，棄其種人，與尚、熙奔遼東，衆尚有數千騎。初，遼東太守公孫康恃遠不服。及公破烏丸，或說公遂征之，尚兄弟可禽也。公曰：「吾方使康斬送尚、熙首，不煩兵矣。」九月，公引兵自柳城還，康即斬尚、熙及速僕丸等，傳其首。諸將或問：「公還而康斬送尚、熙，何也？」公曰：「彼素畏尚等，吾急之則幷力，緩之則自相圖，其勢然也。」十一月至易水，代郡烏丸行單于普富盧、上郡烏丸行單于那樓將其名王來賀。")

In the spring of 207, Cao Cao announced he would be distributing his wealth amongst those who had aided him, and enfeoffed over twenty of his followers as marquises, with lesser emoluments for the remainder. (Note: Chen and Pei 429, 1.28: "於是大封功臣二十餘人，皆爲列侯，其餘各以次受封。")

== Red Cliffs campaign (207–211) ==
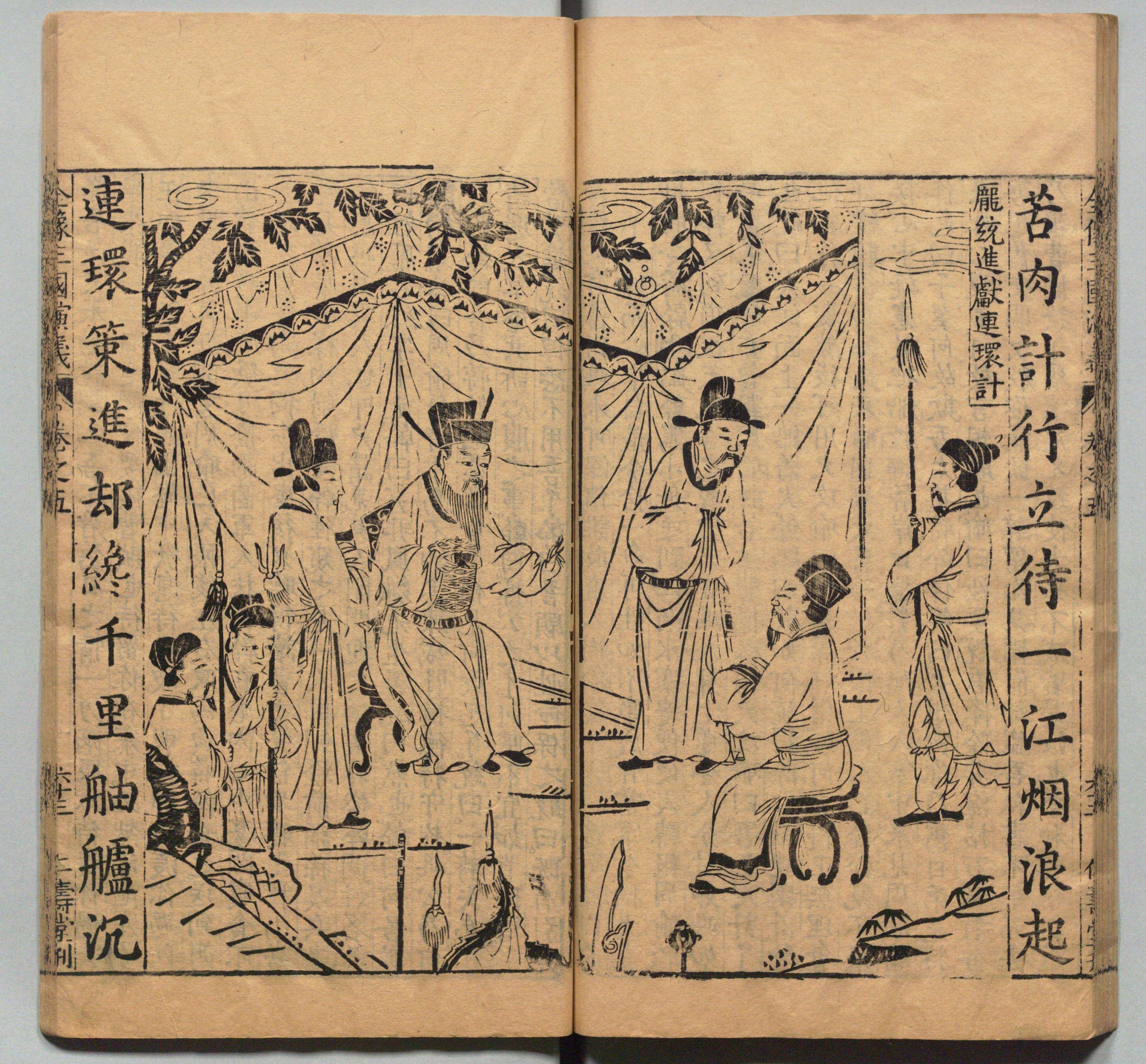
Ming dynasty woodblock print of Romance of the Three Kingdoms depicting Cao Cao, attended by his adjutants and soldiers, meeting with Pang Tong.

=== Background ===
Cao Cao returned to Ye (present-day Handan, Hebei) in the spring of 208 after pacifying northern China. He ordered the construction of Xuanwu Pool (玄武池) to train his troops in naval warfare. He also implemented changes to the political system by abolishing the Three Ducal Ministers and replacing them with the offices of the Imperial Chancellor (丞相) and Imperial Counsellor (御史大夫). (Note: The Three Ducal Ministers were the three highest ranked officials in the government of the Han dynasty and they collectively served as the heads of government. When Cao Cao abolished these three posts and replaced them with the office of the Imperial Chancellor (which he assumed shortly after), he was consolidating power so that he would become the sole head of government without having to share power with any other person.) He was officially appointed as Imperial Chancellor in July 208. (Note: Chen and Pei 429, 1.30: "十三年春正月，公還鄴，作玄武池以肄舟師。漢罷三公官，置丞相、御史大夫。夏六月，以公為丞相。") Around this time he had the famous scholar Kong Rong – later listed by Cao Cao's own son Cao Pi as one of the foremost literary talents of the age – put to death for insouciance, along with his family.

In August 208, Cao Cao launched a southern campaign to attack Liu Biao, the governor of Jing Province. Liu Biao died of illness in the following month and was succeeded by his younger son, Liu Cong. Liu Cong was stationed at Xiangyang while Liu Bei moved from Xinye County to Fancheng (樊城; present-day Fancheng District in Xiangyang, Hubei). Liu Cong surrendered in late September or October 208 when Cao Cao and his forces reached Xinye County. Liu Bei and his followers fled towards Xiakou (夏口; in present-day Wuhan) to join Liu Biao's elder son, Liu Qi. Cao Cao sent 5,000 riders to pursue Liu Bei and after covering 150 km (93 miles) in twenty-four hours they caught up with him and defeated him at the Battle of Changban. Liu Bei managed to escape and retreat safely to Xiakou with a few followers, but lost most of his supplies and equipment to the enemy. (Note: Chen and Pei 429, 32.878: "曹公以江陵有軍實，恐先主據之，乃釋輜重，輕軍到襄陽。聞先主已過，曹公將精騎五千急追之，一日一夜行三百餘里，及於當陽之長坂。先主棄妻子，與諸葛亮、張飛、趙雲等數十騎走，曹公大獲其人衆輜重。") Liu Bei later formed an alliance with the warlord Sun Quan, who controlled the territories in the Wuyue region in southern China.

Meanwhile, Cao Cao advanced towards Jiangling County and reformed Jing Province's administration. He also rewarded those who helped him gain Jing Province, including those from Liu Cong's side who persuaded Liu Cong to surrender to him. Cao Cao appointed Wen Ping, a former general under Liu Biao, as the Administrator of Jiangxia Commandery (around present-day Xinzhou District, Wuhan, Hubei) and put him in command of some of his troops. He also recruited members of the scholar-gentry in Jing Province, such as Han Song (韓嵩) and Deng Yi, to serve under him. (Note: Chen and Pei 429, 1.30: "秋七月，公南征劉表。八月，表卒，其子琮代，屯襄陽，劉備屯樊。九月，公到新野，琮遂降，備走夏口。公進軍江陵，下令荊州吏民，與之更始。乃論荊州服從之功，侯者十五人，以劉表大將文聘為江夏太守，使統本兵，引用荊州名士韓嵩、鄧義等。")

=== Battle of Red Cliffs ===
Red Cliffs campaign map, showing Cao Cao's pursuit of Liu Bei, Changban, Red Cliffs, Cao Cao's retreat and Jiangling

Liu Zhang, the Governor of Yi Province (present-day Sichuan and Chongqing), had received orders to help Cao Cao recruit soldiers from his province, so he sent the new conscripts to Jiangling County. In late December 208 or January 209, Sun Quan helped Liu Bei by attacking Cao Cao's garrison at Hefei. Around the same time, Cao Cao led his forces from Jiangling County to attack Liu Bei. When they reached Baqiu (巴丘; present-day Yueyang, Hunan), Cao Cao ordered Zhang Xi (張憙) to lead a separate army to reinforce Hefei, and Sun Quan withdrew his forces from Hefei upon receiving news of Zhang Xi's arrival. (Note: Sun Sheng commented in his Yitong Ping (異同評) that the Wu Zhi (吳志) claimed that the Battle of Hefei (208) took place after the Battle of Red Cliffs. This was contrary to what was mentioned in Cao Cao's biography (that Hefei came before Red Cliffs). Sun Sheng considered the Wu Zhi account to be the correct one. (Note: Sun Sheng, Yitong ping: "案吳志，劉備先破公軍，然後權攻合肥，而此記云權先攻合肥，後有赤壁之事。二者不同，吳志為是。" Cited in Chen and Pei 429, 1.31–32 n. 2.)) Cao Cao's forces advanced to Red Cliffs (赤壁) and engaged the allied forces of Liu Bei and Sun Quan, but lost the battle. Around that time, an epidemic disease had broken out in Cao Cao's army and many had died, so Cao Cao ordered a retreat. Liu Bei then went on to conquer the four commanderies in southern Jing Province. (Note: Chen and Pei 429, 1.30–31: "益州牧劉璋始受徵役，遣兵給軍。十二月，孫權為備攻合肥。公自江陵征備，至巴丘，遣張憙救合肥。權聞憙至，乃走。公至赤壁，與備戰，不利。於是大疫，吏士多死者，乃引軍還。備遂有荊州、江南諸郡。")

After his defeat at Red Cliffs, Cao Cao led his remaining forces through Huarong Trail (華容道; near present-day Jianli County, Hubei) as they were retreating. The area was very muddy and inaccessible and there were strong winds. Cao Cao ordered his weaker soldiers to carry straw and hay to lay out the path ahead so that his horsemen could proceed. The weaker soldiers ended up being stuck in the mud and many were trampled to death by the riders. Cao Cao expressed joy after he and his surviving men managed to get out of Huarong Trail safely, albeit suffering much losses. His generals were puzzled so they asked him why. Cao Cao remarked: "Liu Bei, my friend, doesn't think fast enough. If he had set fire earlier, we wouldn't have been able to get out alive." Liu Bei did think of setting fire but it was too late as Cao Cao had already escaped. (Note: Yue Zi, Shanyang Gong zaiji: "公船艦為備所燒，引軍從華容道步歸，遇泥濘，道不通，天又大風，悉使羸兵負草填之，騎乃得過。羸兵為人馬所蹈藉，陷泥中，死者甚衆。軍旣得出，公大喜，諸將問之，公曰：「劉備，吾儔也。但得計少晚；向使早放火，吾徒無類矣。」備尋亦放火而無所及。" Cited in Chen and Pei 429, 1.31 n. 2.)

=== After the Red Cliffs campaign ===
In the spring of 209, Cao Cao reached Qiao County (譙縣; present-day Bozhou, Anhui), where he ordered small boats to be built and staged a naval drill. In autumn, he sailed along the Huai River to the garrison at Hefei, where he issued an order for local officials to provide relief to the families of soldiers who had died in battle. He then established an administration in Yang Province and started a tuntian system in Quebei (芍陂; south of present-day Shou County, Anhui). He returned to Qiao County in winter. (Note: Chen and Pei 429, 1.32: "十四年春三月，軍至譙，作輕舟，治水軍。秋七月，自渦入淮，出肥水，軍合肥。辛未，令曰：「自頃已來，軍數征行，或遇疫氣，吏士死亡不歸，家室怨曠，百姓流離，而仁者豈樂之哉？不得已也。其令死者家無基業不能自存者，縣官勿絕廩，長吏存恤撫循，以稱吾意。」置揚州郡縣長吏，開芍陂屯田。十二月，軍還譙。")

In the winter of 210, Cao Cao had a Bronze Sparrow Platform constructed in Ye. (Note: The name of the Bronze Sparrow Platform was written as 銅爵臺; tóng jué tái instead of 銅雀臺; tóng què tái. The former has been superseded by the latter, which has become the more common term used in modern times to refer to the platform. See the dictionary definition of 銅雀臺.) (Note: Chen and Pei 429, 1.32: "[十五年]冬，作銅爵臺。") In January 211, Cao Cao wrote a long memorial – to the throne as well as to a more general audience including his detractors – declining to accept three counties awarded to him by Emperor Xian to be part of his marquisate, in which he also wrote at length about his life and ambitions. (Note: This early example of autobiographical writing, often called Cao Cao's Apologia, can be read translated in full as part of an open-access book chapter.)

In the spring of 211, Emperor Xian appointed Cao Cao's son, Cao Pi, as General of the Household for All Purposes (五官中郎將). Cao Pi had his own office and served as an assistant to his father, the Imperial Chancellor. (Note: Chen and Pei 429, 1.34: "十六年春正月，天子命公世子丕為五官中郎將，置官屬，為丞相副。") At the same time, in accordance with Cao Cao's wishes in the essay he wrote earlier, Emperor Xian reduced the number of taxable households in Cao Cao's marquisate by 5,000, and granted the three counties to three of Cao Cao's sons – Cao Zhi, Cao Ju and Cao Lin (Note: The Sanguozhi erroneously recorded his name as Cao Bao (曹豹), the Marquis of Raoyang (饒陽侯). It should be Cao Lin.) – who were enfeoffed as marquises. (Note: Book of Wei: "庚辰，天子報：減戶五千，分所讓三縣萬五千封三子，植為平原侯，據為范陽侯，豹為饒陽侯，食邑各五千戶。" Cited in Chen and Pei 429, 1.34 n. 1.)

Sometime in early 211, Shang Yao (商曜) from Taiyuan Commandery started a rebellion in Daling County (大陵縣; north of present-day Wenshui County, Shanxi). Cao Cao sent Xiahou Yuan and Xu Huang to lead an army to suppress the revolt and they achieved success. (Note: Chen and Pei 429, 1.34: "太原商曜等以大陵叛，遣夏侯淵、徐晃圍破之。")

== Battle of Tong Pass (211–213) ==
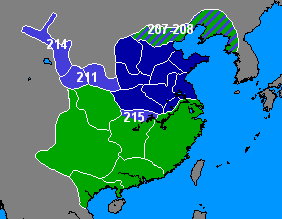
Cao Cao's territory in 206 Cao Cao's conquests 207–215 Other warlords

In early 211, Cao Cao ordered Zhong Yao and Xiahou Yuan to lead an army to attack Zhang Lu in Hanzhong Commandery. They were due to pass through the Guanzhong region along the way. The warlords in Guanzhong thought that Cao Cao was planning to attack them, so they, under the leadership of Ma Chao and Han Sui, formed a coalition known as the Guanxi Coalition (關西軍; "coalition from the west of Tong Pass") and rebelled against the Han imperial court. (Note: Chen and Pei 429, 1.34: "張魯據漢中，三月，遣鍾繇討之。公使淵等出河東與繇會。是時關中諸將疑繇欲自襲，馬超遂與韓遂、楊秋、李堪、成宜等叛。")

A few months later, Cao Cao personally led a campaign against the rebels and engaged them in battle in the areas around Tong Pass (in present-day Tongguan County, Shaanxi) and the banks of the Wei River. The first engagement took place when Cao Cao's forces were crossing the Wei River to the north bank, during which they suddenly came under attack by Ma Chao. Cao Cao and his forces headed back to the south bank later, where they constructed sand walls to keep the enemy at bay. (Note: Chen and Pei 429, 1.34: "公自潼關北渡，未濟，超赴船急戰。校尉丁斐因放牛馬以餌賊，賊亂取牛馬，公乃得渡，循河爲甬道而南。")

After some time, the rebels offered to cede territories and send a hostage to Cao Cao's side in exchange for peace. Acting on Jia Xu's suggestion, Cao Cao pretended to accept the offer to put the enemy at ease and make them lower their guard. Cao Cao later had talks with Han Sui (an old acquaintance of his) on at least two different occasions. The first time was a private conversation between them about old times, while the second time probably took place in the presence of Ma Chao and the other coalition members. Ma Chao and the others started to doubt Han Sui's allegiance, (Note: Book of Wei: "公後日復與遂等會語，諸將曰：「公與虜交語，不宜輕脫，可為木行馬以為防遏。」公然之。 ...又列鐵騎五千為十重陣，精光耀日，賊益震懼。" Cited in Chen and Pei 429, 1.36 n. 4.) especially after Han Sui received a letter from Cao Cao which contained several blotted-out words, making it seem as though the recipient had deliberately edited the letter's contents to cover up something. Cao Cao took advantage of the mutual suspicion between the rebels to launch an attack on them and defeated them. Some of the warlords were killed in battle while Han Sui and Ma Chao retreated back to Guanzhong. (Note: Chen and Pei 429, 1.34–35: "九月，進軍渡渭。 ...超等數挑戰，又不許；固請割地，求送任子，公用賈詡計，偽許之。 ...韓遂請與公相見，公與遂父同歲孝廉，又與遂同時儕輩，於是交馬語移時，不及軍事，但說京都舊故，拊手歡笑。旣罷，超等問遂：「公何言？」遂曰：「無所言也。」超等疑之。 ...他日，公又與遂書，多所點竄，如遂改定者；超等愈疑遂。公乃與克日會戰，先以輕兵挑之，戰良久，乃縱虎騎夾擊，大破之，斬成宜、李堪等。遂、超等走涼州，楊秋奔安定，關中平。")

=== Aftermath ===
Cao Cao returned to Ye (present-day Handan, Hebei) in late 211 after receiving the surrender of one of the remaining warlords, Yang Qiu. He left Xiahou Yuan behind to defend Chang'an, a major city in the Guanzhong region. Ma Chao, who had the support of the Qiang, Di and other tribal peoples in western China, continued to ravage Guanzhong and attack Cao Cao's territories. In 213, he killed Wei Kang, the Inspector of Liang Province, seized control of the province, and forced Wei Kang's subordinates to submit to him. In late 213, Zhao Qu (趙衢), Yin Feng (尹奉) and several other officials in Liang Province rebelled against Ma Chao and drove him out of Guanzhong. With aid from Zhang Lu, Ma Chao returned and struck back at his enemies, but was defeated when Xiahou Yuan led reinforcements from Chang'an to assist Zhao Qu and his allies. Xiahou Yuan later attacked the remnants of the Guanxi Coalition (including Han Sui) and the various tribes in western China and forced them to surrender. He also eliminated Song Jian (宋建), who had rebelled against the Han government and set up a small kingdom in Fuhan County (枹罕縣; southwest of present-day Linxia County, Gansu). (Note: Chen and Pei 429, 1.36: "冬十月，軍自長安北征楊秋，圍安定。秋降... 十二月，自安定還，留夏侯淵屯長安。... 馬超餘衆梁興等屯藍田，使夏侯淵擊平之。" Chen and Pei 429, 1.42: "馬超在漢陽，復因羌、胡為害，氐王千萬叛應超，屯興國。使夏侯淵討之。十九年春正月... 南安趙衢、漢陽尹奉等討超，梟其妻子，超奔漢中。韓遂徙金城，入氐王千萬部，率羌、胡萬餘騎與夏侯淵戰，擊，大破之，遂走西平。淵與諸將攻興國，屠之。省安東、永陽郡。" Chen and Pei 429, 1.44: "初，隴西宋建自稱河首平漢王，聚衆枹罕，改元，置百官，三十餘年。遣夏侯淵自興國討之。冬十月，屠枹罕，斬建，涼州平。")

== Wars with Sun Quan (213–217) ==
In early 213, Cao Cao led an army to attack Sun Quan at Ruxu (濡須; north of present-day Wuwei County, Anhui, along the Yangtze River). During the battle, Cao Cao's forces destroyed Sun Quan's camp on the west bank of the Yangtze and captured Gongsun Yang (公孫陽), an area commander under Sun Quan. However, overall, both sides did not make any significant gains in the battle. (Note: Chen and Pei 429, 1.37: "[十七年]冬十月，公征孫權。十八年春正月，進軍濡須口，攻破權江西營，獲權都督公孫陽，乃引軍還。")

In mid-214, Cao Cao launched another campaign against Sun Quan against the advice of Fu Gan, one of his advisers. Just like in the previous campaign, he did not make any significant gains so he retreated. In the following year, Sun Quan led his forces to attack Hefei, a heavily fortified city guarded by Cao Cao's generals Zhang Liao, Li Dian and Yue Jin, leading to the Battle of Xiaoyao Ford. Zhang Liao and the defenders inflicted a devastating defeat on Sun Quan and his forces. (Note: Chen and Pei 429, 1.43–45: "[十九年]秋七月，公征孫權。 ...公自合肥還。 ...[二十年]八月，孫權圍合肥，張遼、李典擊破之。")

In the winter of 216, Cao Cao staged a military drill in Ye (present-day Handan, Hebei), during which he personally beat a war drum to direct his troops' movements and boost their morale. (Note: Book of Wei: "王親執金鼔以令進退。" Cited in Chen and Pei 429, 1.49 n. 1 (first n. 1).) After the drill, he launched another campaign against Sun Quan and arrived in Juchao (居巢; in present-day Chaohu, Anhui) by spring in the following year. In late March or April 217, he ordered his troops to make camp at the Hao Gorge (郝谿) on the west bank of the Yangtze. Sun Quan had constructed a dock and stationed defences at Ruxu. Both sides clashed at Ruxu and the battle ended with an inconclusive result. Cao Cao withdrew his forces in late April or May 217, leaving behind Xiahou Dun, Cao Ren, Zhang Liao and others to defend Juchao. (Note: Chen and Pei 429, 1.49: "[二十一年]冬十月，治兵，遂征孫權，十一月至譙。二十二年春正月，王軍居巢，二月，進軍屯江西郝谿。權在濡須口築城拒守，遂逼攻之，權退走。三月，王引軍還，留夏侯惇、曹仁、張遼等屯居巢。")

== Campaign against Zhang Lu (215) ==
In early 215, Cao Cao launched a campaign against Zhang Lu in Hanzhong Commandery. He first sent Zhang He, Zhu Ling and others to lead an army to attack the Di tribes blocking the way in Wudu Commandery (武都郡; around present-day Longnan, Gansu). They defeated and massacred the Di population in Hechi County (河池縣; northwest of present-day Pingliang, Gansu). (Note: Chen and Pei 429, 1.45: "[二十年]三月，公西征張魯，至陳倉，將自武都入氐；氐人塞道，先遣張郃、朱靈等攻破之。夏四月，公自陳倉以出散關，至河池。氐王竇茂衆萬餘人，恃險不服，五月，公攻屠之。西平、金城諸將麴演、蔣石等共斬送韓遂首。")

By mid 215, Cao Cao's army reached Yangping Pass (陽平關; in present-day Ningqiang County, Shaanxi) after making a long and arduous journey across mountainous terrain. When his soldiers started complaining, Cao Cao announced that he would remember them for their contributions to encourage them to move on. (Note: Book of Wei: "軍自武都山行千里，升降險阻，軍人勞苦；公於是大饗，莫不忘其勞。" Cited in Chen and Pei 429, 1.45 n. 2.) Zhang Lu ordered his younger brother Zhang Wei (張衛) and subordinate Yang Ang (楊昂) to lead troops to defend the pass, making use of the mountainous terrain to counter Cao Cao's advances. Cao Cao was unable to overcome the enemy after launching assaults so he withdrew to put them off guard. One night, Cao Cao secretly ordered Xie Biao (解𢢼) and Gao Zuo (高祚) to lead a sneak attack on Yangping Pass. Zhang Lu retreated to Bazhong, when he heard that Yangping Pass had been taken. Cao Cao proceeded to occupy Nanzheng County, the capital of Hanzhong Commandery. (Note: Chen and Pei 429, 1.45: "秋七月，公至陽平。張魯使弟衞與將楊昂等據陽平關，橫山築城十餘里，攻之不能拔，乃引軍還。賊見大軍退，其守備解散。公乃密遣解忄剽、高祚等乘險夜襲，大破之，斬其將楊任，進攻衞，衞等夜遁，魯潰奔巴中。公軍入南鄭，盡得魯府庫珍寶。")

After taking control of Hanzhong Commandery, Cao Cao made some administrative changes to the commandery, such as redrawing boundaries and appointing some administrators to govern the newly formed commanderies. In late 215, Zhang Lu led his followers out of Bazhong and voluntarily submitted to Cao Cao, who accepted his surrender and granted him a marquis title. Around the time, Liu Bei had recently seized control of Yi Province (present-day Sichuan and Chongqing) from its governor Liu Zhang and occupied Bazhong after Zhang Lu left. Cao Cao ordered Zhang He to lead a force to attack Liu Bei, but Zhang He lost to Liu Bei's general Zhang Fei at the Battle of Baxi. About a month after Zhang Lu's surrender, Cao Cao left Nanzheng County and headed back to Ye (present-day Handan, Hebei), leaving behind Xiahou Yuan to guard Hanzhong Commandery. (Note: Chen and Pei 429, 1.45–46: "巴、漢皆降。復漢寧郡為漢中；分漢中之安陽、西城為西城郡，置太守；分錫、上庸郡，置都尉。 ...九月，巴七姓夷王朴胡、賨邑侯杜濩舉巴夷、賨民來附，於是分巴郡，以胡為巴東太守，濩為巴西太守，皆封列侯。天子命公承制封拜諸侯守相。 ...十一月，魯自巴中將其餘衆降。封魯及五子皆為列侯。劉備襲劉璋，取益州，遂據巴中；遣張郃擊之。十二月，公自南鄭還，留夏侯淵屯漢中。")

== War with Liu Bei in Hanzhong (217–219) ==
In the winter of 217, Liu Bei sent Zhang Fei, Ma Chao, Wu Lan (吳蘭) and others to garrison at Xiabian (下辯; northwest of present-day Cheng County, Gansu). Cao Cao ordered Cao Hong to lead an army to resist the enemy. In the spring of 218, Cao Hong defeated Wu Lan and killed his deputy Ren Kui (任夔). In April or May 218, Zhang Fei and Ma Chao retreated from Hanzhong Commandery while Wu Lan was killed by Qiangduan (強端), a Di chieftain from Yinping Commandery (陰平郡; around present-day Wen County, Gansu). (Note: Chen and Pei 429, 1.50–51: "[二十二年冬] 劉備遣張飛、馬超、吳蘭等屯下辯；遣曹洪拒之。二十三年春... 曹洪破吳蘭，斬其將任夔等。三月，張飛、馬超走漢中，陰平氐強端斬吳蘭，傳其首。")

In August or early September 218, Cao Cao staged a military drill and launched a campaign against Liu Bei. His army reached Chang'an in October. In the meantime, Liu Bei's forces had already engaged Cao Cao's forces, under Xiahou Yuan's command, in Hanzhong Commandery. In early 219, Xiahou Yuan was killed in action at the Battle of Mount Dingjun against Liu Bei's general Huang Zhong. In April 219, Cao Cao led his forces from Yangping Pass (陽平關; in present-day Ningqiang County, Shaanxi) towards Hanzhong via Xie Valley (斜谷). Liu Bei made use of the geographical advantage he had – mountainous terrain – to hold off Cao Cao. (Note: Chen and Pei 429, 1.51–52: "秋七月，治兵，遂西征劉備，九月，至長安。 ...夏侯淵與劉備戰於陽平，為備所殺。三月，王自長安出斜谷，軍遮要以臨漢中，遂至陽平。備因險拒守。") That July, Cao Cao withdrew his forces back to Chang'an. (Note: Chen and Pei 429, 1.52: "夏五月，引軍還長安。")

== Battle of Fancheng (219–220) ==
In the autumn of 219, Cao Cao ordered Yu Jin to lead seven armies to reinforce Cao Ren, who was under siege by Guan Yu at Fancheng. However, due to heavy rains, the Han River burst its banks and the seven armies were destroyed in the flood. Guan Yu captured Yu Jin, executed his subordinate Pang De, and continued to press on the attack on Cao Ren. Cao Cao ordered Xu Huang to lead another army to help Cao Ren. (Note: Chen and Pei 429, 1.52: "秋七月， ...遣于禁助曹仁擊關羽。八月，漢水溢，灌禁軍，軍沒，羽獲禁，遂圍仁。使徐晃救之。") At the same time, Cao Cao also contemplated relocating the imperial capital from Xuchang further north into Hebei to avoid Guan Yu, but Sima Yi and Jiang Ji told him that Sun Quan would become restless when he heard of Guan Yu's victory. They suggested to Cao Cao to ally with Sun Quan and enlist his help in hindering Guan Yu's advances. In return, Cao Cao would recognise the legitimacy of Sun Quan's claim over the territories in Jiangdong. In this way, the siege on Fancheng would automatically be lifted. Cao Cao heeded their suggestion. (Note: Chen and Pei 429, 36.941: "曹公議徙許都以避其銳，司馬宣王、蔣濟以為關羽得志，孫權必不願也。可遣人勸權躡其後，許割江南以封權，則樊圍自解。曹公從之。")

Cao Cao arrived in Luoyang early in the winter of 219 after returning from campaign in Hanzhong. He later led an army from Luoyang to relieve Cao Ren, but turned back before reaching his destination upon receiving news that Xu Huang had defeated Guan Yu and lifted the siege on Fancheng. (Note: Chen and Pei 429, 1.52: "冬十月，軍還洛陽。 ...孫權遣使上書，以討關羽自效。王自洛陽南征羽，未至，晃攻羽，破之，羽走，仁圍解。王軍摩陂。") In the spring of 220, Cao Cao returned to Luoyang and remained there. In the meantime, Sun Quan had sent his general Lü Meng and others to launch a stealth assault on Liu territories in Jing Province while Guan Yu was on the Fancheng campaign, and they succeeded in conquering Guan Yu's key bases in Gong'an County and Jiangling County. Guan Yu, having lost his bases and forced to withdraw from Fancheng, was eventually surrounded by Sun Quan's forces and captured in an ambush and executed. Sun Quan sent Guan Yu's head to Cao Cao, (Note: Chen and Pei 429, 1.53: "二十五年春正月，至洛陽。權擊斬羽，傳其首。") who arranged a noble's funeral for Guan Yu and had his head buried with full honours. (Note: Hu Chong, Wu Li: "權送羽首於曹公，以諸侯禮葬其屍骸。" Cited in Chen and Pei 429, 36.942 n. 3.)

== Titles of nobility (213–220) ==
=== Duke of Wei ===
Cao Cao returned to Ye in the spring of 212 after the Battle of Tong Pass. Emperor Xian granted him special privileges similar to those awarded to Xiao He by Emperor Gao. Cao Cao did not have to have his name announced, did not have to walk in quickly, and had permission to carry a ceremonial sword and wear shoes when he entered the imperial court. Fourteen counties from five different commanderies were segregated from their respective commanderies and placed under the jurisdiction of Wei Commandery (around present-day Handan, Hebei). (Note: Chen and Pei 429, 1.36: "[建安]十七年春正月，公還鄴。天子命公贊拜不名，入朝不趨，劔履上殿，如蕭何故事。 ...割河內之蕩陰、朝歌、林慮，東郡之衞國、頓丘、東武陽、發干，鉅鹿之廮陶、曲周、南和，廣平之任城，趙之襄國、邯鄲、易陽以益魏郡。" The 1st month of the 17th year of Jian'an corresponds to 20 Feb to 20 Mar 212 in the Julian calendar.)

In 213, after Cao Cao returned from the Battle of Ruxu against Sun Quan, Emperor Xian issued a decree abolishing the fourteen provinces system and replacing it with an older nine provinces system. About a month after Cao Cao returned to Ye, Emperor Xian sent Chi Lü as an emissary to enfeoff Cao Cao as the Duke of Wei (魏公). After Cao Cao refused the customary three times, the emperor sent a thirty-person delegation of officials to make a fourth offer of enfeoffment, which was accepted. (Note: Book of Wei: "前後三讓。於是中軍師陵樹亭侯荀攸...等勸進... 公乃受命。" Cited in Chen and Pei 429, 1.40–41 n. 9.) In August 213, an ancestral temple and the sheji (altars for worshipping the gods of soil and grain) were built in Cao Cao's dukedom. Later, Emperor Xian sent a six-person delegation led by high ranking government minister Wang Yi (王邑) to present betrothal gifts of jade, silk, and other precious items to Cao Cao as part of an arrangement for three of Cao Cao's daughters to become the emperor's concubines: Cao Jie, Cao Hua, and Cao Xian. (Note: Xiandi qiju zhu: "使使持節行太常大司農安陽亭侯王邑，齎璧、帛、玄纁、絹五萬匹之鄴納娉，介者五人，皆以議郎行大夫事，副介一人。" Cited in Chen and Pei 429, 1.42 n. 1.) (Note: Chen and Pei 429, 1.37: "十八年春正月... 詔書幷十四州，復為九州。夏四月，至鄴。五月丙申，天子使御史大夫郗慮持節策命公為魏公". Chen and Pei 429, 1.42: "秋七月，始建魏社稷宗廟。天子娉公三女為貴人，少者待年于國。") It is to be understood that these grants of honours, titles, prerogatives, and imperial marriage arrangements were not of the emperor's own initiative, but orchestrated by Cao Cao and his staff, who controlled the Imperial Secretariat. As early as the Book of the Later Han, few historians offer Cao Cao the veneer of legitimacy in his appointments and enfeoffments, forgoing mention of the emperor and instead describing the actions as a personal decision.

In October 213, Cao Cao ordered the construction of the Golden Tiger Platform (金虎臺) and a watercourse linking the Zhang River and White Canal (白溝). A month later, he divided Wei Commandery into the east and west divisions, each governed by a Commandant. In December, he established a ducal secretariat in his fief along with the offices of Palace Attendants and the Six Ministers. (Note: Chen and Pei 429, 1.42: "九月，作金虎臺，鑿渠引漳水入白溝以通河。冬十月，分魏郡為東西部，置都尉。十一月，初置尚書、侍中、六卿。")

Depiction of a yuanyou guan, an authoritative hat granted to Cao Cao by Emperor Xian

In late January or February 214, Cao Cao attended a ceremony, known as ji li (籍禮), to promote agriculture. (Note: In ancient China, emperors and nobles would recruit peasants to help them work their personal farming plots. The emperor owned 1,000 mu of land while a noble owned 100 mu. The ji li (籍禮) was a ceremony during which the emperor or the noble would use a plow to lift the soil three times or turn the soil over once. This was a symbolic move to show that the emperor or noble was concerned about agriculture and served as a role model for peasants to follow.) In late March or April, Emperor Xian sent Yang Xuan (楊宣) and Pei Mao (裴茂) as emissaries (Note: Xiandi qiju zhu: "使左中郎將楊宣、亭侯裴茂持節、印授之。 Cited in Chen and Pei 429, 1.43 n. 1 (second n. 1).) to present Cao Cao with a golden official seal with a red ribbon and a yuanyou guan (遠遊冠), (Note: A yuanyou guan (遠遊冠) was a type of ceremonial headgear. Cao Cao is depicted wearing a yuanyou guan in the picture in the infobox above.) placing Cao (who was still only a duke then) in a position above other nobles. (Note: Chen and Pei 429, 1.42–43: "十九年春正月，始耕籍田。 ...[十九年]三月，天子使魏公位在諸侯王上，改授金璽，赤紱、遠遊冠。")

In December 214 or January 215, Empress Fu Shou wrote a secret letter to her father Fu Wan (伏完) to tell him that Emperor Xian resented Cao Cao for the execution of Dong Cheng. The contents of the letter were hateful. The incident was exposed and Empress Fu was deposed and executed, her family exiled. (Note: Chen and Pei 429, 1.44: "[十九年]十一月，漢皇后伏氏坐昔與父故屯騎校尉完書，云帝以董承被誅怨恨公，辭甚醜惡，發聞，后廢黜死，兄弟皆伏法。")

In January or February 215, Cao Cao went to Meng Ford (孟津), a historically important spot near the site of the ancient Battle of Muye. Emperor Xian allowed him to make a maotou (旄頭; a banner decorated with animals' tails, typically reserved for the emperor) and erect a zhongju (鍾虡; a bell pendant stand) in his ducal palace. Cao Cao later issued two official statements and established a licaoyuan (理曹掾; a justice ministry). (Note: Chen and Pei 429, 1.44: "十二月，公至孟津。天子命公置旄頭，宮殿設鍾虡。...於是置理曹掾屬。")

In the spring of 215, Emperor Xian instated Cao Cao's daughter, Cao Jie, as the new empress. Cao Cao visited four commanderies and merged them into a new commandery – Xinxing Commandery (新興郡; 'The Newly Rising Commandery') – with one of the counties as the commandery capital. In winter, while he was away in Hanzhong Commandery, Cao Cao created the titles of the Five Counsellors and nominal marquis titles for the first time, alongside the original six grades of marquis ranks. (Note: There were 18 grades for nominal marquis titles and 17 grades for guanzhong marquises; holders of these titles each had a golden seal with a purple ribbon attached. There were 16 grades for guannei (關內) and guanwai (關外) marquises; holders of these titles each had a bronze seal with a handle carved in the shape of a tortoise and with a black ribbon attached. There were 15 grades for the Five Counsellors; holders of these titles each had a bronze seal with a handle carved in the shape of a jade ring and with a black ribbon attached. All the bearers of these titles did not have any fiefs with taxable households; they possessed only honorary titles. These new titles were created in addition to the preexisting marquises ranks which were divided into six grades. (Note: Book of Wei: "置名號侯爵十八級，關中侯爵十七級，皆金印紫綬；又置關內外侯十六級，銅印龜紐墨綬；五大夫十五級，銅印環紐，亦墨綬，皆不食租，與舊列侯關內侯凡六等。" Cited in Chen and Pei 429, 1.46 n. 1 (second n. 1).) The historian Pei Songzhi believed that Cao Cao started the practice of conferring honorary titles in the late Eastern Han dynasty, (Note: Pei Songzhi in Chen and Pei 429, 1.46 n. 1 (second n. 1): "臣松之以為今之虛封蓋自此始。") but see also Ranged Marquis.) These new titles were awarded to Cao Cao's men who had made contributions in battle during the campaign against Zhang Lu, as Cao Cao had promised them earlier. (Note: Chen and Pei 429, 1.45–46: "二十年春正月，天子立公中女為皇后。省雲中、定襄、五原、朔方郡，郡置一縣領其民，合以為新興郡。 ...[二十年]冬十月，始置名號侯至五大夫，與舊列侯、關內侯凡六等，以賞軍功。")

In February or early March 216, Cao Cao returned to Ye (present-day Handan, Hebei) after a successful campaign against Zhang Lu in Hanzhong Commandery. (Note: Chen and Pei 429, 1.47: "二十一年春二月，公還鄴。") Two months later, he attended another ji li (籍禮) ceremony. (Note: Chen and Pei 429, 1.47: "三月壬寅，公親耕籍田。")

=== King of Wei ===
In June 216, Emperor Xian promoted Cao Cao from a duke to a vassal king under the title "King of Wei" (魏王). Cao Cao summoned Sima Fang, who had recommended him to be the Commandant of the North District in Luoyang early in his career, to meet him in Ye, where they had a chat. (Note: See Sima Fang#Relationship with Cao Cao for details.) Later, the Wuhuan chanyu Pufulu (普富盧) from Dai Commandery (northwest of present-day Yu County, Hebei) led his various subjects to Ye to pay tribute to Cao Cao. Around the same time, Emperor Xian instated one of Cao Cao's daughters as a princess and granted her a fief with some taxable households. In August 216, the Southern Xiongnu chanyu Huchuquan brought along his subjects to pay tribute to Cao Cao, who treated them like guests. Huchuquan remained in Cao Cao's vassal kingdom while the former Southern Xiongnu domain in Bing province was reorganized into the "Five Divisions" (五部) and placed under the supervision of Huchuquan's uncle, Qubei. In September, Cao Cao promoted Zhong Yao from the position of Grand Judge (大理) under the Han central government to the Royal Chancellor (相國) of his vassal kingdom. (Note: Chen and Pei 429, 1.47: "夏五月，天子進公爵為魏王。代郡烏丸行單于普富盧與其侯王來朝。天子命王女為公主，食湯沐邑。秋七月，匈奴南單于呼廚泉將其名王來朝，待以客禮，遂留魏，使右賢王去卑監其國。八月，以大理鍾繇為相國。") He also established the offices of the Minister of Ancestral Ceremonies (奉常) and Minister of the Royal Clan (宗正) in his vassal kingdom. (Note: Book of Wei: "始置奉常宗正官。" Cited in Chen and Pei 429, 1.49 n. 4.)

In late May or June 217, Emperor Xian allowed Cao Cao to have his personal jingqi (旌旗; a banner) and have imperial guards clear the path when Cao travelled around. In late June or July, Cao Cao had a pangong (泮宮) (Note: A pangong (泮宮) was an educational institution for the sons of nobles and aristocrats.) constructed. In July or August, Hua Xin was appointed as Imperial Counsellor (御史大夫). Cao Cao also established the office of the Minister of the Guards (衞尉) in his vassal kingdom. (Note: Book of Wei: "初置衞尉官。" Cited in Chen and Pei 429, 1.49 n. 1 (second n. 1).) In November or December, Emperor Xian granted more ceremonial privileges to Cao Cao: have twelve fringes of pearls on his crown; ride in a golden carriage pulled by six horses; have five other carriages to accompany his main carriage when he travelled around. Cao Cao's son, Cao Pi, who was serving as General of the Household for All Purposes (五官中郎將) in the Han imperial court, was designated as the Crown Prince (太子) of Cao Cao's vassal kingdom. (Note: Chen and Pei 429, 1.49: "[二十二年]夏四月，天子命王設天子旌旗，出入稱警蹕。五月，作泮宮。六月，以軍師華歆為御史大夫。冬十月，天子命王冕十有二旒，乘金根車，駕六馬，設五時副車，以五官中郎將丕為魏太子。")

In February or early March 218, the imperial physician Ji Ben, along with Geng Ji (耿紀), Wei Huang (韋晃) and others, started a rebellion in the imperial capital Xuchang and attacked the camp of Wang Bi (王必), a chief clerk under Cao Cao. Wang Bi suppressed the revolt with the aid of Yan Kuang (嚴匡), an Agriculture General of the Household (典農中郎將). (Note: Chen and Pei 429, 1.50: "二十三年春正月，漢太醫令吉本與少府耿紀、司直韋晃等反，攻許，燒丞相長史王必營，必與潁川典農中郎將嚴匡討斬之。")

In late July or August 219, Cao Cao designated his formal spouse, Lady Bian, as his queen consort. (Note: Chen and Pei 429, 1.52: "秋七月，以夫人卞氏為王后。") Some months later, Sun Quan wrote to Cao Cao, expressing his desire to submit to Cao Cao and urging Cao Cao to take the throne from Emperor Xian. Cao Cao showed Sun Quan's letter to his subordinates and remarked: "This kid wants me to put myself on top of a fire!" Chen Qun, Huan Jie and Xiahou Dun also urged Cao Cao to usurp the imperial throne from Emperor Xian, but Cao Cao refused. (Note: Yu 265: "孫權上書稱臣，稱說天命。王以權書示外曰：「是兒欲踞吾著爐火上邪！」侍中陳羣、尚書桓階奏曰：「漢自安帝已來，政去公室，國統數絕，至於今者，唯有名號，尺土一民，皆非漢有，期運久已盡，歷數久已終，非適今日也。是以桓、靈之閒，諸明圖緯者，皆言『漢行氣盡，黃家當興』。殿下應期，十分天下而有其九，以服事漢，羣生注望，遐邇怨歎，是故孫權在遠稱臣，此天人之應，異氣齊聲。臣愚以為虞、夏不以謙辭，殷、周不吝誅放，畏天知命，無所與讓也。」" Cited in Chen and Pei 429, 1.52–53 n. 2.) (Note: Sun Sheng, Wei Shi Chunqiu: "夏侯惇謂王曰：「天下咸知漢祚已盡，異代方起。自古已來，能除民害為百姓所歸者，即民主也。今殿下即戎三十餘年，功德著於黎庶，為天下所依歸，應天順民，復何疑哉！」王曰：「『施于有政，是亦為政』。若天命在吾，吾為周文王矣。」" Cited in Chen and Pei 429, 1.53 n. 2.)

== Death and burial (220) ==
Cao Cao died on 15 March 220 in Luoyang at the age of 66 (by East Asian age reckoning). He was granted the posthumous title "King Wu" (武王; "martial king") by Emperor Xian. His will instructed that he be buried near Ximen Bao's tomb in Ye without gold and jade treasures, and that his subjects on duty at the frontier were to stay in their posts and not attend the funeral as, in his own words, "the country is still unstable". (Note: Chen and Pei 429, 1.53: "遺令曰：「天下尚未安定，未得遵古也。葬畢，皆除服。其將兵屯戍者，皆不得離屯部。有司各率乃職。斂以時服，無藏金玉珍寶。」") He was buried on 11 April 220 in the Gaoling (高陵; "high mausoleum"). (Note: Chen and Pei 429, 1.53: "庚子，王崩于洛陽，年六十六。 ...謚曰武王。二月丁卯，葬高陵。") In December 220 or early January 221, after Cao Pi forced Emperor Xian to abdicate the throne in his favour and established the state of Cao Wei, he granted his father the posthumous title "Emperor Wu" (武皇帝; "Martial Emperor") and the temple name "Taizu" (太祖; "Grand Ancestor"). (Note: Zizhi Tongjian 1084, volume 69: "十一月，癸酉，奉漢帝為山陽公，行漢正朔，用天子禮樂；封公四子為列侯。追尊太王曰太皇帝；武王曰武皇帝，廟號太祖；尊王太后曰皇太后。")

=== Cao Cao Mausoleum ===
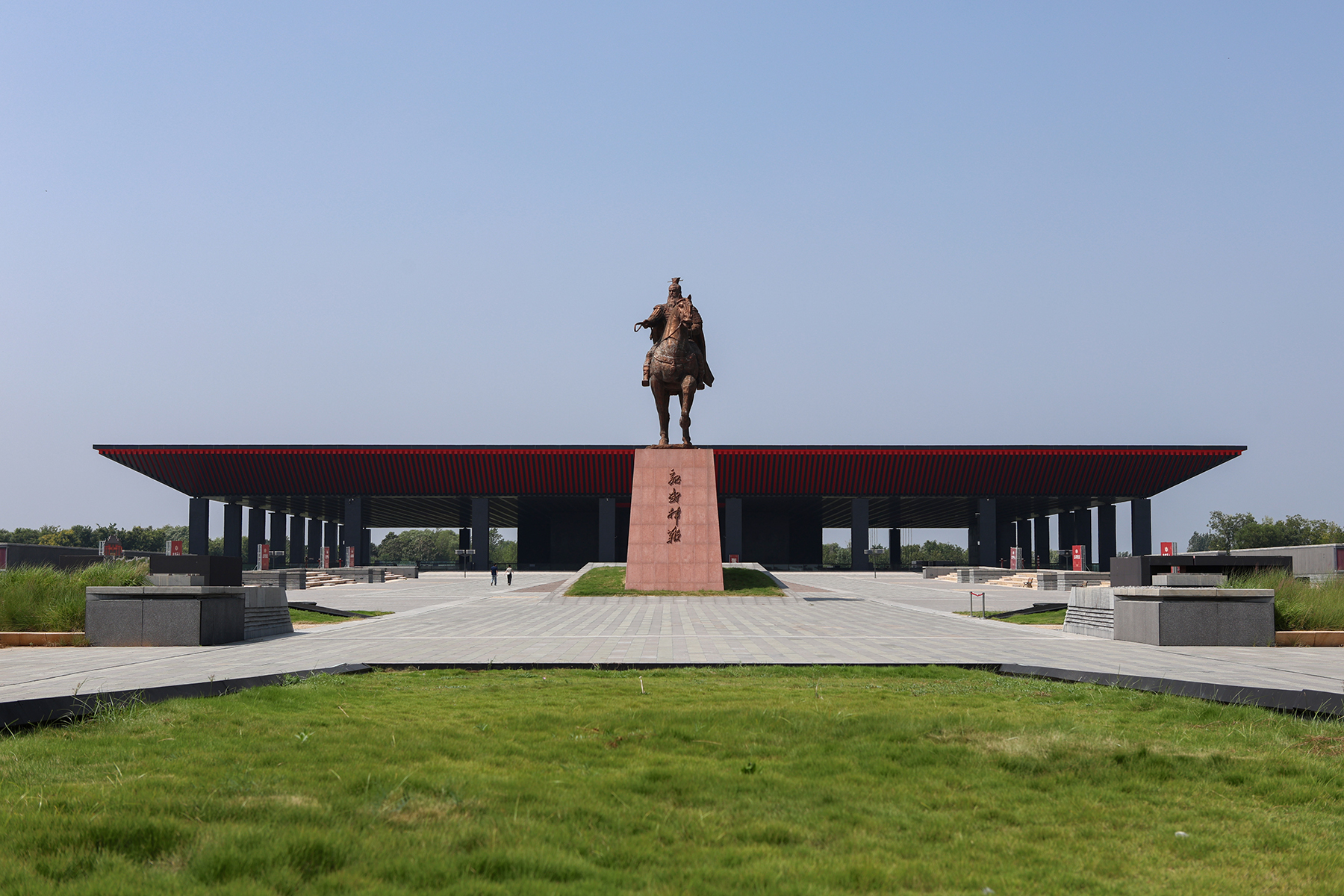
The Cao Cao Mausoleum Museum in Anyang, Henan

On 27 December 2009, the Henan Provincial Cultural Heritage Bureau reported the discovery of Cao Cao's tomb in Xigaoxue Village, Anyang County, Henan. The tomb, covering an area of 740 square metres, was discovered in December 2008 when workers at a nearby kiln were digging for mud to make bricks. Its discovery was not reported and the local authorities knew of it only when they seized a stone tablet carrying the inscription 'King Wu of Wei' – Cao Cao's posthumous title – from grave robbers who claimed to have stolen it from the tomb. Over the following year, archaeologists recovered more than 250 relics from the tomb. The remains of three persons – a man in his 60s, a woman in her 50s and another woman in her 20s – were also unearthed.

Since the discovery of the tomb, there have been many sceptics and experts who pointed out problems with it and raised doubts about its authenticity. In January 2010, the State Administration of Cultural Heritage legally endorsed the initial results from research conducted throughout 2009 suggesting that the tomb was Cao Cao's. However, in August 2010, 23 experts and scholars presented evidence at a forum held in Suzhou to argue that the findings and the artefacts of the tomb were fake. In 2010, archaeologist Zhang Guo'an published a book positing that the tomb and the adjacent one actually belonged to Cao Huan (a grandson of Cao Cao) and his father Cao Yu. With the release of the formal archaeological report about the tomb in 2016, the academic community had moved on from the identity debate and went on to study the tomb with the understanding that it does indeed belong to Cao Cao.

In 2010, the tomb became part of the fifth batch of Major Historical and Cultural Sites Protected at the National Level in China. A museum was opened at the site in April 2023.

== Family ==
According to historical records, Cao Cao had 15 wives and concubines, 25 sons, six daughters and two adopted sons. His first formal spouse was Lady Ding, who raised his eldest son Cao Ang (born to his concubine Lady Liu). She fell out with him after Cao Ang's death and effectively separated from him. After Lady Ding left him, Cao Cao designated Lady Bian, one of his concubines, as his new formal spouse and she remained in this position permanently. Among Cao Cao's sons (excluding Cao Ang), the more notable ones are Cao Pi, Cao Zhang, Cao Zhi and Cao Chong, who were, at different points in time, considered as potential candidates to succeed their father. Cao Chong, who was born to Lady Huan, was a child prodigy who devised a method of weighing an elephant by using the principle of buoyancy. Cao Chong died prematurely at the age of 12. Cao Pi, Cao Zhang and Cao Zhi were born to Lady Bian and were known for their individual talents: Cao Pi and Cao Zhi were noted as brilliant writers and poets; Cao Zhang inherited his father's military skills. Cao Pi eventually overcame his two younger brothers in a succession struggle and was chosen to be his father's heir apparent. Three of Cao Cao's daughters – Cao Xian, Cao Jie and Cao Hua – were married to Emperor Xian. Cao Cao's two adopted sons, Qin Lang and He Yan, were conceived from his concubines' previous marriages.

=== Research on Cao Cao's ancestry ===
Cao Cao was a purported descendant of Cao Shen, a statesman of the early Western Han. In the early 2010s, researchers from Fudan University compared the Y chromosomes collected from a tooth from Cao Cao's granduncle, Cao Ding (曹鼎), with those of Cao Shen and found them to be significantly different. Therefore, the claim about Cao Cao descending from Cao Shen was not supported by genetic evidence. The researchers also found that the Y chromosomes of Cao Ding match those of self-proclaimed living descendants of Cao Cao who hold lineage records dating back to more than 100 generations ago.

Zhu Ziyan, a history professor from Shanghai University, argued that Cao Ding's tooth alone cannot be used as evidence to determine Cao Cao's ancestry. He was sceptical about whether those who claim to be Cao Cao's descendants are really so because genealogical records dating from the Song dynasty (960–1279) are already so rare in the present day, much less those dating from the Three Kingdoms era (220–280). Besides, according to historical records, Cao Ding was a younger brother of the eunuch Cao Teng, who adopted Cao Cao's biological father, Cao Song. Therefore, Cao Cao had no blood relations with Cao Ding; i.e., Cao Ding was not Cao Cao's real granduncle. Zhu Ziyan mentioned that Fudan University's research only proves that those self-proclaimed descendants of Cao Cao are related to Cao Ding; it does not directly relate them to Cao Cao.

== Personal life ==
Cao Cao was known to be frugal and modest in his daily life, showing no particular interest in aesthetic appeal. The clothes and shoes he wore at home were plain and simple. When the folding screens and curtains in his house were damaged, he simply had them mended instead of replaced. He relied on only mattresses and blankets for warmth, and had no decorative ornaments at home. (Note: Book of Wei: "雅性節儉，不好華麗，後宮衣不錦繡，侍御履不二采，帷帳屏風，壞則補納，茵蓐取溫，無有緣飾。" Cited in Chen and Pei 429, 1.54 n. 2.) When he met guests, he wore a simple hat and clothes made of raw silk and had a pouch containing a handkerchief and other small items attached to his belt. Outside of his work life, Cao Cao was known to behave in a frivolous and carefree manner. When he chatted with people, he spoke casually, occasionally poked fun at others, and shared everything on his mind. Once, during a meal, he was so amused that he laughed until he knocked his head into the dishes and soiled his face and clothing. (Note: Cao Man zhuan: "被服輕綃，身自佩小鞶囊，以盛手巾細物，時或冠帢帽以見賓客。每與人談論，戲弄言誦，盡無所隱，及歡恱大笑，至以頭沒柸案中，肴膳皆沾汙巾幘，其輕易如此。" Cited in Chen and Pei 429, 1.54–55 n. 2.)

Cao Cao's low regard for material wealth influenced not only his personal life, but also his political and military careers and other aspects of his life. In the late Eastern Han dynasty, headclothes known as fujin, especially those made of silk, became popular among the scholar-gentry and upper class because they felt that wearing a fujin made one look cultured and refined. Cao Cao, however, disapproved of wearing expensive headgear as he felt that the country lacked monetary resources due to chaos and famines, hence he advocated replacing silk fujin with the older bian (弁; a type of cap) made of leather. He also suggested the use of colours (instead of material) to distinguish status in the military. His ideas were implemented. He also invented a type of hat, the qia (帢), for casual wear. (Note: Fu Xuan, Fu Zi: "漢末王公，多委王服，以幅巾為雅，是以袁紹、崔豹之徒，雖為將帥，皆著縑巾。魏太祖以天下凶荒，資財乏匱，擬古皮弁，裁縑帛以為帢，合于簡易隨時之義，以色別其貴賤，于今施行，可謂軍容，非國容也。" Cited in Chen and Pei 429, 1.54 n. 2.) He felt that it was a pity to have very extravagant arrangements in weddings, so, when his daughter got married, she was dressed modestly and had no more than 10 ladies-in-waiting to accompany her. (Note: Fu Xuan, Fu Zi: "太祖愍嫁娶之奢僭，公女適人，皆以皁帳，從婢不過十人。" Cited in Chen and Pei 429, 1.54 n. 2.) After winning battles, he awarded the spoils of war to his men who had made contributions. He heavily rewarded those who deserved to be rewarded; undeserving people who expected to receive something from him had their hopes dashed. When others presented gifts to him, he shared those gifts with his subordinates. He felt that it was of no benefit to own many possessions because such things would eventually wear out. He personally prepared the clothes he would wear at his funeral and the items he would be buried with, which were sufficient to fill up just four trunks. (Note: Book of Wei: "太祖自統御海內，芟夷羣醜，其行軍用師，大較依孫、吳之法，而因事設奇，譎敵制勝，變化如神。自作兵書十萬餘言，諸將征伐，皆以新書從事。臨事又手為節度，從令者克捷，違教者負敗。與虜對陣，意思安閑，如不欲戰，然及至決機乘勝，氣勢盈溢，故每戰必克，軍無幸勝。知人善察，難眩以偽，拔于禁、樂進於行陣之間，取張遼、徐晃於亡虜之內，皆佐命立功，列為名將；其餘拔出細微，登為牧守者，不可勝數。是以刱造大業，文武並施，御軍三十餘年，手不捨書，晝則講武策，夜則思經傳，登高必賦，及造新詩，被之管絃，皆成樂章。才力絕人，手射飛鳥，躬禽猛獸，嘗于南皮一日射雉獲六十三頭。及造作宮室，繕治器械，無不為之法則，皆盡其意。雅性節儉，不好華麗，後宮衣不錦繡，侍御履不二采，帷帳屏風，壞則補納，茵蓐取溫，無有緣飾。攻城拔邑，得靡麗之物，則悉以賜有功，勳勞宜賞，不吝千金，無功望施，分豪不與，四方獻御，與羣下共之。常以送終之制，襲稱之數，繁而無益，俗又過之，故預自制終亡衣服，四篋而已。" Cited in Chen and Pei 429, 1.54 n. 2.)

=== Interests and hobbies ===
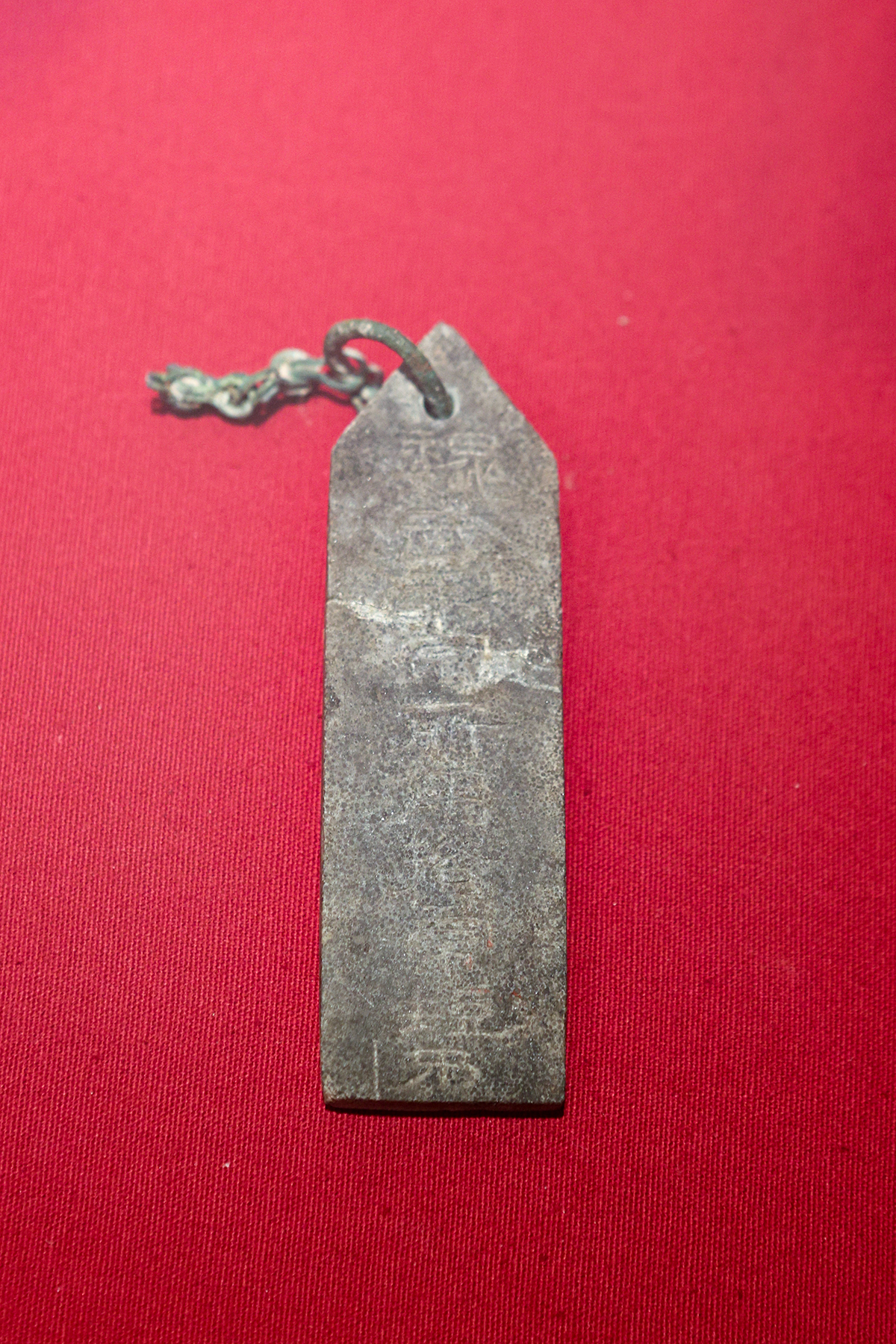
Stone tablet with inscription reading "short spear for killing tigers often used by King Wu of Wei" (魏武王常所用挌虎短矛), Cao Cao Mausoleum Museum

Cao Cao was known to be very skilled in hand-to-hand combat. When he was still a youth, he once broke into the eunuch Zhang Rang's personal chambers but was discovered. Armed with only a short ji halberd, he brandished the weapon at the guards as he slowly retreated and eventually climbed over the wall and escaped. (Note: Sun Sheng, Yitong Zayu: "太祖嘗私入中常侍張讓室，讓覺之；乃舞手戟於庭，踰垣而出。才武絕人，莫之能害。" Cited in Chen and Pei 429, 1.3 n. 2.) He also enjoyed hunting and once shot down 63 pheasants in a single day during a hunting expedition in Nanpi County. (Note: Book of Wei: "才力絕人，手射飛鳥，躬禽猛獸，嘗于南皮一日射雉獲六十三頭。" Cited in Chen and Pei 429, 1.54 n. 2.)

Cao Cao was very fond of reading books, especially military classics and treatises. Apart from writing military journals and annotating Sun Tzu's The Art of War, he also collected various military books and compiled extracts from them. His works were spread around. He also gave out new reading materials to his officers when they went to battle. He never neglected reading throughout his military career of over 30 years. (Note: Sun Sheng, Yitong Zayu: "博覽群書，特好兵法，抄集諸家兵法，名曰接要，又注孫武十三篇，皆傳於世。" Cited in Chen and Pei 429, 1.3 n. 2.) (Note: Book of Wei: "自作兵書十萬餘言，諸將征伐，皆以新書從事。 ...御軍三十餘年，手不捨書，晝則講武策，夜則思經傳". Cited in Chen and Pei 429, 1.54 n. 2.) When Sun Quan encouraged his general Lü Meng to take up scholarly pursuits, he cited Cao Cao as an example: "Mengde agrees that he is already old but he never gives up on learning." (Note: Yu Pu, Jiang Biao zhuan: "孟德亦自謂老而好學。" Cited in Chen and Pei 429, 54.1275 n. 1 (first n. 1).)

Some of Cao Cao's other interests and hobbies were recorded in Zhang Hua's Bowuzhi, which mentioned that he enjoyed calligraphy, music and weiqi. His proficiency in these arts were comparable to other experts who lived around the same time as him, such as: calligraphers Cui Yuan, Cui Shi, Zhang Zhi and Zhang Xu (張昶); musicians Huan Tan and Cai Yong; and weiqi players Shan Zidao (山子道), Wang Jiuzhen (王九真) and Guo Kai (郭凱). Cao Cao was also interested in alchemy and the art of longevity. He met and sought help from various fangshi, including Zuo Ci, Hua Tuo, Gan Shi (甘始) and Xi Jian (郄儉). The Bowuzhi stated that he attempted tasting wild kudzu up to one chi in length and sipping wine dipped with feathers of the poisonous zhen bird. (Note: Zhang 290s: "漢世，安平崔瑗、瑗子寔、弘農張芝、芝弟昶並善草書，而太祖亞之。桓譚、蔡邕善音樂，馮翊山子道、王九真、郭凱等善圍棊，太祖皆與埒能。又好養性法，亦解方藥，招引方術之士，廬江左慈、譙郡華佗、甘陵甘始、陽城郄儉無不畢至，又習啖野葛至一尺，亦得少多飲鴆酒。". Cited in Chen and Pei 429, 1.54 n. 2.)

=== Poetry ===
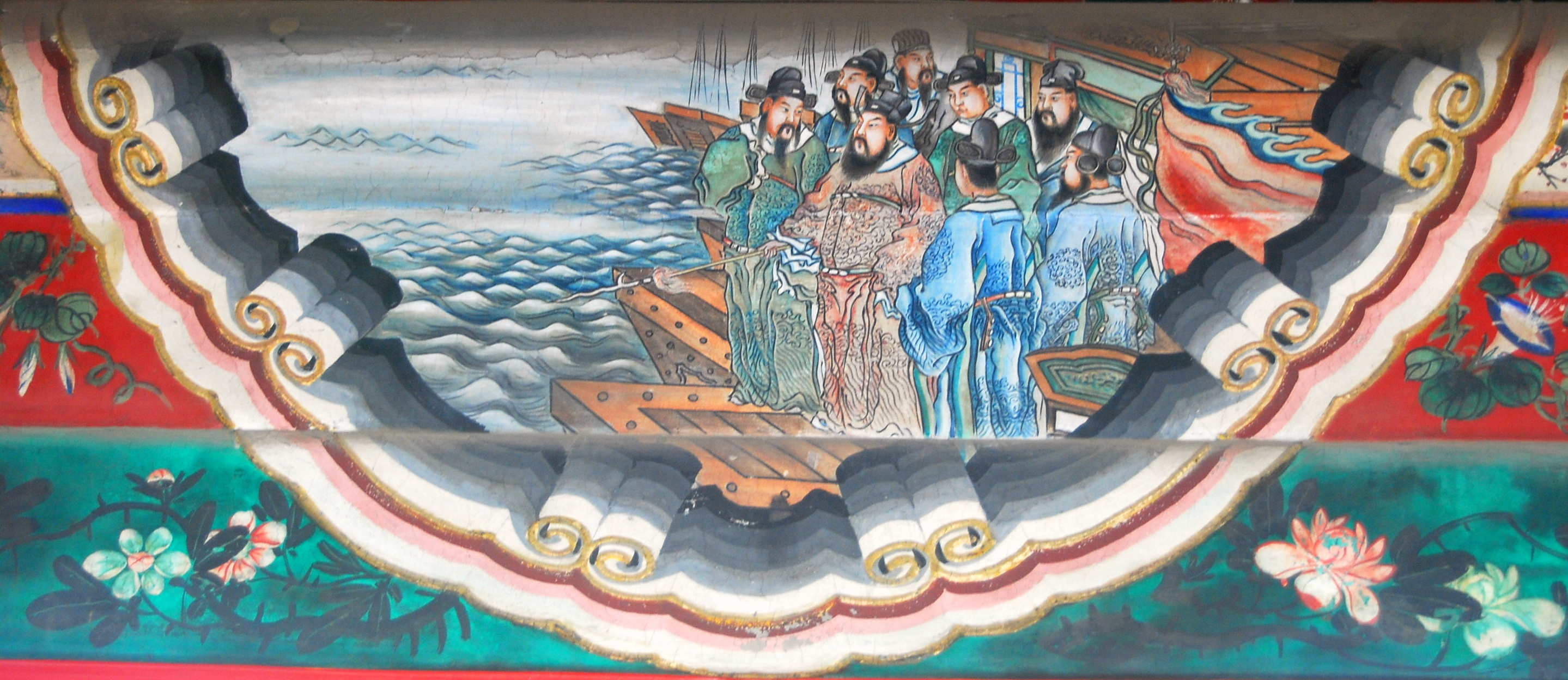
Cao Cao cites a poem before the Battle of Red Cliffs, portrait at the Long Corridor of the Summer Palace, Beijing

Cao Cao was an accomplished poet, as were his sons Cao Pi and Cao Zhi. The Wei Shu recorded that whenever he ascended high ground, he would compose odes and poems and turn them into musical pieces with the aid of music accompaniment. (Note: Book of Wei: "登高必賦，及造新詩，被之管絃，皆成樂章。" Cited in Chen and Pei 429, 1.54 n. 2.) He was also a patron of poets such as Xu Gan. Of Cao Cao's works, only a remnant remain today. His verses, unpretentious yet profound, helped to reshape the poetic style of his time and beyond, eventually contributing to the poetry styles associated with Tang dynasty poetry. Cao Cao, Cao Pi and Cao Zhi are known collectively as the "Three Caos". The Three Caos' poetry, together with additional poets, became known as the Jian'an style, which contributed to Tang and later poetry. Cao Cao also wrote verse in the older four-character per line style characteristic of the Classic of Poetry. Burton Watson describes Cao Cao as: "the only writer of the period who succeeded in infusing the old four-character metre with any vitality, mainly because he discarded the archaic diction associated with it and employed the ordinary poetic language of his time." Cao Cao is also known for his early contributions to the Shanshui poetry genre, with his 4-character-per-line, 14-line poem "View of the Blue Sea" (觀滄海).

== Evaluation ==
Opinions of Cao Cao have been divided from as early as the Jin dynasty (266–420) – the period immediately after the Three Kingdoms era (220–280) – to modern times. There were some who praised him for his achievements in poetry and his political and military careers, but there were also others who hold unfavourable views of him for his cruelty, cunning and alleged traitorous ways. In traditional Chinese culture and literature, Cao Cao is stereotypically portrayed as a sly, power hungry and treacherous tyrant, serving as a nemesis to Liu Bei.

Chen Shou, who wrote Cao Cao's official biography in the Sanguozhi, praised Cao Cao for his exemplary wisdom and sagacity and his promotion of meritocracy in the civil service and the military. Chen Shou's concluding remarks on Cao Cao were "an extraordinary man and an outstanding hero of his time." (Note: Chen Shou, in Chen and Pei 429, 1.55: "評曰：漢末，天下大亂，雄豪並起，而袁紹虎眎四州，彊盛莫敵。太祖運籌演謀，鞭撻宇內，擥申、商之法術，該韓、白之奇策，官方授材，各因其器，矯情任筭，不念舊惡，終能總御皇機，克成洪業者，惟其明略最優也。抑可謂非常之人，超世之傑矣。")

During the Tang dynasty (618–907), Emperor Taizong wrote elegiac addresses for Cao Cao, complimenting Cao Cao for his ability to maintain control of the political situation in a turbulent period, and commenting that Cao Cao was "exceptionally brilliant for a military leader but not competent enough to rule as an emperor." (Note: Zizhi Tongjian 1084, volume 197: "癸亥，上至鄴，自為文祭魏太祖，曰：「臨危制變，料敵設奇，一將之智有餘，萬乘之才不足。」") However, Liu Zhiji condemned Cao Cao for his oppressive treatment of Emperor Xian and his role in the murder of Empress Fu Shou and claimed that Cao Cao's "crimes" were worse than those of Tian Chengzi (Note: The Usurpation of Qi by Tian) and Wang Mang.

In the Northern Song dynasty (960–1127), Sima Guang, who wrote the Zizhi Tongjian, echoed Chen Shou's positive views of Cao Cao's championing of a meritocratic style of governance and praised Cao Cao's acumen for recognising and grooming talents, but also noted that Cao Cao was strict and harsh in upholding laws. (Note: Zizhi Tongjian 1084, volume 69: "王知人善察，難眩以偽。識拔奇才，不拘微賤，隨能任使，皆獲其用。與敵對陳，意思安閑，如不欲戰然；及至決機乘勝，氣勢盈溢。勳勞宜賞，不吝千金；無功望施，分豪不與。用法峻急，有犯必戮，或對之流涕，然終無所赦。雅性節儉，不好華麗。故能芟刈羣雄，幾平海內。") During that period, shuoshu (traditional Chinese storytelling) was very popular among the masses, so folktales and legends about the Three Kingdoms era were widely circulated and narrated. The poet Su Shi mentioned that "audiences looked distressed when they heard that Liu Bei had lost battles and some even shed tears; they expressed joy and delight when they heard that Cao Cao had been defeated."

During the Southern Song dynasty (1127–1279), Zhu Xi produced the Tongjian Gangmu (a condensed version of Sima Guang's Zizhi Tongjian), in which he regarded Shu Han as the legitimate successor to the Han dynasty and denounced Cao Cao as cuan ni (篡逆). (Note: The term cuan ni (篡逆) is composed of two Chinese characters which mean "usurp" and "defy" respectively. In ancient China, it was used as a derogatory term in political contexts to accuse persons of harbouring the intention of usurping the emperor's throne, which was regarded as treasonous in nature. See the dictionary definition of 篡逆.)

In the Ming dynasty (1368–1644), Luo Guanzhong wrote the historical novel Romance of the Three Kingdoms, which romanticises the historical events before and during the Three Kingdoms period. Cao Cao was cast as a primary antagonist in the novel.

The 20th-century writer Lu Xun once said: "Actually, Cao Cao was a very capable person and was at least a hero. I may not agree with Cao Cao, but I am nonetheless always very impressed with him."

Mao Zedong was known to be a great admirer of Cao Cao and he actively advocated providing historical "redress" for the warlord. His praise on Cao Cao centred on three aspects: Cao Cao's literary talents (poetry and writings); Cao Cao's contributions to the unification of China (after the Three Kingdoms period); Cao Cao's determination in the face of adversity.

Modern historians such as Lü Simian, and Yi Zhongtian have written books to present more balanced views of Cao Cao. Between 2006 and 2007, Yi Zhongtian conducted a series of 52 lectures about the Three Kingdoms, of which nearly a third focused on Cao Cao, on the CCTV programme Lecture Room. (Note: Yi Zhongtian's lecture series was called Pin San Guo (品三国; Analysis of the Three Kingdoms). He wrote a two-part book, also titled Pin San Guo, about his lecture series, including some information which was not covered in the lectures.)

Outside China, Cao Cao was appraised by Indonesian president Prabowo Subianto who wrote an excerpt of Cao Cao's leadership style in his book On the Art of Military Leadership. In his entry, Prabowo praised Cao Cao as a brilliant leader who fought with his soldiers together at the frontlines and loyal to Emperor Xian and states that what can be learned from Cao Cao is his loyalty. He also praised Cao Cao as sincere to his troops as his troops were not surprisingly willing to die for Cao Cao, stating that a leader who is loyal to his subjects will earn the loyalty of his subjects in return.

== In anecdotes and legends ==
=== From works preserved in Pei Songzhi's annotations ===
Cao Cao's uncle complained to Cao Song several times about his nephew's behaviour, so Cao Cao became more wary of his uncle. One day, Cao Cao encountered his uncle on the street and pretended to twist his mouth and collapse on the ground. When his uncle asked him what happened, he claimed he had been paralysed after suffering from a stroke. Cao Cao's uncle went to inform Cao Song, who immediately rushed to the scene, where he saw that his son was well. Cao Song asked his son: "Your uncle says you had a stroke. Is it true?" Cao Cao replied: "I didn't have a stroke, but I have lost the love of my uncle, which is probably why he would say something so nasty about me." Cao Song believed his son and refused to trust his brother again when his brother complained about Cao Cao. Cao Cao was able to do as he wished. (Note: Cao Man zhuan: "太祖少好飛鷹走狗，游蕩無度，其叔父數言之於嵩。太祖患之，後逢叔父於路，乃陽敗面喎口；叔父怪而問其故，太祖曰：「卒中惡風。」叔父以告嵩。嵩驚愕，呼太祖，太祖口貌如故。嵩問曰：「叔父言汝中風，已差乎？」太祖曰：「初不中風，但失愛於叔父，故見罔耳。」嵩乃疑焉。自後叔父有所告，嵩終不復信，太祖於是益得肆意矣。" Cited in Chen and Pei 429, 1.2 n. 1.)

Yuan Zhong (袁忠), the chief administrative officer in Cao Cao's hometown, attempted to prosecute Cao Cao when he was still an ill-behaved and idling young rascal. Huan Shao (桓邵), who was also from Cao Cao's hometown, treated Cao Cao with contempt when he was still a youth. After Cao Cao became the Inspector of Yan Province in the early 190s, Bian Rang (邊讓), who was from Chenliu Commandery (陳留郡; around present-day Kaifeng), insulted and belittled him. Cao Cao had Bian Rang and his family arrested and executed. Yuan Zhong and Huan Shao fled to Jiao Province to evade Cao Cao, but Cao ordered Jiao Province's Administrator, Shi Xie, to track down and kill them along with their families. Huan Shao gave up on escaping, surrendered to Cao Cao and begged for his life. Cao Cao asked him coldly: "You think you can be spared from death just by kneeling in front of me?" He then ordered Huan Shao's execution. (Note: Cao Man zhuan: "初，袁忠為沛相，嘗欲以法治太祖，沛國桓邵亦輕之，及在兖州，陳留邊讓言議頗侵太祖，太祖殺讓，族其家。忠、邵俱避難交州，太祖遣使就太守士燮盡族之。桓邵得出首，拜謝於庭中，太祖謂曰：「跪可解死邪！」遂殺之。" Cited in Chen and Pei 429, 1.55 n. 2.)

After assuming his first appointment as the Commandant of the North District (北部尉) of the imperial capital Luoyang, he ordered his subordinates to make five-coloured wooden staffs and place them outside the office. He also instructed them to use those staffs to kill any person who violated the night curfew regardless of his/her status. (Note: Cao Man zhuan: "太祖初入尉廨，繕治四門。造五色棒，縣門左右各十餘枚，有犯禁者，不避豪彊，皆棒殺之。" Cited in Chen and Pei 429, 1.3 n. 3.) Some months later, an uncle of the influential eunuch Jian Shuo violated the curfew by walking on the streets at night. Cao Cao arrested Jian Shuo's uncle and ordered his men to beat him to death. This incident shocked everyone in Luoyang and nobody dared to violate the night curfew after that. The eunuchs resented Cao Cao for his actions but could not do anything to him because he had the law on his side. They then recommended him to serve as the Prefect of Dunqiu County (頓丘縣), sending him out of Luoyang. (Note: Cao Man zhuan: "後數月，靈帝愛幸小黃門蹇碩叔父夜行，即殺之。京師斂迹，莫敢犯者。近習寵臣咸疾之，然不能傷，於是共稱薦之，故遷為頓丘令。" Cited in Chen and Pei 429, 1.3 n. 3.)

During one military expedition, when his army passed through wheat fields, Cao Cao issued an order: "Any person who damages the crops will be executed." His soldiers immediately dismounted from their horses and trod carefully through the fields. Cao Cao's steed rushed into the field and trampled on the wheat. He then summoned his registrar (主簿) and asked him what punishment he should receive. The registrar said that according to Confucian philosophy, Cao Cao, a man of exalted status, was exempt from punishment. Cao Cao said: "How can I expect to lead my men if I gave an order and violated it myself? However, I am the commander so I can't kill myself. However, I still have to punish myself." He drew his sword, cut off a lock of his hair and threw it to the ground. (Note: According to Confucian teachings, a person's body is a gift from their parents so harming it in any way is an unfilial act, which was why the ancient Chinese did not cut their hair. Cao Cao was actually performing a symbolic execution on himself when he cut off his hair because the lock of hair he cut off represented his head.) (Note: Cao Man zhuan: "嘗出軍，行經麥中，令「士卒無敗麥，犯者死」。騎士皆下馬，付麥以相付，於是太祖馬騰入麥中，勑主簿議罪；主簿對以春秋之義，罰不加於尊。太祖曰：「制法而自犯之，何以帥下？然孤為軍帥，不可自殺，請自刑。」因援劔割髮以置地。" Cited in Chen and Pei 429, 1.55 n. 2.) In some later traditions, Cao Cao also executes his horse.

Cao Cao was often accompanied by one of his favourite concubines when he slept. Once, before taking a short nap, he instructed her to wake him up a while later. The concubine saw that he was sound asleep so she did not wake him up. When Cao Cao woke up later, he ordered her to be beaten to death. (Note: Cao Man zhuan: "又有幸姬常從晝寢，枕之卧，告之曰：「須臾覺我。」姬見太祖卧安，未即寤，及自覺，棒殺之。" Cited in Chen and Pei 429, 1.55 n. 2.)

During another military campaign, when Cao Cao's food supplies were running out, he asked his supply officer what they should do. The officer suggested that they reduce the amount of grain rationed out. Cao Cao agreed. Later, when rumours about Cao Cao deceiving his soldiers started spreading around, Cao Cao told the supply officer: "I want to 'borrow' your life to appease the men, or else the problem can't be resolved." He then executed the officer, put his head on display and announced: "(This man) stole from the granary and reduced the amount of grain rationed out. I had him executed under military law." (Note: Cao Man zhuan: "常討賊，廩穀不足，私謂主者曰：「如何？」主者曰：「可以小斛以足之。」太祖曰：「善。」後軍中言太祖欺衆，太祖謂主者曰：「特當借君死以猒衆，不然事不解。」乃斬之，取首題徇曰：「行小斛，盜官穀，斬之軍門。」" Cited in Chen and Pei 429, 1.55 n. 2.)

After Xiahou Yuan's death in battle, Cao Cao was growing tired of the Hanzhong campaign and wanted to abandon Hanzhong Commandery. He gave an order, "chicken rib" (雞肋), which baffled his subordinates, who did not know what he meant. Yang Xiu, a Registrar (主簿) under Cao Cao, immediately gave instructions for everyone to pack up and prepare to leave. When they asked Yang Xiu how he knew that Cao Cao wanted to withdraw, Yang Xiu replied: "It's a pity to discard a piece of chicken rib, but there's nothing from it which can be eaten. The King is comparing Hanzhong to a piece of chicken rib. That's how I know he intends to retreat." (Note: Sima Biao, Jiu Zhou Chunqiu: "時王欲還，出令曰「雞肋」，官屬不知所謂。主簿楊脩便自嚴裝，人驚問脩：「何以知之？」脩曰：「夫雞肋，棄之如可惜，食之無所得，以比漢中，知王欲還也。」". Cited in Chen and Pei 429, 1.52 n. 1 (first n. 1).) Cao Cao withdrew his forces back to Chang'an afterwards. In Luoyang a few months later, he revisited the office where he first served as a Commandant of the North District (北部尉) in his early career. (Note: Cao Man zhuan: "王更脩治北部尉廨，令過于舊。" Cited in Chen and Pei 429, 1.52 n. 1 (third n. 1).)

The Shiyu and the Cao Man Zhuan provided dramatic accounts of the events before Cao Cao's death. The Shiyu mentioned that after he returned to Luoyang from Hanzhong Commandery, Cao Cao wanted to build a palace hall so he ordered a Zhuolong Shrine (濯龍祠) to be demolished to make way, but blood spilled out from a tree. (Note: Guo Song, Shiyu: "太祖自漢中至洛陽，起建始殿，伐濯龍祠而樹血出。" Cited in Chen and Pei 429, 1.53 n. 1.) The Cao Man Zhuan mentioned that Cao Cao wanted a pear tree to be moved. When the workers uprooted the tree, blood spilled out from its roots, and the workers were all shocked. Cao Cao heard about it and went there to take a closer look. He was disgusted and felt that it was an unlucky omen. He became ill after returning home. (Note: Cao Man zhuan: "王使工蘇越徙美梨，掘之，根傷盡出血。越白狀，王躬自視而惡之，以為不祥，還遂寢疾。" Cited in Chen and Pei 429, 1.53 n. 1.)

=== From the Shishuo Xinyu ===
Cao Cao and Yuan Shao were close friends and playmates when they were young. Once, they decided to play a prank on a newlywed couple by kidnapping the bride. After breaking into the house, they shouted: "There's a thief!" When everyone in the house came out to catch the "thief", they sneaked into the house and kidnapped the bride. While fleeing from their pursuers, Yuan Shao fell into a hedge covered with thorns and was trapped there. Cao Cao shouted: "The thief is here!" Yuan Shao became panicky so he struggled and managed to free himself and escape. (Note: Shishuo Xinyu 430, ch. 27 §1: "魏武少時，嘗與袁紹好為游俠，觀人新婚，因潛入主人園中，夜叫呼云：「有偷兒賊！」青廬中人皆出觀，魏武乃入，抽刃劫新婦與紹還出，失道，墜枳棘中，紹不能得動，復大叫云：「偷兒在此！」紹遑迫自擲出，遂以俱免。" Mather 2002, p. 476.) Suggestive parallels have been drawn between this anecdote and the actual political situation of the 190s, when Cao Cao had control over the emperor but was free to chastise Yuan Shao for disloyalty.

When Yuan Shao and Cao Cao were young, Yuan Shao once played a prank on Cao Cao by sending someone to throw a dagger at Cao Cao while he was asleep at night. The dagger landed low and missed Cao Cao. Cao Cao saw that and knew that the thrower would aim higher on the next attempt, so he changed his sleeping posture. He was right because the dagger landed higher on the second throw. (Note: Shishuo Xinyu 430, ch. 27 §5: "袁紹年少時，曾遣人夜以劍擲魏武，少下，不著。魏武揆之，其後來必高，因帖臥牀上。劍至果高。" Mather 2002, p. 478.)

During one military expedition, Cao Cao and his army lost track of their water source and were very thirsty. Cao Cao announced: "There's a plum forest filled with juicy plums ahead. We can quench our thirst there." The soldiers started salivating when they heard that, which temporarily quenched their thirst until they finally found a water source. (Note: Shishuo Xinyu 430, ch. 27 §2: "魏武行役，失汲道，軍皆渴，乃令曰：「前有大梅林，饒子，甘酸，可以解渴。」士卒聞之，口皆出水，乘此得及前源。" Mather 2002, p. 477.) This story is the origin of the Chinese idiom "thinking of plums to quench one's thirst" (望梅止渴; wàng méi zhǐ kě), which means to use one's imagination to satisfy one's craving for something.

Cao Cao often said: "I can sense it when someone is about to harm me." He once secretly instructed a servant: "Approach me from the side with a concealed dagger and then I will say I can sense it. After you are caught, you mustn't say that I told you to do so, and nothing will happen to you. I will reward you handsomely later!" The servant trusted Cao Cao and did as he was told without fear, but Cao still had him executed after he was "captured". Cao Cao's enemies, who were plotting to assassinate him, believed that his so-called 'sensing power' was real and were demoralised by this incident. (Note: Shishuo Xinyu 430, ch. 27 §3: "魏武常言：「人慾危己，己輒心動。」因語所親小人曰：「汝懷刃密來我側，我必說心動。執汝使行刑，汝但勿言其使，無他，當厚相報！」執者信焉，不以為懼，遂斬之。此人至死不知也。左右以為實，謀逆者挫氣矣。" Mather 2002, p. 477.)

Cao Cao often said: "Don't approach me when I am asleep. I will subconsciously attack anyone who is near me. Beware, all of you!" Once, while he was taking an afternoon nap, someone covered him with a blanket. He woke up and killed the person. After this incident, when he was asleep, no one dared to approach him. (Note: Shishuo Xinyu 430, ch. 27 §4: "魏武常云：「我眠中不可妄近，近便斫人，亦不自覺，左右宜深慎此！」後陽眠，所幸一人竊以被覆之，因便斫殺。自爾每眠，左右莫敢近者。" Mather 2002, p. 477.)

Once, when Cao Cao was about to meet an emissary from the Xiongnu, he felt that he looked ugly and might not be able to command respect so he ordered Cui Yan to impersonate him while he carried a sword, stood beside Cui Yan, and pretended to be a bodyguard. After the meeting, Cao Cao sent someone to ask the Xiongnu emissary about his impression of the King of Wei. The Xiongnu emissary replied: "The King looks handsome and extraordinary. However, the man who was carrying a sword and standing beside him is a real hero." Cao Cao had the emissary killed when he heard that. (Note: Shishuo Xinyu 430, ch. 14 §1: "魏武將見匈奴使，自以形陋，不足雄遠國，使崔季珪代，帝自捉刀立牀頭。既畢，令間諜問曰：「魏王何如？」匈奴使答曰：「魏王雅望非常，然牀頭捉刀人，此乃英雄也。」魏武聞之，追殺此使。" Mather 2002, p. 330.)

Cao Cao had a concubine who sang very well but was cruel and malicious. There were many occasions where he wanted to kill her or send her away, but did not do so because he appreciated her singing talent. He then selected another 100 women and ordered his concubine to teach them to sing. After some time, one of the 100 women could sing as well as Cao Cao's concubine, so Cao Cao executed his concubine and replaced her with that woman. (Note: Shishuo Xinyu 430, ch. 31 §1: "魏武有一妓，聲最清高，而情性酷惡。欲殺則愛才，欲置則不堪。於是選百人一時俱教。少時，果有一人聲及之，便殺惡性者。" Mather 2002, p. 500.)

== In Romance of the Three Kingdoms ==
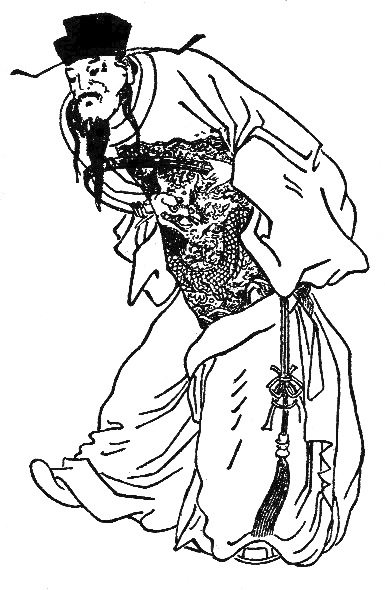
A portrait of Cao Cao from a Qing dynasty edition of the Romance of the Three Kingdoms, the hunched figure clearly portraying him as a villain. The anachronistic headwear is from the Song dynasty almost a millennium after Cao's death.

The 14th-century historical novel Romance of the Three Kingdoms by Luo Guanzhong is a romanticisation of the events of the late Eastern Han dynasty and the Three Kingdoms period. While adhering to historical facts most of the time, the novel inevitably reshaped Cao Cao to some extent, portraying him as a cruel and suspicious villain. In some chapters, Luo Guanzhong created or transmitted fictional or semi-fictional events involving Cao Cao. As the novel has been adapted to many modern forms of media, so has Cao Cao's image.

== In popular culture ==
Through to modern times, the Chinese equivalent of the English idiom "speak of the devil" is "speak of Cao Cao and Cao Cao arrives" (说到曹操，曹操就到).

After the Communists won the Chinese Civil War in 1949, there were perceived similarities between Mao Zedong and Cao Cao, so propagandists began a long-term and sustained effort to improve Cao Cao's image in popular culture. In 1959, Peng Dehuai wrote a letter to Mao, in which he compared himself to Zhang Fei. Because of Mao's popular association with Cao Cao, Peng's comparison implied that he had an intuitively confrontational relationship with Mao. Mao had the letter widely circulated in order to make Peng's attitude clear to other party members and proceeded to purge Peng and end his career.

=== Chinese opera ===
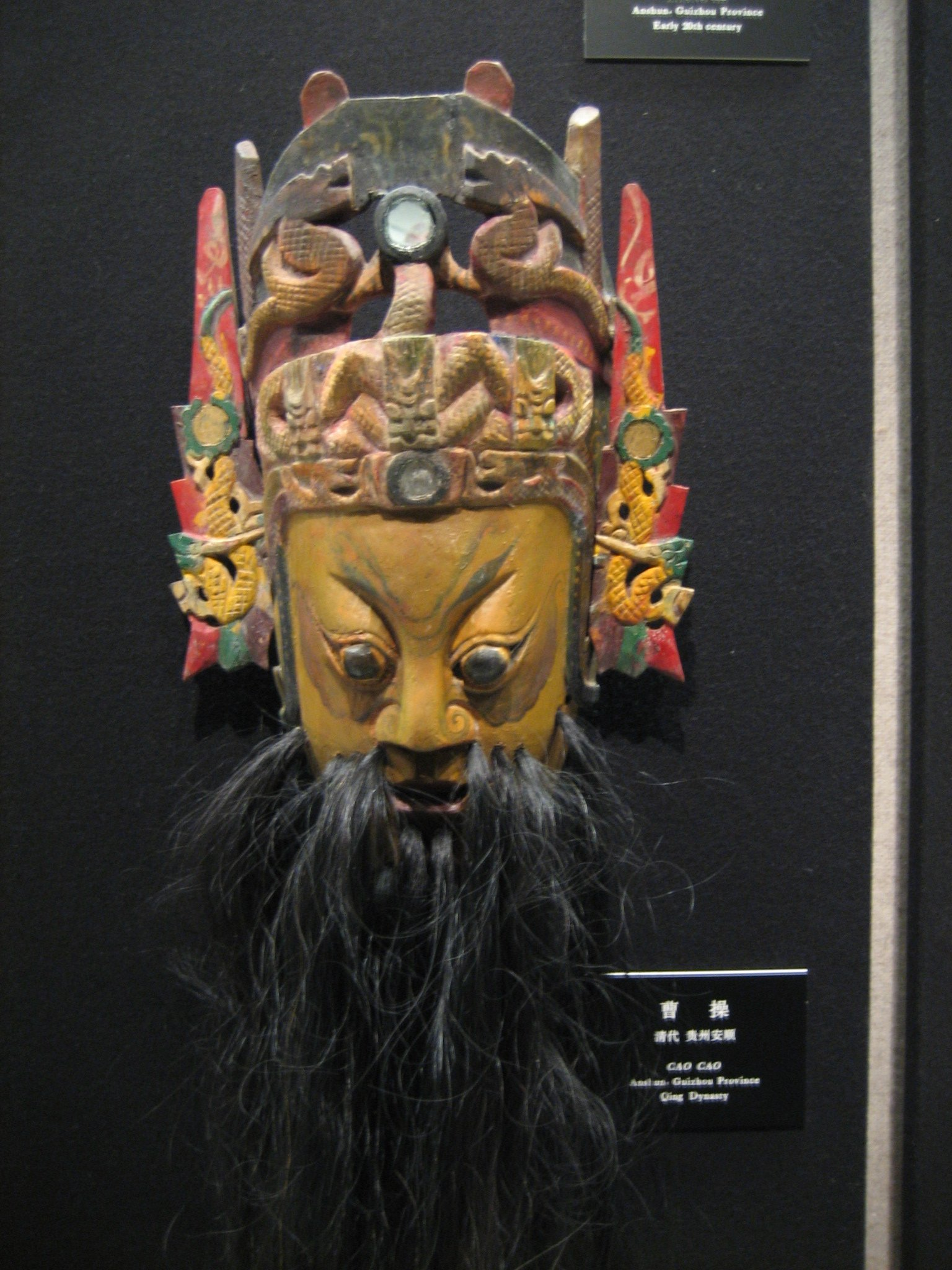
A mask of Cao Cao in Chinese opera.

Cao Cao is represented as a cunning and deceitful man in Chinese opera, where his character is given a white facial makeup to reflect his treacherous personality. When Luo Guanzhong wrote Romance of the Three Kingdoms, he took much of his inspiration for Cao Cao from Chinese opera.

=== Film and television ===
The "Father of Hong Kong cinema", Lai Man-Wai, portrayed Cao Cao in The Witty Sorcerer, a 1931 comedy film based on a story in Romance of the Three Kingdoms about Zuo Ci playing tricks on Cao Cao. In the Shaw Brothers film The Weird Man, Cao Cao appeared in the beginning of the film with Zuo Ci.

Other notable actors who have portrayed Cao Cao in film and television include:

- Bao Guo'an in the 1994 Chinese television series Romance of the Three Kingdoms. Bao won two Best Actor awards at the 1995 Golden Eagle Awards and Flying Apsaras Awards for his performance.
- Damian Lau in the 2008 Hong Kong film Three Kingdoms: Resurrection of the Dragon.
- Zhang Fengyi in the 2008–09 Chinese film Red Cliff.
- Chen Jianbin in the 2010 Chinese television series Three Kingdoms and the 2018 Chinese television series Cao Cao.
- Jiang Wen in the 2011 Hong Kong film The Lost Bladesman.
- Chow Yun-fat in the 2012 Chinese film The Assassins.
- Zhao Lixin in the 2014 Chinese television series Cao Cao.
- Yu Hewei in the 2017 Chinese television series The Advisors Alliance.
- Tse Kwan-ho in the 2018 Chinese television series Secret of the Three Kingdoms.
- Wang Kai in the 2019 Hong Kong film Dynasty Warriors

=== Video games ===
Cao Cao appears in many historical simulations based on the Three Kingdoms period including all instalments of Koei's Romance of the Three Kingdoms video game series and Total War: Three Kingdoms. He is also featured in Koei's Dynasty Warriors and Warriors Orochi series, in Koei's Kessen II, and in TiMi Studios' Honor of Kings as playable main characters.

== Notes ==
Emperor Wu of Cao Wei House of Cao Born: 155 Died: 15 March 220
Regnal titles
Preceded by Himself as Duke of Wei	King of Wei; 216–220	Succeeded by Cao Pi
Political offices
Vacant Title last held by Dong Zhuo as Chancellor of State	Imperial Chancellor; Eastern Han; 208–220	Succeeded by Cao Pi
Chinese nobility
New title	Duke of Wei; 213–216	Succeeded by Himself as King of Wei
