= Xiahou =

Xiahou (Chinese: 夏侯; pinyin: Xiàhóu) is a Chinese compound surname from the Spring and Autumn period. After the State of Qi was destroyed by Chu, Duke Jian of Qi's (杞简公) younger brother, Prince Tuo (公子佗), fled to the State of Lu. Duke Dao of Lu (鲁悼公) granted him land and created him Marquis of Xia (Chinese: 夏侯; pinyin: xiàhóu), after their ancestor's, Yu the Great's, dynastic name, Xia (夏).

Xiahou is a rare compound surname. Beijing, Shanghai, Ji'an (Jiangxi), Wuhan (Hubei), Pingxiang, Xingguo, Taiyuan (Shanxi), Jinzhong, and Taichung (Taiwan) are some of the places where this surname can be found today.

== Notable people surnamed Xiahou ==
- Xiahou Ying, Renowned early Han official, rose to the rank of Minister Coachman
- Lady Xiahou (Xiahouji), Noble lady of Three Kingdoms period, and wife of Zhang Fei of Shu Han state.
- Xiahou Lingnu, Noble lady of the Three Kingdoms period, loyal to the Cao Wei state.
- Xiahou Xuan, Late Eastern Han dynasty metaphysician, minister of Cao Wei
- Xiahou Dun, General of Cao Wei
- Xiahou Yuan, General of Cao Wei
- Xiahou Ba, General of Cao Wei (later defected to Shu Han), second son of Xiahou Yuan
- Chengguan, Native of Shanyin in Yue County during the Tang dynasty (present day Shaoxing, Zhejiang), allegedly surnamed Xiahou, zi Da Xiu, granted the hao Qingliang, one of the four ancestors of the Huayan School.
- Xiahou He, Official of Cao Wei
- Xiahou Hui, Official of Cao Wei
- Xiahou Hui, Wife of Sima Shi, daughter of Xiahou Shang
- Xiahou Mao, Official of Cao Wei
- Xiahou Shang, General of Cao Wei
- Xiahou Wei, Official Cao Wei
