= Battle of Han River =

Battle between warlords Liu Bei and Cao Cao (219)

- Part of the Hanzhong Campaign
Date	April 219
Location	Hanzhong, Shaanxi, China
Result	Liu Bei victory

Belligerents
Liu Bei	Cao Cao

Commanders and leaders
Zhao Yun	Cao Cao

Strength
Unknown	Unknown

Casualties and losses
Unknown	Unknown

Battle of Han River
- Traditional Chinese: 漢水之戰
- Simplified Chinese: 汉水之战
Transcriptions
Standard Mandarin
- Hanyu Pinyin: Hànshǔi Zhī Zhàn

The Battle of Han River was fought between the warlords Liu Bei and Cao Cao in April 219 during the prelude to the Three Kingdoms period of Chinese history. The battle was the last major engagement in the Hanzhong Campaign, in which Liu Bei emerged victorious and subsequently declared himself King of Hanzhong.

== Background ==
Cao Cao's general Xiahou Yuan was defeated and killed by Liu Bei at the Battle of Mount Dingjun in February 219. In retaliation, Cao Cao led a large army along with millions of grains to supply his troops. Cao Cao wanted to attack Liu Bei's camp at the south of the Han River. Therefore, Liu Bei sent his generals Zhao Yun and Huang Zhong to defend it. Later, as Huang Zhong along with his soldiers went to capture the enemy's supplies. Zhao Yun and his subordinate Zhang Zhu (張著) remained in the main camp with Zhang Yi to keep it safe until their return.

== Battle ==
Huang Zhong led some troops to capture the supplies of grain Cao Cao stocked at the North Mountain. Zhao Yun along with his unit assisted Huang Zhong during this mission. As Huang Zhong had been gone for long, Zhao Yun became worried that something happened to him and along with some tens light cavalry left his camp to find Huang Zhong's unit. During their search, they encountered Cao Cao's main army and were forced to fight against them, as more and more of Cao Cao's soldiers joined the battle. Yet, Zhao Yun with a handful of soldiers charged among their masses. At the same time, attacking and retreating, Zhao Yun managed to defeat a far larger army.

Cao Cao's soldiers soon regrouped but Zhao Yun again, along with his fellow riders broke the encirclement and lead them back to the main camp. During this battle, the officer Zhang Zhu (張著) was wounded hence he could not retreat. Zhao Yun turned back, rescued the wounded Zhang Zhu and led him back to the camp. However, Cao Cao's army followed them until they reached the camp. When Zhang Yi saw that Cao Cao's army was in pursuit of Zhao Yun, and headed towards the main camp. He thought that they should close the gates and prepare for their assault. However, Zhao Yun ordered to have the gates wide open, lowered the flags and quieted the drums.

Seeing this, Cao Cao's army was fearful of some ambush therefore they withdrew. At this moment, Zhao Yun suddenly ordered to beat the drums with thundering sounds and along with crossbowmen, he led Liu Bei's forces as they pursued the retreated army. Cao Cao's soldiers panicked and while fleeing trampled over each other, with many among them drowning into the Han river.

== Aftermath ==
As Liu Bei later arrived and inspected the battlefield. He exclaimed: "Zilong is full of guts!" He ordered a celebration until late that night honoring Zhao Yun. From then on, Liu Bei's army called Zhao Yun "General of Tiger's Might" (虎威將軍).
