= Kessen II =

2001 video game

- North American cover art
- Developer: Koei
- Publisher: Koei
- Director: Takashi Atsumi
- Designer: Tomokazu Takeda
- Series: Kessen
- Platforms: PlayStation 2, PlayStation Network
- Release: JP: March 29, 2001; NA: September 26, 2001; PAL: March 15, 2002
- Genre: Real-time tactics
- Mode: Single-player

Kessen II (決戦 II, Kessen Tsu) is a strategy game developed and published by Koei that is loosely based on the Three Kingdoms period of China. It is the sequel to Kessen in name only; both Kessen and the later sequel Kessen III are based on events in Japan. The gameplay involves playing out major battles as the storyline progresses, with cutscenes between each battle for the development of the events and major characters. Before battle, players are given a choice of strategies to take, although they can manually control all units in the battlefield. All units are controlled by the AI unless the player directly intervenes, and battles between forces are carried out in real-time. While in control of a unit, players are able to use special skills or magic spells to turn the tables, although enemy characters are also able to do so.

Unlike Koei's other games based on the 14th century novel Romance of the Three Kingdoms (Dynasty Warriors and the Romance of the Three Kingdoms game), the plot of Kessen II is a heavily fantasized version of the novel. The last of the Han dynasty family, Liu Bei, begins a rebellion against the kingdom of Wei led by Cao Cao, with much of the game's events being based on the novel with alterations due to the different storylines. A significant change to the story involves a romance between Liu Bei and the character Diao Chan, being a significant factor behind Liu Bei's decision to go to war, and Himiko, a semi-fictional sorceress (the historical Himiko ruled Wa [ancient Japan]). In addition to the fantasized theme, Kessen II departs from its realistic predecessor. Koei introduces elements of magic, especially with the portrayal of notable strategists such as Zhuge Liang and Sima Yi as sorcerers. In battle, these characters are able to cause earthquakes, summon lightning storms and hurl fireballs.

== Characters ==
The majority of characters are loosely based on characters found in the Chinese epic Romance of the Three Kingdoms.

=== Liu Bei's Forces (Shu) ===
- Liu Bei - leader of the Shu forces and Lord of Xu, Liu is a lover of Diao Chan and unwilling ruler.
- Mei Sanniang - long-time female friend of Liu Bei, she is described as reckless and a beautiful. Her character was created for the game and is a heavily fictionalized combination and interpretation of Lady Mi and Hu Sanniang.
- Guan Yu - sworn brother of Liu Bei and Zhang Fei, he wields the Black Dragon and is Liu Bei's greatest warrior.
- Zhang Fei - sworn brother of Liu Bei and Guan Yu, he is a former bandit who is hot-tempered and overfond of drinking.
- Zhuge Liang - initially "unaligned" in the conflict he later becomes Liu Bei's main advisor and warlord. He is one of the most powerful magicians in the game.
- Zhao Yun - head of the Han Imperial Bodyguard, Zhao joins Liu Bei with the hope of restoring the Han Empire.
- Diao Chan - lover of Liu Bei, she is kidnapped at the start of the game by Cao Cao because she alone knows where the Mandate of Heaven exists.
- Mei Mei, Li Li, and Luo Luo - daughters of the Zhang Fei. Mei Mei is killed off-screen at the beginning of the game by Cao Cao's forces. They are loosely based on Zhang's historical daughters Empress Jing'ai & Empress Zhang.
- Guan Ping - adopted son of Guan Yu.
- Zhou Cang - general of Liu Bei who helps turn the tide against Cao Cao.
- Pang Tong - sworn brother of Zhuge Liang and a powerful magician.
- Huang Zhong - master of the bow and former officer of Liu Biao
- Cai Mao - former officer of Cao Cao who gets tricked into joining Liu Bei.
- Ma Su - a timid magician who Zhuge Liang recruits after the Battle of Chi Bi.
- Sun Li - sister of Sun Quan, she falls in love with Liu Bei and abandons her brother. Sun Li is based on the historical Lady Sun.
- Wei Yan - native of Jing who joins Liu Bei after the Battle of Fan Zheng.
- Jiang Wei - general who joins Liu Bei at the Battle of Tian Shui.
- Xu Shu - magician serving under Cao Cao who defects to Liu Bei.
- Huang Yue-Ying - eccentric wife of Zhuge Liang, she invents weapons and new equipment for Liu Bei.

=== Cao Cao's Forces (Wei) ===
- Cao Cao - leader of the Wei forces and a former officer for the Han Empire who has set out to conquer the world.
- Himiko - powerful sorcerer from a foreign land who serves Cao Cao. She is jealous of Diao Chan.
- Xun Yu - a female version of the historical Xun Yu, she is Cao Cao's main warlord, advisor, and a powerful magician.
- Hu Zhi - one of Cao Cao's strongest generals, she is good friends with Himiko. Hu Zhi is a female version of Xu Chu.
- Sima Yi - a wandering hermit who joins with Cao Cao later in the game to become his advisor and warlord. He is one of the most powerful magicians in the game.
- Xiahou Yuan - Cao Cao's most powerful general and warrior. He is killed by Zhang Fei in a duel in the early parts of the game.
- Cheng Yu - warlord of Cao Cao who is constantly playing the role of "scheming villain" and a powerful magician.
- Cao Ren - general and relative of Cao Cao.
- Zhang Liao - general of Cao Cao, he has a rivalry with Guan Yu since they used to be close friends, but fell out after a duel over a woman.
- Yu Jin - general of Cao Cao who is overly flamboyant and portrayed as a joke. He is attracted to Cao Cao for his "manliness" and portrayed as a queer character.
- Guo Jia - hermit who joins Cao Cao on the suggestion of Xun Yu.
- Cao Hong - officer and relative of Cao Cao with little to no character.
- Xiahou Ba - eldest son (historically the second son) of Xiahou Yuan, he tries to live up to his father.
- Cao Bu - uncle of Cao Cao who tries to get Cao Cao to return to a way of peace. Cao Bu is a fictional character loosely based on the historical Cao Song, father of Cao Cao.
- Dong Xuanfeng & Xi Xuanfeng - two female warriors and assassins who work for Cao Cao's general Yu Jin. They are original characters created for the game.
- Yue Jin - officer of Cao Cao, both he and Li Dian are portrayed as insecure.
- Li Dian - officer of Cao Cao, both he and Yue Jin are portrayed as insecure.
- Xu Huang - former officer of the Han Empire who is recruited to Cao Cao's cause.
- Zhang He - a strange masked officer serving Cao Cao.
- Xiahou Dun - one-eyed warrior who is the brother to Xiahou Yuan.
- Guo Shao - officer who joins Cao Cao at the Battle of Tian Shui, he is based on the historical general Hao Zhao.

=== Sun Quan's Forces (Wu) ===
- Sun Quan - ruler of Wu, his main focus is defending his territory.
- Zhou Yu - the main warlord of Wu and advisor to Sun Quan.
- Gan Ning - Wu's most powerful general and a former pirate.
- Lu Meng - magician serving Sun Quan.
- Lu Su - magician serving Sun Quan.
- Lu Xun - magician serving Sun Quan.
- Taishi Ci - officer serving Sun Quan.

=== Other ===
==== Forces of Xi ====
- Cai Wengi - ruler of the Northern Xi, Wengi is a powerful general and magician. She can join either Cao Cao or Liu Bei depending on who defeats her. She is a highly fictionalized version of the historical poet and writer Cai Yan.
- Deng Ai - officer under Cai Wengi and Ma Chao, he defects to Cao Cao.
- Ma Chao - ruler of Western Xi, joins Liu Bei after a failed attack on Cao Cao.
- Ma Dai - officer under Cai Wengi and Ma Chao, defects to Liu Bei.
- Pang De - officer under Ma Chao, joins Cao Cao after the Battle of Tong Gate.

==== Forces of Liu Zhang ====
- Liu Zhang - ruler of the Yi Province, he is an old warrior and friend of Cao Bu.
- Fa Zheng - advisor to Liu Zhang who joins Liu Bei after Liu Zhang is defeated. He is a powerful magician.
- Yan Yan - general of Liu Zhang who is tricked into joining Liu Bei by Zhao Yun.
- Wu Yi - officer of Liu Zhang.
- Zhang Ren - officer of Liu Zhang.

==== Forces of Meng Huo ====
- Meng Huo - king of southern Yi, Meng is dominated by his wife Zhu Rong.
- Zhu Rong - Queen of southern Yi. Advisor and the true ruler, she joins Liu Bei after she and Meng Huo is defeated.
- King Mulu - general under Meng Huo and a magician.
- Wu Tugu - general under Meng Huo.
- King Duosi - general under Meng Huo and a magician.

==== Miscellaneous ====
- Liu Biao - mentioned but not seen, he is later conquered by Cao Cao off-screen.
- Yuan Shao - mentioned but not seen, he is later conquered by Cao Cao off-screen.

== Battles ==
The game portrays the following historical battles and conflicts in a highly condensed and fictionalized version:

- Cao Cao's invasion of Xu Province - named the Battle of Xu
- Battle of Bowang - named the Battle of Bo Wan Po
- Battle of Changban - named the Battle of Chang Ban Po
- Battle of Red Cliffs - named Showdown at Chi Bi
- Liu Bei's takeover of Yi Province - named the Siege of Cheng Du
- Battle of Mt. Dingjun - named Mt. Dinjun
- Southern Campaign
- Battle of Fancheng - named Battle of Fan Zheng
- Battle of Tong Pass - named Battle of Tong Gate
- Tianshui revolts - named Battle of Tian Shui
- Siege of Chencang - named Defense of Chen Cang
- Lü Meng's Invasion of Jing Province - named Battle of Wu Chang (Liu Bei)
- Cao Pi's invasion of Eastern Wu - named Battle of Wu Chang (Cao Cao)
- Zhuge Liang's Northern Expeditions - named Wei-Shu Conflict

== Release ==
Kessen II was released in Japan for the PlayStation 2 on March 29, 2001. THQ handled distribution of the game in Europe as part of a four-game deal with Koei.

== Reception ==
Reception

Aggregate scores
Aggregator	Score
GameRankings	75.42%
Metacritic	71/100

Review scores
Publication	Score
Electronic Gaming Monthly	7/10
Eurogamer	8/10
Famitsu	9/10, 8/10, 9/10, 9/10
Game Informer	8/10
GamePro	3/5
GameSpot	7.7/10
GameSpy	78%
IGN	8.4/10
Official U.S. PlayStation Magazine	3/5
X-Play	3/5

The game received "average" reviews, according to video game review score aggregator Metacritic. In Japan, the four reviewers Famitsu complimented the game. They compared the game to the Romance of the Three Kingdoms series, saying it dispels the image of Koei's historical simulation games only being for hardcore fans with one reviewer saying fans of the series may find this game lacking, while another was surprised at how humorous it was. Other reviewers complimented the increase of gameplay depth from the previous game and more easy to use controls while others praised the visuals during the battle scenes.
