= Xiahou Lingnü =

3rd-century Chinese Cao Wei noblewoman

Xiahou Lingnü 夏侯令女
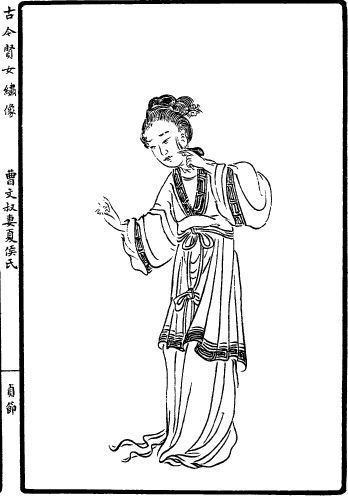
- Portrait of Xiahou Lingnü
- Occupation: Aristocrat
- Spouse: Cao Wenshu (Cao Shuang's cousin)
- Children: at least one adopted son
- Father: Xiahou Wenning

Xiahou Lingnü (夏侯令女; fl.240-249) was a Chinese noblewoman, member of the aristocrat Xiahou clan during the Three Kingdoms period. Alongside her family, she served her entire life the state of Cao Wei, a major faction in Three Kingdoms era. She is best known for her role in events before the Incident at the Gaoping Tombs; she remained loyal to Cao Wei and protested her family's wishes for her to remarry and join Sima Yi's coup d'état against Cao Shuang, cutting off one of her facial organs each time she was asked. Her actions were admired by her political rival, Sima Yi, who gave her the role to continue the legacy of the Cao lineage.

The most notable information about her comes from Huangfu Mi's Biographies of Exemplary Women (Lienü Zhuan), which was supposed to be an instructional text for Confucian women. Her fierce loyalty to the Cao family even when they were in disgrace was held as an exemplary virtue performed by a woman in Confucian culture.

== Genealogy and arrival to the Cao family ==
Xiahou Lingnü was the daughter of Xiahou Wenning. Among her relatives are the famous generals Xiahou Dun and Xiahou Yuan, who served Cao Cao the founder of the state of Cao Wei. Other possible relatives of her are; Lady Xiahou, who married Zhang Fei from Shu Han state; Xiahou Ba, a Cao Wei general who defected to Shu State shortly after the Jiang Wei's Northern Expeditions; and Xiahou Hui, member of the Cao family and wife of Sima Shi (Sima Yi's eldest son), her death could have started tensions between the Sima clan and the Cao clan. The daughters of Lady Xiahou (wife of Zhang Fei and niece of Xiahou Yuan), Empress Jing'ai and Empress Zhang became empresses of the state of Shu Han, making the Xiahou clan divided between the two factions.

Lingnu entered a political marriage with the regent Cao Shuang's cousin Cao Wenshu (曹文叔), making her an upper class aristocrat. During the marriage she had no children.

== Incident at Gaoping Tombs ==
Shortly before a coup d'état against Cao Shuang began, Xiahou Lingnü's husband died. Due to the growing contention against the members of the Cao clan and the growing popularity of the Sima clan, Lingnu's father joined the traitorous forces against Cao Wei.

In order to sever ties with Cao Wei, Xiahou Wenning decided to marry Lingnu into a new family. So great was her desire to preserve her honor and her allegiance to the Cao family that she cut her hair and ears as a sign of refusal.

In 5 February 249, Cao Shuang and his two brothers, Cao Xi (曹羲) and Cao Xun, left the imperial capital Luoyang to accompany the emperor Cao Fang to pay respects to his ancestors at the Gaoping Tombs (高平陵). After that, they proceeded to go on a hunting expedition outside Luoyang. Sima Yi, a famous general who Lingnu's father admired, seized the opportunity to launch a coup d'état and take command of the military forces stationed in Luoyang.

When Sima Yi took control of the capital city of Luoyang and issuing a memorial which listed out the various crimes Cao Shuang had committed. Cao Shuang surrendered and gave up his powers after further receiving reassurance that he and his family would be spared. After this, Sima Yi then went to see Empress Dowager Guo and coerced her into issuing an imperial order for the arrest of Cao Shuang and his brothers under charges of treason. In 9 February, Cao Shuang, his brothers, and his supporters were charged with treason and executed along with their families.

After Cao Shuang's death, Xiahou Lingnü cut her nose in response to her family's request to sever ties with the disgraced Cao clan. Aghast at her actions, they said, "Our life in this world is like a particle of light dust on a blade of weak grass. Why torment yourself to this extent? Besides, your husband’s family is completely exterminated. What purpose does it serve for you to persevere in your chastity?".

Insulting her family's cowardly act, Lingnu replied:

"I have heard that a person of worth does not renounce his principles because of changes in fortune, nor a righteous person change his mind with a view to preservation or destruction. While the Cao flourished, I was bent on keeping my chastity. Now that they have declined and perished, can I bear to renounce them? Even animals do not act this way; how can I?"

When Sima Yi heard of Lingnu's heroic action, he praised her loyalty and allowed her to adopt a son related to Cao Shuang, so that she could continue the Cao lineage. The coup d'état increased the Sima family's influence and paved the way for the eventual replacement of the Cao Wei regime by the Sima family's Jin dynasty in 266. A poem was written in her honor in Romance of the Three Kingdoms

What is a man to be mindful of?

A grain of dust on a blade of grass; Such virtue as Lady Xiahou had Stands out sublime as the ages pass. This fair young wife of gentle mien Dared all to maintain her purpose high. What people though strong in the flush of life

Have equaled her in constancy?

Xiahou Lingnü continued in the domain of the Sima clan. She raised a son who was directly related to Cao Cao. With this child, she was charged with continuing the legacy of the Cao family.

== See also ==
- Zhao E, another woman from the Three Kingdoms who was recorded in Huangfu Mi's Biographies of Exemplary Women.

== Sources ==
- Lee, Lily Xiao Hong & Stefanowska, A.D. (2007). Biographical Dictionary of Chinese women: Antiquity through Sui, 1600 B.C.E-618 C.E. M.E. Sharpe, Inc.
