= Zhao Yun =

Chinese military general (died 229)

- 趙雲
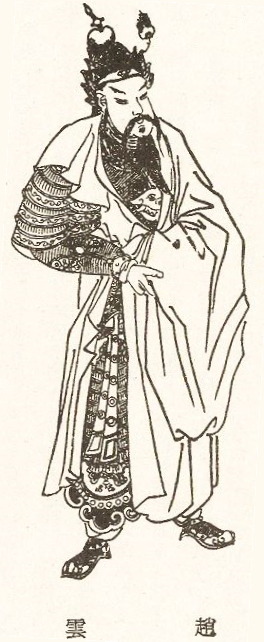
- A Qing dynasty illustration of Zhao Yun

General Who Guards the Army (中護軍)
- In office 227 – 229
- Monarch: Liu Shan
- Chancellor: Zhuge Liang

General Who Guards the East (鎮東將軍)
- In office c. early 220s – 227
- Monarch: Liu Shan
- Chancellor: Zhuge Liang

General Who Attacks the South (征南將軍)
- In office 223 – c. early 220s
- Monarch: Liu Shan
- Chancellor: Zhuge Liang

General of the Assisting Army (翊軍將軍) (under Liu Bei)
- In office 214 – c. early 220s
- Monarch: Emperor Xian of Han

Administrator of Guiyang (桂陽太守) (under Liu Bei)
- In office c. 209 – 214
- Monarch: Emperor Xian of Han
- Preceded by: Zhao Fan

Lieutenant-General (偏將軍) (under Liu Bei)
- In office c. 209 – 214
- Monarch: Emperor Xian of Han

General of the Standard (牙門將軍) (under Liu Bei)
- In office 208 – ?
- Monarch: Emperor Xian of Han

Personal details
- Born: (Unknown) Zhengding County, Hebei
- Died: 229
- Children: Zhao Tong; Zhao Guang
- Occupation: General
- Courtesy name: Zilong (子龍)
- Posthumous name: Marquis Shunping (順平侯)
- Peerage: Marquis of Yongchang Village (永昌亭侯)

Zhao Yun (Chinese: 趙雲) (died 229), courtesy name Zilong (子龍), was a Chinese military general who lived during the late Eastern Han dynasty and early Three Kingdoms period.

A native of Changshan, originally a subordinate of the northern warlord Gongsun Zan, Zhao Yun later came to serve another warlord, Liu Bei, and had since accompanied him on most of his military exploits, from the Battle of Changban (208) to the Hanzhong Campaign (217–219). He continued serving in the state of Shu Han – founded by Liu Bei in 221 – in the Three Kingdoms period and participated in the first of the Northern Expeditions until his death in 229. While many facts about Zhao Yun's life remain unclear due to limited information in historical sources, some aspects and activities in his life have been dramatised or exaggerated in folklore and fiction. In the 14th-century historical novel Romance of the Three Kingdoms, he was lauded as a member of the Five Tiger Generals under Liu Bei.

== Historical sources on Zhao Yun's life ==
Zhao Yun's original biography in the Records of the Three Kingdoms (Sanguozhi), written by Chen Shou in the third century, is only 346 Chinese characters long. In the fifth century, Pei Songzhi added annotations from the Zhao Yun Biezhuan (趙雲別傳; Unofficial Biography of Zhao Yun) to Zhao Yun's biography in the Sanguozhi, providing a relatively clear, though still incomplete picture of Zhao Yun's life.

== Early career under Gongsun Zan ==
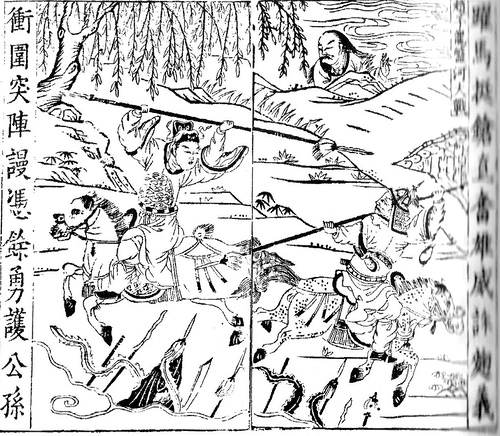
Zhao Yun displays valour in front of Gongsun Zan, an illustration from a Qing dynasty edition of the historical novel Romance of the Three Kingdoms.

Zhao Yun was from Zhending County, Changshan Commandery. The Zhao Yun Biezhuan described his physical appearance as follows: eight chi tall (approximately 1.84 metres), with majestic and impressive looks.

After receiving a recommendation from the Administrator of Changshan Commandery to serve in the government, Zhao Yun led a small group of volunteers to join Gongsun Zan, a warlord in You Province. Around the time, the warlord Yuan Shao had experienced a surge in fame after his recent appointment as the Governor of Ji Province, so Gongsun Zan was worried that many people in You Province would choose to serve under Yuan Shao instead of him.

When Zhao Yun showed up with his volunteers, Gongsun Zan asked him mockingly: "I heard that all those in your home province (Note: Changshan Commandery was in Ji Province.) wanted to serve the Yuans. Why did you have a change of heart, and decide to correct your mistake?" Zhao Yun replied: "The Empire is in a state of chaos, and it is unclear who is right and who is wrong. The people are in danger. Those in my home province, after careful deliberation, decided to follow a lord who governs with benevolence. Therefore, I chose to join you, General, instead of Lord Yuan." Gongsun Zan then accepted him. Zhao Yun later fought on Gongsun Zan's side in some battles against rival forces.

== Meeting Liu Bei ==
Around the early 190s, Zhao Yun met Liu Bei, who was taking shelter under Gongsun Zan at the time. Zhao Yun became very close to Liu Bei and desired to switch his allegiance to Liu Bei. When Gongsun Zan sent Liu Bei to assist his ally, Tian Kai, in a battle against Yuan Shao, Zhao Yun followed Liu Bei and served as a cavalry officer under Liu Bei.

When Zhao Yun received news of his elder brother's death, he asked for a temporary leave of absence from Liu Bei to mourn his brother. Liu Bei knew that Zhao Yun would not return after leaving, so he held Zhao Yun's hand while bidding him farewell. Before departing, Zhao Yun told Liu Bei: "I will never forget your favour."

== Service under Liu Bei ==
In early 200, after Liu Bei lost his base in Xu Province to his rival Cao Cao, he fled north across the Yellow River and sought refuge under Yuan Shao, Cao Cao's rival. Around the same time, Zhao Yun also came to Ye, Yuan Shao's headquarters, where he met Liu Bei again. Zhao Yun and Liu Bei shared the same room during their stay in Ye.

Liu Bei secretly instructed Zhao Yun to help him gather hundreds of men who were willing to follow him, and claim that they served under the General of the Left (左將軍). (Note: Liu Bei was appointed General of the Left (左將軍) by the Han central government in early 199 after the Battle of Xiapi.) Yuan Shao was unaware of this. Zhao Yun then accompanied Liu Bei and his followers as they left Yuan Shao and headed south to join Liu Biao, the Governor of Jing Province.

=== Battle of Bowang ===
In 202, when Cao Cao was away on campaigns in northern China against Yuan Shao's sons and their allies, Liu Bei took advantage of Cao Cao's absence to launch an attack on Cao Cao's territories in central China. Cao Cao sent his general Xiahou Dun and others to lead an army to resist Liu Bei.

During the battle, Zhao Yun captured Xiahou Lan (夏侯蘭), an old friend who was from the same hometown as him. He requested that Liu Bei spare Xiahou Lan's life and recommended Xiahou Lan to serve as a military judge because he knew that Xiahou Lan was knowledgeable about law. Zhao Yun earned praise for being conscientious and careful when he maintained a professional relationship with Xiahou Lan despite their friendship.

=== Battle of Changban ===
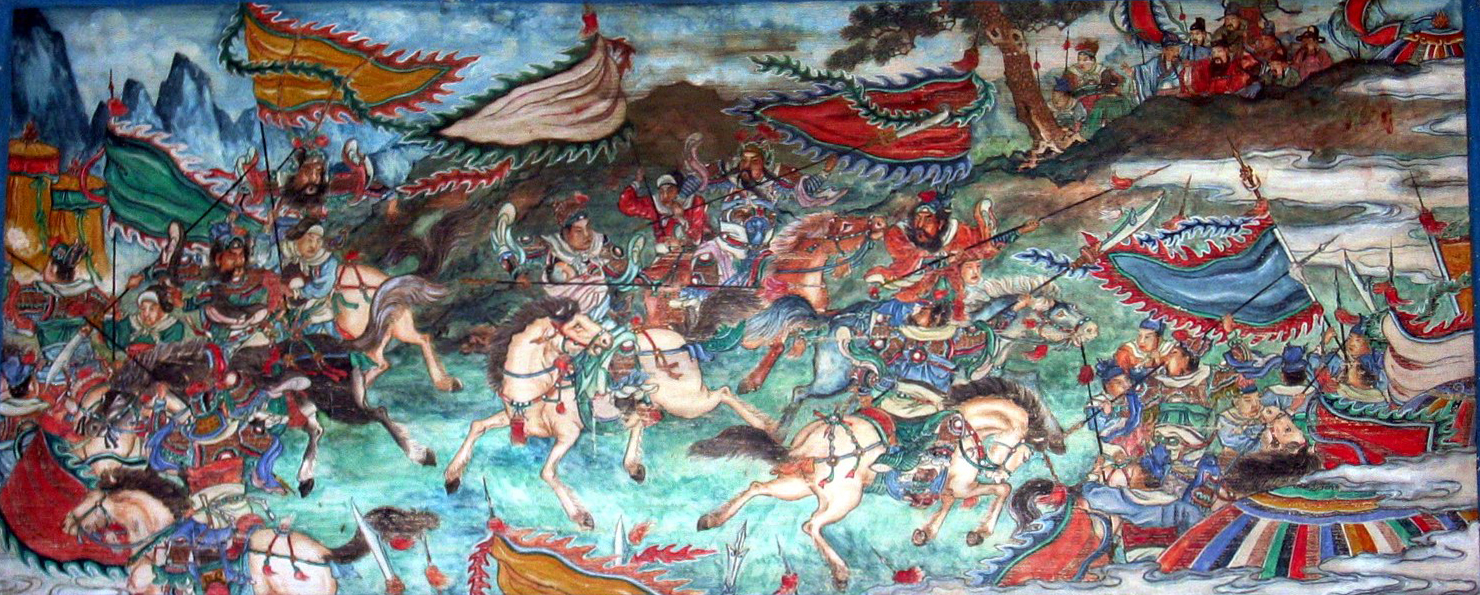
A mural depicting Zhao Yun at the Battle of Changban inside the Long Corridor at the Summer Palace in Beijing. The rider in white is Zhao Yun.

After Liu Biao died in 208, his younger son Liu Cong succeeded him as the Governor of Jing Province. When Cao Cao launched a military campaign in the same year to eliminate opposing forces in southern China, Liu Cong surrendered and yielded Jing Province to him. Liu Bei and his followers abandoned their stronghold in Xinye County and headed further south towards Xiakou, which was guarded by Liu Biao's elder son Liu Qi and was independent of Cao Cao's control.

Cao Cao personally led a 5,000-strong elite cavalry force to pursue Liu Bei. They caught up with Liu Bei at Changban and inflicted a devastating defeat on his forces. While Liu Bei abandoned his family and fled, Zhao Yun carried Liu Bei's young son Liu Shan and protected Liu Bei's wife Lady Gan (Liu Shan's mother) during the battle and delivered them to safety. He was later promoted to the rank of General of the Standard (牙門將軍) for his efforts.

Earlier on, after his defeat at Changban, Liu Bei heard rumours that Zhao Yun had betrayed him and defected to Cao Cao' side. Refusing to believe the rumours, he threw a short ji to the ground and said: "Zilong will never abandon me." He was right as Zhao Yun returned to him a short while later.

=== As the Administrator of Guiyang ===
Zhao Yun was later promoted to Lieutenant-General (偏將軍) for his contributions towards Liu Bei's conquests of the four commanderies in southern Jing Province: Changsha, Lingling, Wuling and Guiyang. After the capture of Guiyang Commandery, Liu Bei appointed Zhao Yun as the new Administrator to replace Zhao Fan.

Zhao Fan had a widowed sister-in-law who was famous for her beauty. He wanted to arrange for her to marry Zhao Yun so as to build connections with Zhao Yun. However, Zhao Yun rejected the idea and told Zhao Fan: "We share the same family name. Your elder brother is also like an elder brother to me."

There were others who urged Zhao Yun to accept the marriage but Zhao Yun firmly refused and said: "Zhao Fan was forced to surrender because of the circumstances. His intentions are unclear and suspicious. Besides, there are many other women in this world." Not long later, Zhao Fan escaped, and Zhao Yun was able to avoid any association with him because he did not agree to the marriage.

=== Guarding Jing Province ===
Around 211, Liu Bei led an army west into Yi Province to assist the provincial governor Liu Zhang in countering a rival warlord, Zhang Lu of Hanzhong Commandery. Zhao Yun and others remained behind to guard Jing Province.

Sometime in 209, Liu Bei married Sun Quan's younger sister, Lady Sun, to strengthen the Sun–Liu alliance. Lady Sun also remained in Jing Province when Liu Bei left for Yi Province. As she saw herself as the sister of a powerful warlord, Lady Sun not only acted in an arrogant and unbridled manner, but also allowed her bodyguards and personal staff to behave lawlessly in Jing Province. For this reason, Liu Bei specially appointed Zhao Yun, whom he deemed a serious and conscientious person, to oversee domestic affairs in Jing Province and maintain law and order during his absence. When Sun Quan heard that Liu Bei had left for Yi Province, he sent a vessel to fetch his sister home. Lady Sun attempted to bring Liu Bei's son Liu Shan along with her, but Zhao Yun and Zhang Fei led their men to stop her and retrieved Liu Shan.

The Chronicles of Han and Jin (漢晉春秋) written by the Jin historian Xi Zuochi gives a similar account to the one recorded into the Zhao Yun Biezhuan.

=== Conquest of Yi Province ===
Liu Bei and Liu Zhang were friendly towards each other in the beginning, but tensions between them gradually increased until the point of armed conflict around late 212. Liu Bei was initially stationed at Jiameng Pass (葭萌關; in present-day Zhaohua District, Guangyuan, Sichuan), where he was helping Liu Zhang defend the area from Zhang Lu. However, he turned against Liu Zhang later and attacked him. He ordered Zhuge Liang, Zhang Fei, Zhao Yun and others to lead reinforcements from Jing Province into Yi Province to help him, while Guan Yu remained behind to defend Jing Province.

The reinforcements marched along the Yangtze River and conquered the commanderies and counties in the surrounding areas. When they reached Jiangzhou, Zhuge Liang ordered Zhao Yun to lead a separate force to attack Jiangyang Commandery (江陽郡; around present-day Neijiang, Sichuan) and take an alternate route, and later rendezvous with Liu Bei and the other armies outside Yi Province's capital, Chengdu. In 214, Liu Zhang gave up resistance and surrendered to Liu Bei, who gained control over Yi Province. Zhao Yun was appointed as General of the Assisting Army (翊軍將軍).

After taking Yi Province, Liu Bei held a discussion on how to distribute the households in Chengdu and the fields outside the city among his followers because he wanted to reward them for their efforts in the campaign. Zhao Yun objected:

"In the past, Huo Qubing said that there was no home until the Xiongnu had been eliminated. The enemies of the state in our time include not only the Xiongnu, so we shouldn't be complacent. Only when the Empire has been completely pacified and the people have reverted to their peaceful lives, can we truly enjoy ourselves. The war in Yi Province has just ended, so the people in the province should have their lands and homes returned to them. As of now, the people should be allowed to continue their livelihoods in peace, and later we can impose taxes and conscription on them. In this way, we will earn their favour and support."

Liu Bei heeded Zhao Yun's advice.

=== Battle of Han River ===
In 217, Liu Bei launched the Hanzhong Campaign to seize control of Hanzhong Commandery from Cao Cao because Hanzhong was the northern gateway into Yi Province. Liu Bei's general Huang Zhong killed Cao Cao's general Xiahou Yuan at the Battle of Mount Dingjun of 218–219.

After Xiahou Yuan's defeat, Huang Zhong heard that enemy troops were transporting food supplies in the vicinity so he led a detachment of troops to attack the convoy and seize the supplies. When Huang Zhong did not return to camp in time, Zhao Yun led tens of horsemen out in search of Huang Zhong.

At the time, Cao Cao had sent his forces to attack Liu Bei's positions. Zhao Yun encountered Cao Cao's vanguard force and engaged them in battle until Cao Cao's main force showed up and surrounded him. Despite the overwhelming odds, Zhao Yun attempted to charge and break through the enemy formation and alternated between fighting back and retreating. Cao Cao's forces regrouped, got back into formation and surrounded Zhao Yun. Left with no choice, Zhao Yun had to fight his way out and head back to camp. During the battle, Zhao Yun's deputy Zhang Zhu (張著) was wounded but Zhao Yun turned back, saved him and brought him back to camp.

Cao Cao's forces pursued Zhao Yun as he retreated to his camp. Upon seeing the enemy's approach, Zhao Yun's subordinate Zhang Yi wanted to shut the camp's gates and get the troops to hold their position. However, Zhao Yun ordered the gates to be opened, all flags and banners to be hidden, and the war drums to be silenced so as to create an illusion of an empty camp. Cao Cao's forces thought that there was an ambush inside Zhao Yun's camp so they withdrew. Just as they were retreating, Zhao Yun launched a counterattack and his men beat the war drums loudly and fired arrows at the enemy. Cao Cao's soldiers were shocked and thrown into disarray. Some of them trampled on each other as they panicked and fled, while many of them fell into the Han River and drowned.

The following day, when Liu Bei came to inspect Zhao Yun's camp and survey the battlefield, he remarked: "Zilong is full of courage." He then threw a feast to celebrate Zhao Yun's victory and they made merry until nightfall. Zhao Yun was also given the nickname "General of Tiger's Might" (虎威將軍).

=== Battle of Xiaoting ===
In late 219, Sun Quan broke the Sun–Liu alliance by sending his general Lü Meng to launch a stealth invasion of Liu Bei's territories in southern Jing Province while Guan Yu was away at the Battle of Fancheng against Cao Cao's forces. Guan Yu was later captured in an ambush and executed on Sun Quan's order when he refused to surrender.

Liu Bei bore a grudge against Sun Quan for the loss of Jing Province and wanted to attack Sun Quan. Zhao Yun attempted to dissuade him by saying:

"The real enemy of the State is Cao Cao, not Sun Quan. We should eliminate Wei first, then Wu will surrender on its own. Cao Cao is already dead but his son Cao Pi has usurped the throne. You should follow the people's will by conquering Guanzhong and then move across the Wei River to attack the treacherous villain. Righteous people who live in the east of Hangu Pass will certainly welcome your army with supplies and horses. You shouldn't ignore Wei for the moment and wage war against Wu first. Once the war starts, it can't be stopped."

Liu Bei ignored Zhao Yun's advice and proceeded with his quest for vengeance by personally leading a military campaign against Sun Quan. He left Zhao Yun behind to guard Jiangzhou.

In October 222, Liu Bei suffered a devastating defeat at the Battle of Xiaoting against Sun Quan's forces, and was forced to retreat to Baidicheng. By the time Zhao Yun showed up with reinforcements at Yong'an, Sun Quan's forces had given up on pursuing Liu Bei and retreated to Wu.

== Service under Liu Shan ==
After Liu Bei died in June 223, his son Liu Shan succeeded him as the emperor of Shu, with the Imperial Chancellor Zhuge Liang serving as regent because Liu Shan was still underage at the time. Following his coronation, Liu Shan appointed Zhao Yun as Central Protector of the Army (中護軍) and General Who Attacks the South (征南將軍), and enfeoffed him as the Marquis of Yongchang Village (永昌亭侯). He promoted Zhao Yun to the position of General Who Guards the East (鎮東將軍) later.

=== Battle of Ji Valley ===
In 227, Zhao Yun moved to the staging area at Hanzhong Commandery to join Zhuge Liang, who had mobilised military forces from throughout Shu in preparation for a large-scale military campaign against Shu's rival state, Wei.

In the spring of 228, Zhuge Liang ordered Zhao Yun and Deng Zhi to lead a detachment of troops to Ji Valley (箕谷) and pretend to attack Mei County (郿縣; southeast of present-day Fufeng County, Shaanxi) via Xie Valley (斜谷). Their mission was to distract and hold the Wei general Cao Zhen's attention, while Zhuge Liang led the Shu main army to attack Mount Qi (祁山; the mountainous regions around present-day Li County, Gansu).

Zhao Yun and Deng Zhi lost to Cao Zhen at the battle in Ji Valley because Zhuge Liang had given them command of the weaker soldiers while he led the better troops to attack Mount Qi. Nevertheless, Zhao Yun managed to rally his men into putting up a firm defence as they retreated, thus minimising their losses.

After the Shu forces managed to retreat to Hanzhong, Zhao Yun was demoted to the position of General Who Guards the Army (鎮軍將軍) as punishment for his defeat at Ji Valley. During this time, Zhuge Liang asked Zhao Yun and Deng Zhi: "When our troops withdrew from Jieting, they were very disorganised. However, those who retreated from Ji Valley were orderly. Why is it so?" Deng Zhi replied: "(Zhao) Yun personally led the rearguard. He ensured that our troops retreated in an orderly manner and left no equipment behind."

As Zhao Yun still had some silk left in his unit, Zhuge Liang wanted to distribute it among the troops to raise their morale. However, Zhao Yun disagreed: "The campaign was a failure, so why should rewards be given out? Please store the silk in the official treasury now and distribute it among the men later during the tenth month as a season gift for winter." Zhuge Liang heeded Zhao Yun's suggestion.

== Death and posthumous honours ==
Zhao Yun died in 229. Zhao was posthumously honoured as "Marquis Shunping" (順平侯; Shùnpíng hóu) by Liu Shan in April or May 261.

During Liu Bei's reign, only Fa Zheng received posthumous honours. In Liu Shan's time, only three consecutive heads of government – Zhuge Liang, Jiang Wan and Fei Yi – received posthumous titles. Later, Liu Shan also posthumously honoured Chen Zhi, whom he favoured, and Xiahou Ba, a Wei general who defected to Shu. Guan Yu, Zhang Fei, Ma Chao, Pang Tong, Huang Zhong and Zhao Yun were also awarded posthumous titles by Liu Shan as well. At the time, it was a great honour for a person to receive a posthumous title.

Liu Shan's imperial edict for awarding Zhao Yun his posthumous title read: "Zhao Yun followed the Late Emperor and he made outstanding contributions. I was young then and experienced many difficulties, but I relied on his loyalty and faithfulness to get out of danger. I bestow this posthumous name on him to recognise him for his meritorious service and also because there were others who advised me to do so."

The name of Zhao Yun's posthumous title was suggested by Jiang Wei and others – shun (順; shùn; literally "obey / follow") because he was virtuous and kind, ping (平; píng; literally "peace / pacify") because he performed his duties up to standard and overcame chaos, so shun and ping became "Shunping". (Note: According to the "Rules of assigning posthumous names" chapter in the Yi Zhou Shu, a person can be given a posthumous name "Ping" based on several criteria: administering without fault; complying with regulations when handling matters; enforcing rules and order. Jiang Wei also specifically mentioned that Zhao Yun's ability to "overcome and pacify disasters and chaos" (克定禍亂) made him deserving of the posthumous name "Ping". Based on the rules in the Yi Zhou Shu, to qualify for the posthumous name "Shun", a person had to be highly respected and must be known for being kind and benevolent.))

== Family ==
Zhao Yun's eldest son, Zhao Tong (趙統; Zhào Tǒng), served as an officer in the huben (虎賁) division of the imperial guards.

Zhao Yun's second son, Zhao Guang (趙廣; Zhào Guǎng), served as an Officer of the Standard (牙門將). He accompanied the Shu general Jiang Wei in the campaigns against Wei, and was killed in action in Tazhong (沓中; northwest of present-day Zhugqu County, Gansu).

== Appraisal ==
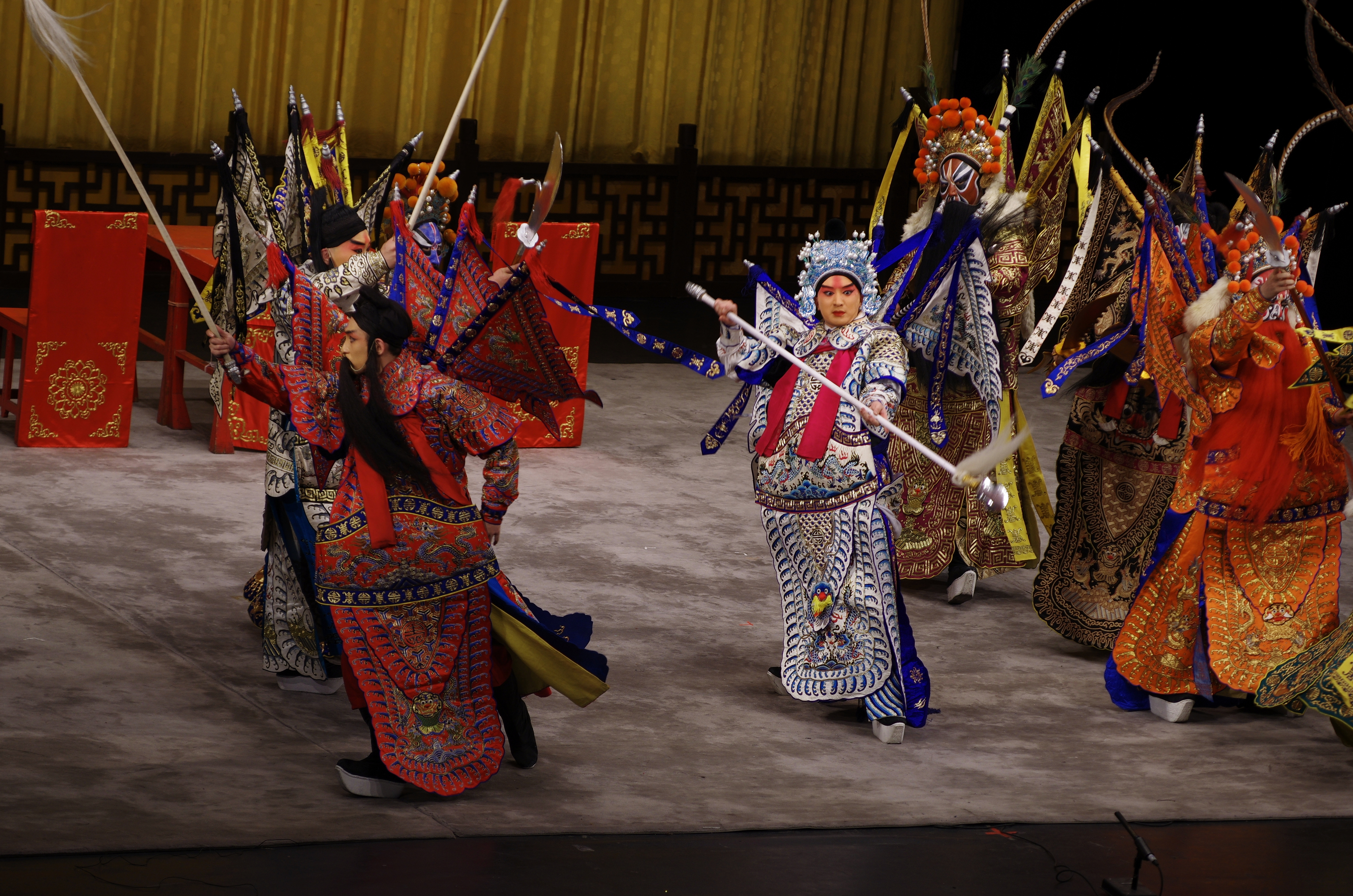
Zhao Yun (center) surrounded by Cao Cao's generals in the Battle of Changban, from a 2015 Peking opera performance by Shanghai Jingju Theatre Company at Tianchan Theatre, Shanghai.

Chen Shou, who wrote Zhao Yun's biography in the Sanguozhi, commented on Zhao Yun as follows: "Huang Zhong and Zhao Yun were fierce and mighty warriors, just like claws and teeth. Were they the successors to Guan and Teng?"

== In Romance of the Three Kingdoms ==
Many of Zhao Yun's actual exploits were highly dramatised in the 14th-century historical novel Romance of the Three Kingdoms. In the novel, Zhao Yun is portrayed as an almost perfect warrior – one who possesses powerful combat skills, unwavering loyalty to his lord, tremendous courage, keen intelligence, and serene charisma. These traits have often been reflected in nearly all modern materials about Zhao Yun to date.

See the following for some fictitious stories in Romance of the Three Kingdoms involving Zhao Yun:

- Battle of Changban#In Romance of the Three Kingdoms
- Battle of Xiaoting#In Romance of the Three Kingdoms

== In popular culture ==
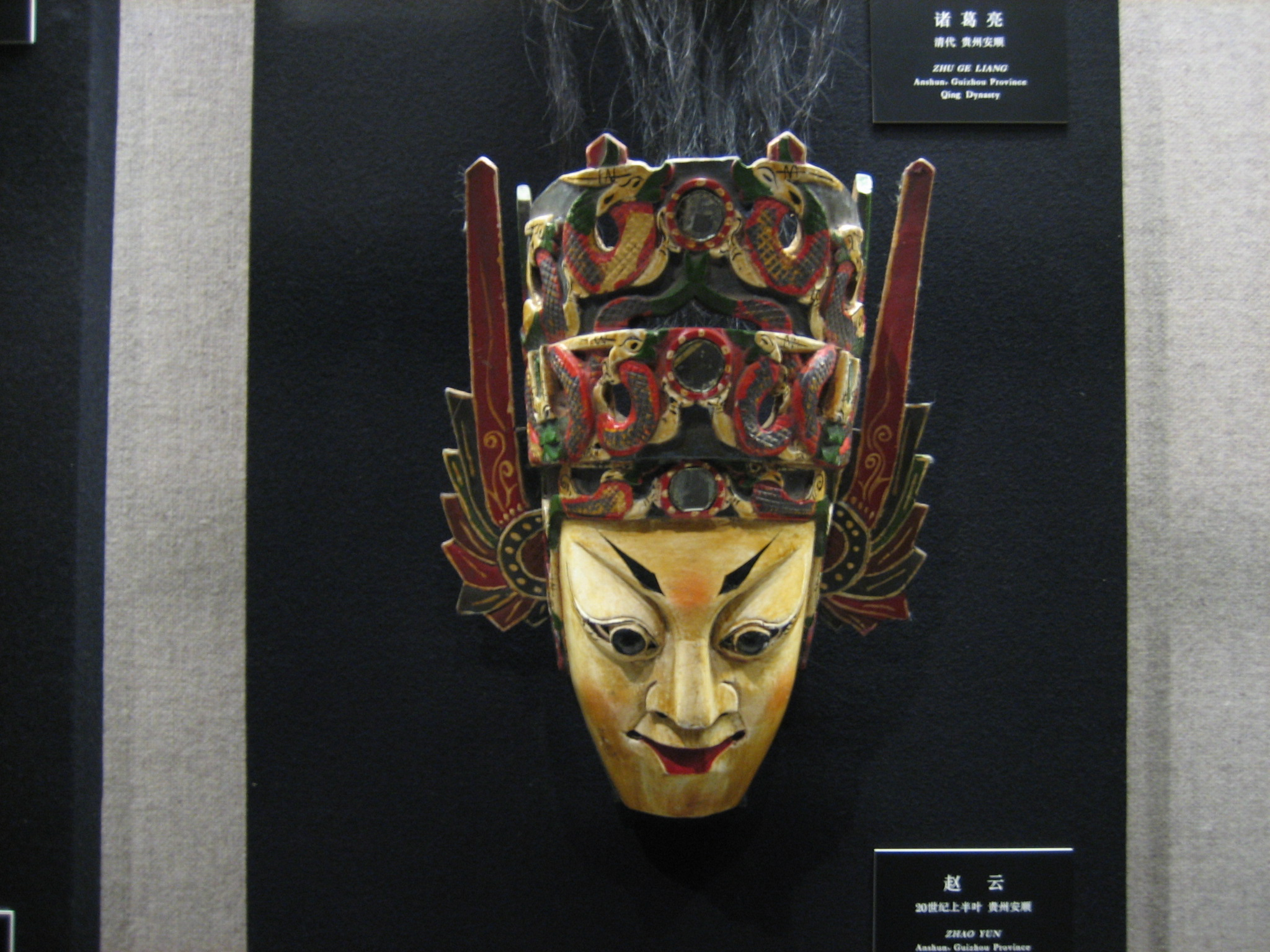
Mask of Zhao Yun used in folk opera

Zhao Yun has been featured prominently in Chinese and Japanese popular culture, literature, art and anecdotes. Zhao Yun was already a relatively well-known hero from the Three Kingdoms period, as folktales about his exploits have been passed down through centuries. He became a household name due to the popularity of the 14th-century historical novel Romance of the Three Kingdoms.

=== Religion ===
Zhao Yun sometimes appears as a door god in Chinese and Taoist temples in Henan, usually in partnership with Ma Chao.

=== Folklore ===
Zhao Yun is strongly associated with the color white in several Three Kingdoms media, which is a callback to his appearance as stated in Romance of the Three Kingdoms. People can see an interpretation of him in the Summer Palace, which has a famous painting of his heroics at Changban. White is linked to several positive traits within various fictional mediums, including honesty, virtue, purity and so on. One other reason for Zhao Yun being linked with the color may be due to a myth regarding the horse the general favored. A quick steed in its own right, it is fabled to run one thousand leagues during the day and five hundred leagues at night. The horse's name is supposedly the "White Dragon Horse" (白龍駒, Bailongju).

Another strong image for Zhao Yun in various Three Kingdoms fiction is the idea of him wielding a spear, often said to be a long spear. Its name is roughly translated as "Shore Edge Spear" (涯角槍, Yajiaoqiang) in legends and it allegedly makes an unnamed appearance in the Sanguozhi Pinghua. The weapon's revered namesake means that it "[has] none surpassing it, even in the heavenly sea of stars". Measuring in at a length of nine chi (approximately three meters or ten feet in modern conversions), Zhao Yun is said to have wielded it with magnificent skill. If one is to believe the tales, Zhao Yun used the same spear to defeat Zhang Fei in a duel. At times, Zhao Yun is associated with one of Cao Cao's twin swords from Romance of the Three Kingdoms. In this tale, he killed Xiahou En while rescuing A Dou from peril.

There is a Chinese folktale about Zhao Yun's death which is not mentioned in the 14th-century novel Romance of the Three Kingdoms. In this story, Zhao Yun had never been wounded in battle before so there were no scars on his body. One day, while he was taking a bath, his wife pricked him with a sewing needle out of mischief. Zhao Yun began to bleed profusely and eventually died of shock.

=== Film and television ===
The 2008 Hong Kong film Three Kingdoms: Resurrection of the Dragon is loosely based on stories related to Zhao Yun in the historical novel Romance of the Three Kingdoms. It was directed by Daniel Lee and starred Hong Kong actor Andy Lau as "Zhao Zilong". Mainland Chinese actor Hu Jun portrayed Zhao Yun in John Woo's Red Cliff, a two-part epic war film based on the Battle of Red Cliffs.

Notable actors who have portrayed Zhao Yun in television series include: Zhang Shan, in Romance of the Three Kingdoms (1994); Nie Yuan, in Three Kingdoms (2010), Benji Wang in K.O.3an Guo (2010), and Lin Gengxin in God of War, Zhao Yun (2016).

=== Video games ===
Zhao Yun is one of the Five Tiger Generals that must be recruited by the player in the NES RPG Destiny of an Emperor.

Zhao Yun appears as a playable character in Koei's Dynasty Warriors and Warriors Orochi video game series. He is usually featured prominently on the cover of each title, and is most often used by the developers in screenshots and other promotional materials for upcoming releases. He also appears in all instalments of Koei's Romance of the Three Kingdoms strategy game series.

The playable champion Xin Zhao in the multiplayer online battle arena game League of Legends is based on Zhao Yun. Zhao Yun also appears as a playable character in Lost Saga, Honor of Kings, Heroes Evolved and Mobile Legends: Bang Bang. He was later renamed to "Zilong" by Moonton, the developer of Mobile Legends: Bang Bang.

In Arena of Valor, the hero Zanis is renamed Zhao Yun in the Vietnamese, Taiwanese, and Japanese versions.

Zhao Yun appears as a Hero in the 2019 grand strategy game Total War: Three Kingdoms.

Zhao Yun appears as a stray Rider-class Servant in the 2023 video game Fate/Samurai Remnant, specifically in their third DLC titled: "Bailong and the Crimson Demon". His Noble Phantasm, "Lone Charge at Changban", is based on his exploits during the Battle of Changban.

== See also ==
- Lists of people of the Three Kingdoms
- Empty Fort Strategy
