= Xiahou Ba =

3rd-century Chinese Cao Wei state general

- 夏侯霸
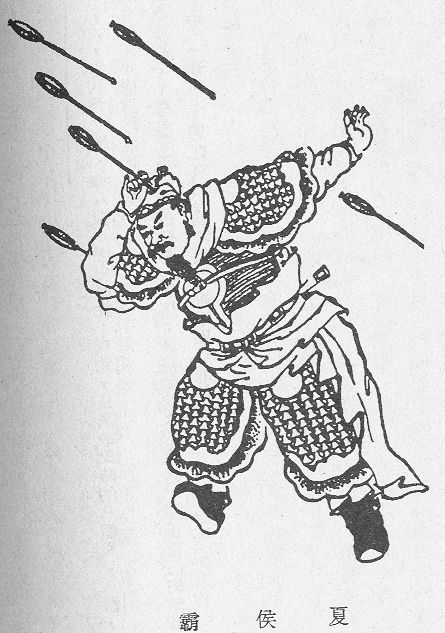
- A Qing dynasty illustration of Xiahou Ba's death

General of Chariots and Cavalry (車騎將軍)
- In office 249 – ?
- Monarch: Liu Shan

General of the Right (右將軍)
- In office c. 240s – 249
- Monarch: Cao Fang

Protector of the Army Who Suppresses Shu (討蜀護軍)
- In office c. 240s – 249
- Monarch: Cao Fang

Personal details
- Born: Unknown
- Died: c. 255–259
- Children: Yang Hu's wife at least two sons
- Parent: Xiahou Yuan (father)
- Relatives: Xiahou Wei (younger brother); Xiahou Hui (younger brother); Xiahou He (younger brother); Lady Xiahou (cousin)
- Occupation: Military general
- Courtesy name: Zhongquan (仲權)
- Posthumous name: lost over time
- Peerage: Marquis of Bochang Village (博昌亭侯)

Xiahou Ba (died c. 255–259), courtesy name Zhongquan, was a Chinese military general of the state of Cao Wei in the Three Kingdoms period of China. He was the second son of Xiahou Yuan, a prominent general who served under Cao Cao, the warlord who laid the foundation for the state of Cao Wei. Around 249, Xiahou Ba defected to Wei's rival state, Shu Han, after the regent Sima Yi seized power in a coup d'état. He died sometime between 255 and 259.

== Service under Cao Wei ==
=== Early career ===
Xiahou Ba's parents were important figures in Cao Wei; his father, Xiahou Yuan, had fought alongside his distant cousin and founder of Wei, Cao Cao, since the start of the civil war, and was one of the most trusted of Cao's generals, while Xiahou Ba's mother was a sister-in-law of Cao Cao. After Xiahou Yuan was killed at Battle of Mount Dingjun in 219 at the hands of Shu general, Huang Zhong, most of his troops were placed under the command of Zhang He upon advice from Guo Huai, while his private militia and guards were succeeded by his five sons. Xiahou Ba displayed great hatred for Shu, and vowed revenge for his father. In 220, Xiahou Yuan's eldest son Xiahou Heng was given his own marquisate and marquis title, so Xiahou Ba inherited his father's marquis title with a stipend of tax revenues from 800 taxable households.

=== Mid career ===
In 230, when the Wei general Cao Zhen proposed a shift from defensive to offensive stance against Shu Han, Lieutenant-General (偏將軍) Xiahou Ba was named as the vanguard. He then led a force towards Hanzhong Commandery taking a route through the 330 km Ziwu Trail (子午道), and camped in a crooked gorge, near the Xingshi camp set up earlier by Shu general, Wei Yan. There, Xiahou Ba was identified by the local residents, who reported his presence to the Shu forces, and was under heavy attack. As the main army of Cao Zhen had not caught up with the vanguard, Xiahou Ba was thrown into a grave situation, where he was forced to rely on personal skills to fight his enemies between barricades until Cao Zhen arrived.

The two forces reached a stalemate and the standoff lasted for a few months, but the developments favoured the Shu side as continuous rainfall over a month had rendered narrow valleys impassable, resulting in Wei army's logistical difficulty. In addition to the disadvantageous weather, Wei Yan had penetrated to the Wei army's rear and successfully incited some non-Han tribes to oppose the Wei forces, so Cao Zhen and Xiahou Ba begrudgingly decided to retreat. Since then, Xiahou Ba was appointed General of the Right, and stationed in Longxi Commandery to train troops; he personally cared for his soldiers and established friendly relation with the foreign tribes (Xirong people) of the region hence he acquired their admiration.

=== As a trusted aide of Cao Shuang ===
In the 240s, Xiahou Ba was enfeoffed as the Marquis of Bochang Village and became a close associate of Cao Shuang, Cao Zhen's son and a regent to the Wei emperor Cao Fang. When Cao Shuang decided to wage war against Shu to enhance his personal influence and reputation, Xiahou Ba was made Protector of the Army and came under command of Xiahou Xuan, who was the marquis's son in the clan. For the ensuing campaign, however, the Wei general Guo Huai, whom Xiahou Ba disliked, had the honour of leading the vanguard. This time, Wei forces chose the shorter Tangluo Trail into Shu territory, but again experienced logistic problems as a long section of the trail had no water source. As a result, the Wei forces had no choice but to retreat, and many soldiers merely died of thirst along the way back. After the war, Guo Huai, due to his timely withdrawal of troops, was granted a higher military authority over Xiahou Ba.

From 244 to 249, Xiahou Ba played into the hands of Guo Huai, who wielded power to temporarily command him when a military crisis arose. In 247, when some tribal leaders rebelled against Wei, Xiahou Ba came under attack by the Shu general Jiang Wei, who came to support the tribes. Together with Guo Huai, Xiahou Ba repelled Jiang Wei's attack and struck back at the rebels, forcing many of them to surrender. However, E Zhesai (蛾遮塞) of the Qiang tribes and Zhi Wudai (治無戴) of the Hu tribes still persevered, so the war was fragmented into battles that dragged on to 248, wherein Jiang Wei again led Shu forces to the aid of the rebels.

At this point, it is clear that Guo Huai, instead of Xiahou Xuan, was the actual commander on the field to give out orders. For instance, when Guo Huai decided to attack Jiang Wei's subordinate, Liao Hua, Xiahou Ba was ordered directly by the decision maker to tail Jiang Wei's main troop to the west. Upon knowing Liao Hua was under attack, Jiang Wei harshly returned to his aide's assistance just as Guo Huai predicted, isolating the rebels from Shu reinforcement. As the Shu commander was worn out from the travel, so was Xiahou Ba, but the glory and merit of subjugating the rebellion went to Guo Huai, who was promoted to a district marquis for his achievements. On the contrary, Xiahou Ba virtually received nothing for his effort in the campaign.

== Service under Shu ==
=== Defection from Wei to Shu ===
In 249, after a coup d'état by Sima Yi against Cao Shuang, a lot of the latter's affiliates were also put to death; being a close friend and associate of Cao Shuang, Xiahou Ba was sensitive to the political developments and grew suspicious of Sima Yi's faction. Soon, Xiahou Xuan, who had the staff of authority to command troops over Liang and Yong provinces, was ordered to the capital under the guise of a promotion. Fraught with dread, Xiahou Ba discussed the issue with Xiahou Xuan, and persuaded the latter to flee with him to Shu. But Xiahou Xuan refused and said "I won't live as a guest in a kingdom of barbarians!" What further perturbed Xiahou Ba was the person who succeeded Xiahou Xuan's former position was none other than Guo Huai, whom Xiahou Ba had a personal feud with. Therefore, Xiahou Ba embarked on his lone journey into Shu.

On his way to Shu, Xiahou Ba lost his way and went into a dead end in a valley, where he ran out of food and resorted to killing his horse, taking the carcass as a last supper. He kept walking until his legs were crippled, then he laid beneath a shadow projected from a large rock, and asked travellers for direction, but still could not figure out how to get out from the dead end. When the locals reported the presence of a lame beggar who looked like the great general Xiahou Ba who attacked them years ago, the Shu emperor, Liu Shan, hurriedly sent a rescue team to escort his uncle-in-law to the Shu capital, Chengdu.

Years ago, Xiahou Ba's cousin, Lady Xiahou, was abducted by the Shu general Zhang Fei and became his wife. As a consequence, the Liu clan and Xiahou clan were linked together though Liu Shan's marriage with Zhang Fei's daughter. (Note: It is not recorded which of the daughters (the elder or the younger) of Zhang Fei was the mother of the boy that Liu Shan commented was related to Xiahou Ba.) That was why Liu Shan called his son a grandnephew of the Xiahou family. Whether it was for political reasons or a private family issue, Liu Shan appointed the handicapped Xiahou Ba as General of Chariots and Cavalry in Shu.

=== Later life in Shu ===
Nevertheless, Jiang Wei apparently befriended Xiahou Ba, and the duo went on several campaigns against the state of Wei. The Wei imperial court pardoned Xiahou Ba's sons on account of Xiahou Yuan's role in the founding of Wei. Instead, they were exiled to Lelang Commandery in present-day North Korea.

At the time Xiahou Ba was already a sexagenarian, if not a septuagenarian; he was still active in social life. A story about that was recorded in Yi Bu Qijiu Zhuan (益部耆舊傳), where an eager Xiahou Ba once wanted to befriend Zhang Ni, who was famous for subjugating the southern barbarians and was one of the most celebrated Shu generals back then. When Xiahou Ba first met Zhang Ni, he told him, "Although I'm not close to you, I have already entrusted wholly to you for a long time, I hope you would understand this." Zhang Ni responded, "I don't know you, and you don't know me. The rationale is on the other end; how can you say you rely on me? I hope you save your words and continue this talk three years later." This incident was circulated within Shu, and knowledgeable persons and scholars found this anecdote worthy of Xiahou Ba's and Zhang Ni's character.

As a newcomer from Wei, Xiahou Ba must have had faced discrimination and distrust from his colleagues, but due to his complicated background, he was trusted by Liu Shan, and highly valued by another defector of Wei, Jiang Wei. Once, Jiang Wei asked Xiahou Ba if Sima Yi, who gained control of Wei court, would attack Shu, Xiahou Ba replied, "they just recently established hegemony, so they will not indulge in foreign affairs. However, there is a young Zhong Hui, who will be a threat to both Wu and Shu." Believing Xiahou Ba's views that Sima Yi would not handle border issues for some time, Jiang Wei revived Zhuge Liang's strategy on constantly waging wars against Wei, and brought Xiahou Ba with him on his expeditions. Xiahou Ba distinguished himself in Jiang Wei's greatest victory in his campaigns, which was the Battle of Didao, after that battle, Xiahou Ba was not mentioned again in historic records.

== Date of death and birth ==
According to Records of Three Kingdoms, Xiahou Ba succeeded Deng Zhi as the General of Chariots and Cavalry after Deng's death in 251. Zizhi Tongjian noted that Xiahou Ba was alive in 255, and Records of Three Kingdoms noted that Xiahou Ba was not alive in 259, when Liao Hua and Zhang Yi were recorded to have succeeded his position as Right General of Chariots and Cavalry and Left General of Chariots and Cavalry respectively. Thus, Xiahou Ba must have had died between 255 and 259. His birth date isn't recorded as well. However, the Weilüe indicated that a younger cousin of Xiahou Ba was captured by Zhang Fei while she was gathering firewood at the age of 12-13 in the year 200, which meant that Xiahou Ba must have been born before 187-188.

== In Romance of the Three Kingdoms ==
In the 14th-century historical novel Romance of the Three Kingdoms, Xiahou Ba's death was altered. When the invasion of Shu occurred in 262, Xiahou Ba defended Shu. At the Battle of Taoyang, he was killed by the arrows and stones that were thrown by the Wei forces laying in wait on the cliffs.

== In popular culture ==
Xiahou Ba is first introduced as a playable character in the seventh installment of Koei's Dynasty Warriors video game series.

== See also ==
- Lists of people of the Three Kingdoms
- Shu Roads
