= Huang Zhong =

Chinese general serving warlord Liu Bei (died 220)

- 黃忠
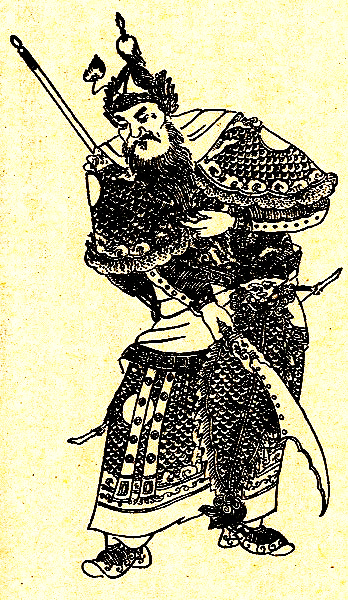
- A Qing dynasty illustration of Huang Zhong

General of the Rear (後將軍)
- In office 219 – 220
- Monarch: Liu Bei

General Who Attacks the West (征西將軍) (under Liu Bei)
- In office 218 – 219
- Monarch: Emperor Xian of Han

General Who Attacks Barbarians (討虜將軍) (under Liu Bei)
- In office 214 – 218
- Monarch: Emperor Xian of Han

Major-General (裨將軍)
- In office 208 – 214
- Monarch: Emperor Xian of Han
- Chancellor: Cao Cao

General of the Household (中郎將) (under Liu Biao)
- In office ? – 208
- Monarch: Emperor Xian of Han

Personal details
- Born: Unknown Nanyang, Henan
- Died: 220
- Children: Huang Xu
- Occupation: Military general
- Courtesy name: Hansheng (漢升) / Hanshu (汉叔)
- Posthumous name: Marquis Gang (剛侯)
- Peerage: Secondary Marquis (關內侯)

Huang Zhong (pinyin: Huáng Zhōng) (died 220), courtesy name Hansheng, (Note: Vol.238 of Taiping Yulan, citing Shu Zhi, recorded his courtesy name as Hanshu (汉叔).) was a Chinese military general serving under the warlord Liu Bei during the late Eastern Han dynasty of China. He is best known for his victory at the Battle of Mount Dingjun in 219, in which his force routed that of an enemy general, Xiahou Yuan, who was killed in action during the raid.

Huang Zhong is portrayed in the 14th-century historical novel Romance of the Three Kingdoms and popular culture as an elderly general with youthful vigour and constitution, and as one of the Five Tiger Generals under Liu Bei.

== Early life ==
Huang Zhong was from Nanyang Commandery, which is around present-day Nanyang, Henan. He initially served as a General of the Household (中郎將) under Liu Biao, the Governor of Jing Province. He was tasked to defend Changsha Commandery with Liu Biao's nephew, Liu Pan. Liu Biao died in 208 and his successor, Liu Cong, surrendered Jing Province to the warlord Cao Cao. Huang Zhong was appointed as an acting Major-General (裨將軍) and he continued serving in Changsha under Han Xuan, the commandery administrator.

== Service under Liu Bei ==
Following Cao Cao's defeat at the Battle of Red Cliffs in the same year, the victorious allied forces of Liu Bei and Sun Quan gradually took over the various commanderies in southern Jing Province, including Changsha. Han Xuan surrendered Changsha, and Huang Zhong came to serve under Liu Bei. Since receiving a military appointment at Jiameng (葭萌; present-day Zhaohua District, Guangyuan, Sichuan), Huang Zhong had performed well in Liu Bei's conquest of Yi Province (covering present-day Sichuan and Chongqing) from 212 to 214, – he was always the first to charge into enemy formations and among the army; none could match his martial prowess and bravery. After Yi Province was taken, Huang Zhong was promoted to General Who Attacks Rebels (討虜將軍).

=== Success in the Hanzhong Campaign ===
In 217, Liu Bei started a campaign to seize control of Hanzhong Commandery, which was under Cao Cao's control. His force encountered resistance led by Xiahou Yuan at Yangping Pass. The confrontation dragged on for more than a year until one night in 219, when Liu Bei set fire to the barbed fence around Xiahou Yuan's camp at the foot of Mount Dingjun. Alarmed by the attack, Xiahou Yuan sent Zhang He to defend the eastern corner of the camp while he guarded the south. Liu Bei's main force pressed against Zhang He, outmatching the latter. Xiahou Yuan dispatched a fraction of his own troops to help Zhang He. Even though Xiahou Yuan's soldiers were far more experienced, Huang Zhong still rallied his men and accompanied by thundering drums with impressive shouts, they descended upon Xiahou Yuan's force. The battle became a rout and Xiahou Yuan was killed in action. The victory at Mount Dingjun was a major stepping stone to the conquest of Hanzhong. Huang Zhong was promoted to General Who Attacks the West (征西將軍) for his contributions in the Hanzhong Campaign.

In the same year, Liu Bei proclaimed himself "King of Hanzhong" (漢中王) – a symbolic move comparing himself to Emperor Gao, the founding emperor of the Han dynasty. He wanted to appoint Huang Zhong as General of the Rear (後將軍), placing the latter on the same level as three other senior generals: Guan Yu, Zhang Fei and Ma Chao. However, Zhuge Liang told Liu Bei: "Huang Zhong's fame is far from that of Guan Yu and Ma Chao. If they are all given equal status, Zhang Fei and Ma Chao will probably not object because they have been with Huang Zhong all this while and have witnessed his contributions, but Guan Yu is stationed far away and he may not agree with this arrangement." Liu Bei answered: "I will handle this myself." and tasked Fei Shi with travelling to Jing Province to inform Guan Yu about his appointment. Then, he elevated all the four generals to the same status. Huang Zhong also received the title of a Secondary Marquis (關內侯).

== Death ==
Huang Zhong died in 220 and his cause of death was not specified. In October or November 260, Liu Shan awarded Huang Zhong the posthumous title "Marquis Gang" (剛侯), which literally means "unyielding marquis". Huang Zhong's son, Huang Xu (黃叙), had already died at a young age before him and did not have any descendants.

Huang Zhong's tomb was first discovered in Chengdu during the Qing dynasty in 1825. The tomb was repaired and a temple dedicated to him was built next to it. The temple, the statue, the plaques, and the tomb were heavily damaged with its coffin emptied during the Cultural Revolution.

== Appraisal ==
Chen Shou, who wrote Huang Zhong's biography in the Sanguozhi, commented on the latter as follows: "Huang Zhong and Zhao Yun were fierce and mighty warriors, just like claws and teeth. Were they the successors to Guan and Teng?"

== In Romance of the Three Kingdoms ==
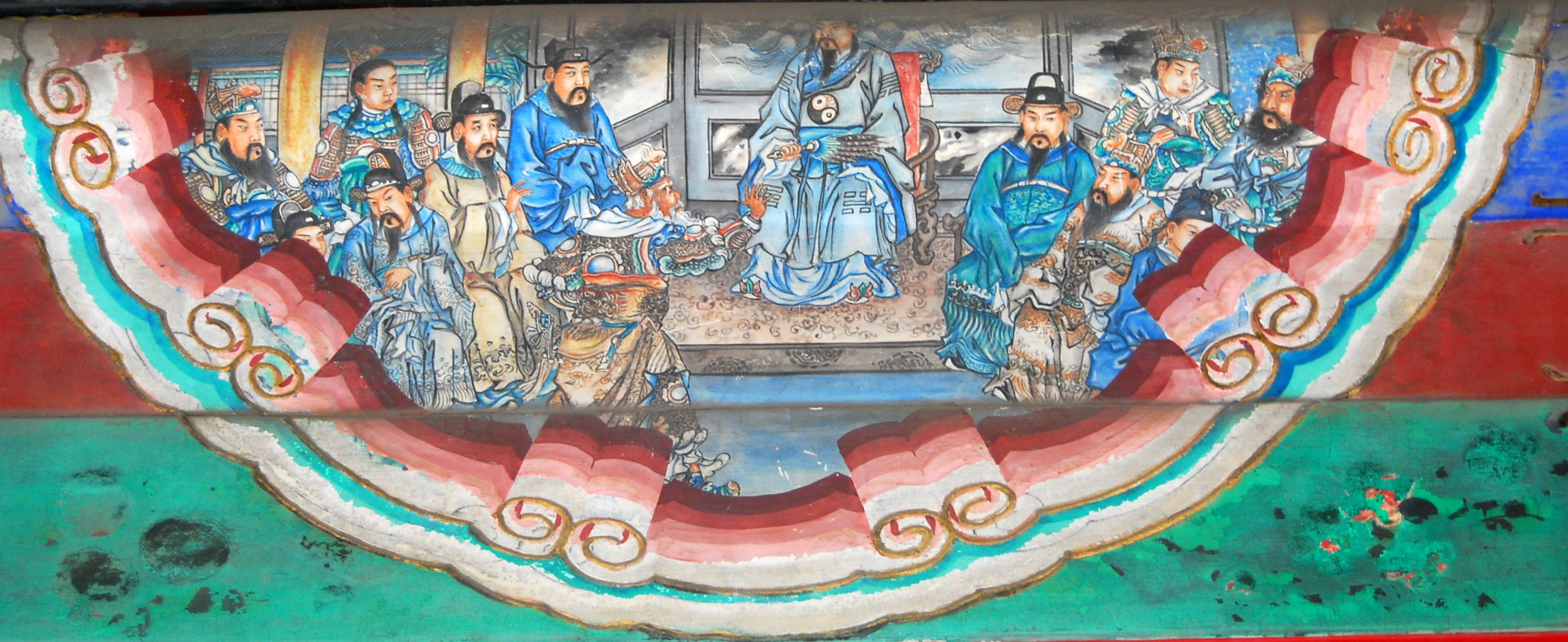
The portrait "Huang Zhong requests to go into battle" (黃忠請戰) at the Long Corridor of the Summer Palace, Beijing. The picture depicts a scene from the novel Romance of the Three Kingdoms in which an elderly Huang Zhong urged Liu Bei to send him to fight Xiahou Yuan despite concerns over his age.

Huang Zhong is featured as a prominent character in the historical novel Romance of the Three Kingdoms by Luo Guanzhong, which romanticises the historical events before and during the Three Kingdoms period. In the novel, Huang Zhong was named one of the Five Tiger Generals by Liu Bei after Liu emerged victorious in the Hanzhong Campaign in 219. In the novel, Huang Zhong is portrayed as an elderly warrior highly skilled in archery.

See the following for some fictitious stories in Romance of the Three Kingdoms involving Huang Zhong:

- Battle of Mount Dingjun#In fiction
- Battle of Xiaoting#Huang Zhong's death

== In popular culture ==
Huang Zhong is featured as a playable character in the video game series Dynasty Warriors, Kessen II, and Warriors Orochi produced by Koei, as well as in the Capcom game Destiny of an Emperor released for the original Nintendo Entertainment System.

Huang Zhong is featured on a card in the Three Kingdoms Portal of the card game Magic: The Gathering.

A Chinese-Canadian youth organization and martial arts club specializing in traditional Chinese cultural arts, the Hon Hsing Athletic Club of Vancouver (雲高華漢升體育會), British Columbia, was established in 1939 under the patronage of the Wongs' Benevolent Association of Canada. It is named after Huang Zhong's courtesy name, Hansheng (漢升; Cantonese: Hon Hsing).

Huang Zhong is a potential skin for the character Hanzo Shimada in the video game Overwatch. It was released in 2019 as part of the Chinese New Year event "Year of the Pig".

USS Huang Zhong is the name of an Archer-class scoutship which appears in the Star Trek novel That Which Divides, by Dayton Ward.

Huang Zhong appears in Total War: Three Kingdoms as a playable character, serving under Liu Biao's faction.

== See also ==
- Lists of people of the Three Kingdoms
