= Lady Xiahou =

Chinese noblewoman during the Three Kingdoms period

Lady Xiahou 夏侯氏
- Born: 180s
- Died: after 219
- Spouse: Zhang Fei
- Issue: Lady Zhang (Note: It is not recorded which of the daughters (the elder or the younger) of Zhang Fei was the mother of the boy that Liu Shan commented was related to Xiahou Ba.)
- Clan: Xiahou (夏侯)

Lady Xiahou (夏侯氏; 180s – after 219) or Consort Xiahou (夏侯姫) was a Chinese noblewoman of the Xiahou clan of the Cao Wei state during the Three Kingdoms period. She was the niece of Xiahou Yuan, a famous general of the warlord Cao Cao. She married Zhang Fei, a general of the Liu Bei, founder of Shu Han. She had one daughter who became empress of the Shu state.

== Life ==
In 200, Xiahou was thirteen or fourteen years old by East Asian age reckoning, and was captured by Zhang Fei when she went out to collect firewood in the local area of Qiao County (譙郡). Zhang Fei discovered that she was a woman from a good family and married her.

Her origins and the exact circumstances of her abduction and marriage, including her feelings on the matter, are not clearly known. She was from the Xiahou clan which was one of the main maintainers of the state of Cao Wei which was a rival of what would become the state of Shu Han that Zhang Fei would serve. There are anecdotes that say that Xiahou Yuan abandoned his son for a year to save his late brother's daughter; it is unknown if that person would be Lady Xiahou.

Lady Xiahou bore one daughter who became empress of the state of Shu Han.

In 219, Xiahou Yuan was killed in battle between Cao Cao and Liu Bei during the Battle of Hanzhong. When Lady Xiahou learned of this, she requested them to take his remains and bury him with dignity.

In 249, after the Incident at the Gaoping Tombs took place in Cao Wei, Xiahou Ba, cousin of Lady Xiahou and son of Xiahou Yuan, defected to Shu Han. Xiahou Ba was displeased with Cao Wei's status when Sima Yi had Cao Shuang killed and exiled many Cao family loyalists, including members of the Xiahou clan. Xiahou Ba went to Chengdu asking Emperor Liu Shan to serve the state of Shu. He was given special treatment and accepted due to being Lady Xiahou's cousin and Empress Zhang's uncle.
