= Xiahou Hui =

3rd century Cao Wei official

- 夏侯恵

Administrator of Le'an (樂安太守)
- In office ?–?
- Monarch: ?

Chancellor of Yan (燕相)
- In office ?–?
- Monarch: ?

Personal details
- Born: between 207 and 219
- Died: between 243 and 255
- Parent: Xiahou Yuan (father)
- Occupation: Official
- Courtesy name: Zhiquan (稚權)

Xiahou Hui (fl. 220–243), courtesy name Zhiquan, was an official of the state of Cao Wei during the Three Kingdoms period of China.

== Life ==
Xiahou Hui was the sixth son of Xiahou Yuan, a general who served under Cao Cao, the warlord who laid the foundation for the Cao Wei state in the late Eastern Han dynasty before the Three Kingdoms period. As a youth, he was already known for being knowledgeable, well-read and talented in literary arts. He served in various positions in the Cao Wei government, including Gentleman of the Yellow Gate (黃門侍郎), Chancellor (相) of Yan State (燕國), and Administrator (太守) of Le'an Commandery (樂安郡). He also had several debates with Zhong Yu (锺毓), a son of Zhong Yao. He died at the age of 36.

== See also ==
- Lists of people of the Three Kingdoms
