= Xiahou Wei =

3rd-century Chinese official of the state of Cao Wei

- 夏侯威

Inspector of Yan Province (兗州刺史)
- In office ?–?
- Monarch: ?

Inspector of Jing Province (荊州刺史)
- In office ?–?
- Monarch: ?

Personal details
- Born: Unknown
- Died: Unknown
- Children: Xiahou Jun; Xiahou Zhuang
- Parents: Xiahou Yuan (father); Lady Ding? (mother)
- Occupation: Military general and politician
- Courtesy name: Jiquan (季權)

Xiahou Wei (fl.first half of 3rd century), courtesy name Jiquan, was a Chinese military general and politician of the state of Cao Wei during the Three Kingdoms period of China. He was the fourth son of Xiahou Yuan and a maternal great-grandfather of Emperor Yuan of the Eastern Jin dynasty, being the grandfather of Emperor Yuan's mother Xiahou Guangji.

== Life ==
Xiahou Wei was the fourth son of Xiahou Yuan, a general who served under Cao Cao, the warlord who laid the foundation for the Cao Wei state in the late Eastern Han dynasty before the Three Kingdoms period. His mother, whose maiden family name could be Ding (丁), was a younger sister of one of Cao Cao's wives/concubines. Xiahou Wei was close friends with Cao Cao's sons, including Cao Pi and Cao Zhi. He also knew Yang Hu since young and felt that he was an extraordinary talent, so he advised his second brother Xiahou Ba to arrange a marriage between Yang Hu and Xiahou Ba's daughter. Yang Hu later became a famous general in the late Three Kingdoms period and the Jin dynasty (266–420).

Xiahou Wei once met the fortune teller Zhu Jianping (朱建平), who told him, "You'll become a provincial governor by the age of 49, but you'll also encounter a major calamity. If you survive the calamity, you'll live up to 70 and will even become a ducal minister." Xiahou Wei consecutively served as the Inspector (刺史) of Jing and Yan provinces under the Cao Wei state before his 49th birthday. However, just as Zhu Jianping foretold, Xiahou Wei became critically ill by the end of the year. He thought that he would not survive, so he instructed his family to prepare for his funeral. To his surprise, he recovered from his illness towards the end of the 12th lunar month, so he threw a banquet on the eve of the Lunar New Year to celebrate. He told his guests, "I have recovered from my illness. When the sun rises tomorrow, I'll be 50 years old. I have survived the calamity that Zhu Jianping warned me about." After the banquet, he suddenly suffered a relapse and died of illness that night. According to his grandson Xiahou Zhan, Xiahou Wei was posthumously made a marquis with the posthumous name "Mu" (穆).

== Family ==
Xiahou Wei had at least two sons. His first son, Xiahou Jun (夏侯駿; fl.240-299), courtesy name Zhangrong (长容), served as the Inspector (刺史) of Bing Province; Jun also married a daughter of Sima Liang. During Qi Wannian's rebellion, Xiahou Jun worked together with Sima Rong, Prince of Liang, to undermine Zhou Chu; Zhou was later killed in battle.

Xiahou Wei's second son, Xiahou Zhuang (夏侯莊), courtesy name Zhongrong (仲容), married Lady Yang (a daughter of Xin Xianying and cousin of Yang Huiyu) and served as the Administrator (太守) of Huainan Commandery (淮南郡). He was also enfeoffed as Marquis of Qingming Village (清明亭侯).

Xiahou Zhuang had at least two sons and one daughter. His first son, Xiahou Zhan (夏侯湛; 243 - 23 June 291), served as a Regular Mounted Attendant (散騎常侍) and as the Chancellor (相) of Nanyang State (南陽國). His second son, Xiahou Chun (夏侯淳), served as the Administrator of Yiyang Commandery (弋陽郡). Xiahou Chun's son, Xiahou Cheng (夏侯承), served as a Regular Mounted Attendant under the Eastern Jin dynasty. During the final years of Emperor Yuan's reign, Xiahou Cheng was Administrator of Nanping. He then joined an alliance of officials headed by Gan Zhuo against the powerful official and warlord Wang Dun. However, due to Gan's hesitation, the alliance was defeated and Xiahou Cheng was captured. Wang Dun wanted to execute Xiahou Cheng, but Xiahou Cheng's maternal cousin Wang Hao (王暠, also known as Wang Yi (王廙), and also Wang Dun's cousin) interceded on Cheng's behalf and Cheng was spared; Cheng was then made a Regular Mounted Attendant.

Xiahou Zhuang's daughter, Xiahou Guangji (夏侯光姬; died between August 307 and February 308), married the Western Jin dynasty prince Sima Jin (司馬覲; son of Sima Zhou) and gave birth to Sima Rui, the first emperor of the Eastern Jin dynasty.

Xiahou Zhuang may have another daughter, who was the mother of Wang Yi (王廙; 276 - 4 November 322), who was an uncle of Wang Xizhi.

== See also ==
- Lists of people of the Three Kingdoms
