= Mount Dingjun =

Mountain in Shaanxi, China

Coordinates: 33°06′54″N 106°39′41″E

- Dingjun Shan

Highest point
- Elevation: 833 m (2,733 ft)

Naming
- Native name: 定军山 (Chinese)

Geography
- Location: Mian County, Hanzhong, Shaanxi, China
- Country: China
- State: Shaanxi
- Region: Hanzhong
- District: Mian County

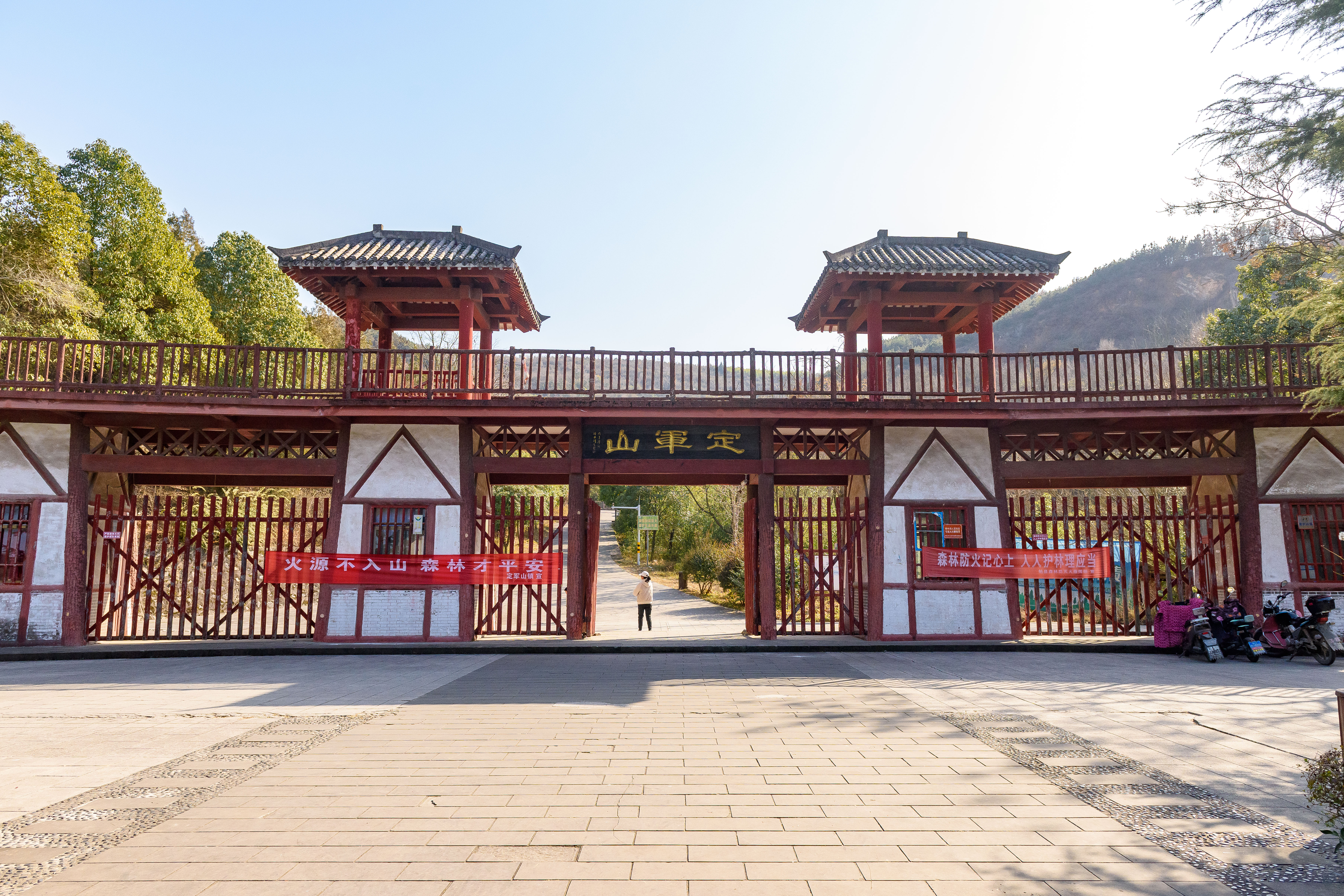
Entrance of Dingjunshan Scenic Area

Mount Dingjun (Chinese: 定军山; pinyin: Dìngjūn Shān) is a mountain in the Mian County of Hanzhong, Shaanxi, China. It is situated across Tiandang Mountain, separated by the Han River, and is near the old Yangping Pass.

== History ==
The mountain is famous for the battle which took place there in the Three Kingdoms period, when Huang Zhong of Shu defeated and killed Xiahou Yuan of Wei. According to Sanguo Zhi, Shu prime minister Zhuge Liang wished to be buried on Mount Dingjun, so the tomb was built for him there.

== In popular culture ==
The Battle of Mount Dingjun is dramatised in the historical novel Romance of the Three Kingdoms. Later in the novel, the general Zhong Hui marches through Mount Dingjun, where he is visited by the spirit of Zhuge Liang.
