= Xiahou He =

3rd-century Chinese Cao Wei and Western Jin official

- 夏侯和

Minister of the Household (光祿勳)
- In office early 270s – ?
- Monarch: Emperor Wu of Jin

Minister of Ceremonies (太常)
- In office ?–?
- Monarch: ?

Intendant of Henan (河南尹)
- In office 272? – before 274
- Monarch: Emperor Wu of Jin

Personal details
- Born: between 207 and 219
- Died: Unknown
- Parent: Xiahou Yuan (father)
- Occupation: Military general, politician
- Courtesy name: Yiquan (義權)

Xiahou He (fl.220 - 274), courtesy name Yiquan, was a Chinese military general and politician of the state of Cao Wei during the Three Kingdoms period of China.

== Life ==
Xiahou He was the seventh son of Xiahou Yuan, a general who served under Cao Cao, the warlord who laid the foundation for the Cao Wei state in the late Eastern Han dynasty before the Three Kingdoms period. He served in various positions in the Cao Wei government, including Intendant of Henan (河南尹) and Minister of Ceremonies (太常). He also served as a Left Major (左司馬) and an Attendant (侍郎) under Sima Zhao, the Wei regent.

In March 264, the Wei general Zhong Hui started a rebellion in the former territories of Wei's rival state Shu Han after helping Wei conquer them in the previous year. At the time, Xiahou He had been appointed by the Wei government as an emissary to visit Zhong Hui in Chengdu, the former capital of Shu, so he used his imperial authority to command the Wei military forces to aid in the suppression of Zhong Hui's rebellion. He was later enfeoffed as a district marquis (鄉侯) for his contributions.

Xiahou He continued serving under the Jin dynasty (266–420), which replaced the Cao Wei state, and held the position of Minister of the Household (光祿勳) in the Jin government during the reign of Emperor Wu of Jin.

Between August 272 and 274, while Xiahou He was still Intendant of Henan, Emperor Wu fell gravely ill, and the Jin court considered making Emperor Wu's younger brother Sima You the next emperor, rather than Emperor Wu's son and crown prince Sima Zhong. Xiahou told Jia Chong, "Your relations with both sons-in-law are equal. An heir should be chosen based on his virtues." Jia did not comment on the statement; after Emperor Wu heard about the incident, he moved Xiahou to the post of Minister of the Household, and deprived Jia of his military powers, while allowing Jia to retain his titles and treatment in court.

== See also ==
- Lists of people of the Three Kingdoms
