= Xiahou Yuan =

Chinese military general (died 219)

- 夏侯淵
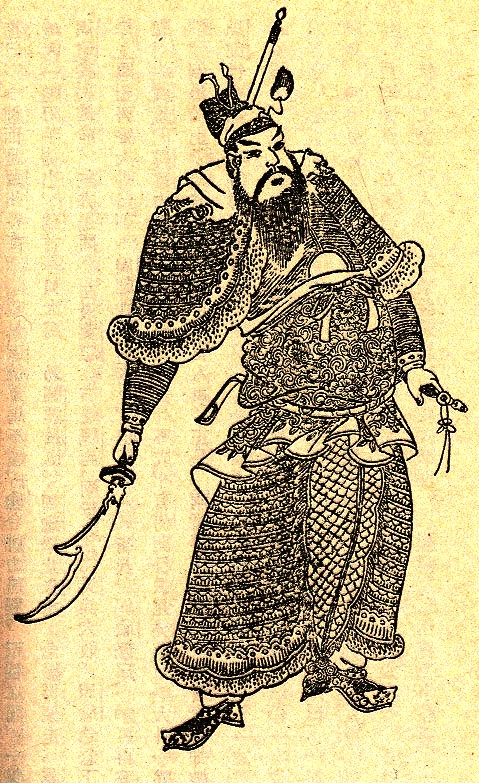
- A Qing dynasty illustration of Xiahou Yuan

General Who Attacks the West (征西將軍)
- In office 216 – 219
- Monarch: Emperor Xian of Han
- Chancellor: Cao Cao

Protector-General (都護將軍) (acting)
- In office 215 – 216
- Monarch: Emperor Xian of Han
- Chancellor: Cao Cao

General Who Protects the Army (護軍將軍) (acting)
- In office ? – 215
- Monarch: Emperor Xian of Han
- Chancellor: Cao Cao

Personal details
- Born: Unknown Bozhou, Anhui
- Died: c.February 219 Mount Dingjun, Shaanxi
- Children: Xiahou Heng; Xiahou Ba; Xiahou Cheng; Xiahou Wei; Xiahou Rong; Xiahou Hui; Xiahou He
- Relatives: Xiahou Dun (cousin); Lady Xiahou (niece)
- Occupation: Military general, politician
- Courtesy name: Miaocai (妙才)
- Posthumous name: Marquis Min (愍侯)
- Peerage: Marquis of Bochang Village (博昌亭侯)

Xiahou Yuan (died c.February 219), courtesy name Miaocai, was a Chinese military general and politician serving under the warlord Cao Cao in the late Eastern Han dynasty of China. He is known for his exploits in western China (in parts of present-day Gansu, Ningxia and Shaanxi provinces) in the 210s, during which he defeated Cao Cao's rivals Ma Chao and Han Sui in Liang Province and the surrounding areas, and forced several Di and Qiang tribal peoples into submission. He was killed in action at the Battle of Mount Dingjun while defending Hanzhong Commandery from attacks by a rival warlord Liu Bei. Xiahou Yuan's death was highly dramatised in the 14th-century historical novel Romance of the Three Kingdoms, in which he was slain by Liu Bei's general Huang Zhong during a surprise raid.

== Early life and career ==
Xiahou Yuan was from Qiao County (譙縣), Pei State (沛國), which is in present-day Bozhou, Anhui. He was a younger cousin of Xiahou Dun and a descendant of Xiahou Ying, who served under the Han dynasty's founding emperor, Liu Bang (Emperor Gao). He once helped Cao Cao shoulder the blame when Cao committed a serious offence. Cao Cao later saved him. When a famine broke out in Yan and Yu provinces, Xiahou Yuan and his family were adversely affected. He decided to sacrifice his youngest son in favour of his deceased younger brother's orphaned daughter.

In 190, when Cao Cao was raising an army to join the campaign against Dong Zhuo, Xiahou Yuan joined Cao and served as a Major of Separate Command (別部司馬) and Cavalry Commandant (騎都尉) under Cao. He was subsequently appointed as the Administrator (太守) of Chenliu (陳留; around present-day Kaifeng, Henan) and Yingchuan (潁川; in present-day central Henan) commanderies.

== Mid career ==
In 200, when Cao Cao clashed with his rival Yuan Shao at the Battle of Guandu, Xiahou Yuan was appointed acting Colonel Who Inspects the Army (督軍校尉). After Cao Cao's victory over Yuan Shao, Xiahou Yuan was put in charge of overseeing the transport of provisions from Yan, Yu and Xu provinces to Cao Cao's armies at the frontline in northern China. Cao Cao's forces were lacking food supplies at that time, but Xiahou Yuan was able to deliver the supplies in time and this helped to boost the army's morale.

In 206, Chang Xi (昌狶) started a rebellion, so Cao Cao sent Yu Jin to lead an army to suppress the revolt. Yu Jin was unsuccessful, so Cao Cao ordered Xiahou Yuan to join Yu Jin in a second expedition against Chang Xi. They defeated the rebels this time and captured over 10 enemy garrisons while Chang Xi surrendered to Yu Jin. Xiahou Yuan was appointed Colonel Who Arranges the Army (典軍校尉) after his success. Xiahou Yuan was known for the swift movements of his units in battle, and he often took his enemies by surprise. There was a saying in Cao Cao's army to describe this: "Xiahou Yuan, the Colonel Who Arranges the Army, travels 500 li in three days and 1,000 li in six days."

In 207, Yellow Turban rebels in Jinan (濟南; near present-day Zhangqiu, Shandong) and Le'an (樂安; in present-day Shandong), led by Xu He (徐和) and Sima Ju (司馬俱), attacked cities and killed officials. Xiahou Yuan led military forces from Taishan (泰山; near Mount Tai), Qi and Pingyuan commanderies to attack the rebels. He defeated them, killed Xu He, and pacified the various counties in the region. He also collected the enemy's food supplies and distributed them among his own troops.

In 209, after Cao Cao returned from his defeat at the Battle of Red Cliffs against the allied forces of Sun Quan and Liu Bei, he ordered Xiahou Yuan to lead an assault on Lei Xu, who had started a revolt in Lujiang Commandery (廬江郡; in present-day Hefei, Anhui). After defeating Lei Xu, Xiahou Yuan was appointed acting Protector-General Who Attacks the West (征西護軍) and ordered to lead troops together with Xu Huang to attack rebels in Taiyuan Commandery (太原郡; in present-day Shanxi). They conquered over 20 enemy camps, killed the rebel chief Shang Yao (商曜), and massacred the population in the rebel base.

== Campaigns in western China ==
In 211, Xiahou Yuan participated in the Battle of Tong Pass on Cao Cao's side against a coalition of western warlords led by Han Sui and Ma Chao, in which Cao emerged victorious against the coalition. He and Zhu Ling later led a separate force to pacify the Di tribes in Yumi (隃糜) and Qian (汧) counties. Following that, he rendezvoused with Cao Cao's main force in Anding Commandery (安定郡; covering parts of present-day Ningxia and Gansu), where they forced Yang Qiu, an ally of Han Sui and Ma Chao, to surrender.

In 212, Cao Cao returned to Ye (in present-day Handan, Hebei), leaving behind Xiahou Yuan, Zhu Ling and Lu Zhao (路招) to garrison in Chang'an. Xiahou Yuan held the appointment of acting General Who Protects the Army (護軍將軍) at the time. He defeated a group of bandits led by Liu Xiong (劉雄) in Nanshan (南山) and forced them to surrender. He also besieged Liang Xing (梁興; an ally of Han Sui and Ma Chao) in Hu County (鄠縣) and defeated and killed Liang Xing. In recognition of his contributions, the Han imperial court enfeoffed him as the Marquis of Bochang Village (博昌亭侯).

In 213, Ma Chao besieged Wei Kang, the Inspector (刺史) of Liang Province, in the provincial capital Ji (兾; or Jicheng, in present-day Gangu County, Gansu). Xiahou Yuan wanted to lead reinforcements to help Wei Kang but arrived too late as Ji had already fallen to Ma Chao while Xiahou Yuan and his army were still more than 200 li away from Ji. Ma Chao led an army out to face Xiahou Yuan. Xiahou Yuan would be unsuccessful against Ma Chao and he decided to withdraw his troops when he heard that the Di tribes in Qian County (汧縣) had started a rebellion.

In 214, Zhao Qu (趙衢), Yin Feng (尹奉) and several others, who were forced to submit to Ma Chao after he seized control of Liang Province, secretly plotted to drive Ma Chao out of the province. Jiang Xu started a revolt in Lu (鹵; or Lucheng, in present-day Li County, Gansu) to lure Ma Chao to attack him, while Zhao Qu and the others pretended to urge Ma Chao to lead his troops to Lu to suppress the revolt. Ma Chao fell for the ruse. Soon after he left Ji, Zhao Qu and the others turned against him and killed his wife and child(ren). At the same time, Ma Chao also failed to recapture Lu from Jiang Xu, so he became stranded.

Ma Chao retreated to Hanzhong Commandery, where he borrowed troops from the warlord Zhang Lu and returned to attack Jiang Xu and his allies at Mount Qi (祁山; the mountainous regions around present-day Li County, Gansu). Jiang Xu sent a messenger to Chang'an to request for reinforcements. Xiahou Yuan and the officers in Chang'an held a meeting on whether to help Jiang Xu and his allies or not. Many of the officers thought that they should wait for orders from Cao Cao before making any move. However, Xiahou Yuan had a different opinion and he said, "Our lord is 4,000 li away in Ye. By the time he receives our report, Jiang Xu and his allies are done for. Therefore, it is imperative that we send reinforcements to them immediately." He appointed Zhang He to lead 5,000 infantry and cavalry as the vanguard and head towards Mount Qi via a narrow pass at Chencang (陳倉; present-day Chencang District, Baoji, Shaanxi), while he supervised the supply train and followed behind with another army. When Zhang He's 5,000-strong army reached the Wei River, Ma Chao initially sent a few thousand Di and Qiang horsemen to resist the enemy, but later called for a retreat before both sides could engage in battle. Zhang He advanced further and seized the military equipment left behind by Ma Chao's forces. When Xiahou Yuan's army arrived, most of the counties in Liang Province had been pacified.

After the victory, Xiahou Yuan prepared for an offensive against Ma Chao's ally Han Sui, who retreated when he heard of Xiahou Yuan's approach. Xiahou Yuan captured Han Sui's food supplies and pursued him to Lueyang County. Han Sui had set up a base some 20 li away from Xiahou Yuan's position, so Xiahou Yuan's subordinates urged their general to attack either Han Sui or the Di tribes in Xingguo (興國; northeast of present-day Qin'an County, Gansu). Xiahou Yuan chose neither of the two options as he knew that Han Sui's troops were well-prepared for battle and that Xingguo's fortifications were strong. Instead, he planned to attack the Qiang tribes in Changli (長離; along the Hulu River, Gansu). He pointed out that many of Han Sui's soldiers were Qiang tribesmen from Changli, so they would return to save their home if they heard that Changli was under attack. If Han Sui's troops decided to hold their current position, they would be isolated; if they came to defend Changli, Xiahou Yuan's forces would be able to engage them in battle. Xiahou Yuan then ordered his subordinates to guard their supplies and heavy equipment while he led a unit of lightly armed infantry and cavalry to raid Changli, burning down many Qiang camps and killing many people. As Xiahou Yuan expected, the Qiang tribesmen in Han Sui's army returned to Changli and encountered Xiahou Yuan's army. Xiahou Yuan's men were fearful when they saw Han Sui's larger army, so they proposed setting up camps and defensive structures before fighting the enemy. However, Xiahou Yuan said, "We've travelled over a long distance. Our troops will be worn out by the time they finish erecting these defensive structures, and won't have energy left to fight the enemy. The enemy may have superiority in numbers but they are easy to deal with." He then launched an attack on Han Sui's forces and scored a major victory over the enemy, capturing their flags and banners. After that, he returned to Lueyang County and laid siege on Xingguo. The Di chieftains in Xingguo fled to join Ma Chao while the others surrendered. Xiahou Yuan also attacked some Chuge encampments at Gaoping (高平; in present-day Guyuan, Ningxia), drove the Chuge away, and captured their supplies and livestock. The Han imperial court authorised him to oversee the affairs in the region.

During the Liang Province Rebellion in the 180s, a rebel chief Song Jian (宋建) declared himself "King of the River Source Who Pacifies Han" (河首平漢王) in Fuhan County (枹罕縣; around present-day Linxia, Gansu). After Xiahou Yuan pacified Liang Province, Cao Cao ordered him to attack Song Jian. Xiahou Yuan besieged Fuhan, conquered the county within months, and captured and executed Song Jian and all his followers. He also sent Zhang He to force the other Qiang tribes in the region to surrender. By 215, most of western China had been pacified and submitted to Cao Cao's control. Cao Cao wrote an order to praise Xiahou Yuan: "Song Jian had been causing trouble for over 30 years. Xiahou Yuan eliminated him in one movement and made an unprecedented achievement. Confucius once said, 'I cannot do as well as you.'"

== Battles around Hanzhong ==
In 216, the Han imperial court awarded Xiahou Yuan with an additional 300 taxable households in his marquisate, bringing the total number to 800. Subsequently, Xiahou Yuan led an attack on the Di and Qiang tribes of Wudu (武都; in present-day Longnan, Gansu) at Xiabian (下辯), capturing over 100,000 hu (斛; a large unit of measurement) of grain. When Cao Cao led his forces to attack the warlord Zhang Lu in Hanzhong Commandery, Xiahou Yuan led all the military officers and nobles in Liang Province to meet Cao Cao at Xiu Village (休亭). The Qiang and tribal chieftains were fearful of Xiahou Yuan whenever they attended meetings with Cao Cao.

Zhang Lu surrendered to Cao Cao after his defeat at the Battle of Yangping. Xiahou Yuan was appointed acting Protector-General (都護將軍) and was ordered to pacify Ba Commandery (巴郡) with the aid of Zhang He and Xu Huang. Cao Cao later returned to Ye (in present-day Handan, Hebei) and left Xiahou Yuan and others behind to defend the newly conquered Hanzhong Commandery. Xiahou Yuan was appointed General Who Attacks the West (征西將軍).

In 217, Cao Cao's rival Liu Bei, who had taken over Yi Province (covering present-day Sichuan and Chongqing) in 215, launched a campaign to wrestle control of Hanzhong from Cao Cao. When Liu Bei's forces reached Yangping Pass (陽平關; in present-day Ningqiang County, Shaanxi), Xiahou Yuan led his men to resist the enemy and both sides were locked in a stalemate for nearly a year.

One night in February or March 219, Liu Bei set fire to the barbed fences around Xiahou Yuan's camp, so Xiahou Yuan sent Zhang He to defend the eastern part of the camp while he personally led a lightly armed force to guard the south. Zhang He attacked Liu Bei when the latter taunted him, but he failed to overcome the enemy. Xiahou Yuan then sent a fraction of his own troops to help Zhang He. Liu Bei's general Huang Zhong launched a fierce assault on Xiahou Yuan even though his men had less battle experience than Xiahou Yuan's troops. Xiahou Yuan was killed in action. (Note: In his Zizhi Tongjian Kaoyi, Sima Guang indicated that for Tongjian, he used the accounts found in Liu Bei's (vol.32), Huang Zhong's (vol.36) and Fa Zheng's (vol.37) biographies in the Sanguozhi when recording Xiahou Yuan's death.)

Xiahou Yuan was granted the posthumous title "Marquis Min" (愍侯), which literally means "sympathetic marquis". (Note: According to the "Rules of assigning posthumous names" chapter in the Yizhoushu, an official would receive the posthumous name "Min" for either one of the following criteria: being killed while serving the country; letting civilians be harmed; being belittled (or sick) for a long time; being involved in a coup d'etat (or rebellion). In Xiahou Yuan's case, he was killed in battle. Another of Cao Cao's generals, Li Dian, also shared the same posthumous name. Quote from Yizhoushu vol. 6. ch. 54: (在國逢難曰愍。使民折傷曰愍。在國連憂曰愍。禍亂方作曰愍。))

Cao Cao once gave the following piece of advice to Xiahou Yuan after he scored a series of victories: "A general should consider his weaknesses, be prepared for situations in which he cannot win, and not rely solely on sheer bravery. Courage is a base instinct he should possess, but he should also use wisdom and strategy when he makes moves. One who knows only bravery is no more than an ordinary man who can fight enemies."

== Family ==
Xiahou Yuan's spouse was a younger sister of one of Cao Cao's wives.

Xiahou Yuan's eldest son, Xiahou Heng (夏侯衡), married a daughter of Cao Cao's younger brother, the Marquis Ai of Haiyang (海陽哀侯). Cao Cao favoured Xiahou Heng, who inherited his father's title "Marquis of Bochang Village" (博昌亭侯). His marquis title was later changed to "Marquis of Anning Village" (安寧亭侯).

Xiahou Yuan's second son, Xiahou Ba, served as a military general in the state of Cao Wei. He defected to Wei's rival state, Shu Han, after the regent Sima Yi seized power from his co-regent Cao Shuang and became the de facto ruler of Wei.

Xiahou Yuan had five other sons who were younger than Xiahou Ba: Xiahou Cheng (夏侯稱), Xiahou Wei, Xiahou Rong (夏侯榮), Xiahou Hui and Xiahou He.

Xiahou Yuan's 5th son, Xiahou Rong (夏侯榮), was with his father during the Battle of Mount Dingjun. When he had heard of his father's death, he was in such a rage he had to be restrained by his attendants. He then managed to break free and charge to the enemy with a sword in hand; he was also killed in action. He was only 13 years old (by East Asian reckoning).

Xiahou Yuan also had a niece, Lady Xiahou, who was around 13 years old in 200 CE. She was out gathering firewood when she was taken by Zhang Fei. She became Zhang Fei's wife and bore him two daughters, who both later married Liu Shan and became Empress Jing'ai and Empress Zhang of the state of Shu Han.

== In Romance of the Three Kingdoms ==
Xiahou Yuan is featured as a character in the 14th-century historical novel Romance of the Three Kingdoms, which romanticises the historical events before and during the Three Kingdoms period. He made several appearances in the novel, notably one during an archery contest between Cao Cao's officers at the newly made Bronze Bird Tower where he was shown as the most talented archer. But the most significant one was his death at the Battle of Mount Dingjun in 219. See Battle of Mount Dingjun#In fiction for details.

== In popular culture ==
Xiahou Yuan is featured as a playable character in Koei's Dynasty Warriors and Warriors Orochi video game series. In the games, he is Xiahou Dun's brother and is portrayed as being a bit hapless, but powerful and loyal nonetheless. He also appears in all instalments of the strategy game series Romance of the Three Kingdoms and the real-time wargame Kessen II, all of which were produced by Koei.

Xiahou Yuan also appears as a playable character in Total War: Three Kingdoms, and is prominently featured in the game as a general in the service of Cao Cao.

== See also ==
- Lists of people of the Three Kingdoms
