= Le'an Commandery =

Historic commandery of China

Le'an Commandery (Chinese: 樂安郡) was a historical commandery in China, located in present-day central and northern Shandong.

The commandery was established as Qiansheng Commandery (千乘郡) during Emperor Wu of Han's reign from part of Qi Commandery's territory. In late Western Han, it administered 15 counties: Qiansheng (千乘), Dongzou (東鄒), Shiwo (溼沃), Ping'an (平安), Bochang (博昌), Liaocheng (蓼城), Jianxin (建信), Di (狄), Langhuai (琅槐), Le'an (樂安), Beiyang (被陽), Gaochang (高昌), Fan'an (繁安), Gaowan (高宛) and Yanxiang (延鄉). In 60 AD, Qiansheng became the fief of Liu Jian (劉建), a son of Emperor Ming, who died the next year without issue. In 79, Qiansheng was granted to Liu Kang (劉伉), brother of Emperor He. The territory was renamed to Le'an in 95. Kang's grandson Hong (鴻) was the father of Emperor Zhi. After the latter's accession to the throne, Hong was gifted a richer territory, Bohai, as his new fief, and Le'an was converted back to an imperial commandery. By 140 AD, the number of counties and marquessates in Le'an had decreased to 9: Linji (臨濟, formerly Di), Qiansheng, Gaowan (高菀), Le'an, Bochang, Liaocheng, Li (利), Yi (益), and Shouguang (壽光).

In Western Jin, Le'an became the fief of Sima Jian (司馬鑒), a son of Sima Zhao, and then Jian's son Ji (籍). After Jin dynasty, Le'an became part of Liu Song dynasty until Emperor Ming's reign, when it was conquered by Northern Wei. The commandery was abolished in early Sui dynasty.

== Population ==
Dynasty	Western Han	Eastern Han	Western Jin	Liu Song	Northern Wei
Year	2	140	280	464	534
Households	116,727	74,400	11,000	2,259	5,916
Population	490,720	424,075		14,991	13,239
