= Hanzhong Campaign =

Conflicts between warlords Liu Bei and Cao Cao (217-219)

- Part of the wars at the end of the Han dynasty
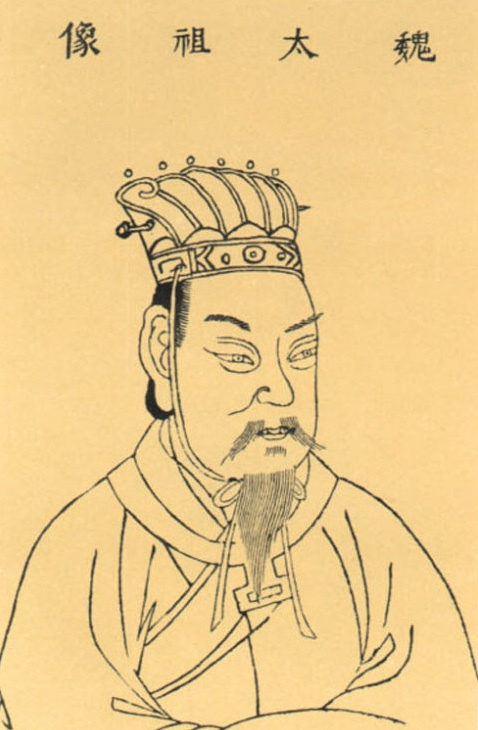
- A portrait of Cao Cao from Sancai Tuhui.
Date	December 217 – August 219
Location	Hanzhong, Shaanxi, China
Result	Liu Bei victory; Liu Bei takes control of Hanzhong

Belligerents
Liu Bei	Cao Cao

Commanders and leaders
Liu Bei	† Xiahou Yuan until February 219; Cao Cao from February 219

Hanzhong Campaign
- Traditional Chinese: 漢中之戰
- Simplified Chinese: 汉中之战
Transcriptions
Standard Mandarin
- Hanyu Pinyin: Hànzhōng Zhī Zhàn

The Hanzhong Campaign was a military campaign launched by the warlord Liu Bei to seize control of Hanzhong Commandery from his rival, Cao Cao. The campaign took place between December 217 and August 219 during the prelude to the Three Kingdoms period. Although Cao Cao's forces had settled in Hanzhong Commandery two years prior after the Battle of Yangping, they were worn out by an overall Fabian strategy employed by Liu Bei's forces, who used targeted attacks to capture strategic locations from the enemy. One of these attacks resulted in the death of Xiahou Yuan, one of Cao Cao's top generals, delivering a huge blow to the morale of Cao Cao's forces. Due to logistical and other issues, Cao Cao was eventually forced to abandon Hanzhong Commandery and order a retreat in June 219. Liu Bei emerged victorious in the campaign and occupied Hanzhong Commandery, after which he declared himself "King of Hanzhong" in August of that year.

The campaign would ultimately prove to be the final military campaign that Cao Cao participated in before his death in March 220.

== Background ==
In April 215, Cao Cao attacked the warlord Zhang Lu in Hanzhong Commandery, defeating the latter at the Battle of Yangping. In December, Zhang Lu surrendered and Hanzhong Commandery came under Cao Cao's control. Afterwards, Cao Cao appointed Pu Hu (朴胡), Du Huo (杜濩) and Yuan Yue (袁約) as Administrators of the three Ba commanderies. But they were defeated by Huang Quan who then seized control of Badong (巴東), Baxi (巴西) and Ba (巴) commanderies.

On Liu Bei's side, he had also recently seized control of Yi Province (covering present-day Sichuan and Chongqing) from Liu Zhang in July 214, and was in the midst of a dispute with his ally Sun Quan over Jing Province (covering present-day Hubei and Hunan) in July 215. Liu Bei felt threatened when he received news that Hanzhong Commandery had fallen to Cao Cao, because Hanzhong was the northern "gateway" into Yi Province and he was now in danger of losing Yi Province to Cao Cao. Hence, Liu Bei came to a border treaty with Sun Quan, who had seized Changsha (長沙), Guiyang (桂陽) and Lingling (零陵) commanderies in southern Jing Province from him. Liu Bei demanded Lingling Commandery back. In return, he recognised Sun Quan's control over Changsha, Jiangxia (江夏) and Guiyang commanderies.

=== Strategic difference ===
In Hanzhong Commandery, Sima Yi and Liu Ye urged Cao Cao to use the opportunity to attack Yi Province, but Cao Cao rejected the idea, saying to Sima Yi, "We should not be discontent. Now that we've already conquered Longyou (referring to present-day eastern Gansu), you're still longing about merging Shu (referring to Yi Province)!" (Note: Cao was alluding to Emperor Guangwu of Han, who expressed the idea in an edict to his general Cen Peng (岑彭) during his war to unify China; this was the origins of the chengyu "de Long wang Shu" (得陇望蜀), used to describe an ambitious or greedy person. The anecdote involving Emperor Guangwu and Cen Peng was first found in the Dongguan Hanji.) Cao Cao then left his generals Xiahou Yuan, Zhang He and Xu Huang behind to defend Hanzhong Commandery, and his Chief Clerk (長史) Du Xi to oversee the commandery's military affairs.

In December 217, Liu Bei's adviser Fa Zheng analysed the reason Cao Cao left Xiahou Yuan to guard Hanzhong Commandery and didn't push to conquer Yi province was not because of a lack of strength or insight but because he met some internal problems and was needed back at the capital. Fa Zheng also believed that Xiahou Yuan and Zhang He's ability didn't match those of Liu Bei's commanders, so the pair could not defend Hanzhong Commandery. Hence, Fa Zheng urged Liu Bei to attack Hanzhong Commandery, stating three benefits if the commandery could be taken: ideally it could serve as a base of operations to attack Cao Cao and revive the Han dynasty; if that were not possible one could still attack Yong and Liang provinces from it (Note: Hanzhong Commandery granted access to the two provinces.) and expand his territory; and finally Hanzhong Commandery had long-lasting strategical impact on the survival of Liu Bei's regime. Liu Bei agreed with Fa Zheng's analysis and ordered him to plan for the upcoming campaign.

== The campaign ==
=== Initial clashes ===
In December 217, Liu Bei's army advanced towards Yangping Pass (陽平關). At the same time, Liu Bei also sent Zhang Fei, Ma Chao, Wu Lan (吳蘭), Lei Tong (雷銅) and Ren Kui (任夔) to attack Wudu Commandery (武都郡), and they garrisoned at Xiabian County (下辨縣). During this time, Leiding (雷定) of the Di ethnic group led seven tribes to join Liu Bei. As for Cao Cao's side, Xiahou Yuan defended Yangping Pass, Zhang He and Xu Huang respectively guarded Guangshi (廣石) and Mamingge (馬鳴閣), while Cao Hong and Cao Xiu led a separate force to resist Zhang Fei, with Cao Xiu in a nominal advisory role but in practice sharing command by Cao Cao's order.

In April 218, Zhang Fei and Ma Chao had garrisoned their forces at Gushan (固山), where they spread news that they would blockade Cao Hong's retreat route. Cao Hong was preparing to attack Wu Lan at Xiabian County, but some of the officers under his command were suspicious of Zhang Fei and Ma Chao's movements. Cao Xiu concluded that their movements were merely a ruse to lure their forces out, stating, "The enemy's real intention in cutting off the road is to ambush and advance stealthily. Now they are making a show of force first, which they cannot do. We should attack Lan before they are assembled. If Lan is captured, Fei will flee on his own." Cao Hong agreed to Cao Xiu's tactic and attacked in the third month. Lei Tong and Ren Kui were killed in battle, while Wu Lan fled to join the Di tribes, where he was subsequently killed by Qiangduan (強端), a Di leader of Yinping (陰平). After their subordinate's defeat, Zhang Fei and Ma Chao withdrew their army, just as Cao Xiu foresaw.

On another front, Liu Bei was facing Xiahou Yuan at Yangping Pass, with frequent skirmishes throughout the year. Between May and August (summer) 218, Liu Bei sent Chen Shi with over ten battalions to attack Mamingge, but the latter was defeated by Xu Huang, and some of the fleeing soldiers fell into the deep valleys during their escape. Liu Bei personally led a night assault on Zhang He at Guangshi with over 10,000 troops divided into ten divisions, but was unable to overcome his enemy. He then sent an urgent letter to Zhuge Liang in Yi Province's capital, Chengdu, to request for reinforcements. Zhuge Liang vacillated and consulted Yang Hong (楊洪), who said, "Hanzhong is the throat of Yi Province. This is a critical point of survival and destruction. Without Hanzhong there will be no Shu (Yi Province). A disaster has befallen on the gates of our home. At this moment, the men should go to war, the women should help in transporting supplies, what's there to hesitate about sending reinforcements?" Zhuge Liang accepted Yang Hong's advice and sent reinforcements to Liu Bei while Liu Bei continued his standoff against Cao Cao's forces.

=== Turn of the tide ===
By October 218, Cao Cao moved from Ye city to Chang'an near Hanzhong Commandery to direct the defence against Liu Bei, but had been held up by internal problems including a major coup d'état and some local uprisings. In the meantime, Liu Bei and Xiahou Yuan had been locked in a stalemate for a year. In February 219, to break the deadlock, Liu Bei crossed the Mian River (沔水) south of Yangping Pass and advanced towards Hanzhong Commandery through the mountains. Liu Bei's army set up camp at Mount Dingjun. In response, Xiahou Yuan and Zhang He led their forces out in an attempt to take control of higher ground, and they made camp at Zouma Valley (走馬谷). During the night, Liu Bei set fire to the enemy camp fences. Xiahou Yuan led a force to defend the southern flank while sending Zhang He to guard the eastern side. Liu Bei launched a direct assault on Zhang He and Zhang started to falter, so Xiahou Yuan despatched half of his forces to support Zhang. At this point, Fa Zheng told Liu Bei that it was an opportune time to attack. Liu Bei ordered his men to shout loudly and beat the drums, and sent Huang Zhong to charge at the enemy. The mettlesome soldiers of Huang Zhong broke through the enemy lines and slew Xiahou Yuan and Zhao Yong, while Zhang He fled with his surviving troops to north of the Han River, where they set up a camp.

As Cao Cao's forces had just lost their commander, Xiahou Yuan, a tempest ensued. Du Xi and Guo Huai regrouped their scattered troops and (unofficially) nominated Zhang He to replace Xiahou Yuan. Zhang He accepted and gave orders to his troops, restoring peace and order in his army. The following day, Liu Bei planned to cross the Han River and attack Zhang He, whose officers pointed out they were outnumbered, and suggested to Zhang He to set up camps along the banks of the Han River. Guo Huai felt that their forces were displaying weakness to the enemy by doing so, he proposed setting up camp far away from the river to lure the enemy to cross the shallow, during which they counterattack the enemy. Zhang He agreed with Guo Huai's idea and moved his camp further away from the river. Liu Bei became suspicious and did not dare to cross the river. In Chang'an, when Cao Cao heard that Xiahou Yuan had been killed in action, he dispatched Cao Zhen with an army to reinforce their forces at Yangping Pass. When Cao Zhen arrived, he directed Xu Huang to attack Gao Xiang, an officer under Liu Bei. Xu Huang scored a victory and temporarily restored some morale for Cao Cao's side.

=== Last stages ===
In April 219, Cao Cao personally led an army from Chang'an to Hanzhong Commandery via Xie Valley (斜谷). Liu Bei was not worried, as he thought, "Even if Cao Cao came, he cannot do anything. I'll definitely take control of the Han River." Hence, Liu Bei gathered his forces and put up a firm defence, refusing to engage Cao Cao's army in a major confrontation. Liu Bei focused on a war of attrition from this point forward. As the months pass by stuck in this deadlock, more and more of Cao Cao's soldiers either died or deserted.

Later, when Cao Cao's forces were transporting supplies via Beishan (北山), Huang Zhong led a force to rob the enemy's supplies, but had yet to return on time. Zhao Yun led ten horsemen out of camp in search of Huang Zhong and encountered Cao Cao's army. They were surrounded but Zhao Yun fought his way out and retreated back to camp with the enemy in pursuit. Upon reaching camp, Zhao Yun ordered the gates to be opened, flags and banners to be lowered, and the beating of war drums to be stopped. Cao Cao's men feared an ambush in the camp and turned back. Just then, Zhao Yun ordered his troops to beat the drums loudly and his archers to rain arrows on the enemy. Cao Cao's soldiers were thrown into confusion and trampled on each other as they attempted to flee, while many drowned as they tried to escape across the Han River.

As Cao Cao's forces had been in a standoff against Liu Bei for several months and had been facing serious logistics problems, he eventually gave an order, "chicken rib" (雞肋). No one understood what Cao Cao meant when he said "chicken rib", except his registrar, Yang Xiu. Yang Xiu explained that it was a pity to discard a piece of chicken's rib even though it may not have much meat on it. This was an analogy to the situation Cao Cao was in: Cao Cao knew that he had little chance of defeating Liu Bei, but felt that it was a pity to abandon Hanzhong Commandery. Cao Cao was not pleased with Yang Xiu's explanation and later had him executed. By June 219, Cao Cao retreated back to Chang'an and gave up Hanzhong Commandery to Liu Bei.

== Aftermath ==
In July 219, one month after the capture of Hanzhong, Liu Bei sent Meng Da to attack Fangling Commandery (房陵郡) via Zigui County. Meng Da defeated and killed Fangling Commandery's Administrator, Kuai Qi (蒯祺), and took control of the area. Liu Bei later sent his adopted son, Liu Feng, to attack Shangyong Commandery (上庸郡) via the Mian River (沔水). Shangyong Commandery's Administrator, Shen Dan (申耽), surrendered to Liu Feng. In around August 219, Liu Bei declared himself "King of Hanzhong".

On the other hand, after withdrawing, Cao Cao was worried that Liu Bei might attack Wudu Commandery, so he ordered Zhang Ji, the Inspector (刺史) of Yong Province, to relocate 50,000 Di people from Wudu Commandery to Fufeng (扶風) and Tianshui (天水) commanderies.

Word of Liu Bei's victory at Hanzhong eventually reached Guan Yu, who was, at the time, stationed in southern Jing province. Seeking to build on the victory at Hanzhong, Guan Yu led an army of his own to attack Cao Cao's strongholds in northern Jing province, leading to the Battle of Fancheng in July of 219.

== Order of battle ==
=== Liu Bei forces ===
- Governor of Yi Province (益州牧) Liu Bei
- General Who Spreads Martial Might (揚武將軍) Fa Zheng
- General Who Attacks Barbarians (討虜將軍) Huang Zhong
- Vice General of the Household in the Army (副軍中郎將) Liu Feng
- Administrator of Yidu (宜都太守) Meng Da
- Major General (裨将军) Chen Shi
- Gao Xiang
- Assisting General of the Army (翊軍將軍) Zhao Yun
- Zhang Zhu (張著)
- Chief of Mianyang (沔陽長) Zhang Yi
- General Who Attacks Barbarians (征虜將軍) Zhang Fei
- General Who Pacifies the West (平西將軍) Ma Chao
- † Wu Lan (吳蘭)
- † Lei Tong (雷銅)
- † Ren Kui (任夔)

Non-participants

- General of the Imperial Consular (军师将军) Zhuge Liang
- Attendant Clerk (从事) Yang Hong

=== Cao Cao forces ===
- Imperial Chancellor (丞相) Cao Cao
- Protector of the Army Who Attacks Shu (征蜀護軍) Cao Zhen
- (executed) Registrar (主簿) Yang Xiu
- † General Who Attacks the West (征西將軍) Xiahou Yuan
- † Inspector of Yi Province (益州刺史) Zhao Yong
- General Who Defeats Bandits (盪寇將軍) Zhang He
- Chief Commandant of Escorting Cavalry (駙馬都尉) Du Xi
- Major (司馬) Guo Huai
- † Xiahou Rong (夏侯榮)
- Protector-General (都護將軍) Cao Hong
- Cavalry Commandant of the Tiger and Leopard Cavalry ((虎豹骑)骑都尉) Cao Xiu
- Palace Attendant (侍中) Xin Pi
- Administrator of Wudu (武都太守) Yang Fu
- General Who Pacifies Bandits (平寇將軍) Xu Huang
- (surrendered) (Acting) Colonel (校尉) Wang Ping
- † Administrator of Fangling (房陵太守) Kuai Qi (蒯祺) (Note: This Kuai Qi was a nephew of Kuai Yue and Kuai Liang and may have married Zhuge Liang's oldest sister. Kuai Qi's clan junior Kuai Qin's (蒯钦) mother was a sister of Yang Jun's father.)
- (surrendered) Administrator of Shangyong (上庸太守) Shen Dan (申耽)

Non-participants

- Inspector of Yong Province (雍州刺史) Zhang Ji

== Bibliography ==
- Chen, Shou. Records of the Three Kingdoms (Sanguozhi).
- Chang, Qu (4th century). Chronicles of Huayang (Huayang Guo Zhi).
- Fang, Xuanling. Book of Jin (Jin Shu).
- Pei, Songzhi. Annotated Records of the Three Kingdoms (Sanguozhi zhu).
- Sima, Guang (1084), Zizhi Tongjian.
  - de Crespigny, Rafe (1996). To Establish Peace: being the Chronicle of the Later Han dynasty for the years 189 to 220 AD as recorded in Chapters 59 to 69 of Sima Guang's Zizhi Tongjian. Vol. 2. Canberra: Faculty of Asian Studies, The Australian National University. ISBN 0-7315-2536-1.
