= Battle of Mount Dingjun =

Battle between warlords Liu Bei and Cao Cao (219)

Coordinates: 32°52′46″N 103°51′53″E

- Part of the Hanzhong Campaign
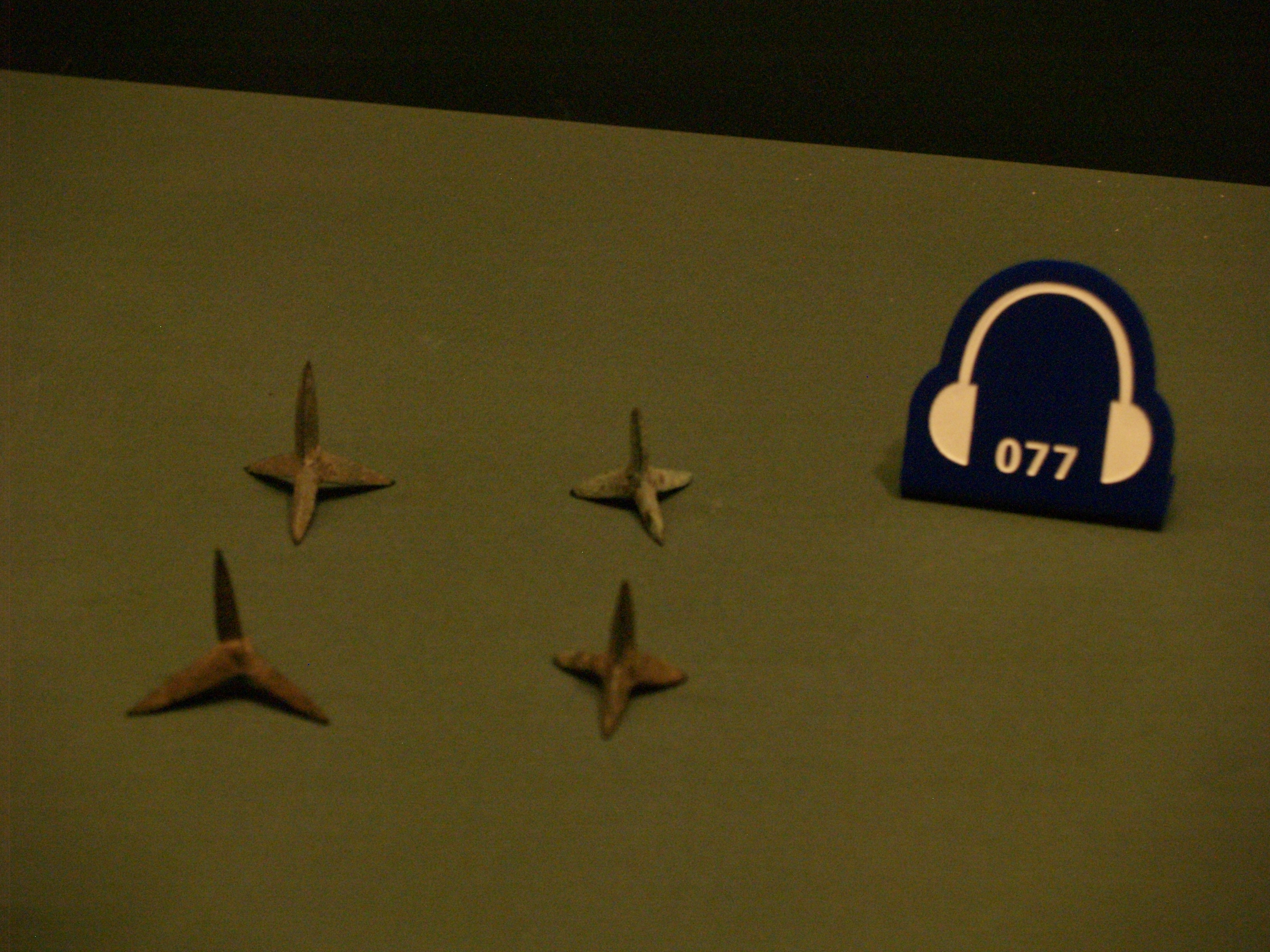
- Caltrops excavated from Mount Dingjun, dated to the Three Kingdoms period
| Date | February 219 |
| Location | Foot of Mount Dingjun, Shaanxi, China |
| Result | Liu Bei victory; Xiahou Yuan killed |
| Territorial changes | Hanzhong Commandery largely conquered |

Belligerents
| Forces of Liu Bei | Forces of Cao Cao |

Commanders and leaders
| Liu Bei; Huang Zhong; Fa Zheng | Xiahou Yuan †; Xiahou Rong †; Zhang He; Zhao Ang †; Guo Huai |

Battle of Mount Dingjun
- Traditional Chinese: 定軍山之戰
- Simplified Chinese: 定军山之战
Transcriptions
Standard Mandarin
- Hanyu Pinyin: Dìngjūnshān Zhī Zhàn

The Battle of Mount Dingjun was fought between the warlords Liu Bei and Cao Cao in February 219 during the prelude to the Three Kingdoms stretch of Chinese history. Liu Bei's victory in the battle marked a major milestone in his Hanzhong Campaign and allowed him to kill the commander of the Wei's forces, Xiahou Yuan and later taking Hanzhong Commandery.

== Battle ==
In December 217, Liu Bei led a campaign to attack Hanzhong, which was under the control of Cao Cao. His force met with resistance led by Xiahou Yuan at Yangping Pass (陽平關). The confrontation dragged on for more than a year until one night, Liu Bei set fire to the barbed fence around Xiahou Yuan's camp at the foot of Mount Dingjun. Alarmed by the attack, Xiahou Yuan sent Zhang He to defend the eastern corner of the camp, while he guarded the south. Liu Bei's main force pressed against Zhang He, outmatching the latter. Xiahou Yuan had to dispatch a fraction of his own troops to Zhang He's rescue.

Fa Zheng saw that the situation was turning in their favor and advised to attack the Wei forces. Although Xiahou Yuan's soldiers were more experienced; Huang Zhong rallied his men, led the charge forward and along with "drums that shook the heavens and shouts that moved the valley" they descended upon Xiahou Yuan's forces. The battle became a rout. Xiahou Yuan and his son Xiahou Rong were both killed in action along with his deputy.

== In Romance of the Three Kingdoms ==
In chapter 71 of the 14th-century historical novel Romance of the Three Kingdoms, Xiahou Yuan had his camp set up on Mount Dingjun, so he could easily see the enemy camp at the bottom of the mountain. Huang Zhong moved his camp nearer and nearer to Xiahou Yuan's camp every few days.

Later, Xiahou Yuan came up with a strategy to lure Huang Zhong and capture him. He sent Xiahou Shang to Huang Zhong's camp, challenging Huang to come out and fight him. However, Chen Shi, Huang Zhong's subordinate, volunteered to fight Xiahou Shang. Xiahou Shang feigned defeat and retreated. Chen Shi would not give up and pursued Xiahou Shang, but fell into an ambush set by Xiahou Yuan and was captured. Xiahou Yuan was not very happy as he had expected to capture Huang Zhong. Xiahou Shang was later captured by Huang Zhong in battle.

Xiahou Yuan decided to release Chen Shi in return for Xiahou Shang, which Huang Zhong agreed. The next day, at the frontline, where the prisoners were exchanged, Huang Zhong fired an arrow at Xiahou Shang and wounded him. Xiahou Yuan was furious and wanted to fight Huang Zhong but was stopped by Zhang He. Xiahou Yuan had no choice but to return to his camp and defend firmly.

At the advice of Fa Zheng, Huang Zhong moved his forces to Mount Tiandang, a nearby mountain with a higher peak. Xiahou Yuan could not tolerate enemy forces having the vantage point, and decided to attack Mount Tiandang. Huang Zhong, however, kept his forces back and did not engage Xiahou Yuan.

Later, Fa Zheng saw that Xiahou Yuan's forces were dispirited. He then signaled Huang Zhong to attack Xiahou Yuan. Xiahou Yuan could not respond in time and was killed by Huang Zhong, who cleaved Xiahou right beneath the shoulders. The victory consolidated Huang Zhong's position as one of the Five Tiger Generals.

When Cao Cao heard of Xiahou Yuan's death, he broke down in tears. Only then did he understand the words of the soothsayer Guan Lu (管辂):

Three and eight run criss-cross (The year was the twenty-fourth of Jian'an or AD 219);

A yellow Pig meets a Tiger (It was the month of the Tiger in the year of the Pig);

South of the halted army (Actually the south of Mount Dingjun (which means a halted army));

A limb will be lost (Referring to Xiahou Yuan, who was said to be a good, loyal friend and cousin of Cao Cao).

== In popular culture ==
The battle is also reenacted in Peking opera, based on the novel. It was said that the actor playing Xiahou Yuan would get a red envelope for his performance during the Chinese New Year, since it is considered bad fortune to be "killed" on stage at that time of the year. The first Chinese film ever made, Dingjun Mountain (1905), was a recording of the Peking opera.

The Battle of Mount Dingjun is featured in Koei's popular video game franchise Dynasty Warriors, starting from the third entry onwards.
