= Xiahou Ying =

Han dynasty politician

- 夏侯嬰

Minister Coachman 太僕
- In office 206–172 BC
- Monarchs: Emperor Gaozu of Han; Emperor Hui of Han; Emperor Wen of Han

Personal details
- Born: Unknown Pei County, Jiangsu
- Died: 172 BC
- Children: Xiahou Zao
- Occupation: Politician
- Posthumous name: Marquis Wen (文侯)
- Peerage: Marquis of Ruyin (汝陰侯)
- Other names: "Lord Teng" (滕公)

Xiahou Ying (夏侯嬰; died 172 BC (Note: This corresponds to the eighth year of the Qianyuan period of Emperor Wen's reign. The year corresponds to 29 October 173 BC to 16 November 172 BC in the proleptic Julian calendar.)), posthumously known as Marquis Wen of Ruyin, was a Chinese politician who served under Liu Bang (Emperor Gaozu), the founding emperor of the Han dynasty, and two of his successors. A friend of Liu Bang, he first joined Liu in the rebellions against the Qin dynasty from 209 to 206 BC, and later fought on Liu's side against his rival Xiang Yu during the Chu–Han Contention (206–202 BC). After the Han dynasty was established, he served as Minister Coachman (太僕). He is also referred to as "Lord Teng" (滕公), a title said to be derived from tengling fengche (滕令奉車), the position he held when he was serving as the carriage driver of the magistrate of Teng County.

== Early life ==
Xiahou was from Pei County in present-day Jiangsu and he started his career as an officer in charge of chariots and carriages in the county office. Whenever he drove past Sishui Village (泗水亭), one of the villages in Pei County, he would visit his friend Liu Bang, then a patrol officer in the village, and spend a long time chatting with him.

On one occasion, Liu Bang pulled a prank on Xiahou, causing him to be injured. The county magistrate found out about the incident and ordered an investigation. Under the law of the Qin dynasty at the time, Liu Bang would be punished more severely than a civilian because he was an officeholder, albeit a low-ranking one. When Liu Bang and Xiahou were both taken in for questioning, they denied each other's involvement in the incident. The case was initially closed but it was reopened when a new magistrate took office and it was discovered that Xiahou had lied. Although Xiahou was arrested, flogged hundreds of times, and imprisoned for over a year, he still continued to cover up for Liu Bang.

== Rebelling against the Qin dynasty ==
In 209 BC, when uprisings broke out throughout China against the Qin dynasty, Liu Bang started a rebellion in Pei County too. Xiahou joined him and assisted him seizing control of the county; Liu Bang then declared himself the "Duke of Pei" (沛公), made Xiahou a seventh-grade official (七大夫), and appointed him as his personal carriage driver.

When Liu Bang was attacking Huling (胡陵; northeast of present-day Longgu Town, Pei County, Jiangsu), Xiahou and Xiao He managed to persuade the Qin officer guarding Huling to surrender to Liu Bang. For his achievement, Xiahou was promoted to a fifth-grade official (五大夫).

Between 209 and 206 BC, Xiahou joined Liu Bang's rebel group in attacking Qin forces at various locations: Dang County (碭縣), Jiyang (濟陽) and Yongqiu (雍丘), all in present-day eastern Henan; Dong'e (東阿; present-day Liaocheng, Shandong); Puyang; Kaifeng; Luoyang; Nanyang; Lantian; and Zhiyang (芷陽; east of present-day Xi'an, Shaanxi). During battle, he was known for driving his chariot at high speed and striking at the enemy with sheer ferocity. In one battle at Kaifeng, he captured 68 enemy soldiers, received the surrender of 850 others, and obtained a box of golden seals. For his achievements, he was consecutively promoted to zhibo (執帛) and later zhigui (執珪). Liu Bang also gave him the title "Lord Teng" (滕公), which he became commonly referred to as.

After the Qin dynasty was overthrown by the rebels in 206 BC, the former Qin Empire was divided into the Eighteen Kingdoms, each ruled by a rebel leader or surrendered Qin general. Liu Bang became the King of Han (漢王) and was given a domain in the remote Bashu region (present-day Chongqing and Sichuan). He appointed Xiahou as Minister Coachman (太僕) and made him the Marquis of Zhaoping (昭平侯).

== Chu–Han Contention ==
From 206 to 202 BC, Xiahou fought on Liu Bang's side against his rival, Xiang Yu, in a power struggle for supremacy over China historically known as the Chu–Han Contention. Around 206 BC, Han Xin, then a low-ranking supply officer in Liu Bang's forces, was implicated in a capital case involving 13 others and was about to be executed, with Xiahou supervising the executions. When it was his turn to be beheaded, Han Xin looked at Xiahou and asked, "Does the King of Han not want to gain control of the Empire? Why does he execute warriors then?" Xiahou sensed that Han Xin was no ordinary soldier so he pardoned him. After talking to Han Xin, Xiahou recognised his talent and brought him to see Xiao He, one of Liu Bang's chief advisers, who in turn recommended Han Xin to Liu Bang. However, Liu Bang was initially unimpressed with Han Xin.

When Liu Bang first moved into Bashu, many of his followers lost faith in him and deserted. Disappointed that Liu Bang did not appreciate his talent, Han Xin left as well. Upon hearing of Han Xin's departure, Xiao He rushed off to find him and bring him back. Xiahou followed after them, caught up with them, and, together with Xiao He, managed to convince Han Xin to return to Liu Bang. Finally recognising Han Xin as a valuable asset, Liu Bang appointed him as a general.

In 205 BC, when Liu Bang was defeated by Xiang Yu at the Battle of Pengcheng and forced to retreat, he fled with his son and daughter on a carriage driven by Xiahou. During their retreat, they were pursued by the enemy so Liu Bang panicked and attempted to abandon his children in order to lighten the carriage and allow it to move faster. Each time he tried to force his children off the carriage, Xiahou stopped him and picked them up again. Liu Bang was so furious with Xiahou that he threatened to kill him each time he did that, but Xiahou pleaded with him not to abandon the children. Eventually, they managed to escape and Xiahou safely delivered Liu Bang's children to their base in the Guanzhong region.

== Service under Liu Bang ==
In 202 BC, Liu Bang defeated Xiang Yu at the Battle of Gaixia and established the Han dynasty as the ruling dynasty in China with himself as the emperor. To reward Xiahou for his contributions, the emperor made him the Marquis of Ruyin (汝陰侯). Xiahou also continued serving as Minister Coachman (太僕) in the Han government.

During Liu Bang's reign, Xiahou accompanied the emperor into battle against some vassal kings who had rebelled against the emperor. In 200 BC, he also covered Liu Bang as the emperor retreated after the Han forces were defeated by the Xiongnu at the Battle of Baideng.

== Later life and death ==
After Liu Bang's death in 195 BC, Xiahou continued serving as Minister Coachman under Liu Bang's son and successor Liu Ying (Emperor Hui), who was effectively a puppet ruler under the control of his mother Empress Lü and her clan. The period of Empress Lü's regency when the Lüs dominated the Han government is historically known as the Lü Clan Disturbance.

In 180 BC, following Empress Lü's death, the Lüs were ousted from power and exterminated. Xiahou, along with others, supported the restoration of the Lius to power and aided Liu Heng (Emperor Wen), another of Liu Bang's sons, in becoming emperor.

Xiahou continued serving under Emperor Wen until his death in 172 BC; he was given the posthumous title "Marquis Wen" (文侯; 'civil marquis').

== Descendants ==
Many of Xiahou's descendants were active towards the end of the Han dynasty. The most prominent ones were the generals Xiahou Dun and Xiahou Yuan, who served under the warlord Cao Cao. Their descendants also served in the state of Cao Wei during the Three Kingdoms period.
