= Tiantang Peak =

Mountain in Guangzhou, China

Tiantang Peak 天堂顶
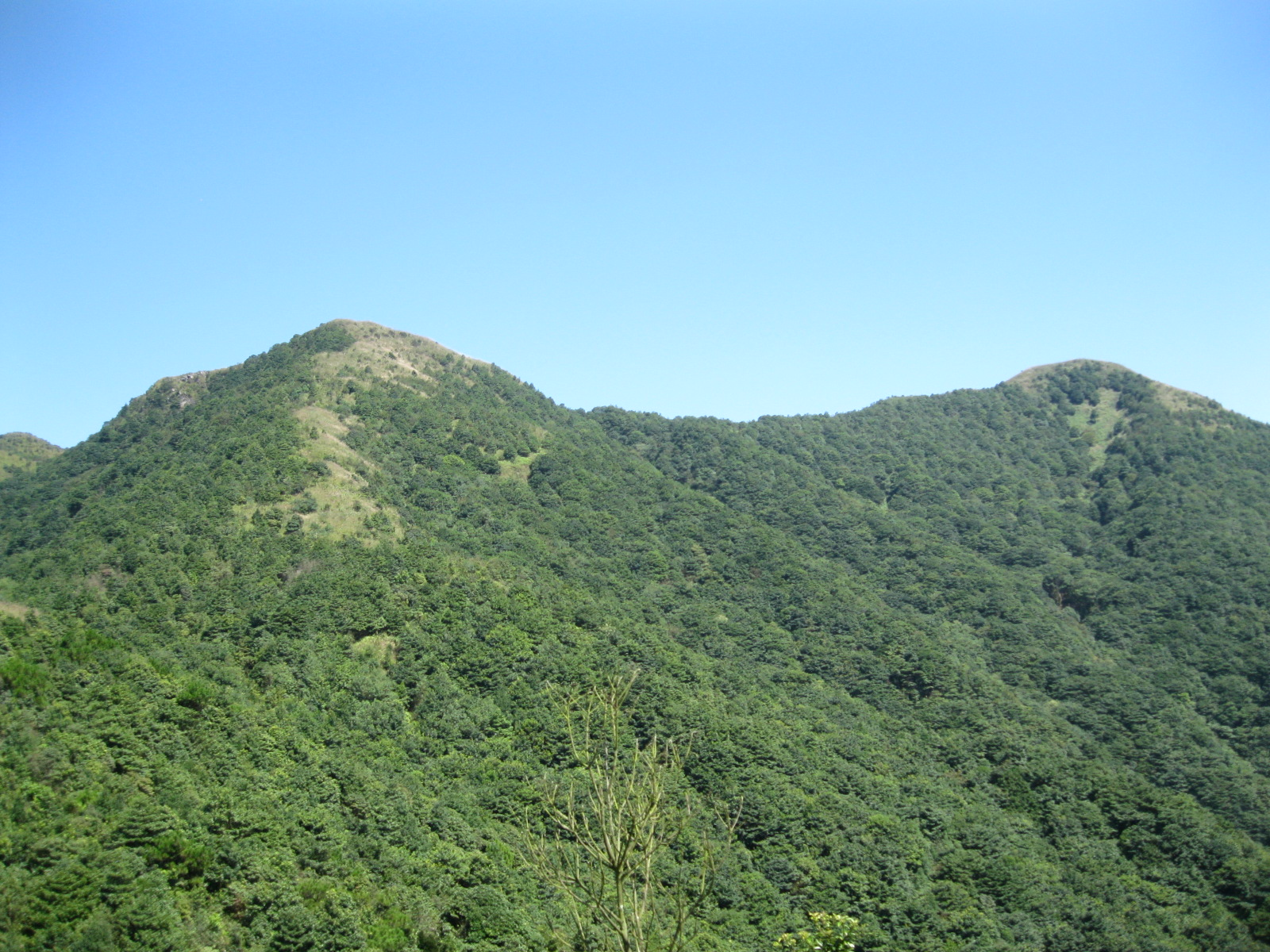
- Tiantang Peak (right) and its subpeak

Highest point
- Elevation: 1,210 m (3,970 ft)
- Coordinates: 23°39′16.59″N 113°48′52.11″E

Geography
- Location within Guangdong
- Location: On the border between Conghua District and Longmen County, Guangdong, China
- Parent range: Jiulian Mountains

Tiantang Peak (simplified Chinese: 天堂顶; traditional Chinese: 天堂頂; pinyin: Tiāntáng Dǐng; lit. 'Heavenly Peak') is the highest mountain in Guangzhou, China, with an altitude of 1,210 metres (3,970 ft). It lies in the northeast of Guangzhou and 80 km away from the municipal area. It is part of the Shimen National Forest Park and the border division mountain between Conghua District and Longmen County.

== See also ==
- Mount Jizhen, second highest mountain of Guangzhou.
