= Buddha Head Mountain =

Chinese tourist attraction

Buddha Head Mountain, also known as Fotou Mountain, is a tourist attraction in Pingchang County, Bazhong, Sichuan, China. It covers an area of 23.6 square kilometers. It is an important tourist attraction in Pingchang County and is also a 4A-level scenic spot.
