= Mount Jizhen =

Mountain in Guangzhou, China

Mount Jizhen 鸡枕山
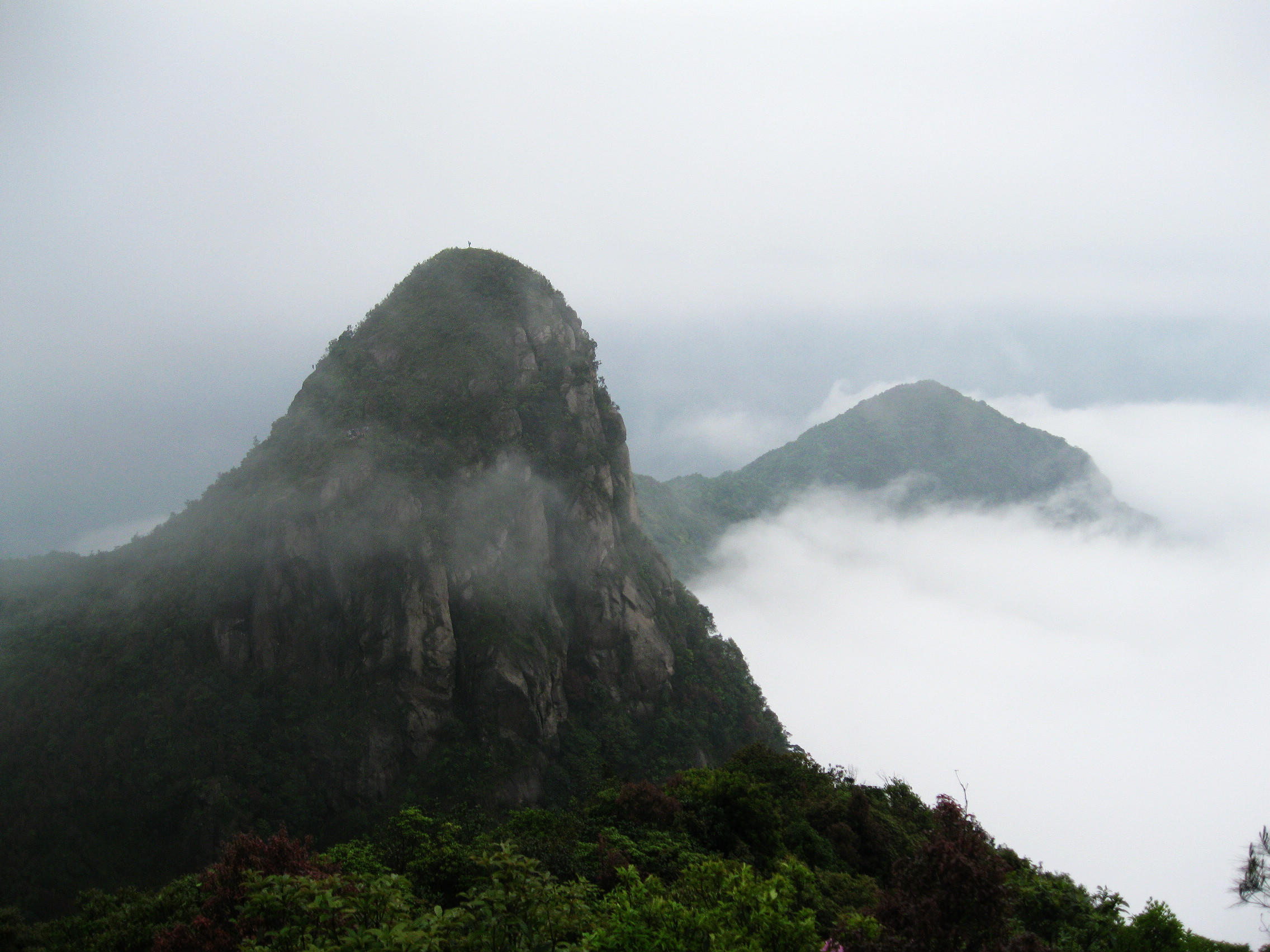
- The subpeak of Jizhen Mountain

Highest point
- Elevation: 1,175 m (3,855 ft)
- Coordinates: 23°45′4.97″N 113°50′28.63″E

Geography
- Location within China
- Location: Conghua, Guangdong, China
- Parent range: Jiulian Mountains

Mount Jizhen (simplified Chinese: 鸡枕山; traditional Chinese: 雞枕山; pinyin: Jīzhěn Shān; lit. 'Cockscomb Mountain') is the second highest mountain in Guangzhou, China, with an altitude of 1,175 metres (3,855 ft), just 35 meters lower than Tiantang Peak.

It bases at the east of Liuxi River National Forest Park. The mountain was named of cockscomb for its summit and subpeak together looks like cockscomb in the distance. The subpeak, which rises to a height of 1,146.7 metres (3,762 ft) above sea level, is much more famous than the main peak. This results some people mistakenly used its height as the mountain's elevation.
