= Yuanshan, Pingchang County =

Yuanshan 元山镇
- Town
- Location in Sichuan
- Coordinates: 31°41′25″N 107°9′20″E
- Country: People's Republic of China
- Province: Sichuan
- Prefecture-level city: Bazhong
- County: Pingchang County
- Time zone: UTC+8 (China Standard)

Yuanshan (Chinese: 元山; pinyin: Yuánshān) is a town of Pingchang County, Sichuan, China. As of 2018, it has two residential communities and 14 villages under its administration.
