= Sima Water Town =

Tourist attraction in Sichuan, China

Sima Water Town is a tourist attraction located in a village and town in Pingchang County, Bazhong, Sichuan, China.

== Attractions ==
The representative attractions include:

- Clean Energy Industrial Park
- Filial Piety Cultural Park
- Modern Agriculture Demonstration Park,
- Sima National Wetland Park
