= Baiyi Ancient Town =

Town in Sichuan, China

Baiyi Ancient Town is a famous water town in Pingchang County, Bazhong, Sichuan, China. It is also one of the tourist destinations summarized by the Pingchang government, covering an area of 23 square kilometers.
