= Shimen National Forest Park =

National Nature Park in China

Shimen National Forest Park is the largest forest park in Guangdong Province.

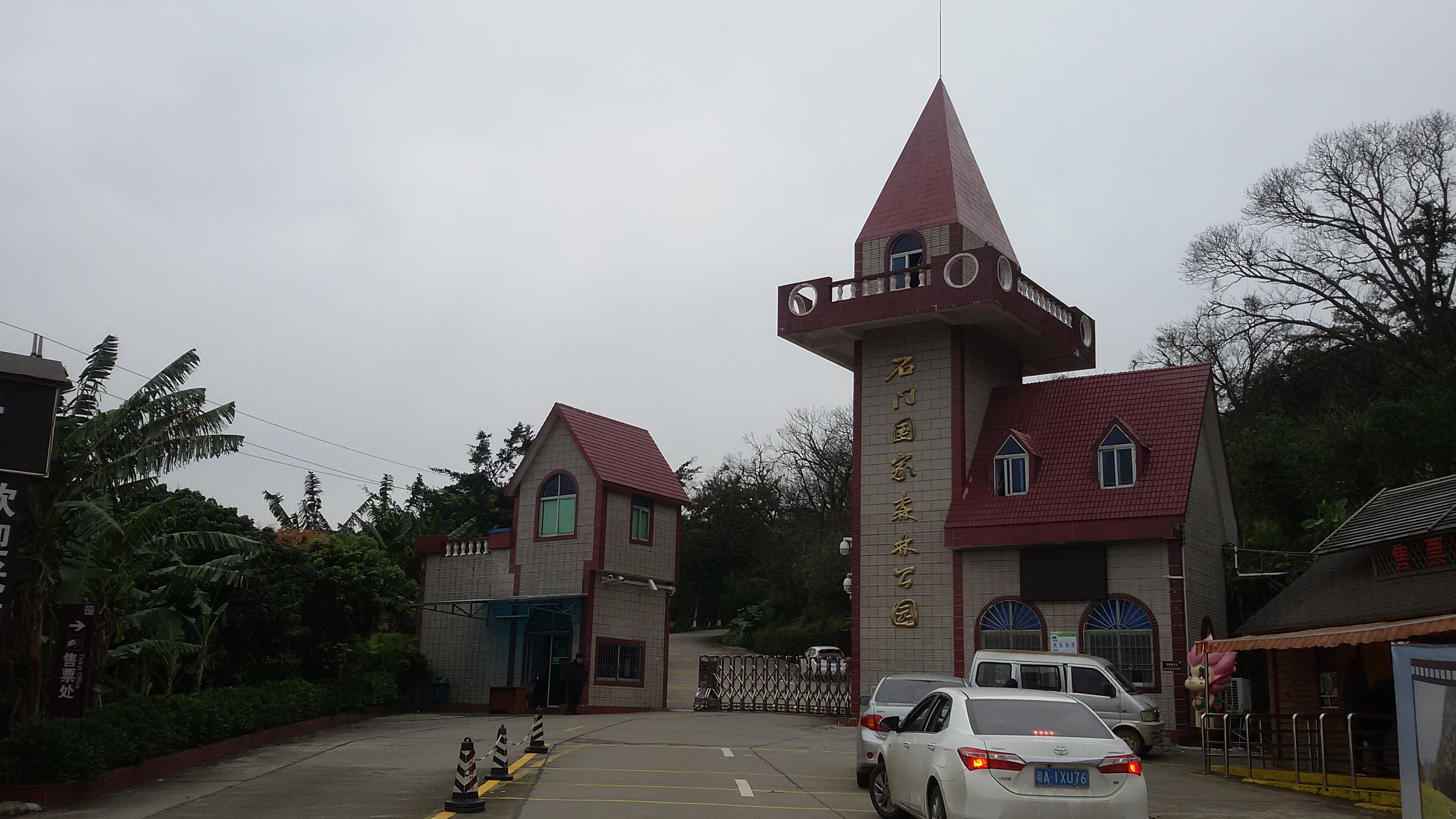
The entrance to Sakmun National Forest Park

== Geography ==
Located in the Tsunghua District of Guangzhou City, Guangdong Province, with a total area of 2626.67 hectares and a forest coverage rate of 96.76%. It is 86 kilometers from Guangzhou city and 13 kilometers from the famous Tsunhua hot spring, bordered by the Nankun Mountain Nature Reserve to the east, and overlooks the Guangzhou Hydroelectric Storage Power Plant and Liushihe National Forest Park to the north. Located in the subtropical zone, the climate is warm all year round with an average annual temperature of 21.4 °C, an average maximum temperature of 28.5 °C from July to August and an average minimum temperature of 12.4 °C from January to February.

== Establishment history ==
Shimen Park was established on the basis of the state-owned Dalinshan Forest Farm, founded in 1960. In 1995, Shimen National Forest Park was established with the approval of the Ministry of Forestry, which is the first international forest bathing resort approved by the former Ministry of Forestry.

== Flora and Fauna ==
There are mainly three categories of trees in the park: maple, sapium discolor, and Red Maple.
