= EYG =

EYG or eyg may refer to:

== EYG ==
- EYG, division code for Enyang, Bazhong, China
- EYG, abbreviation for Cypriot football club Evagoras Paphos
- EYG Plano Eagles, a team in the Women's Basketball Development Association
- :EYG:, a member of Caustic (band)

== eyg ==
- eyg, abbreviation for eyegone, one of the four Drosophila PAX6 orthologues
