= BZX =

BZX or bzx may refer to:

- BZX, the IATA code for Bazhong Enyang Airport, Sichuan, China
- bzx, the ISO 639-3 code for Hainyaxo Bozo language
