= Sichuan-Shaanxi Soviet Union General Monument Forest Memorial Hall =

Soviet monument in Sichuan, China

The Sichuan-Shaanxi Soviet Union General Monument Forest Memorial Hall(Chinese Name:川陕苏区将帅碑林纪念馆) is located at the top of Nannique Mountain, which covers an area of more than 150 acres, 2 kilometers south of Bazhou District, Bazhong City, Sichuan Province. After years of construction, the ten regions of individual attractions constitute the main building group of the entire General Monument Forest. The architecture of the monument forest is different from other gardens: it departs from the "central axis" or "symmetrical arrangement" pattern of garden architecture and is built by the free layout of the mountain, forming a unique landscape. It is a national tertiary cultural relics monument. It is a part of the greater Nankan Mountain Scenic Area.

== Forest of Steles Promenade ==
The construction of monument promenade is built according to the terrain and follows the mountain. It is winding and undulating and extends in twists and turns. The shape of the entire promenade is hut-shan and overhanging mountain style and the building is a hut-shan roof in the middle for the overhanging mountain roof at both ends of the building. At the intersection of the two ends of the horizontal corridor, there are four corners of the saved spire protruding from the hutong and overhanging roof to increase the height of the staggered modeling aesthetic. The ridge of the roof, only the ridge, hanging ridge, bump ridge, face no forked ridge. Because it is not a wood structure, but a reinforced concrete structure, the four "outside corner" (also known as wing corner) structures, only the eaves service intersection, and no sub-corner beam, old corner beam, and hanging column. Column, beam junction also did not support the arch. So the Castlewood promenade belongs to simple antique architecture. Its square corridor pillars, corridor edge, through the tease and eaves service, all by the reinforced concrete cast-in-place structure, so the top has no wooden jue, all with 5 cm thick prefabricated panels laid, covered with golden yellow glazed tiles. The gallery is 7.5 meters high, 6 meters wide, and more than 1500 meters long. The corridor is divided into the inner, middle, and outer three lines, six sides, each side paste 0.6 m × 1.2 m (2 ft 0 in × 3 ft 11 in) black granite monument plate of the Red Army personal memorial single monument, a monument engraved with the portrait of the Red Army, resume and the names of relatives. Which not only to understand the Red Army himself detailed growth history, and service, and to participate in the revolutionary experience but also for our study of the Red Army's revolutionary history and party history provides valuable information.

The words of the two forests of steles were collected by an old man. He traveled nearly 200 times for 30 years, and traveled more than 700,000 kilometers to 29 provinces, cities (districts), and built a building covering an area of 120. There are more than 4,280 styles, and there are general steles in Sichuan, Shaanxi, and Soviet areas that record the tragic and solemn journey of the Red Fourth Front, such as the promenade and the Red Army Cemetery. His name is Zhang Chonggyu. And in 2020, the old man Zhang Chongyu donated the handwriting of famous and famous people he collected for many years to the Sichuan-Shaanxi Revolutionary Base Museum and the Sichuan-Shaanxi Soviet Area General Commander's Forest of Steles for collection. The donation includes the handwriting and calligraphy of national leaders, marshals, senior generals, and famous Chinese and foreign celebrities who selflessly contributed to the two forests of styles, as well as the heart-language handwriting, seals, hand molds and some red history books and historical materials of the Red Army officers and men, totaling 5,147 pieces.

== Memorial statue garden of the main generals of the Fourth Red Front Army ==
The "Red Fourth Front Army Major Generals Memorial Statue Garden" was inscribed by Major General Wang Dinglie, the former vice commander of the Air Force. Like the garden by Xu Qianqiang, Chen Changhao, Wang Shusheng, Li Xiannian, Ni Zhiliang, Zhang Qinqiu, Fu Zhong, Zeng Chuanliu, Zhou Chunquan, Zhou Guangtan, and Zhang Guotao and other sculptures. The statue is a bust carved from red granite, 1.5 meters high and 1.1 meters wide at the shoulder. The whole statue base consists of a base and seat, 2.5 meters high, and 4 meters high. It means that the Fourth Red Front Army consists of the 25th Army and the 4th Red Army. Six cedars are planted on the back, like the revolutionary spirit of the Red Army, which is as vigorous and long-lasting as the pine. The back engraved biography. Zhang Guotao statue for special placement. Located at the beginning of the corridor of the monument forest, meaning that he had lived in the main leadership of the Fourth Red Front Army; and a zigzag arrangement of the former statue 8 meters apart, erected in the line of equality below 1.5 meters, and face to face with the former statue. It means a difference of opinion. The design concept of the memorial statue park adopts the composition of simple and clear straight lines, and the visiting platform is composed of three rectangular planes overlapping the upper, middle, and lower. The front left and right sides are in the form of a circular ladder, after the upper, middle, and lower are reunited into one grid composition. It symbolizes the rendezvous of the First, Second and Fourth Front Armies, which achieved the victory of the Chinese Communist Revolution. The length and width ratio of the statue garden is composed of 26.5 meters and 16.37 meters respectively. It is composed of the "golden division" method, which has aesthetic value in plastic art. It is surrounded by green stone railings, and the stairs from both ends go up and down. The design concept of the whole park is like that. It not only reflects the solemn, serious, elegant, and harmonious layout but also contains a novel, unique, far-reaching, and implicit meaning. It is a complete and integral shape that combines meaning and type.

== The Monument to the Heroes of the Red Army in the Sichuan-Shaanxi Soviet Area ==
The monument is located at the end of a ridge of beams in the shape of an "E" at the top of the hill, and the main monument is in the form of a quadrilateral trapezoidal terrace. The monument is 9.7 meters in height and consists of a circular base, the body of the monument, and an abstract "C" and "H" letter ornament forming a gun at the top. The overall height of the monument is 12.23 meters. It means that the Fourth Red Front Army created the second largest Soviet area in China with "one gun and one cannon"; 120,000 people joined the Red Army in Tong, Nan, Ba, and Ping counties and cities; and established Soviet power in 1 province, 2 provinces and 23 counties (cities) for the base area; the monument was built in 1997 when Hong Kong returned to the motherland. On the circular base of the monument, it is surrounded by two layers, inner and outer, with openings on all sides, resembling a battlement-like wall circle. The inner circle is 12.3 meters in diameter and the outer circle is 27 meters in diameter, signifying the time when the Fourth Red Front Army liberated Ba Cheng and established the Soviet Government in Tongjiang for the first time, January 23 and February 7, 1933, respectively. The wall is 1.8 meters high, with 268 black granite slabs on the inside and outside, engraved with the names of more than 100,000 Red Army martyrs at the provincial, local, military, divisional, and regimental levels. 1,124 divisional and regimental martyrs died from 1927 to 1937, 6,830 West Road Army, lost Red Army and Red Army in the countryside, 220 famous female Red Army, more than 90,000 Red Army martyrs from 20 counties and cities, and 32,000 Red Army martyrs from EYUAN. 32,000 people. The four sides of the monument are affixed with 0.3m large titanium letters, which were inscribed by Major General Li Zhen, the former deputy political commissar of the General Headquarters, and General Zhang Zhijian, the then political commissar of the Chengdu Military Region, and the entire body of the monument is affixed with black granite, and the bottom is engraved with the inscriptions of 12 senior generals such as Geng Biao, Luo Qingchang and Wang Ping, and the list of the Red Army in various periods and the order of the monument.

== Liu Bojian Martyr Statue Garden ==
Liu Bojian (1895–1935), a native of Pingchang, Sichuan, graduated from the Oriental Labor University in Moscow.

In 1921, he and Zhou Enlai initiated the organization of the Communist Youth League of China; in 1922, he became a member of the Chinese Communist Party (CCP); in 1928, he was sent to the Soviet Union to study military affairs and attended the 6th National Congress of the Chinese Communist Party; at the end of 1931, he participated in leading the Ningdu Uprising; in March 1935, he was unfortunately wounded and arrested while leading his troops to break out of the siege, and died in a heroic death on March 21, 1935. Liu Bojian was the deputy head of the General Political Department of the Second Group Army of the Nationalist Army, director of the Political Department of the Soviet Workers' and Peasants' Red Army School, director of the Political Department of the 5th Red Army Corps, deputy head of the Propaganda Department of the General Political Department of the Military Commission of the Chinese Revolutionary Army, etc. He wrote poems such as "Walking with Shackles", "Moving to Prison" and "Moonlight Night in Prison", etc. On February 9, 2011, Liu Bojan was named one of the "Double Hundred" Communist Party Members among the Characters.

The Liu Bojian Martyr Statue Garden is located 85 meters in front of the Yingming Monument. Standing 36 meters long and 24 meters wide in the Ginkgo Forest Garden, the statue of the martyr is a full-body statue made of red granite and is 3 meters high. The statue is shaped according to the portrait of the martyr before his death. Dressed in a suit, lined with a vest, and tied with a tie, he stands on the top of the mountains, holding a book in his left hand, his right hand in his trousers pocket, and his eyes staring into the distance. It symbolizes the martyrs' adherence to the study of Marxism–Leninism, their firm commitment to the revolutionary road, and their lofty revolutionary aspirations and firm revolutionary beliefs. The front is engraved with the five characters "Martyr Liu Bojian" written by Comrade Deng Xiaoping, and the back is engraved with a brief introduction to the life of the martyr. From here, you can not only witness the heroic appearance and sculpture art of the martyrs but also appreciate the style and connotation of the handwriting of the great men.

== General Wu Ruilin Memorial Garden ==
General Wu Ruilin Memorial Statue Garden is located at the east of the top of Nannique Mountain, behind the Monument Promenade. It was built in 1995, and its children and relatives requested the municipal government in 2013 to improve and renovate the General's Memorial Garden to carry out worship activities on the occasion of General Wu Ruilin's centennial birthday. After the municipal party committee and the municipal government decided to include the General Wu Ruilin Memorial Park renovation and expansion project in the Sichuan-Shaanxi Soviet Region General Monument Forest renovation and expansion project, which was funded by the government, the project was officially launched in June 2015 and completed at the end of September. At present, General Wu Ruilin Memorial Statue Park covers an area of 0.58 mu, with a greening area of about 0.15 mu.

== Red Army Monument ==
The Red Army Monument, built to commemorate and promote the spirit of the Red Army and glorify its great performance, is located to the north of the General Monument Forest, which stands at the top of the hill at the Indian Box Stone. It is the highest building among the buildings of the monument forest. The monument is a square trapezoidal pedestal body with a height of 23.92 meters, a side length of 6.6 meters at the bottom, and a side length of 1.2 meters at the top. The square base has a side length of 10 meters and is 1 meter high. The ladder steps up and down from all four sides are 1.5 meters long, and the railing of the ladder belt and the lapis lazuli railing on all four sides of the base is 1 meter high. At the top of the monument is a leaping stainless steel stallion, symbolizing the People's Liberation Army as a brave and invincible revolutionary army.

== Couplets Promenade ==
The four characters "Couple Corridor" were written by Bazhong Jin literati. It is located on the two-level platform between the "Red Army Soldiers' Famous Monument" and the third-phase "Steel Forest Promenade". The audience is 508 meters. Yinglian has selected 1,000 engraved pieces from more than 10,000 pieces written and written by more than 3,000 couplets across the country.

== Sign monument ==
The sign monument is located in the encirclement of the Forest of Monuments Promenade. 7.5 meters high, the monument is in the form of a Mitsubishi hexahedron shuttle. There is a torch on the top, which means that the fire of the revolution is still burning.

The first and second sides are composed of the name of the monument inscribed by General Zhang Aiping "Sichuan-Shaanxi Soviet Area General's Stele Forest" and the flag of the Red Fourth Front Army; the third and fourth sides are inscribed by General Secretary Jiang Zemin: "Long March · Monument Forever" and Mao Zedong's evaluation of the Sichuan-Shaanxi Revolutionary Base: "The Sichuan-Shaanxi Soviet area is the second largest area of the Chinese Soviet Republic"; the fifth and sixth sides are the "Road Map of the Battle Course of the Fourth Red Army" (1927–1937), which includes starting from Qiliping to northern Sichuan to establish the Sichuan-Shaanxi revolutionary base and The journey from the Red Army's Long March to Xingxingxia in 1935.

== Observation deck ==
The observation deck is located to the west of the "Memorial Statue Garden". The Deformation Archway stands on a soil platform with a height of 6 meters, a length of 18 meters, and a width of 7.5 meters. The shape of the deformed archway, the cylinders on both sides of the middle door, are composed of four pieces 0.5 m wide, 0.12 m thick, and 6.5 meters high, with a distance of 0.8 m between the pieces. Each piece is decorated and connected by 3 prefabricated pipes with a diameter of 0.08 m and a length of 0.1 m. It consists of a penetrating column with a real width of 0.72 m and a thickness of 0.5 m. The upper part is horizontally connected by two prefabricated boards with a width of 0.5 m and a thickness of 0.1 m, forming a middle door with a height of 4 meters and a distance of 0.8 m between the upper and lower boards. On both sides are 0.5 m × 0.5 m (1 ft 8 in × 1 ft 8 in) square columns, and the side columns are 5.5 meters high and are connected to the central door column by two prefabricated S-shaped piers with a width of 0.3 m and a thickness of 0.1 m. The column ends are inclined.

== Red Army Soul ==
The "Soul of the Red Army" is located in the middle of the Beilin Garden, on the north side of the Liu Bojian Martyr Statue Garden. The designer adopts the artistic conception of abstraction, generalization and backlight projection, the creativity of combining movement and stillness, and it is shaped by the method of appearing and not appearing.

The sculpture "Soul of the Red Army" was built by Zhao Xinping, the grandson of Zhao Mingxing, an old Red Army member from Tongjiang and the director of the Seventh Engineering Division of Beijing Tianhua Fourth Company, with a donation of 50,000 yuan. It is like a mountain but not a mountain, like a scene but not a scene, like a sculpture of a man and a horse instead of a man and a horse. It is a combination of abstraction and imagination, movement and stillness, and is built by means of backlight projection. The Red Army is the predecessor of the Chinese People's Liberation Army. Meaning: "Army" is a people's army that is brave, invincible, and invincible. The "soul" is not only the soul of the soldier, but also the soul of the army, the "soul" that determines the outcome of the war. It expresses people's infinite admiration and grief for the Red Army soldiers who sacrificed their lives for the country and made indestructible contributions. It symbolizes that this army is the strong pillar of the People's Republic of China and the steel Great Wall that defends the motherland.

== Red Army Cemetery ==
The Red Army Cemetery is located at the mountain bay at the southern end of the Forest of Steles Corridor. Like a large chair, the tombs are all in it. The tomb is made of 0.5 m thick red granite slabs inlaid into double holes 0.5 by 0.5 metres (1 ft 8 in × 1 ft 8 in) in size, with a total length of 1.1 meters, a width of 0.6 meters and a height of 0.5 meters. Double cover. The outer cover is 1.2 meters long, 0.7 meters wide and 0.2 meters thick. A sloped surface with a low front and a high back.

== Memorial Red Army Donation Wall ==
Donation Wall, located in the middle of the park. The wall is made of about 1.5 meters of local bluestone. The wall is 3.5 meters high and about 100 meters long. Each stone is engraved with the units dedicated to the forest of generals, the names of the relatives of the Red Army and the poems commemorating the Red Army, which is to show that people love the Red Army, a tribute to the dedication of the Red Army.

== Red group carving ==
Red historical events as a group theme, set up in the scenic area "to defend the red zone, the north to resist the Japanese, the red Chuan, the division of Davy, women heroes" group sculpture five sculptures. The group sculpture is large, and to coordinate with the overall landscape, the five groups of sculptures are scattered in various parts of the scenic area.
