= Balling Terrace =

Tourist attraction in Bazhong City, Sichuan, China

Balingtai is a tourist attraction located in Pingchang County, Bazhong City, Sichuan, China. It covers an area of 108 square kilometers. Balingtai is also known as Balingzhai.

== Attractions ==
There are 20 attractions in Balingtai:

- Baling Compound
- Bashanbei Erge Group Sculpture
- Beizhai Gate
- Bhikkhu Tombs
- Changning Village
- Dongzhai Gate
- Erlang Hall
- Fengjiaba Pagoda
- Fengjiaba Tombs
- Guanlou
- Lotus Terrace
- Putuo Rock
- Shisanya Compound
- Taoshikan Cliff Statue
- Wu Family Courtyard
- Wujiachang Tomb
- Xieliangpo Tombs
- Xuanzu Temple
- Yaowang Temple
- Zhuyuan Tombs
