= Pingchang County =

Pingchang County 平昌县
- County
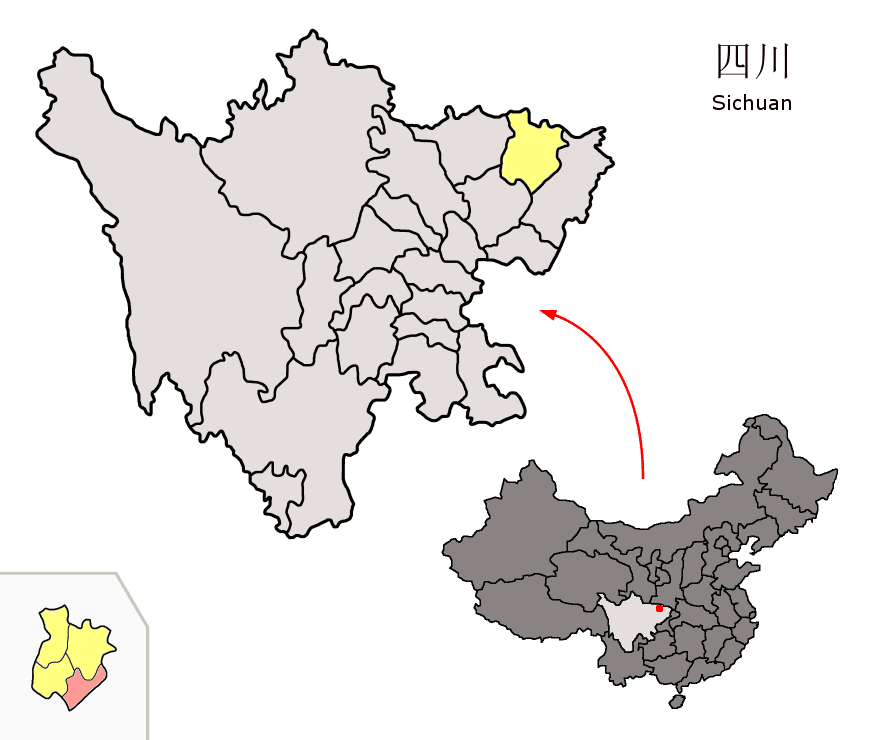
- Location of Pingchang County (red) within Bazhou City (yellow) and Sichuan
- Coordinates: 31°33′38″N 107°06′14″E
- Country: China
- Province: Sichuan
- Prefecture-level city: Bazhong

Area
  - Total: 2,229 km^{2} (861 sq mi)

Population (2020 census)
  - Total: 658,644
  - Density: 295.5/km^{2} (765.3/sq mi)
- Time zone: UTC+8 (China Standard)

Pingchang County
- Traditional Chinese: 平昌縣
- Simplified Chinese: 平昌县
- Literal meaning: Peaceful-&-Prosperous County
Transcriptions
Standard Mandarin
- Hanyu Pinyin: Píngchāng Xiàn

Pingchang County is a county in the northeast of Sichuan province. It is under the administration of the prefecture-level city of Bazhong. Its area is 2,229 km^{2} (861 sq mi). The population is 658,644 (2020 census).

== Administrative divisions ==
Pingchang County comprises 3 subdistricts and 28 towns:

subdistricts

- Tongzhou 同州街道
- Jinbao 金宝街道
- Jiangkou 江口街道

towns

- Xiangtan 响滩镇
- Xixing 西兴镇
- Folou 佛楼镇
- Baiyi 白衣镇
- Hanshui 涵水镇
- Yuejia 岳家镇
- Lancao 兰草镇
- Sima 驷马镇
- Yuanshan 元山镇
- Yuntai 云台镇
- Qiujia 邱家镇
- Bishan 笔山镇
- Zhenlong 镇龙镇
- Desheng 得胜镇
- Lingshan 灵山镇
- Tuxing 土兴镇
- Wangjing 望京镇
- Longgang 龙岗镇
- Banmiao 板庙镇
- Nilong 泥龙镇
- Qingyun 青云镇
- Dazhai 大寨镇
- Tuya 土垭镇
- Si'an 澌岸镇
- Fenbi 粉壁镇
- Sanshi'erliang 三十二梁镇
- Jiangjiakou 江家口镇
- Yankou 岩口镇

== Climate ==
Climate data for Pingchang, elevation 364 m (1,194 ft), (1991–2020 normals, extremes 1981–present)
Month	Jan	Feb	Mar	Apr	May	Jun	Jul	Aug	Sep	Oct	Nov	Dec	Year
Record high °C (°F)	19.2 (66.6)	23.1 (73.6)	31.2 (88.2)	35.1 (95.2)	36.7 (98.1)	36.6 (97.9)	41.0 (105.8)	42.6 (108.7)	39.4 (102.9)	33.6 (92.5)	26.4 (79.5)	17.9 (64.2)	42.6 (108.7)
Mean daily maximum °C (°F)	9.5 (49.1)	12.5 (54.5)	17.7 (63.9)	23.3 (73.9)	26.8 (80.2)	29.5 (85.1)	32.6 (90.7)	32.9 (91.2)	27.3 (81.1)	21.6 (70.9)	16.4 (61.5)	10.6 (51.1)	21.7 (71.1)
Daily mean °C (°F)	5.8 (42.4)	8.2 (46.8)	12.2 (54.0)	17.4 (63.3)	21.2 (70.2)	24.4 (75.9)	27.2 (81.0)	26.9 (80.4)	22.4 (72.3)	17.3 (63.1)	12.4 (54.3)	7.2 (45.0)	16.9 (62.4)
Mean daily minimum °C (°F)	3.4 (38.1)	5.3 (41.5)	8.6 (47.5)	13.4 (56.1)	17.3 (63.1)	21.0 (69.8)	23.5 (74.3)	23.0 (73.4)	19.5 (67.1)	14.9 (58.8)	10.0 (50.0)	5.1 (41.2)	13.8 (56.7)
Record low °C (°F)	−3.1 (26.4)	−1.8 (28.8)	−0.3 (31.5)	4.5 (40.1)	9.0 (48.2)	14.4 (57.9)	16.5 (61.7)	16.2 (61.2)	12.4 (54.3)	1.7 (35.1)	0.9 (33.6)	−3.5 (25.7)	−3.5 (25.7)
Average precipitation mm (inches)	13.5 (0.53)	18.5 (0.73)	39.6 (1.56)	78.0 (3.07)	141.3 (5.56)	183.8 (7.24)	202.0 (7.95)	159.6 (6.28)	165.4 (6.51)	102.7 (4.04)	46.9 (1.85)	15.9 (0.63)	1,167.2 (45.95)
Average precipitation days (≥ 0.1 mm)	8.1	8.2	10.6	12.3	13.6	14.1	13.5	10.9	13.1	14.1	10.2	8.7	137.4
Average snowy days	1.3	0.4	0.1	0	0	0	0	0	0	0	0	0.3	2.1
Average relative humidity (%)	82	79	76	76	77	81	80	78	82	85	85	85	81
Mean monthly sunshine hours	32.4	41.0	86.1	121.2	127.4	120.7	170.7	180.1	98.5	66.4	51.5	33.0	1,129
Percentage possible sunshine	10	13	23	31	30	29	40	44	27	19	17	11	25
Source: China Meteorological Administrationall-time extreme temperatureall-time July high

== Transportation ==
Pingchang railway station on the Bazhong–Dazhou railway is situated here.

== See also ==
- Baiyi Ancient Town
- Balling Terrace
- Buddha Head Mountain
- Sima Water Town
