= Bazhong railway station =

Railway station in Sichuan, China

Bazhong 巴中
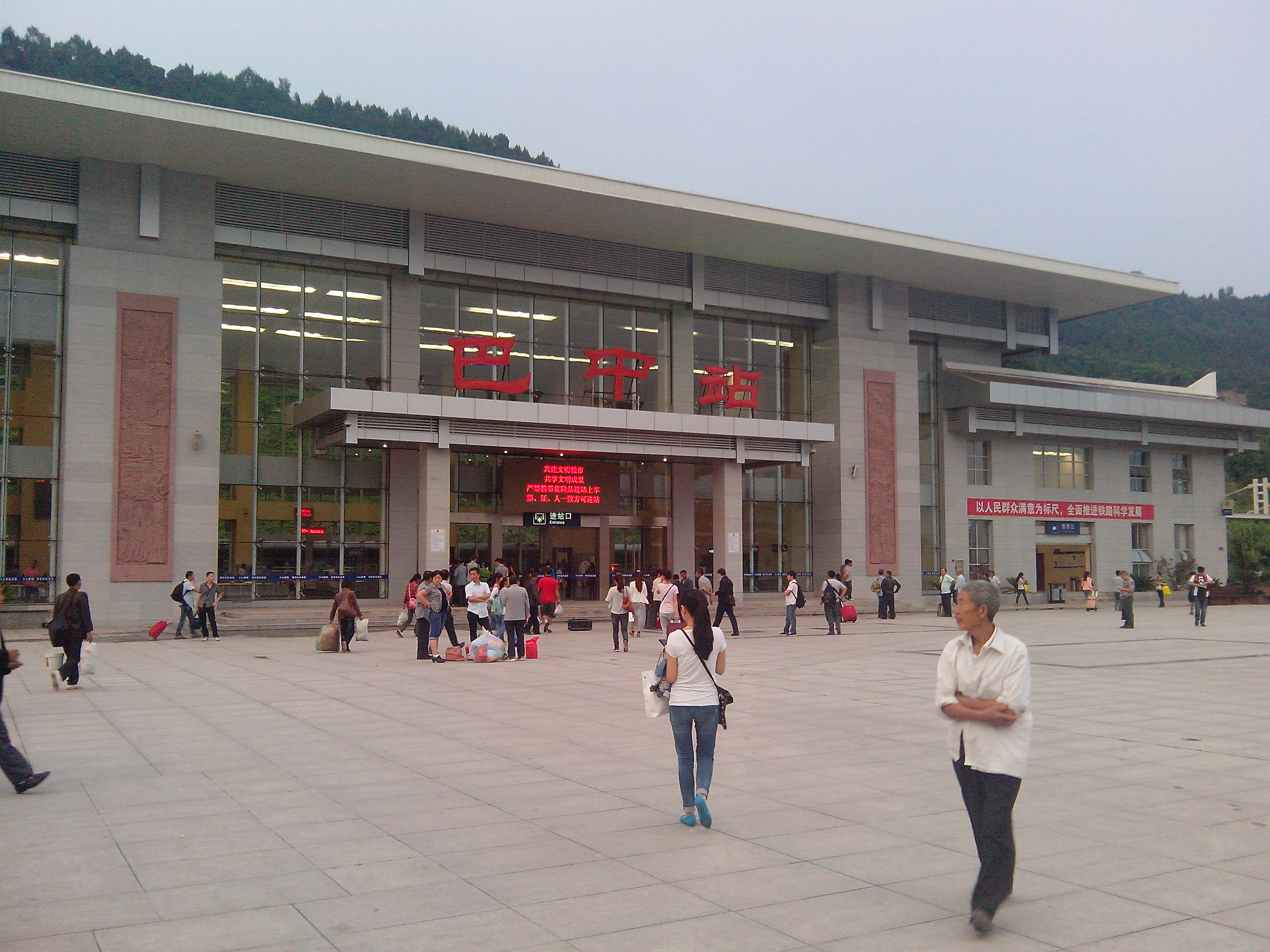

General information
- Location: Bazhou District, Bazhong, Sichuan; China
- Coordinates: 31.876228°N 106.761186°E
- Lines: Guangyuan–Bazhong railway; Bazhong–Dazhou railway
Location

Bazhong railway station (Chinese: 巴中站) is a railway station in Bazhou District, Bazhong, Sichuan, China. It is the southern terminus of the Guangyuan–Bazhong railway and the northern terminus of the Bazhong–Dazhou railway.

== History ==
On 11 January 2016, the Bazhong–Dazhou railway opened. The service provision was a direct service to Chongqing with a journey time of just over five hours, and a direct service to Chengdu with a journey time of approximately 7.5 hours.

On 25 October 2019, the China Railway CR200J "Fuxing" EMU served the station for the first time. The journey time between Bazhong and Chengdu was reduced to five hours.
