= Bazhong Enyang Airport =

Bazhong Enyang Airport 巴中恩阳机场
- IATA: BZX; ICAO: ZUBZ

Summary
- Airport type: Public
- Operator: Jiuzhai Huanglong Airport Company
- Serves: Bazhong, Sichuan, China
- Location: Xinglong Town, Enyang District
- Opened: 3 February 2019; 7 years ago
- Elevation AMSL: 550 m (1,800 ft)
- Coordinates: 31.738°N 106.645°E

Map
- Location of airport in Sichuan

Runways
Direction	Length		Surface
Direction	m	ft	Surface
07/25	2,600	8,530	Concrete

Statistics (2025)
- Passengers: 563,754
- Aircraft movements: 55,306
- Cargo (metric tons): 54.1

Bazhong Enyang Airport
- Simplified Chinese: 巴中恩阳机场
- Traditional Chinese: 巴中恩陽機場
Transcriptions
Standard Mandarin
- Hanyu Pinyin: Bāzhōng Ēnyáng Jīchǎng

Bazhong Enyang Airport (IATA: BZX, ICAO: ZUBZ) is an airport serving the city of Bazhong in China's southwestern Sichuan province. It is located in Xinglong Town, Enyang District, about 31 kilometres (19 mi) by road from the city center.

The airport received approval from the State Council and the Central Military Commission of China on 3 July 2014. Construction began on 5 February 2015, and the airport was opened on 3 February 2019, with an inaugural Sichuan Airlines flight from Chengdu. It is operated by Jiuzhai Huanglong Airport Company.

== History ==
In October 2012, Bazhong officially started preliminary work on the airport. The Bazhong Civil Airport was positioned as a domestic feeder airport, located near Fenghuangmiao Village in Enyang District, 13 kilometers in a straight line and 31 kilometers by road from Bazhong. The construction of the airport began on February 5, 2015, with a total investment of 1.491 billion yuan. The flight area was designed to 4C standards, with a 2600-meter-long and 45-meter-wide runway, and a 183-meter-long and 18-meter-wide perpendicular connecting taxiway. The main landing direction of the runway is equipped with a Category I precision approach instrument landing system (ILS).

The airport completed its calibration flight on September 25, 2018, and successfully completed its test flight on November 28. On February 3, 2019, Sichuan Airlines flight 3U8015 took off from Chengdu and landed at Bazhong Enyang Airport, completing its maiden flight and marking the official opening of the airport.

On November 30, 2020, Bazhong Enyang Airport officially opened its air cargo service.

== Facilities ==
Bazhong Airport is a class 4C airport, with a 2,600-meter runway. It is projected to handle 900,000 passengers annually.

== Airlines and destinations ==
Airlines	Destinations
Air Chang'an	Haikou, Xi'an
Air China	Beijing–Daxing, Chengdu–Shuangliu, Shanghai–Pudong
Air Travel	Wuxi
Beijing Capital Airlines	Qingdao
China Southern Airlines	Guangzhou, Yiwu
Loong Air	Ningbo
Lucky Air	Chengdu-Tianfu, Nanjing
Shenzhen Airlines	Shenzhen
Sichuan Airlines	Jinan, Kunming
Urumqi Air	Quanzhou, Urumqi

== See also ==
- List of airports in China
- List of the busiest airports in China
