= Wenquan, Guangdong =

Wenquan 温泉镇
- Town
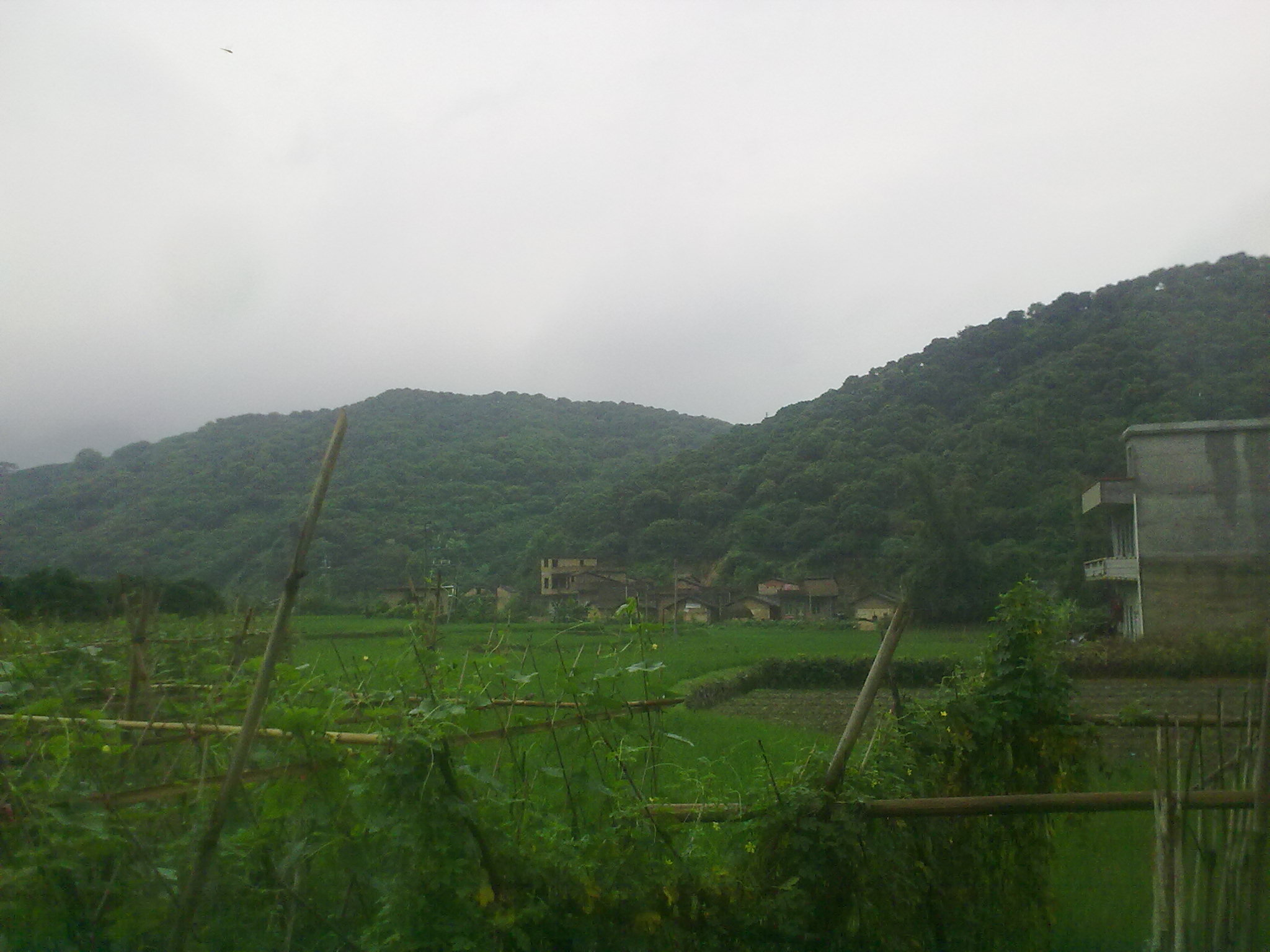
- A rural area in Wenquan

- Location in Guangdong
- Coordinates: 23°37′09″N 113°37′39″E
- Country: People's Republic of China
- Province: Guangdong
- Sub-provincial city: Guangzhou
- District: Conghua
- Village-level divisions: 4 residential communities 22 villages

Area
  - Total: 210.9 km^{2} (81.4 sq mi)
- Elevation: 39 m (128 ft)

Population (2022)
  - Total: 76,000
  - Density: 360/km^{2} (930/sq mi)
- Time zone: UTC+8 (China Standard)

Wenquan (simplified Chinese: 温泉镇; traditional Chinese: 溫泉鎮; pinyin: Wēnquán Zhèn; lit. 'hot springs town') is a town in the district of Conghua, Guangzhou, in central Guangdong province, China, located about 40 km (25 mi) northeast of Guangzhou Baiyun International Airport. As of 2023, it has 4 residential communities (社区) and 22 villages under its administration. The town spans an area of 210.9 square kilometres (81.4 mi^{2}), and per a 2023 government publication, the town has a population of about 76,000.

== Geography ==
About 60% of Wenquan's area is forested.

== Administrative divisions ==
- Longgang Community (Chinese: 龙岗社区)
- Guancun Community (Chinese: 灌村社区)
- Wenquan Hexi Community (Chinese: 温泉河西社区)
- Wenquan Community (Chinese: 温泉社区)
- Wenquan Village (Chinese: 温泉村)
- Tianhu Village (Chinese: 天湖村)
- Weidong Village (Chinese: 卫东村)
- Wushi Village (Chinese: 乌石村)
- Yunxing Village (Chinese: 云星村)
- Xuanxing Village (Chinese: 宣星村)
- Yuanhu Village (Chinese: 源湖村)
- Wutu Village (Chinese: 乌土村)
- Longgang Village (Chinese: 龙岗村)
- Longqiao Village (Chinese: 龙桥村)
- Pinggang Village (Chinese: 平岗村)
- Zhongtian Village (Chinese: 中田村)
- Taolian Village (Chinese: 桃莲村)
- Mishi Village (Chinese: 密石村)
- Shihai Village (Chinese: 石海村)
- Shinan Village (Chinese: 石南村)
- Nanxing Village (Chinese: 南星村)
- Xintian Village (Chinese: 新田村)
- Longxin Village (Chinese: 龙新村)
- Xinnan Village (Chinese: 新南村)
- Nanping Village (Chinese: 南平村)
- Shikeng Village (Chinese: 石坑村)

== Demographics ==
Per a 2023 government publication, the town has a population of about 76,000, comprising 48,000 permanent residents, and a floating population of 28,000.

== Economy ==
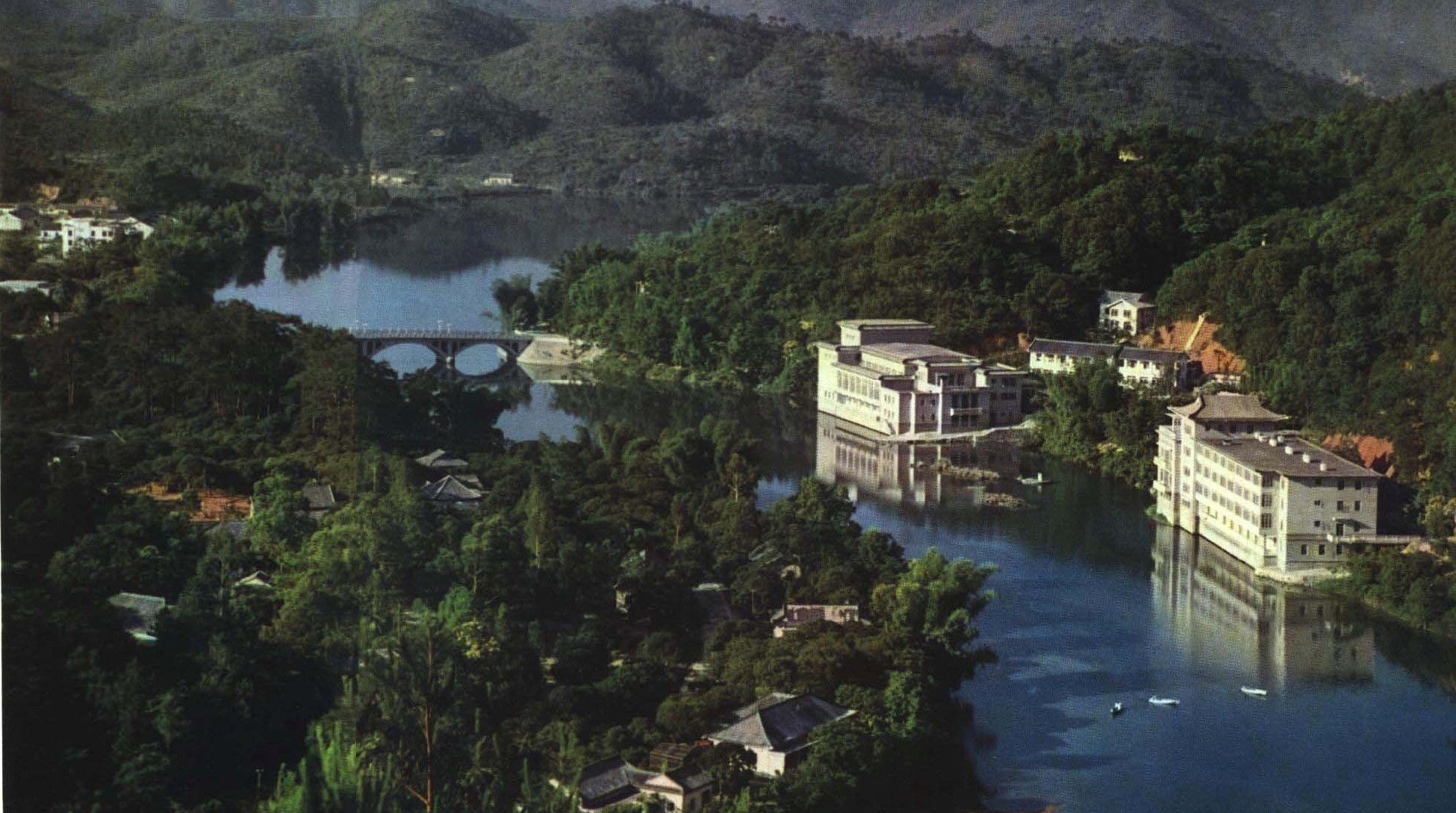
An aerial shot of Wenquan from August 1964

Wenquan, which literally translates to "hot springs", is home to a number of hot springs, and has a sizable tourism sector. The town is home to 80 hotels, which contain more than 6,000 hotel rooms.

Manufacturing is also a sizable portion of the town's economy, and major industries include motorcycle manufacturing, plastic manufacturing, wood processing, non-woven fabric manufacturing, metal products manufacturing, and pharmaceutical production.

== Education ==
The town of Wenquan is home to one higher education institute: Nanfang College Guangzhou. The town is also some to an adult education school, two secondary schools, six primary schools, and three kindergartens.

== Healthcare ==
Wenquan is home to two hospitals.

== Transportation ==
China National Highway 105 runs through Wenquan, as does Guangdong Provincial Route 355.

== See also ==
- List of township-level divisions of Guangdong
