= Thousand Buddha Rock =

Historic site in Sichuan, China

Coordinates: 29.7497900°N 103.5470900°E

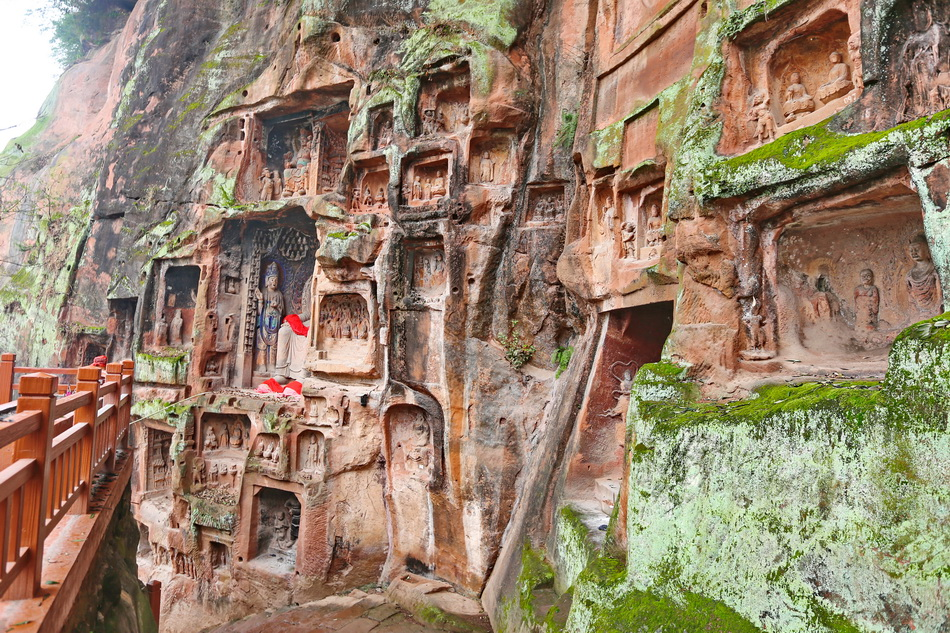

Thousand Buddha Rock (Chinese: 夾江千佛岩) is a rock in Renshou County, Sichuan. It has over 21 different Buddhist carvings. Many of the carvings were first made around the year 881 during the Tang dynasty, with work extending into the Qing dynasty. Previously some of these carvings were covered by the Qingyi River until exposed by the rising global temperatures. The condition of the carvings has suffered due to vandalism and neglect. The tallest Buddha is 2.7 m high.

== See also ==
- Leshan Giant Buddha
- Renshou Giant Buddha
- Southern Cliff Buddhist Sculptures
