= Yueyuan Animal Breeding Farm =

Monkey farm facility in Guangzhou, China

The Conghua City Yueyuan Animal Breeding farm (Chinese: 从化市棋杆镇悦源动物养殖场) is a monkey breeding facility built in Qigan Town, Conghua District, Guangzhou, People's Republic of China. It houses monkeys to be sold internationally for scientific research.

== History ==
The farm was built in 2000, with the breeding stocks of monkeys imported from Cambodia. Mainland China now has 39 such farms. Official figures put the 2008 number of monkeys licensed for export at 170,000. The monkey farm is now the biggest in the world, housing 50,000 primates. The monkeys are used scientific research, including gene therapy, cancer, Parkinson's, Alzheimer's, stem cells and antibody-based treatments.

== Customer ==
The United States is reported to be the biggest overseas customers. Other customers include South Korea and Germany. Shirley McGreal, director of the International Primate Protection League (IPPL), said that the United States Department of Defense is one of the biggest client using the monkeys in biological warfare weapons research: the monkeys are poisoned with sarin, anthrax, ebola during experimentation.

The price for a healthy and pathogen-free monkey is between US$2,000 and US$3,000 each.
