= Conghua Coach Terminal station =

Metro station in Guangzhou, China

Conghua Coach Terminal 从化客运站
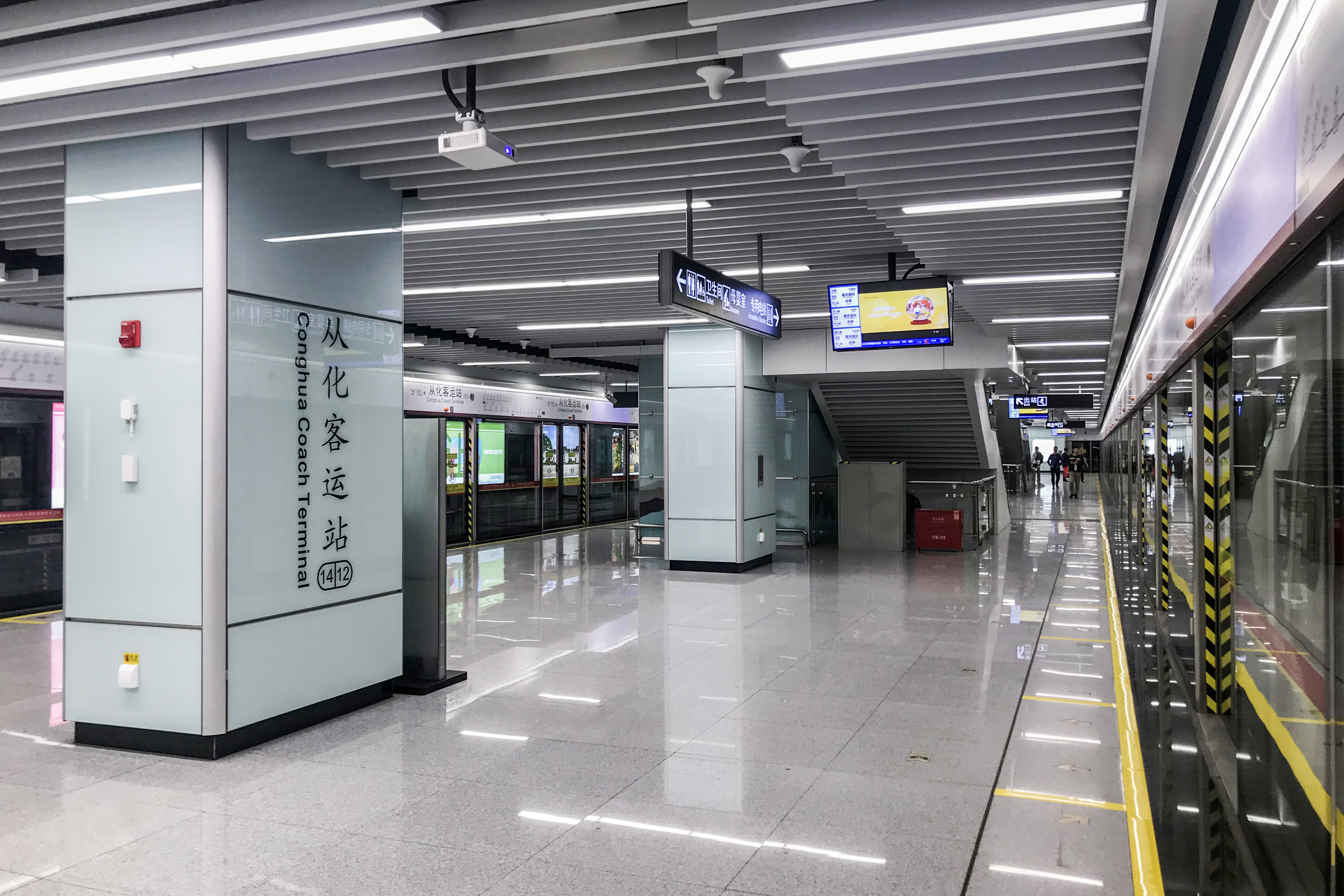
- Platform

Chinese name
- Simplified Chinese: 从化客运站
- Traditional Chinese: 從化客運站
Transcriptions
Standard Mandarin
- Hanyu Pinyin: Cónghuàkèyùn Zhàn
Yue: Cantonese
- Jyutping: cung^{4}faa^{3}haak^{3}wan^{6} zaam^{6}

General information
- Location: Congcheng Avenue, Conghua Avenue, Conghua District, Guangzhou, Guangdong; China
- Coordinates: 23.53444°N 113.5897°E
- Operated by: Guangzhou Metro Co. Ltd.
- Line: Line 14
- Platforms: 2 (1 island platform)
- Tracks: 2

Construction
- Structure type: Underground
- Accessible: Yes

Other information
- Station code: 1420

History
- Opened: 28 December 2018; 7 years ago

Services
Preceding station	Guangzhou Metro	Following station
Chicao towards Lejia Road	Line 14	Dongfeng Terminus
Xinhe towards Lejia Road	Line 14 Express	Dongfeng Terminus
Location

Conghua Coach Terminal station (Chinese: 从化客运站) is a station of Line 14 of the Guangzhou Metro. It opened on 28 December 2018.

== Station layout ==
The station has an underground island platform. Platform 1 is for trains heading to Dongfeng, whilst platform 2 is for trains heading to Lejia Road.

== Gallery ==
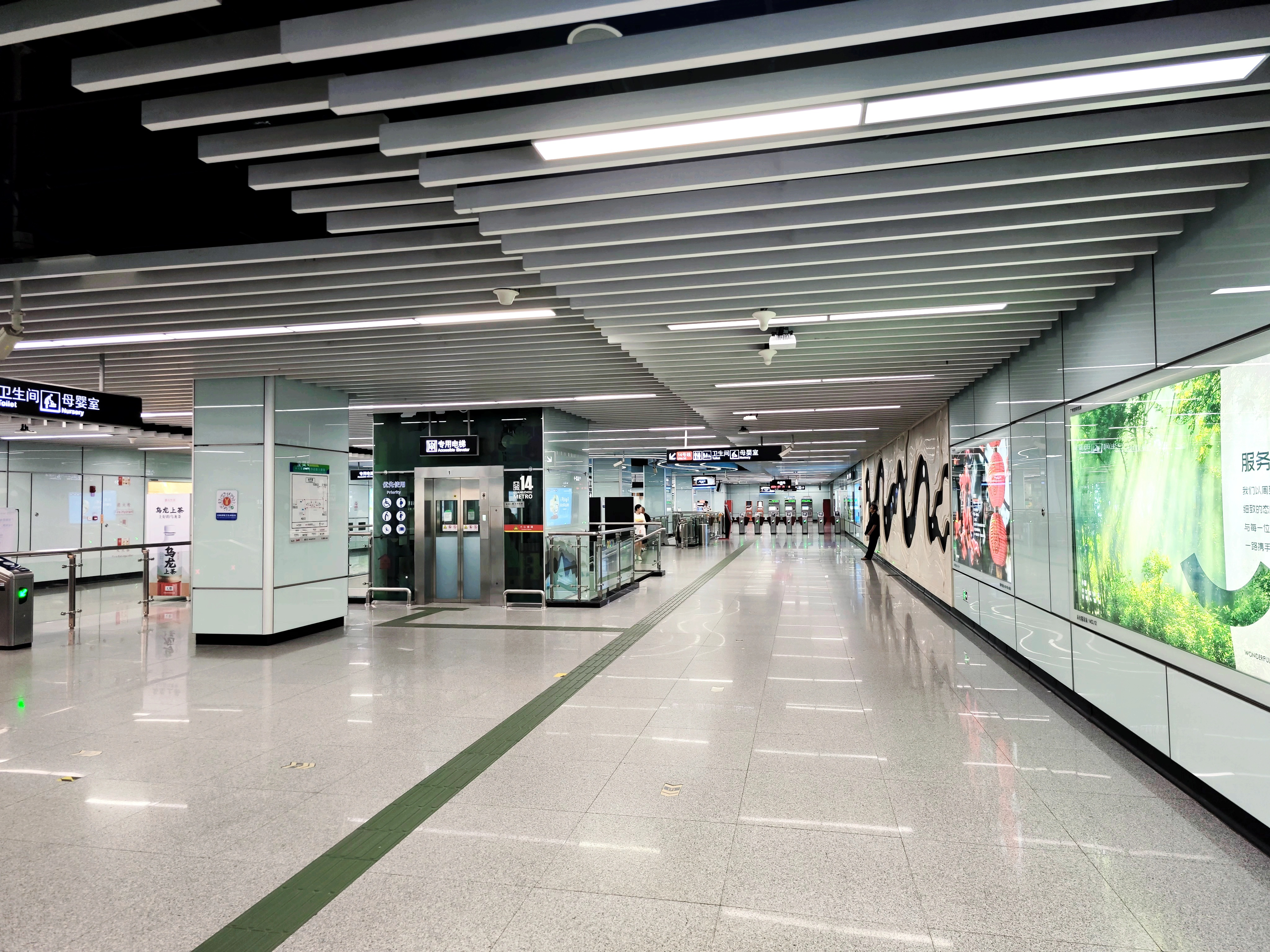
Concourse

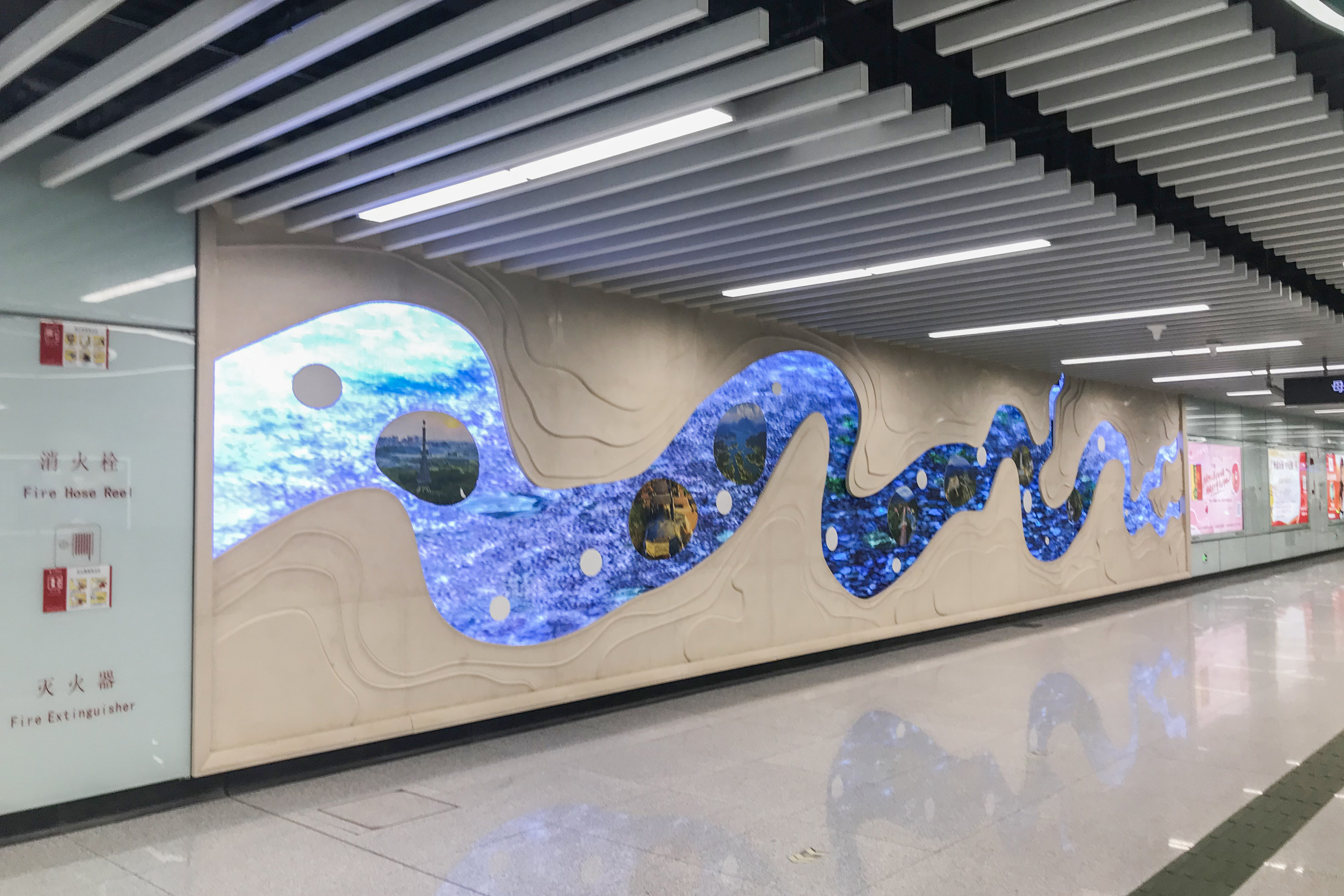
Concourse culture wall

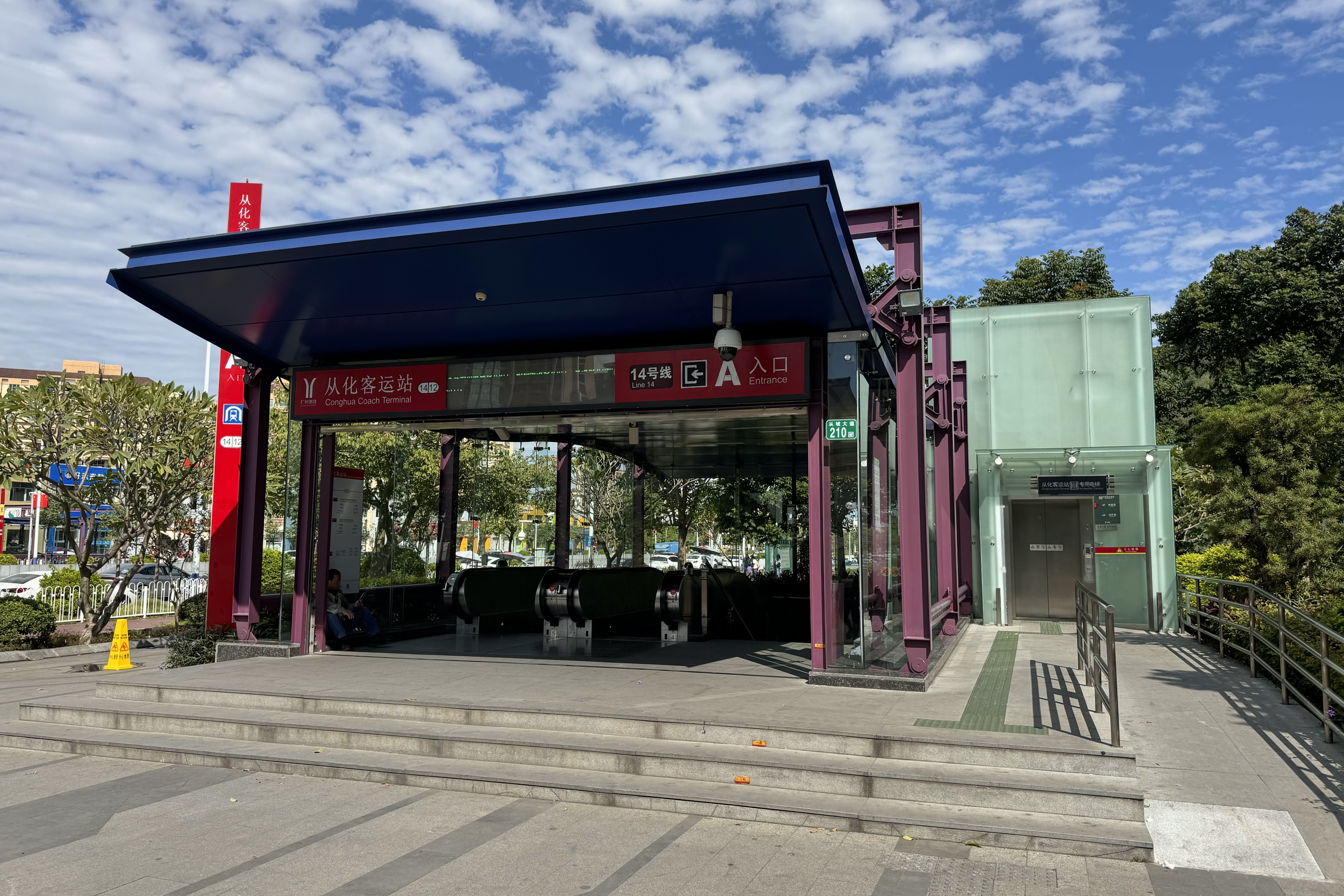
Exit A

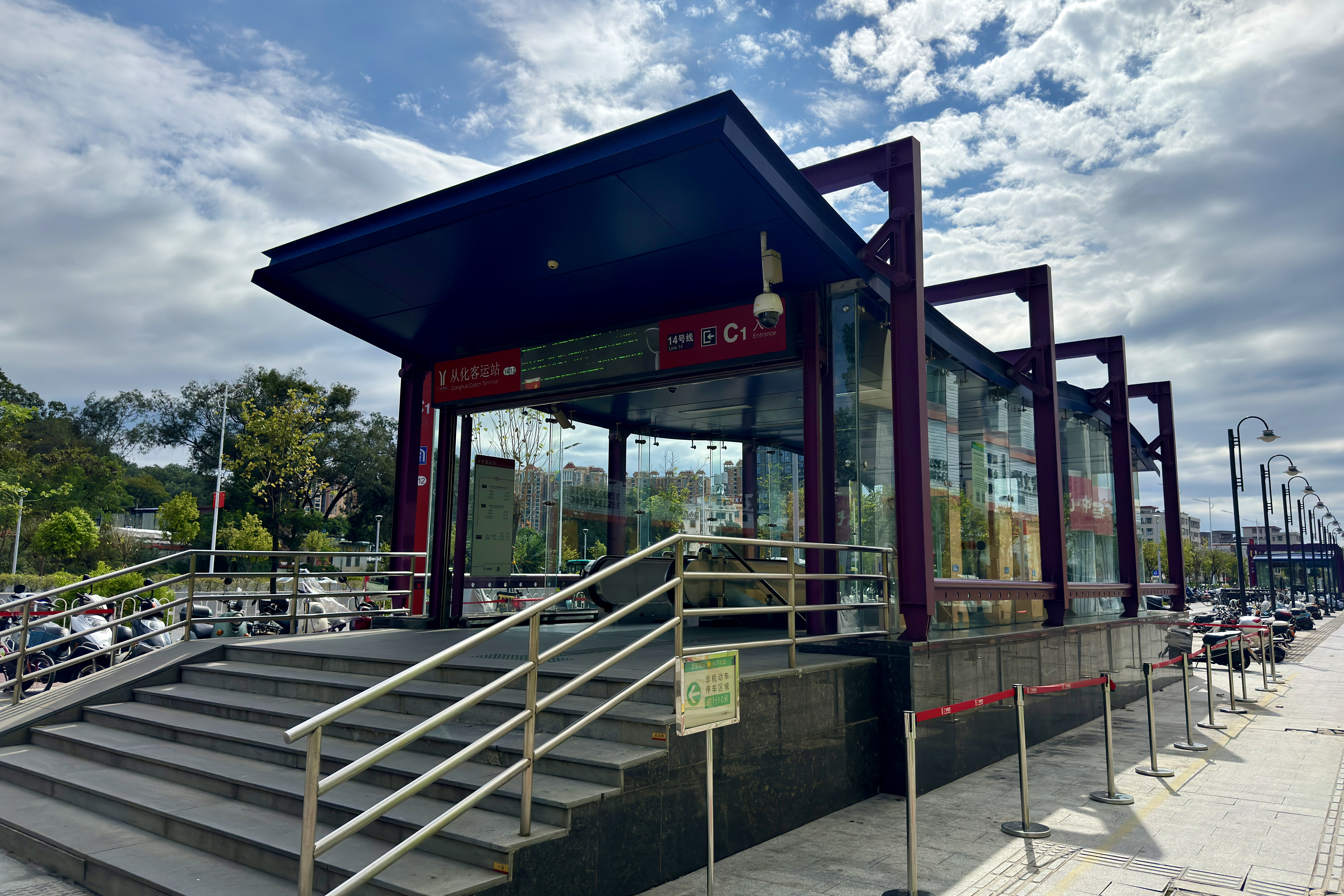
Exit C1

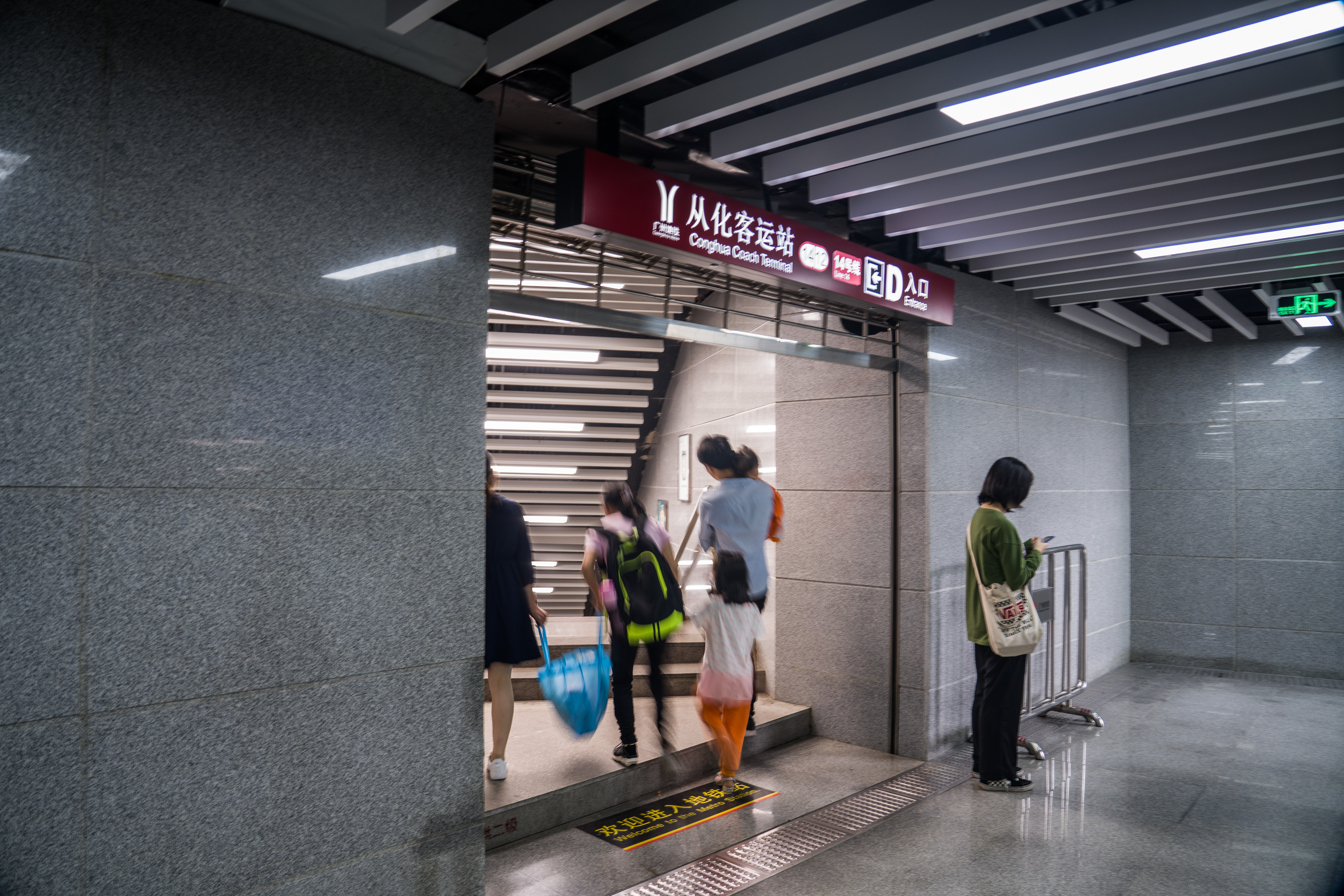
Exit D
