= Southern Cliff Buddhist Sculptures =

Buddhist site in Bazhong, Sichuan, China

Coordinates: 31°50′45″N 106°45′20″E

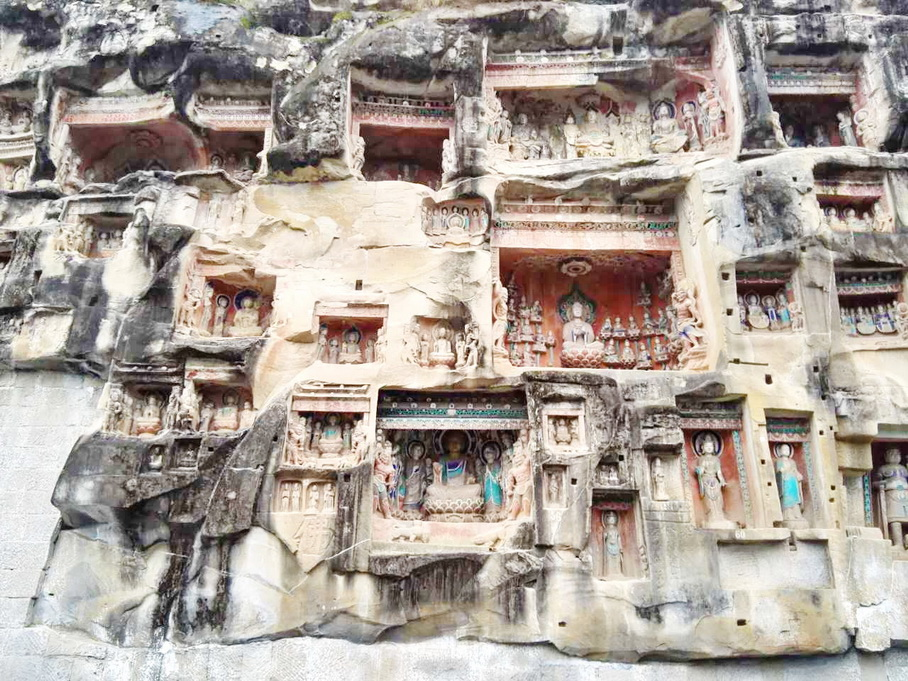
Southern Cliff sculptures

The Southern Cliff Buddhist Sculptures (traditional Chinese: 南龕摩崖造像; simplified Chinese: 南龛摩崖造像; pinyin: Nánkān móyá zàoxiàng), also known as Nankan Grottoes (南龕石窟; 南龛石窟; Nánkān shíkū), is a tourist attraction in Bazhong, Sichuan, China. The site is known for its 179 carved grottos which house almost 2,700 painted Buddhist statues. It is located 1 km (0.62 mi) south of Bazhong city proper, and is part of the greater Nankan Mountain Scenic Area.

== Description ==
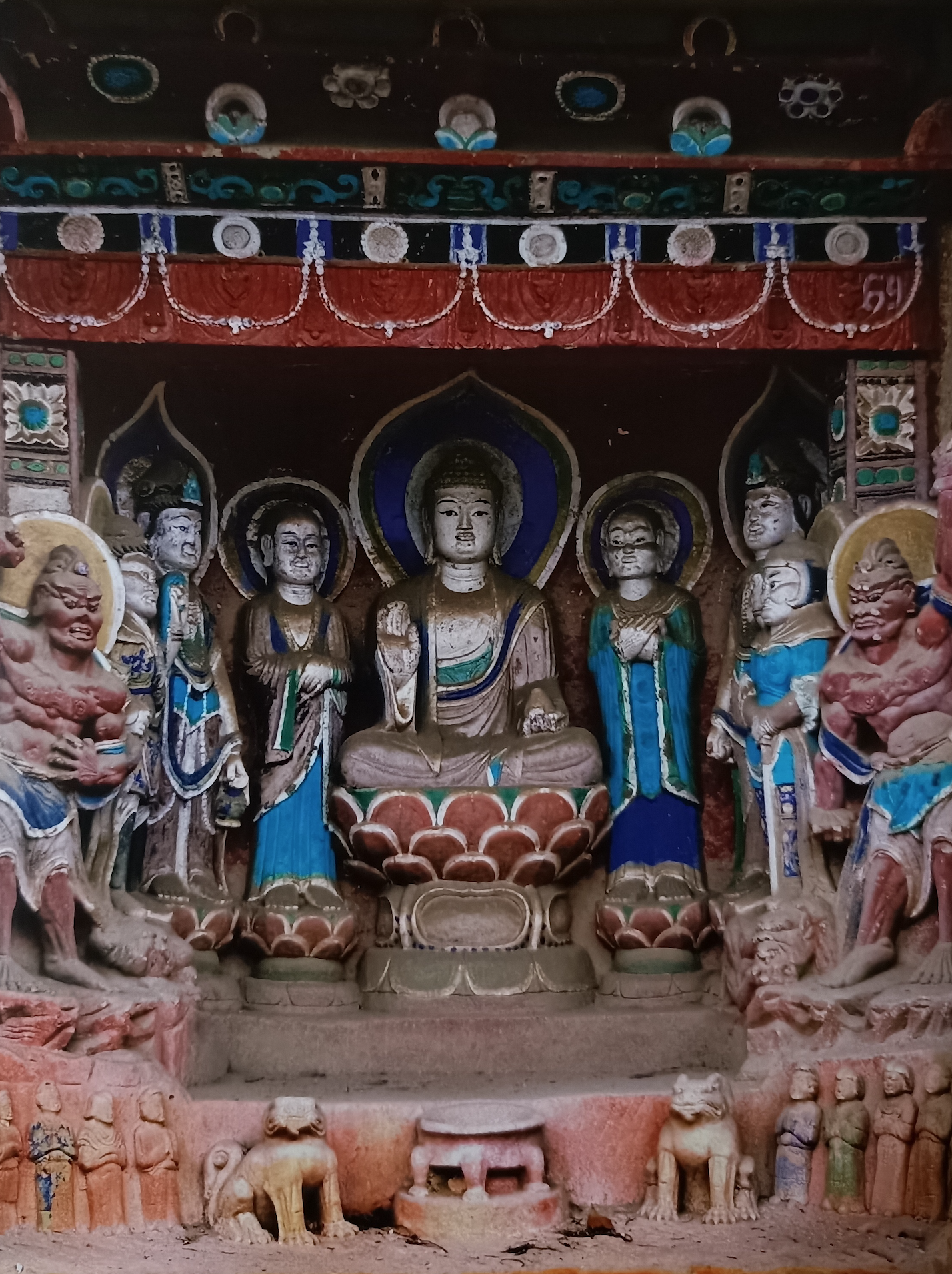
Sermon of Sakyamuni Buddha, Niche 69, 740 AD.

The Southern Cliff caves form the largest and best-preserved grottoes in Bazhong, with the existing 179 niche caves. Nannan Mountain is slightly north–south, and the statues are mainly distributed on the east side of several walls, such as Shenxianpo, Yunping stone, and Guanyin Rock, to the east of the Shenxianpo cliff. When the survey was conducted in the summer of 2000, for the convenience of the record, Shenxianpo was divided into two sections in the north and south, and the northern section was the most intensive section of the statue, to facilitate the recording of the original climbing road after Laojun Cave. The present Guanyin Road is located on the east side of the cliff, from the bottom to the top straight to the northern section of the Buddha statue area in front of the cliff, with the Yunping Stone on the south side and the Sky Fall Stone on the north side, the Guanyin Cliff is located under the north slope of the northern section, and the tomb tower area is located at the south end of the cliff. The numbering of the statue area starts from the Yunping stone at the lower end of the cliff to the Tianlv stone in the southern section of the cliff wall of the main statue area and ends at the Guanyin cliff, and each numbering is done in the order from top to bottom and from south to north. The numbering of the tomb tower area follows the Guanyin Cliff numbering, from north to south and from top to bottom. Nos. 151-153 are located on the roadside of the statue area leading to the tomb and tower area, so they were numbered afterward. Nos. 174-176 are newly discovered in the survey and are supplementary numbers. Niches 027 to 138 are mainly concentrated in the northern section, the main statue area; niches 139 to 150 are located in Guanyin Rock; niches 012 to 026 and 174 to 176 are in the area of Laojun Cave in the southern section; niches 154 172 to 172 are located in the tomb tower area in the southern section; niches 001 to 008 and 15l are located on the Yunping Stone in front of the mountain; and niches 009 to 011 are located on the Tianmen Stone. The remnant niche to the left of the original 101 niches is a duplicate of 102 niches. Most of the south niche statues were excavated in the Tang dynasty. According to its cliff face, combined with the generations of statue inscriptions, according to the order of excavation, the existing important inscriptions and representative niches of the Southern Cliff can be roughly divided into eight groups.

== Double-headed Buddha ==
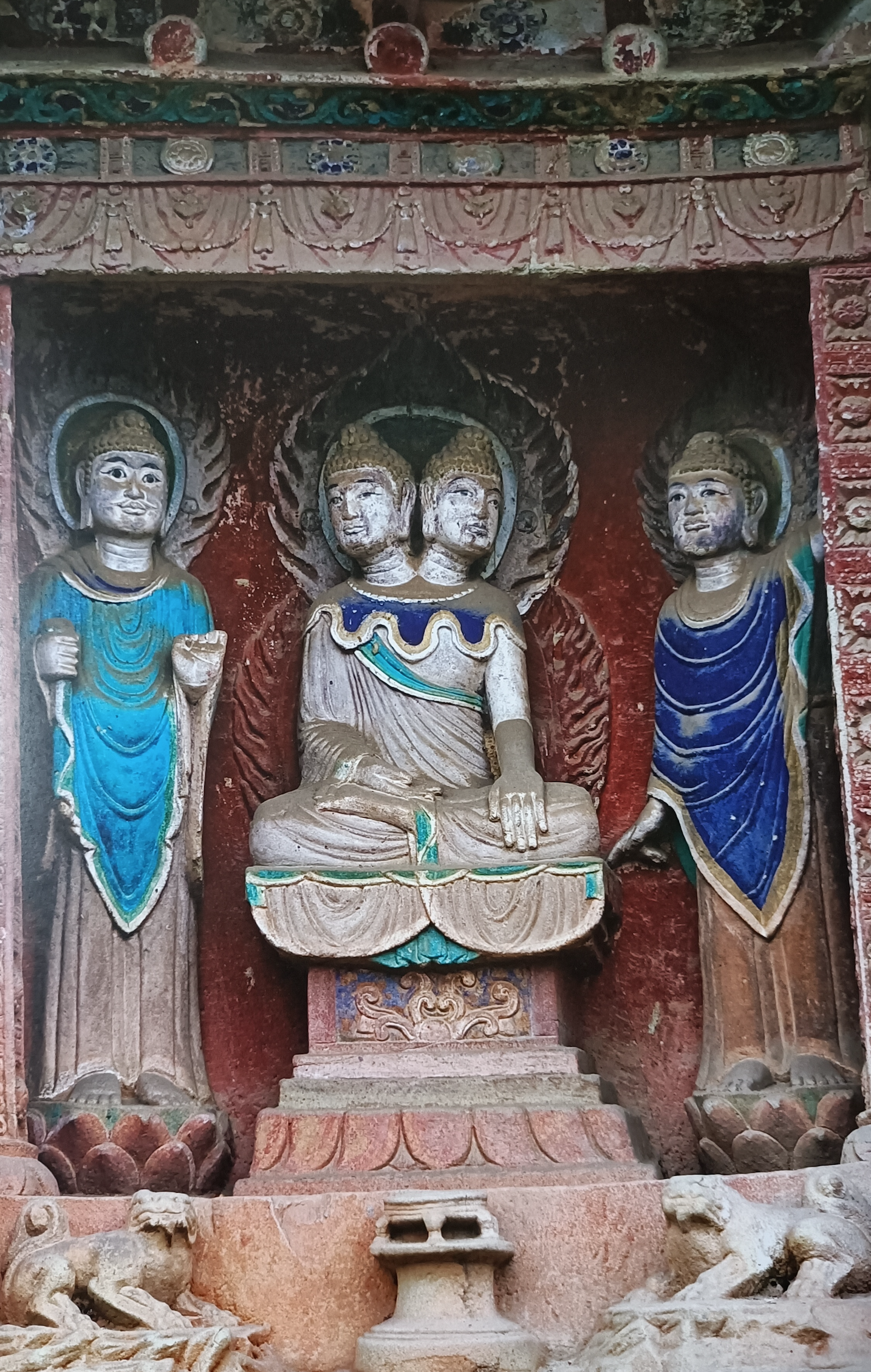
Double-headed Buddha, Niche 83, 8th century.

One peculiar image at the Southern Cliff is a double-headed Buddha as the central figure displayed in Niche 83. This image represents a seated Buddha performing a reversed bhūmisparśa mudrā, i.e., his left hand, instead of the right, touches the ground. The two attending Buddhas are shown standing, one of them pointing with his left hand to the sky, and his right hand to the ground. The other is shown keeping both hands at chest level without performing any gesture. All three are given fiery haloes, the double-headed Buddha an additional fiery aureola. According to Professor Angela Falco Howard, their garments are also unorthodox: "Namely, the scalloped capelet worn by the central image, and the outer robe worn by the lateral Buddhas. Perhaps in this niche were gathered three of a series of famous images from sacred places in India, which are represented in painting at Dunhuang. These are very rare sculptural interpretations of the famous Indian images."

According to Dr. Lei Yuhua, an associate researcher at the Archaeological Institute of Chengdu, "The popularity of the cult of the double-headed Buddha was limited to Xinjiang and Hexi Corridor region. The appearance of his image in Bazhong is a clear proof of a historical tie between Sichuan and the Western Regions."

== History and its origin ==
The carving began in the Sui dynasty, and lasted in the Tang period, along with Song up to the Republican Era.

== See also ==
- Thousand Buddha Rock
