= Enyang, Bazhong =

Enyang 恩阳区
- District
- Location in Sichuan
- Coordinates: 31.787°N 106.654°E
- Country: China
- Province: Sichuan
- Prefecture-level city: Bazhong
- Established: January 2013
- District seat: Enyang Town

Area
  - Total: 1,156 km^{2} (446 sq mi)

Population (2020 census)
  - Total: 345,728
  - Density: 299.1/km^{2} (774.6/sq mi)
- Time zone: UTC+8 (China Standard Time)
- Division code: EYG

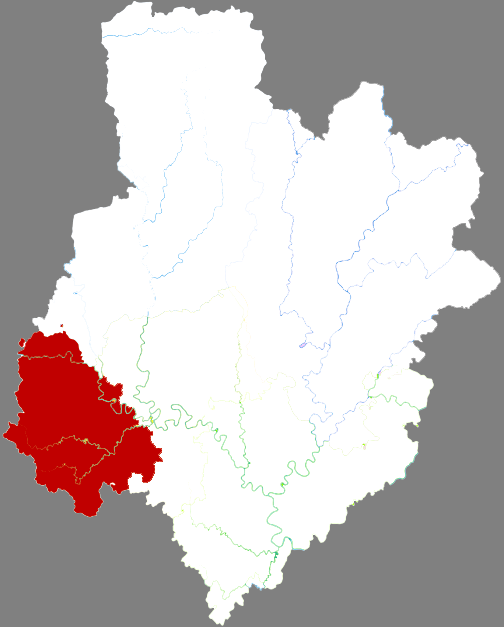
Location of Enyang District in Bazhong City, China

Enyang District (simplified Chinese: 恩阳区; traditional Chinese: 恩陽區; pinyin: Ēnyáng Qū) is a district of the prefecture-level city of Bazhong in Sichuan province, China. It was created in January 2013 by splitting off 12 towns and 12 townships from Bazhou District. It governs an area of 1,000 square kilometres (390 sq mi) and has a population of 345,728 (2020 census). The seat of the district is at Mingyang Town (formerly Enyang Town).

== Administrative divisions ==
Enyang District is divided into 3 subdistricts and 15 towns:

subdistricts

- Dengke 登科街道
- Wenzhi 文治街道
- Sicheng 司城街道

towns

- Mingyang 明阳镇
- Yushan 玉山镇
- Yuxi 渔溪镇
- Huacong 花丛镇
- Liulin 柳林镇
- Xiabamiao 下八庙镇
- Chaba 茶坝镇
- Shangbamiao 上八庙镇
- Guangong 关公镇
- Xinglong 兴隆镇
- Shuangsheng 双胜镇
- Qunle 群乐镇
- Yinjia 尹家镇
- Jiu 九镇
- Xueshan 雪山镇
