= Bazhou, Bazhong =

Bazhou 巴州区
- District
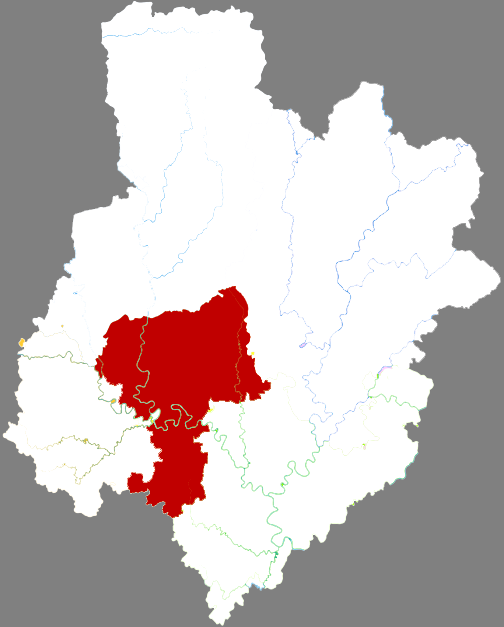

- Location in Sichuan
- Coordinates (Bazhou District government): 31°51′05″N 106°46′08″E
- Country: China
- Province: Sichuan
- Prefecture-level city: Bazhong
- District seat: Dongcheng Subdistrict

Area
  - Total: 1,359 km^{2} (525 sq mi)
- Elevation: 392 m (1,286 ft)

Population (2020 census)
  - Total: 651,534
  - Density: 479.4/km^{2} (1,242/sq mi)
- Time zone: UTC+8 (China Standard)
- Postal code: 636600
- Area code: 0827
- Website: www.bzqzf.gov.cn

Bazhou (Chinese: 巴州; pinyin: Bāzhōu) is a district and the seat of Bazhong City, Sichuan Province, China.

== Administrative divisions ==
Bazhou District administers 9 subdistricts, 14 towns, and 2 townships:

- Dongcheng Subdistrict (东城街道)
- Xicheng Subdistrict (西城街道)
- Huifeng Subdistrict (回风街道)
- Jiangbei Subdistrict (江北街道)
- Dangliang Subdistrict (宕梁街道)
- Yutang Subdistrict (玉堂街道)
- Xingwen Subdistrict (兴文街道)
- Qizhang Subdistrict (奇章街道)
- Shixin Subdistrict (时新街道)
- Damaoping Town (大茅坪镇)
- Qingjiang Town (清江镇)
- Shuiningsi Town (水宁寺镇)
- Huacheng Town (化成镇)
- Zengkou Town (曾口镇)
- Liangyong Town (梁永镇)
- Sanjiang Town (三江镇)
- Dingshan Town (鼎山镇)
- Daluo Town (大罗镇)
- Zaolin Town (枣林镇)
- Pingliang Town (平梁镇)
- Guanghui Town (光辉镇)
- Siling Town (寺岭镇)
- Fengxi Town (凤溪镇)
- Dahe Township (大和乡)
- Baimiao Township (白庙乡)

== Transportation ==
Bazhong railway station is situated here.
