= Bazhong–Dazhou railway =

Railway line in China

The Bazhong–Dazhou railway (Chinese: 巴达铁路) is a railway line in Sichuan, China.

== History ==
Construction on the line began on 27 September 2009. It opened on 10 January 2016.

== Specification ==
At Bazhong railway station the line continues as the Guangyuan–Bazhong railway. The line joins the Xiangyang–Chongqing railway north of Dushi railway station. The line is 128 kilometres (80 mi) long and has a maximum speed of 120 kilometres per hour (75 mph).
