= Conghua, Guangzhou =

Conghua 从化区 Tsungfa
- District
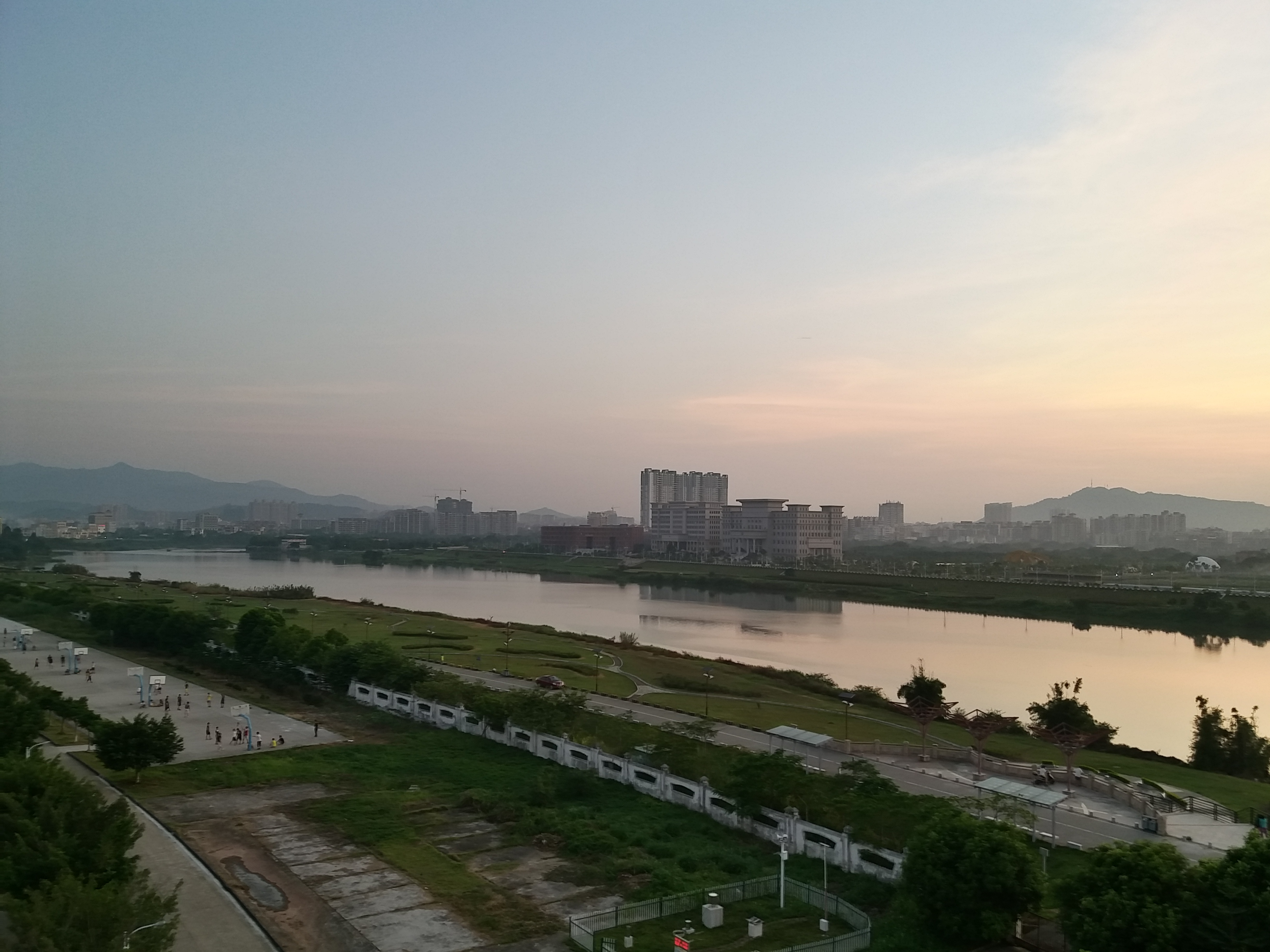
- Liuxi Riverfront Park in Jiekou Subdistrict
- Interactive map of Conghua
- Coordinates: 23°39′N 113°40′E
- Country: People's Republic of China
- Province: Guangdong
- Sub-provincial city: Guangzhou

Area
  - Total: 1,974.15 km^{2} (762.22 sq mi)

Population (2020 census)
  - Total: 717,684
  - Density: 363.541/km^{2} (941.566/sq mi)
- Time zone: UTC+8 (China Standard)
- Postal code: 510900
- Area code: 020
- Website: www.conghua.gov.cn

Conghua
- Simplified Chinese: 从化
- Traditional Chinese: 從化
- Guangdong Romanization: Cung4-fa3
- Hanyu Pinyin: Cónghuà
- Postal: Tsungfa
- Literal meaning: From Change
Transcriptions
Standard Mandarin
- Hanyu Pinyin: Cónghuà
- Wade–Giles: Ts'ung-hua
Yue: Cantonese
- Yale Romanization: Chùhngfa
- Jyutping: Cung4 faa3
- Canton Romanization: Cung4-fa3
- IPA: [tsʰʊŋ˩.fa˧]

Conghua District, alternately romanized as Tsungfa, (Note: The Postal Map spelling was based on the name's local Cantonese pronunciation. The name has also been romanized Tsung-fa, Ts'ung-hwa, and Tsung-hwa-heën.) (Jyutping: Cung^{4}faa^{3}), is one of 11 urban districts and the northernmost district of the prefecture-level city of Guangzhou, the capital of Guangdong Province, China. Conghua connects the Pearl River Delta with the mountainous area of northern Guangdong. Within China, it is known for its hot springs and lychees. Covering an area of 1,974.15 km^{2} (762.22 sq mi), it is the largest urban district of Guangzhou by area, with a population of 717,684 in 2020. Its GDP was RMB41.668 billion in 2018.

== History ==
Under the Qing, the area was known as Conghua County. It was subsequently upgraded to county-level city status and then, on 12 February 2014, to an urban district of Guangzhou.

== Administrative divisions ==
Name	Chinese (S)	Hanyu Pinyin	Canton Romanization	Population (2010)	Area (km^{2})
Jiekou Subdistrict	街口街道	Jiēkǒu Jiēdào	gai1 heo2 gai1 dou6	96,846	21.84
Chengjiao Subdistrict	城郊街道	Chéngjiāo Jiēdào	séng4 gao1 gai1 dou6	79,085	160.00
Jiangbu Subdistrict	江埔街道	Jiāngbù Jiēdào	gong1 bou3 gai1 dou6	95,843	127.00
Wenquan town	温泉镇	Wēnquán Zhèn	wen1 qun4 zen3	55,194	210.90
Liangkou town	良口镇	Liángkǒu Zhèn	lêng4 heo2 zen3	32,829	530.60
Lütian town	吕田镇	Lǚtián Zhèn	lêu5 tin4 zen3	23,430	393.00
Taiping town	太平镇	Tàipíng Zhèn	tai3 ping4 zen3	94,369	210.32
Aotou town	鳌头镇	Áotóu Zhèn	ngou4 teo4 zen3	111,308	410.00

== Climate ==
Climate data for Conghua, elevation 38 m (125 ft), (1991–2020 normals, extremes 1981–2010)
Month	Jan	Feb	Mar	Apr	May	Jun	Jul	Aug	Sep	Oct	Nov	Dec	Year
Record high °C (°F)	28.6 (83.5)	30.3 (86.5)	33.0 (91.4)	34.0 (93.2)	35.4 (95.7)	37.9 (100.2)	39.0 (102.2)	37.7 (99.9)	37.6 (99.7)	36.7 (98.1)	34.1 (93.4)	29.8 (85.6)	39.0 (102.2)
Mean daily maximum °C (°F)	18.4 (65.1)	20.2 (68.4)	22.6 (72.7)	26.3 (79.3)	30.0 (86.0)	32.2 (90.0)	33.8 (92.8)	33.7 (92.7)	32.6 (90.7)	29.3 (84.7)	25.1 (77.2)	20.1 (68.2)	27.0 (80.7)
Daily mean °C (°F)	12.4 (54.3)	14.7 (58.5)	17.7 (63.9)	21.6 (70.9)	25.3 (77.5)	27.3 (81.1)	28.2 (82.8)	27.8 (82.0)	26.7 (80.1)	23.2 (73.8)	18.9 (66.0)	13.7 (56.7)	21.5 (70.6)
Mean daily minimum °C (°F)	8.6 (47.5)	11.1 (52.0)	14.3 (57.7)	18.2 (64.8)	22.0 (71.6)	24.1 (75.4)	24.5 (76.1)	24.3 (75.7)	23.1 (73.6)	19.0 (66.2)	14.8 (58.6)	9.5 (49.1)	17.8 (64.0)
Record low °C (°F)	−2.9 (26.8)	0.0 (32.0)	1.3 (34.3)	8.3 (46.9)	12.9 (55.2)	17.0 (62.6)	20.1 (68.2)	22.2 (72.0)	15.5 (59.9)	8.5 (47.3)	1.5 (34.7)	−1.6 (29.1)	−2.9 (26.8)
Average precipitation mm (inches)	56.1 (2.21)	61.6 (2.43)	128.3 (5.05)	230.2 (9.06)	328.6 (12.94)	436.3 (17.18)	216.5 (8.52)	242.1 (9.53)	153.9 (6.06)	51.9 (2.04)	38.6 (1.52)	40.7 (1.60)	1,984.8 (78.14)
Average precipitation days (≥ 0.1 mm)	8.1	10.3	15.9	16.2	18.8	20.4	17.6	17.3	12.3	5.2	5.9	6.2	154.2
Average relative humidity (%)	74	78	82	83	83	84	81	82	80	75	74	71	79
Mean monthly sunshine hours	112.4	82.4	64.0	67.9	100.6	117.7	181.2	174.8	173.3	185.7	163.8	149.5	1,573.3
Percentage possible sunshine	33	26	17	18	24	29	44	44	47	52	50	45	36
Source: China Meteorological Administration

== Transportation ==
=== Metro ===
Conghua is currently serviced by one metro line operated by the Guangzhou Metro:

- Line 14 - Taiping, Shengang, Chicao, Conghua Coach Terminal, Dongfeng

== See also ==
- Yueyuan Animal Breeding Farm
- Guangzhou
- Wenquan, Guangdong
