= Bazhong =

Bazhong 巴中市 Pachung
- Prefecture-level city
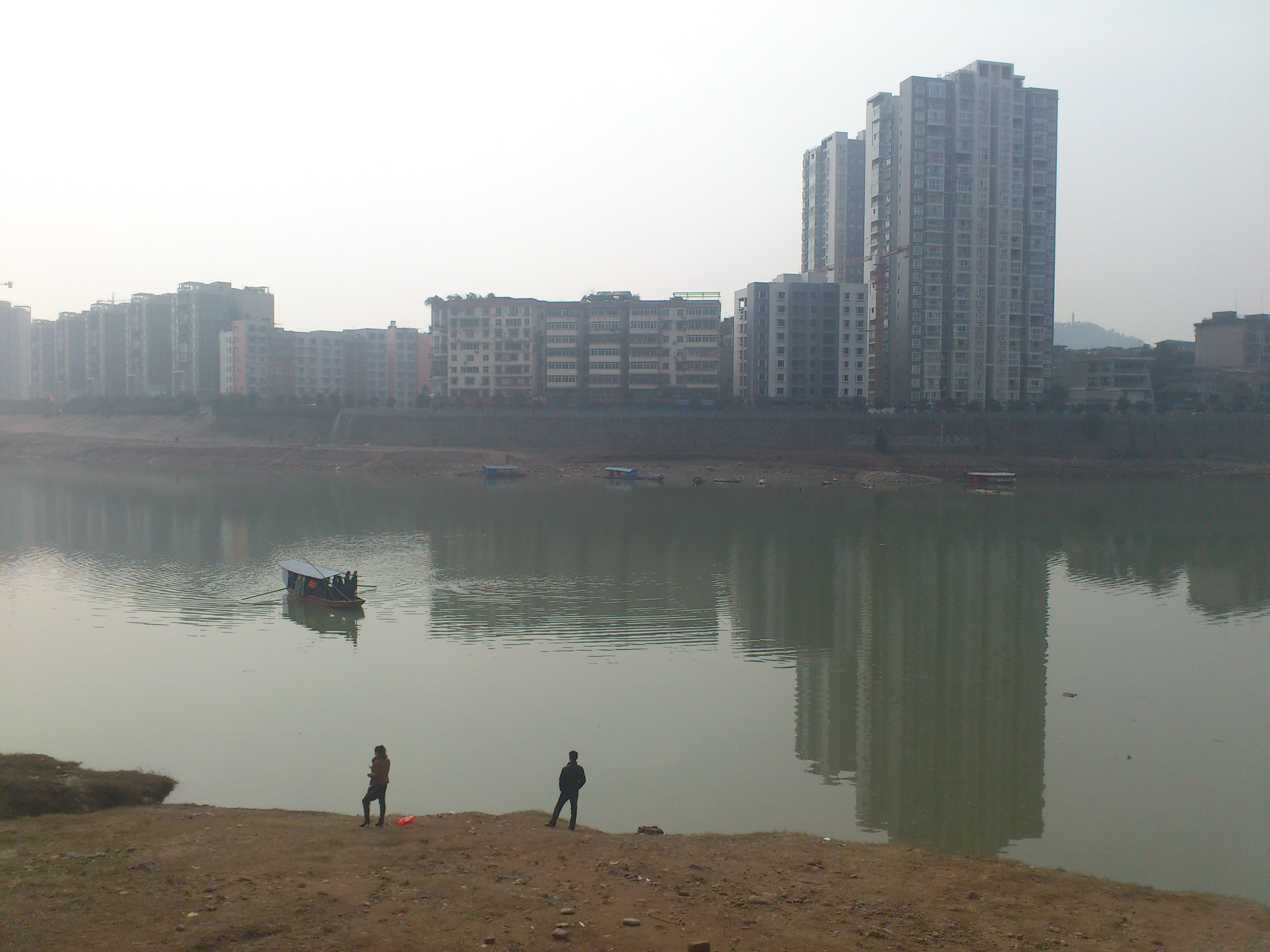
- Nickname: Bazhou
- Location of Bazhong in Sichuan
- Coordinates (Bazhong government): 31°52′05″N 106°44′53″E
- Country: People's Republic of China
- Province: Sichuan
- County-level divisions: 2 districts 3 counties
- Municipal seat: Bazhou District

Area
  - Prefecture-level city: 12,301 km^{2} (4,749 sq mi)
  - Urban: 1,404 km^{2} (542 sq mi)
  - Metro: 1,404 km^{2} (542 sq mi)
- Elevation: 392 m (1,286 ft)
- Highest elevation: 2,507 m (8,225 ft)
- Lowest elevation: 208.3 m (683 ft)

Population (2020 census)
  - Prefecture-level city: 2,712,894
  - Density: 220.54/km^{2} (571.20/sq mi)
  - Urban: 1,064,766
  - Urban density: 758.4/km^{2} (1,964/sq mi)
  - Metro: 1,064,766
  - Metro density: 758.4/km^{2} (1,964/sq mi)

GDP
  - Prefecture-level city: CN¥ 50.1 billion US$ 8.0 billion
  - Per capita: CN¥ 15,076; US$ 2,421
- Time zone: UTC+8 (China Standard)
- Postal code: 636600
- Area code: 0827
- ISO 3166 code: CN-SC-19
- Licence plate prefixes: 川Y
- Website: cnbz.gov.cn

Bazhong (Chinese: 巴中; pinyin: Bāzhōng; lit. 'centre of Ba') is a prefecture-level city in north-eastern Sichuan province, China. Its population was 2,712,894 at the 2020 census whom 1,064,766 lived in Bazhou and Enyang urban districts. As of the end of 2022, the resident population of Bazhong City was 2,658,800 people. At the end of 2024, the city's resident population was 2.613 million, including 1,278 million urban residents, and the urbanization rate of the resident population was 48.91%, an increase of 0.39 percentage points over the end of the previous year. At the end of the year, the registered population of the city was 3.543 million, a decrease of 23,100 compared with the end of the previous year.

== History ==
Bazhong became a prefecture-level city in 1993. Its history goes back further; during the Xia and Shang dynasties, it was purportedly a vassal territory of Liang State. In the Spring and Autumn period, it was called Bazi (巴子). In the Qin and Western Han dynasties it was called Ba County (巴郡). In the Eastern Han dynasty, around the year 100 CE, this was changed to Hanchang County (漢昌縣). One hundred years later it reverted to Baxi County (巴西). Since then it has usually either been called Liang County (梁郡) or Yi County (益州).

In ancient times, it was the land of the Ba Kingdom, and after the Qin Kingdom destroyed the Ba Kingdom, the Ba County was established. The Western Han dynasty belongs to Dangqu County, Ba County. In the third year of Yongyuan in the Eastern Han dynasty (91 years), Hanchang County was located in the north of Dangqu County, and it was governed by the urban area of Bazhou today. During the period from Shu Han to the Northern and Southern dynasties, Dangqu County was repeatedly established, and Hanchang County belonged to it. In the first year of the Northern Wei dynasty (504), Dagu County was established in Hanchang County. In the third year of Yanchang (514), Bazhou was established, named after the country of Cuba. In the second year of Xiping (517), Bazhou was moved to Hanchang County. In the sixth year (525) of Liangtong in the Southern dynasties, Liangguang County was established in Hanchang County, and it was the county seat of Dagu County in Bazhou. In the second year of the elephant in the Northern Zhou dynasty (580), it was transformed into a county.

In the third year of Sui Daye (607), Bazhou was abolished, Qinghua County was established, and Chenghua County was governed. In the first year of Tang Wude (618), Qinghua County was changed to Bazhou. In the first year of Zhenguan (627), Bazhou belonged to Shannan Road. In the 21st year of Kaiyuan (733 years), it belongs to Shannan West Road. In the Song dynasty, Bazhou belonged to Lizhou Road. Yuan dynasty belongs to Guangyuan Road. In the ninth year of Ming Hongwu (1376), Huacheng County entered Bazhou, and Bazhou was reduced to Ba County. In the ninth year of Zhengde (1514), Bazhou was restored and belonged to Baoning. Qing dynasty because of Ming system.

In the second year of the Republic of China (1913), Bazhou was changed to Bazhong County, belonging to North Sichuan Road, and the following year to Jialing Road. 1928 Abolition system. From 1933 to 1935, the Fourth Front Army of the Chinese Workers' and Peasants' Red Army established the Soviet government here in Bazhong County, Sichuan-Shaanxi Province. In the 24th year of the Republic of China (1935), Bazhong County belonged to the 15th Administrative Inspectorate District of Sichuan Province.

After the founding of the People's Republic of China, Bazhong County belongs to the Daxian District of the North Sichuan Administration District. In 1952, Daxian Prefecture was directly led by Sichuan Province. In 1968, the Daxian area was renamed Daxian area. In July 1993, Bazhong County was revoked and Bazhong City was established at the county level; Bazhong District was established by Daxian District, and the Administrative Office was stationed in Bazhong City, and Tongjiang, Nanjiang, and Pyeongchang counties were placed under Bazhong District. On 14 June 2000, the Bazhong area was revoked, and the prefecture-level Bazhong City was established. The original county-level Bazhong City was changed to Bazhou District. On 18 January 2013, Enyang District was established by Bazhou District.

== Geography and climate ==
Bazhong is located at the southern end of the Daba Mountains, and borders Shaanxi province to the north, Dazhou to the east, Nanchong to the south, and Guangyuan to the west. Its area is 12,301 square kilometres (4,749 sq mi), which is mountainous with elevations up to 208.3 to 2,507 metres (683 to 8,225 ft) above sea level.

Bazhong has a monsoon-influenced humid subtropical climate (Köppen Cwa) which is largely mild and humid, with four distinct seasons. Winter is short, mild, and foggy, though actual precipitation is low. January averages 5.8 °C (42.4 °F), and while frost may occur, snow is rare. Summers are long, hot and humid, with temperatures often reaching 33 °C (91 °F). The daily average in July and August is around 27 °C (81 °F), with August being slightly warmer. Spring is warm and temperatures rise quickly but unstably, and hail is common. Rainfall is light in winter and can be heavy in summer, and more than 70% of the annual total occurs between May and September. The annual frost-free period lasts between 260 and 280 days.

Climate data for Bazhong, elevation 418 m (1,371 ft), (1991–2020 normals, extremes 1971–present)
Month	Jan	Feb	Mar	Apr	May	Jun	Jul	Aug	Sep	Oct	Nov	Dec	Year
Record high °C (°F)	19.1 (66.4)	22.6 (72.7)	31.9 (89.4)	35.2 (95.4)	37.5 (99.5)	37.6 (99.7)	39.4 (102.9)	40.6 (105.1)	38.4 (101.1)	34.0 (93.2)	27.8 (82.0)	19.5 (67.1)	40.6 (105.1)
Mean daily maximum °C (°F)	9.7 (49.5)	12.5 (54.5)	17.6 (63.7)	23.2 (73.8)	27.0 (80.6)	29.6 (85.3)	32.4 (90.3)	32.5 (90.5)	27.1 (80.8)	21.7 (71.1)	16.4 (61.5)	10.7 (51.3)	21.7 (71.1)
Daily mean °C (°F)	5.8 (42.4)	8.3 (46.9)	12.5 (54.5)	17.7 (63.9)	21.6 (70.9)	24.7 (76.5)	27.4 (81.3)	27.0 (80.6)	22.5 (72.5)	17.4 (63.3)	12.3 (54.1)	7.2 (45.0)	17.0 (62.7)
Mean daily minimum °C (°F)	3.2 (37.8)	5.4 (41.7)	8.8 (47.8)	13.5 (56.3)	17.4 (63.3)	21.0 (69.8)	23.6 (74.5)	23.1 (73.6)	19.5 (67.1)	14.8 (58.6)	9.6 (49.3)	4.9 (40.8)	13.7 (56.7)
Record low °C (°F)	−4.5 (23.9)	−2.3 (27.9)	−0.8 (30.6)	3.6 (38.5)	9.9 (49.8)	13.4 (56.1)	17.0 (62.6)	17.0 (62.6)	12.9 (55.2)	2.7 (36.9)	0.5 (32.9)	−5.3 (22.5)	−5.3 (22.5)
Average precipitation mm (inches)	11.2 (0.44)	17.0 (0.67)	32.1 (1.26)	64.2 (2.53)	120.8 (4.76)	160.3 (6.31)	228.7 (9.00)	150.4 (5.92)	157.3 (6.19)	87.9 (3.46)	41.9 (1.65)	13.9 (0.55)	1,085.7 (42.74)
Average precipitation days (≥ 0.1 mm)	7.7	7.4	9.6	11.1	12.6	12.9	14.1	10.9	12.8	13.5	9.3	7.5	129.4
Average snowy days	1.1	0.4	0.1	0	0	0	0	0	0	0	0	0.4	2
Average relative humidity (%)	79	76	73	72	72	76	76	74	79	82	83	82	77
Mean monthly sunshine hours	54.2	58.4	105.9	141.8	154.9	148.9	187.6	200.9	112.3	90.7	71.3	49.6	1,376.5
Percentage possible sunshine	17	19	28	36	36	35	44	49	31	26	23	16	30
Source 1: China Meteorological Administration
Source 2: Weather China

== Administration ==
Bazhong has 2 districts, 3 counties, 188 township, and 2,354 villages. The population was 2,712,894 in November 2020, with 1,252,293 of that urban.

Map
Name	Hanzi	Hanyu Pinyin	Population (2020)	Area (km^{2})	Density (/km^{2})
Bazhou District	巴州区	Bāzhōu Qū	719,038 (Note: including Bazhong Economic Development Zone)	1,418	507
Enyang District	恩阳区	Ēnyáng Qū	345,728	1,149	301
Tongjiang County	通江县	Tōngjiāng Xiàn	521,875	4,104	127
Nanjiang County	南江县	Nánjiāng Xiàn	467,609	3,271	143
Pingchang County	平昌县	Píngchāng Xiàn	658,644	2,193	300

== Transportation ==
The Guangyuan–Bazhong railway and Bazhong–Dazhou railway pass through the city. There are passenger stations at Bazhong and Pingchang.

== Economy ==
The city's GDP accounts for approximately 1.9% of Sichuan's total GDP and ranks nineteenth in the province. In 2017, Bazhong's GDP reached RMB 60.1 billion, representing a rise of 8.1%.

The city is served by Bazhong Enyang Airport which opened in February 2019.

== See also ==
- Southern Cliff Buddhist Sculptures, a tourist attraction south of the city
