= Oath of the Peach Garden =

Fictitious oath taken by Liu Bei, Guan Yu and Zhang Fei

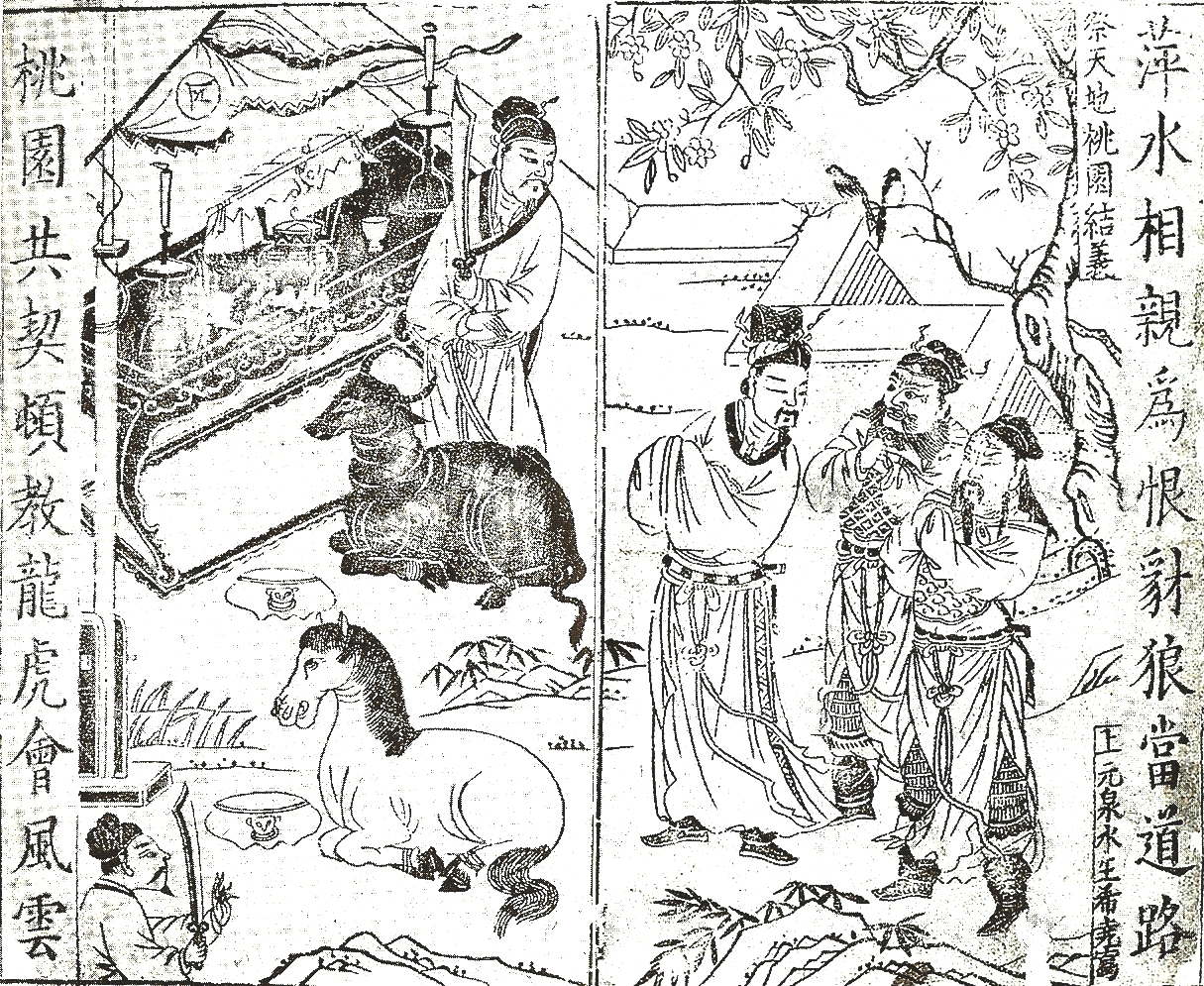
- The Oath of the Peach Garden as depicted in a Ming dynasty edition of Romance of the Three Kingdoms
- Traditional Chinese: 桃園(三)結義
- Simplified Chinese: 桃园(三)结义
Transcriptions
Standard Mandarin
- Hanyu Pinyin: Táoyuán (Sān) Jiéyì

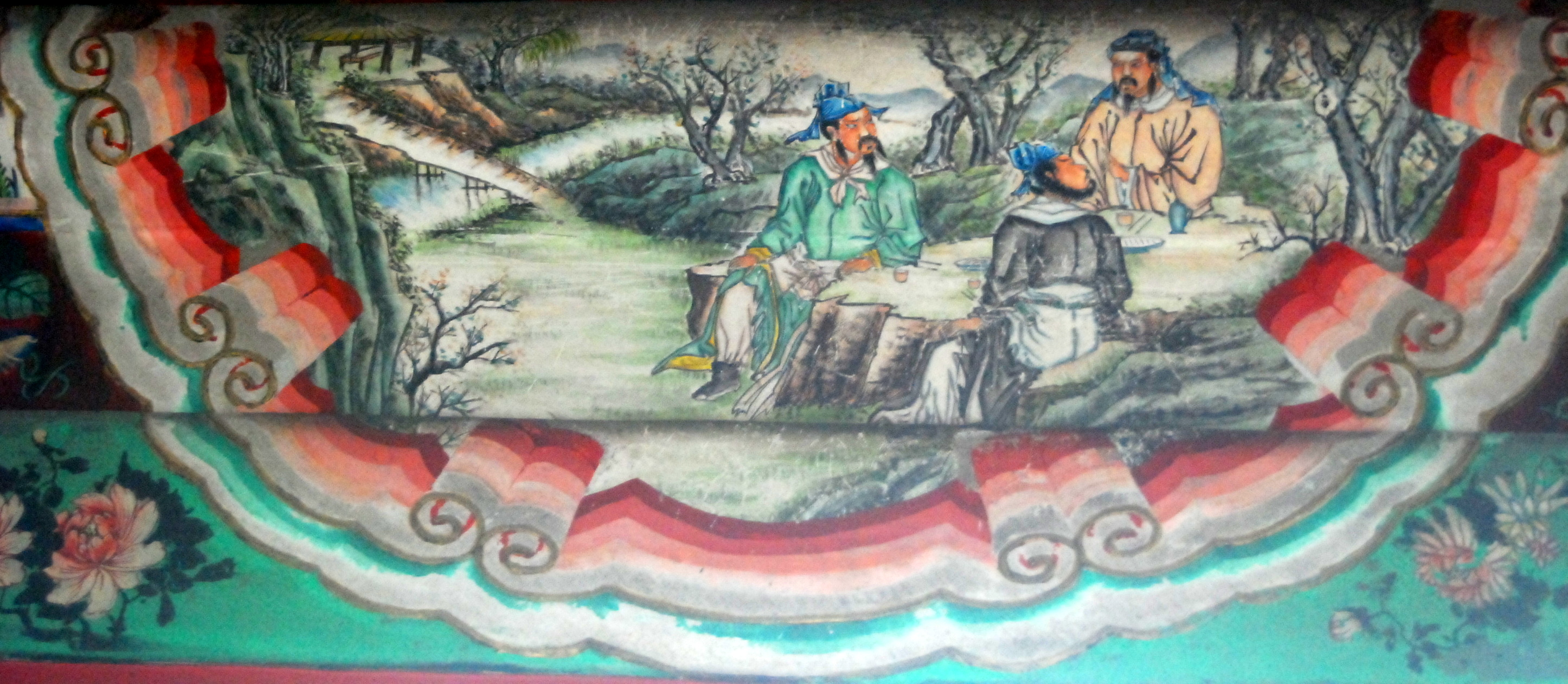
A mural depicting the Oath of the Peach Garden inside the Long Corridor on the grounds of the Summer Palace in Beijing, China

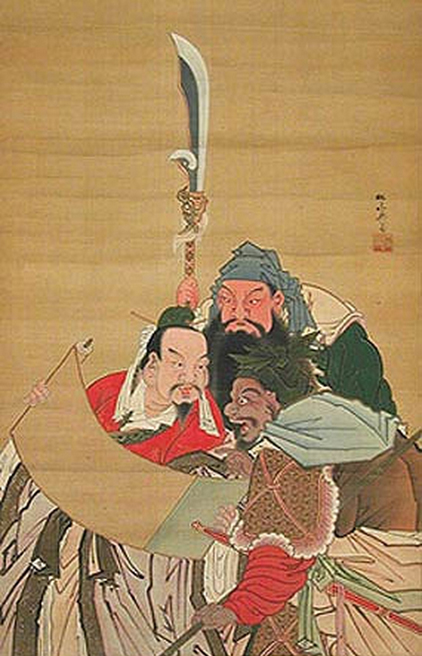
An Ukiyo-e work created by Japanese artist Sakurai Sekkan shows the oath of these three men

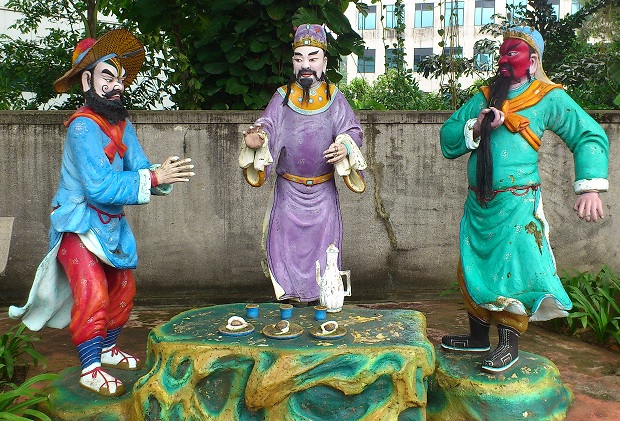
Statues of (from left) Zhang Fei, Liu Bei and Guan Yu at Haw Par Villa, Singapore

The Oath of the Peach Garden is a fictional event in the 14th century Chinese historical novel Romance of the Three Kingdoms by Luo Guanzhong. This event is set at the end of the Eastern Han dynasty around the time of the Yellow Turban Rebellion in the 180s CE. Liu Bei, Guan Yu and Zhang Fei took an oath of fraternity in a ceremony in the Peach Garden (believed to be in present-day Zhuozhou, Hebei), and became sworn brothers from then on. Their goal in taking the oath was to protect the Han Empire from the Yellow Turban rebels. The oath bound the three men, who would later play important roles in the establishment of the state of Shu Han during the Three Kingdoms period. It is also often alluded to as a symbol of fraternal loyalty.

== Historicity ==
There is no mention of the three men becoming sworn brothers in Chen Shou's Records of the Three Kingdoms, the authoritative source for the history of the late Eastern Han dynasty and the Three Kingdoms period. However, in Guan Yu's biography, their relationship was described to be "as close as brothers", to the point of "sharing the same bed". Zhang Fei's biography also mentioned that Guan Yu was older than Zhang Fei, so Zhang regarded Guan as an elder brother.

== Early accounts of the oath trope ==
Like many fictitious events in Romance of the Three Kingdoms, the Oath of the Peach Garden was developed based on folk tales from earlier generations. He Jing in the early Yuan dynasty wrote the Inscription of the Temple of Prince Yiyong Wu'an of Han, which consisted of the statement "The Prince (Guan Yu) was friends with General of Chariots and Cavalry [Zhang] Fei and Zhaolie (Emperor, Liu Bei), vowing to be brothers". An opera titled Liu, Guan, Zhang's Oath of the Peach Garden and a novella titled Records of the Three Kingdoms in Plain Language, both written during the Yuan dynasty, provided different accounts of the three men becoming sworn brothers. In Records of the Three Kingdoms in Plain Language, Zhang Fei first met Guan Yu in Zhuo County and appreciated his outstanding appearance, so he invited him to a drink. There Liu Bei encountered them and respected their extraordinary appearances and physiques. The three men went to drink together at Zhang Fei's peach garden and swore to become brothers, before Liu Bei expressed his lofty aim to save the nation.

== In Romance of the Three Kingdoms ==
=== Background ===
Chapter 1 of Romance of the Three Kingdoms sets out the story of the Ten Attendants' usurpation of power and the Yellow Turban Rebellion, which destabilised the Han Empire. When the Yellow Turban rebels were advancing on You Province, the governor posted a conscription notice in Zhuo County. Seeing the notice, Liu Bei, a 28-year-old distant descendant of the empire's ruling house, let out a long sigh. He was scolded by Zhang Fei, who worked as a butcher, for not serving the country. Liu Bei then shared his aspirations of saving the country and the people, and Zhang Fei suggested they should together recruit a voluntary militia to combat the Yellow Turbans. While drinking at a restaurant, they met Guan Yu, who was on his way to join the army. Liu Bei told him about their plan and the three men went to Zhang Fei's home to discuss. Zhang Fei suggested they should conduct a sacrificial ceremony to heaven and earth and take the oath as brothers under blossoming peach trees in his garden, to which Liu Bei and Guan Yu agreed.

=== The oath ===
The oath, as it appears in the Wikisource translation of Chapter 1 of Romance of the Three Kingdoms, was this:

When saying the names Liu Bei, Guan Yu and Zhang Fei, although the surnames are different, yet we have come together as brothers. From this day forward, we shall join forces for a common purpose: to save the troubled and to aid the endangered. We shall avenge the nation above, and pacify the citizenry below. We seek not to be born on the same day, in the same month and in the same year. We merely hope to die on the same day, in the same month and in the same year. May the Gods of Heaven and Earth attest to what is in our hearts. If we should ever do anything to betray our friendship, may heaven and the people of the earth both strike us dead.

In many other translations, only the section dealing with "dying on the same day" is present.

=== After the oath ===
After the oath, Liu Bei was declared the eldest brother, followed by Guan Yu and Zhang Fei as the most junior. Liu Bei ordered the craftsman to forge a pair of swords, Guan Yu the Green Dragon Crescent Blade and Zhang Fei a 1.8-zhang Snake Lance. They recruited 500 volunteers to fight under the governor's command and repelled the advancing rebels, in what became the first battle of the brothers' long journey to pacify the nation.

In spite of their oath, the three brothers did not die on the same day. Guan Yu was killed by Sun Quan's forces in 220. When Liu Bei ascended to the throne to restore the house of Han, his first edict was to wage war on Sun Quan to avenge Guan Yu. Zhang Fei was saddened by Guan Yu's death and often tortured his subordinates to vent his anger; he was finally assassinated by his subordinates in 221, right before the eastern expedition. Liu Bei died of illness in 223, a year after his disastrous defeat at the Battle of Xiaoting.

When the Shu Han forces were summoned, Guan Yu's son Guan Xing and Zhang Fei's son Zhang Bao competed to lead the vanguard force, and even challenged each other to a duel. Liu Bei berated them for forgetting their late fathers' fraternity. On Liu Bei's order, Guan Xing and Zhang Bao became oath brothers too.

== Cultural influence ==
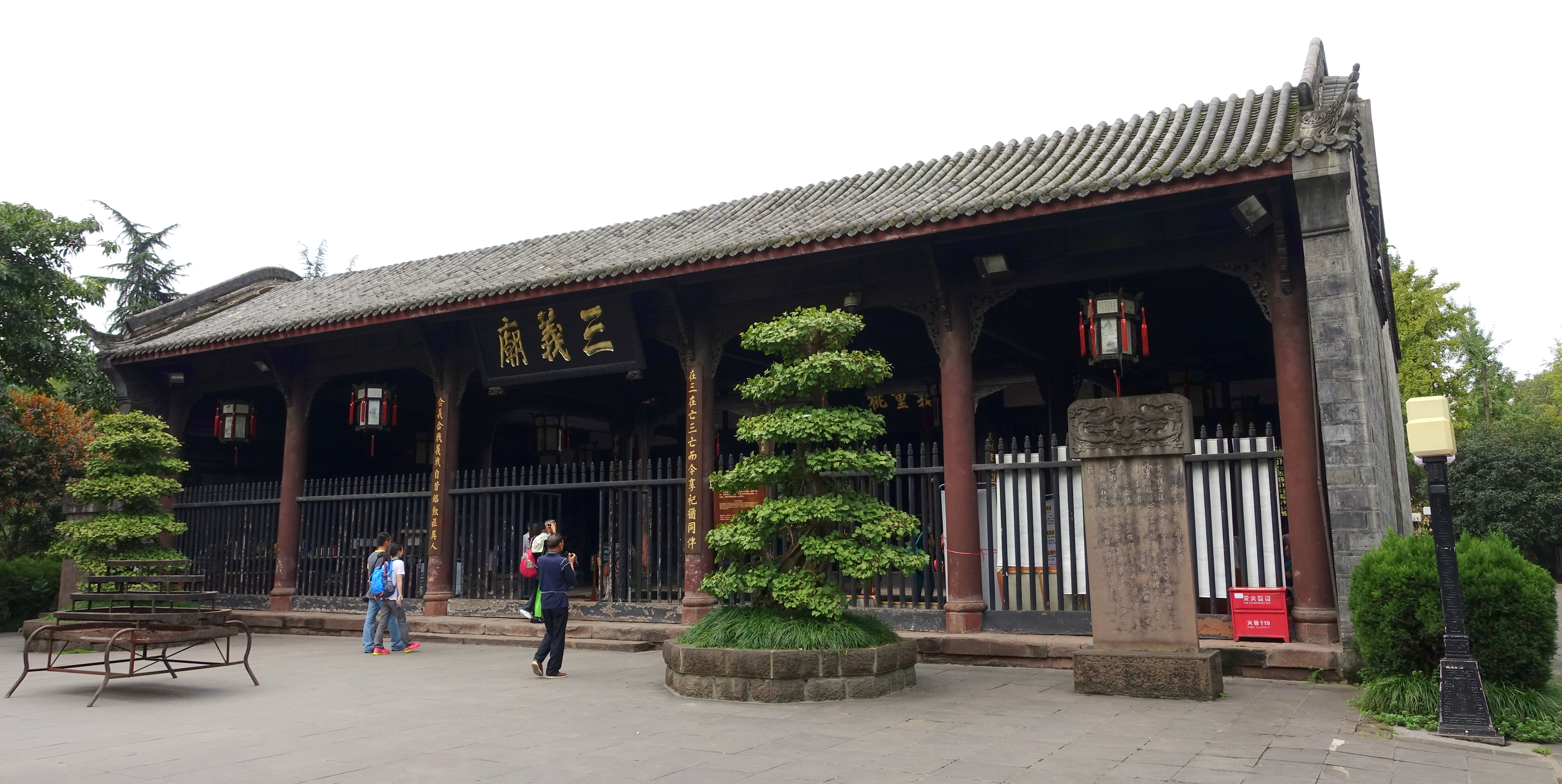
Sanyi Temple, Chengdu

Temples known as "Sanyi Temples" (literally Temples of the Three Righteous) are dedicated to the three oath brothers. They can be found in many places such as Zhuozhou, where Liu Bei was from and the oath fictitiously took place, and Chengdu, the capital of Shu Han.

Some operas and critics narrating the Three Kingdoms call Zhao Yun the fourth brother, but this is a secondary creation rather than a creation by Luo Guanzhong. In Chapter 73 of Romance of the Three Kingdoms, when created the first among the Five Tiger Generals, Guan Yu commented that Zhao Yun "has been a longtime follower of my elder brother, and is like my younger brother". This cannot be interpreted as Zhao Yun having taken an oath of fraternity.

The oath also inspired the present-day secret societies in Chinese communities, such as the triads, to use a similar ritual when swearing in new members. "Though not born on the same day of the same month in the same year, we hope to die so"—the phrase the three brothers made during the oath—had also become popular among present-day secret society members.

A Magic: The Gathering team comprising Reid Duke, William Jensen and Owen Turtenwald is named "Peach Garden Oath" after the Oath of the Peach Garden.

== See also ==
- List of fictitious stories in Romance of the Three Kingdoms
