= Cao Bao (disambiguation) =

Cao Bao may refer to:

- Cao Bao (Shutong) (曹褒; died 102), style name Shutong (叔通), Eastern Han dynasty scholar; see Book of the Later Han
- Cao Bao (died 196) (曹豹; died 196), vassal serving under the Eastern Han dynasty warlord Tao Qian, later served Liu Bei and Lü Bu
- Cao Bao (曹褒), Eastern Han dynasty official, served as Administrator of Yingchuan, grandfather of Cao Ren
