= Cao Cao's invasion of Xu Province =

Invasion by warlord Cao Cao against Tao Qian (193–194)

- Part of the wars at the end of the Han dynasty
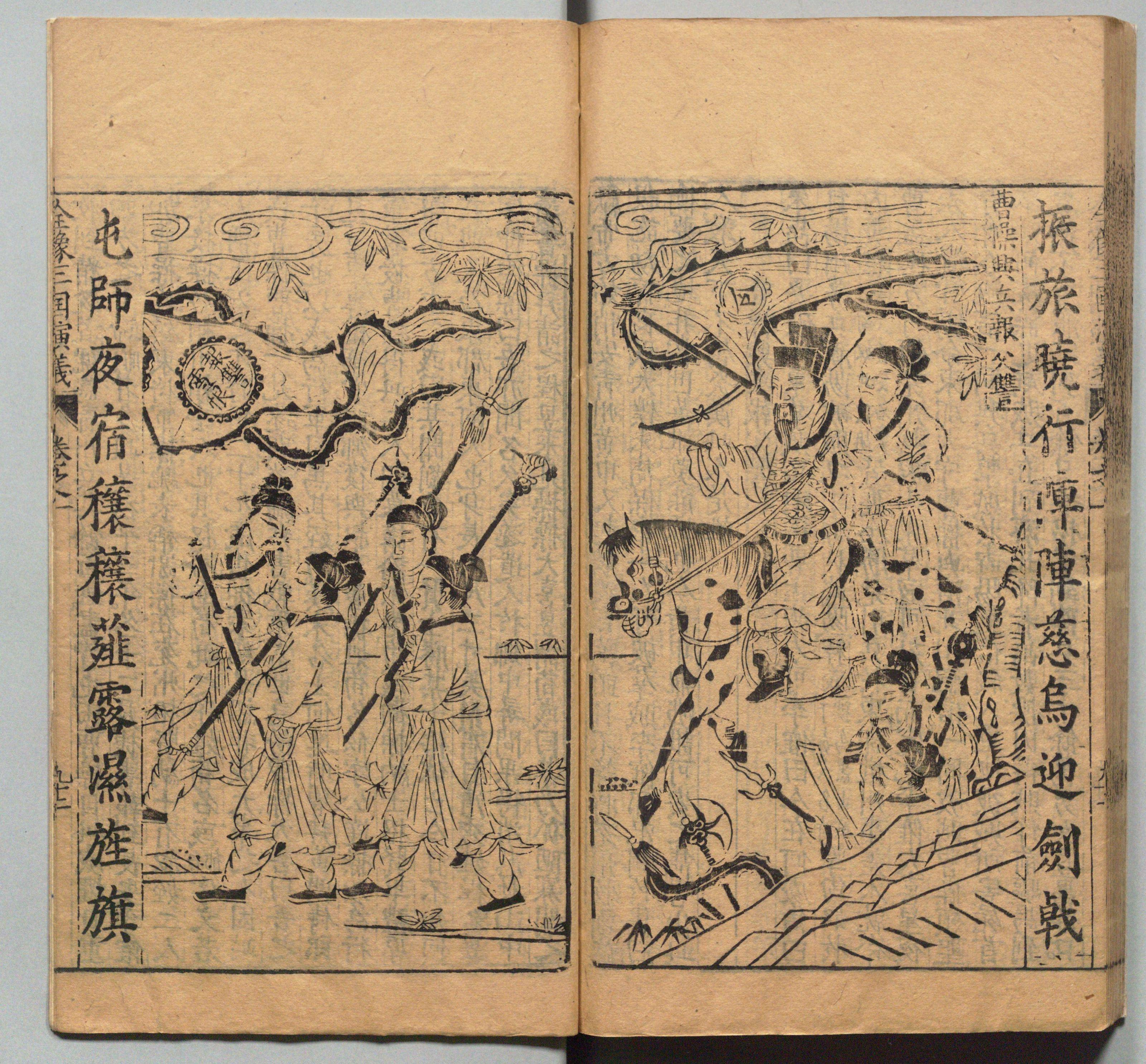
- A Ming dynasty illustration of Cao Cao (right, on horseback) departing to attack Xu Province.
Date	193–194 CE
Location	Jiangsu, China
Result	Inconclusive, Cao Cao retreat

Belligerents
Cao Cao	Tao Qian; Tian Kai

Commanders and leaders
Cao Cao; Cao Ren	Tao Qian; Liu Bei; Cao Bao

Strength
Unknown	More than 5,000

Casualties and losses
Unknown	Over 100,000 civilians

Cao Cao's invasion of Xu Province was a punitive invasion launched by the warlord Cao Cao against Tao Qian, the Governor of Xu Province, in the late Eastern Han dynasty. The casus belli for the invasion was the murder of Cao Cao's father, Cao Song, in Xu Province. Although Tao Qian's culpability was questionable, Cao Cao nonetheless held him responsible. The invasion took place in two separate waves in 193 and 194, during each of which Cao Cao captured a number of towns and engaged in collective punishment of the civilian populace.

== Background ==
Cao Cao's father Cao Song was living in his hometown Qiao (譙; present-day Bozhou, Anhui) after retirement until it became a battlefield during the Campaign against Dong Zhuo. So Cao Song along with the rest of his family moved to Langya (琅邪; present-day Linyi, Shandong) in Xu Province. By 193, Cao Cao had established a base in Yan Province (covering present-day southwestern Shandong and eastern Henan), and invited his father over to his territory. Cao Song was very wealthy, and had brought with him a baggage train consisting of more than 100 covered carts full of his effects. In or near Hua County (near Mount Tai), on the border of Xu Province and Yan Province, Cao Song and his son Cao De (曹德) were ambushed and killed. There were two accounts of how they were murdered. According to the Book of the Later Han and Zizhi Tongjian, Tao Qian had garrisoned men nearby at Yinping, who were tempted by greed for Cao Song's riches and murdered him for his wealth en route to his destination. According to Wei Zhao's Book of Wu – the official history of Eastern Wu – Tao Qian despatched 200 bodyguards led by Commandant of the Capital Zhang Kai (張闓) to escort Cao Song, but Zhang instead murdered Cao and made off with his riches. Regardless of Tao Qian's culpability, Cao Cao intended to hold him responsible for the murder of his father.

== The first invasion ==
In the summer or autumn^{[1]} of 193, Cao Cao invaded Xu Province with an unspecified number of troops and easily captured over ten cities. After conquering Pengcheng (彭城; present-day Xuzhou, Jiangsu), Cao Cao killed possibly more than 10,000 defenders.^{[2]} Tao Qian fled to Tan (剡; present-day Tancheng County, Linyi, Shandong), where he was joined by Tian Kai. With the reinforcements, Tao Qian was able to resist Cao Cao. Cao Cao's forces eventually ran out of supplies and had to withdraw back to Yan Province.

Thwarted and low on rations, Cao Cao turned his army around, in the process sacking the counties of Qulü (取慮), Suiling (睢陵), and Xiaqiu (夏丘).^{[3]} The local population was swollen with refugees from the violence of the capital regions. Cao Cao's army killed over 100,000 civilians, including both men and women, such that the Si River was dammed up with their corpses. His army took the chickens and dogs for food and tore down the villages into ruins.

== The second invasion ==
In the spring of 194, Cao Cao's army returned to Xu Province, and Tao Qian begged aid from Tian Kai in the nearby Qing Province (青州). Tian Kai sent Tao Qian a force of some thousand men commanded by Liu Bei. Tao Qian, seeking to open a southern front against Cao Cao, appointed Liu Bei as the Inspector of Yu Province, and transferred 4,000 soldiers into his service. Along with Tao Qian's officer Cao Bao, Liu Bei encamped east of Tan (郯).

Cao Cao's army plundered Langya and Donghai (東海; near present-day Tancheng, Shandong), destroying all in its path. Returning west, Cao Cao engaged and defeated Tao Qian's forces led by Liu Bei. According to one source, Cao Cao conquered the nearby city of Xiangben (襄賁) after this.

Xu Province was only granted reprieve when Zhang Miao betrayed Cao Cao and invited Lü Bu to take over Cao Cao's home base in Yan Province (兗州). Cao Cao broke off his vengeance against Tao Qian and turned his army back to attack Lü Bu.

== Aftermath ==
Liu Bei characteristically shifted his alliance from Tian Kai towards Tao Qian and he remained in Xu Province after Cao Cao left. When Tao Qian died of illness later in 194, his sons Tao Shang (陶商) and Tao Ying (陶應) were passed over for governorship by the local elite in favour of Liu Bei. Thus Liu Bei gained his first territory as a result of Cao Cao's campaign.

== In popular culture ==
Cao Cao's invasion of Xu Province is featured as playable stages in the second PSP installment, seventh, eighth, ninth, and Origins instalments of Koei's Dynasty Warriors video game series.

== Notes and references ==
=== Notes ===
1. The Zizhi Tongjian (60.1945) has "autumn", while the Records of the Three Kingdoms (1.11) has "summer". History of Chinese Warfare specifies "the sixth month" (vol. 4, p 67), which corresponds to 17 July to 14 August 193 in the Julian calendar.
2. This casualty statistic, which appears in Tao Qian's biography in Records of the Three Kingdoms (8.249), is attached to a phrase describing the Si River being dammed with the bodies of the dead. According to Rafe de Crespigny (To Establish Peace, volume 1, internet edition (2004), p. 68 note 24 [internet pagination]), this is unsupported by geography and probably happened during Cao Cao's massacre of civilians somewhat farther south, not during his battle at Pengcheng. Thus, the casualty figure is most probably not reliable.
3. The Book of the Later Han (73.2367) also includes Pengcheng and Fuyang (傅陽; in present-day Linyi, Shandong) among Cao Cao's ravages.

=== Sources ===
- Chen Shou, 三國志 (Records of the Three Kingdoms), 280s or 290s. Pei Songzhi, annotation, 429. Hong Kong: Zhonghua Publishing, 1971. 5 vols.
- Sima Guang (2004). To Establish Peace: Being the Chronicle of the Later Han dynasty for the years 189 to 200 AD as recorded in Chapters 59 to 63 of the Zizhi Tongjian of Sima Guang (PDF). Translated by Rafe de Crespigny. Faculty of Asian Studies, Australian National University. ISBN 978-0-7315-2537-9. Archived from the original on 2011-07-22.
- Fan Ye, et al., 後漢書 (Book of the Later Han), 445. Beijing: Zhonghua Publishing, 1965. 12 vols.
- Sima Guang, et al., 資治通鑒 (Zizhi Tongjian), 1084. Hu Sanxing, annotation, 1286. Beijing: Zhonghua Publishing, 1956. 20 vols.
- Wu Guoqing (武國卿); Mu Zhongyue (慕中岳). History of Chinese Warfare 中國戰爭史. Vol. 4. Beijing: Gold Wall Press.
