= Zhang Da =

Zhang Da may refer to either of the following persons:

- Zhang Da (張達), a subordinate of the Three Kingdoms period general Zhang Fei. He and his colleague Fan Qiang assassinated Zhang Fei. See Zhang Fei#Death.
- Zhang Da (eunuch), one of the chief officers under the Ming Dynasty admiral Zheng He.
