= Tian Kai =

Official serving warlord Gongsun Zan (died 199)

- 田楷 (Note: Tian's name was written as "揩" (with the same pronunciation) in Gongsun Zan's biography in Book of the Later Han.)

Inspector of Qing Province (青州刺史) (appointed by Gongsun Zan)
- In office 192 – 199
- Monarch: Emperor Xian of Han

Personal details
- Born: Unknown
- Died: 199
- Occupation: Official

Tian Kai (died 199) was an official serving under the warlord Gongsun Zan during the late Eastern Han dynasty of China.

== Life ==
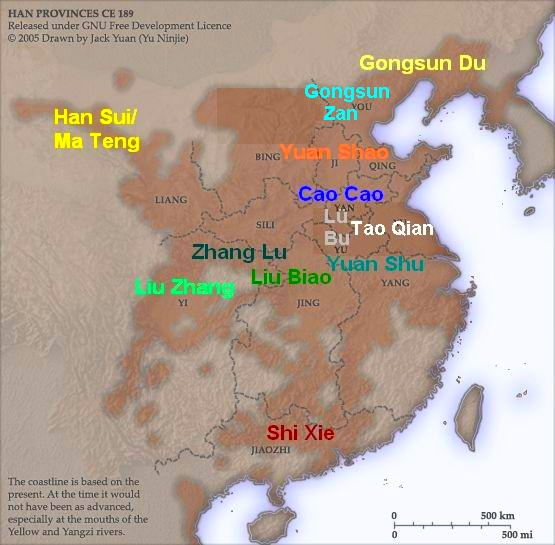
Warlords in China around 194

Little is recorded about Tian Kai in history. He probably started his career as a subordinate of the warlord Gongsun Zan in the Eastern Han dynasty. In the second half of 191, when war broke out between Gongsun Zan and his rival Yuan Shao, Gongsun Zan sent Tian Kai to seize control of Qing Province, which was then under Yuan Shao's control. Tian Kai was appointed as the Inspector of Qing Province in 192. However, Tian Kai only managed to gain control over the northern part of Qing Province, while the southern part remained under the control of Yuan Tan, Yuan Shao's eldest son. The next year he was driven out of Qing. In 193, Gongsun Zan and Yuan Shao agreed to a truce after two years of battles against each other.

In 194, Xu Province came under attack by the warlord Cao Cao. Tao Qian, the Governor of Xu Province, approached his neighbours for help, one of whom was Tian Kai. Tian Kai and Liu Bei, then the Chancellor of Pingyuan Commandery, led their troops to Xu Province to assist Tao Qian and force Cao Cao to retreat.

In 198, war broke out between Gongsun Zan and Yuan Shao again. Tian Kai fought on Gongsun Zan's side in the Battle of Yijing and was killed in action.

== See also ==
- Lists of people of the Three Kingdoms
