= Three Kingdoms: Resurrection of the Dragon =

2008 Hong Kong-Chinese-South Korean film by Daniel Lee

- Film poster

Chinese name
- Traditional Chinese: 三國之見龍卸甲
- Simplified Chinese: 三国之见龙卸甲
Transcriptions
Standard Mandarin
- Hanyu Pinyin: Sān Guó Zhī Jiàn Lóng Xiè Jiǎ
Yue: Cantonese
- Jyutping: Saam1 Gwok3 Zi1 Gin3 Lung4 Se6 Gaap3

Korean name
- Hangul: 삼국지: 용의 부활
- Hanja: 三國志: 龍의 復活
Transcriptions
- Revised Romanization: Samgukji: Yongui Buhwal
- McCune–Reischauer: Samgukchi: Yongŭi Puhwal
- Directed by: Daniel Lee
- Written by: Lau Ho-leung; Daniel Lee
- Produced by: Jeong Tae-won; Suzanna Tsang; Dong Yu
- Starring: Andy Lau; Sammo Hung; Maggie Q Vanness Wu; Andy On; Ti Lung
- Cinematography: Tony Cheung
- Edited by: Cheung Ka-fai; Tang Man-to
- Music by: Henry Lai Wan-man
- Production companies: Visualizer Films; Taewon Entertainment; Bona Film Group; Easternlight
- Distributed by: China Film Group Corporation (China); SK Telecom (South Korea); Sundream Motion Pictures (Hong Kong)
- Release date: 3 April 2008
- Running time: 101 minutes
- Countries: Hong Kong; China; South Korea
- Language: Mandarin
- Budget: US$20 million
- Box office: US$22.14 million

Three Kingdoms: Resurrection of the Dragon is a 2008 action war film directed by Daniel Lee and written by Lee and Lau Ho-leung. It is loosely based on parts of the 14th-century Chinese classical novel Romance of the Three Kingdoms. The film had a reported budget of US$25 million and was a joint production between Hong Kong, China and South Korea. It stars Andy Lau, Sammo Hung, Maggie Q, Vanness Wu, Andy On, and Ti Lung. It was released theatrically in Hong Kong on 3 April 2008.

The film publicity stated that the film's script was inspired by chapter 92 of Romance of the Three Kingdoms. Patrick Frater of Variety wrote that the book is often cited as one of the four most important works in the corpus of Chinese literature. The book is also frequently read in South Korea. As the action takes place late in the Three Kingdoms story, the warrior Zhao Zilong, played by Andy Lau, is the lead character. The film was one of two Three Kingdoms-related films produced in 2007, the other being John Woo's two-part 288-minute Red Cliff.

== Plot ==
The film is set in the late Eastern Han dynasty and early Three Kingdoms period of China. Zhao Zilong, a warrior from Changshan, enlists as a foot soldier in the army of the warlord Liu Bei and befriends Luo Ping'an, a fellow soldier who is also from Changshan. He scores his first victory in a night raid on an enemy camp.

Liu Bei and his forces retreat to Phoenix Heights when they are overwhelmed by the forces of Cao Cao, Liu Bei's rival. When Luo Ping'an fails in his mission to escort Liu Bei's family to safety, Liu Bei's sworn brother Zhang Fei tries to execute him. Zhao Zilong intervenes and engages Zhang Fei and Liu Bei's other sworn brother, Guan Yu, in a spear duel, managing to hold his ground after several rounds. Liu Bei is so impressed that he gives Zhao Zilong his armour, and sends him to save his family. Guan Yu and Zhang Fei provide cover for Zhao Zilong while he searches for survivors. After finding Liu Bei's son Liu Shan, Zhao Zilong straps the infant to his body as he fights his way through enemy lines and charges towards Cao Cao, who has been observing the battle on a cliff. He seizes Cao Cao's sword and leaps to safety on the opposite cliff. Cao Cao's granddaughter, Cao Ying, witnesses the attack. Zhao Zilong later returns to Changshan as a hero and falls in love with a woman putting on a shadow puppet show dedicated to him.

Zhao Zilong continues to fight for Liu Bei and earns himself the nickname "Invincible General" as he has never lost a battle. After Liu Bei becomes emperor of Shu, he names Zhao Zilong one of his Five Tiger Generals alongside Guan Yu, Zhang Fei, Ma Chao, and Huang Zhong. Following Liu Bei's death, the Shu chancellor Zhuge Liang persuades the new emperor, Liu Shan, to wage war against Shu's rival state Wei. By then, a grey-haired Zhao Zilong is the only Tiger General still alive. He insists on going to battle and brings along Guan Xing (Guan Yu's son), Zhang Bao (Zhang Fei's son), Luo Ping'an and Deng Zhi. Zhuge Liang gives him two envelopes and tells him when to open them.

When the Shu army reaches a fork in the road, Zhao Zilong opens the first envelope and follows the instructions to split the army into two groups. Guan Xing and Zhang Bao lead one group, while he and the others lead the other group. Zhao Zilong later engages Wei forces in battle and slays the four sons of the Wei general Han De. Afterwards, he realises he has fallen into a trap set by Cao Ying, Cao Cao's granddaughter who is now leading the Wei army. Retreating to Phoenix Heights, Zhao Zilong is besieged by the enemy and his troops suffer heavy casualties. He opens the second envelope and learns that Zhuge Liang has planned for him to distract the Wei army, while Guan Xing and Zhang Bao led the other force to capture enemy territory.

After attempts by both sides to provoke each other into attacking, Zhao Zilong duels with Cao Ying and defeats her but lets her go. Although he was injured in the duel, he orders his subordinates to keep it secret from their men so that their morale would not be affected. When the Wei forces advance towards Phoenix Heights, Zhao Zilong allows his subordinates to lead all his troops into battle. The Shu army is almost completely wiped out when the Wei forces use gunpowder traps. Han De and Deng Zhi perish in battle.

Zhao Zilong and Luo Ping'an watch the battle and its aftermath from Phoenix Heights. At the end, Luo Ping'an reveals that he had betrayed Zhao Zilong by revealing their location to the enemy because he had been jealous of Zhao Zilong all these years. Zhao Zilong had been rising through the ranks since he joined the army, while Luo Ping'an had remained a foot soldier. The two men make peace with each other. Luo Ping'an helps Zhao Zilong remove his armour and tearfully beats the war drum as Zhao Zilong makes his final charge towards the enemy.

== Cast ==
- Andy Lau as Zhao Zilong, the main character. Regarding his performance, Lau said "There are three perspectives on Zhao; historians' professional knowledge, how normal people like us remember him and his character known through a popular computer game. I can't satisfy all these, but I tried to stay true to the script." Sammo Hung said that "Lau had to portray a man from his 20s to 70s, and he did it perfectly, with the look in his eyes and all, particularly in the last scene when an invincible hero loses for the first time."
- Maggie Q as Cao Ying, a female warrior who wears men's clothing. In the original story, the role was that of a male character. To perform this role, Maggie Q performed several action sequences, learned how to speak Mandarin, and learned how to play the pipa, a Chinese musical instrument. In addition, Maggie Q, a vegan, refused to wear or allow the use of real animal fur during the production of the film, so the costume she wore was made from faux fur instead. Maggie Q said that at times she felt like an "outsider." In regards to the action sequences, she said "It's tough being in these guy movies, I feel like I'm always in these guy movies, I really want to do a chick flick." and in regards to the music work, she argued that she was "not a musician, not even close! It was a cause of a lot of stress. I would go to sleep crying. I feel myself more clumsy and not so feminine and so I just had shut Maggie off for a while and be this person and really believe it." Maggie said in 2008 that while the film "was probably the most difficult film I've done yet," she obtained "love and respect" for Daniel Lee and "everything attracted me about the role and the film." With regards to her character, she said that like Cao Ying, she "got to feel like that in this industry, where you sort of wish you could just be a woman and relax and be happy but it takes a lot of strength to be where you are." Regarding Maggie Q's performance, Hung said "I had doubts. But she blew me away." Zhang Yujiao played the younger Cao Ying.
- Sammo Hung as Luo Ping'an, a soldier from the same hometown as Zhao Zilong.
- Vanness Wu as Guan Xing, Guan Yu's son.
- Andy On as Deng Zhi, a Shu general and a subordinate of Zhao Zilong.
- Ti Lung as Guan Yu, Liu Bei's sworn brother and one of the Five Tiger Generals of Shu.
- Elliot Ngok as Liu Bei, a warlord and the founding emperor of Shu.
- Pu Cunxin as Zhuge Liang, Liu Bei's advisor and the chancellor of Shu.
- Chen Zhihui as Zhang Fei, Liu Bei's sworn brother and one of the Five Tiger Generals of Shu.
- Damian Lau as Cao Cao, a warlord and Liu Bei's rival.
- Yu Rongguang as Han De, a Wei general and subordinate of Cao Ying.
- Ding Haifeng as Zhang Bao, Zhang Fei's son.
- Jiang Hongbo as Ruan'er, Zhao Zilong's romantic interest
- Wang Hongtao as Huang Zhong, one of the Five Tiger Generals of Shu.
- Menghe Wuliji as Ma Chao, one of the Five Tiger Generals of Shu.
- Liang Yujin as Lady Gan, Liu Bei's wife.
- Bai Jing as Lady Mi, Liu Bei's wife.
- Zhao Erkang as Ruan'er's father
- Timmy Hung as Han Ying, Han De's son.
- Yang Jian as Han Yao, Han De's son.
- Chen Guohui as Han Jing, Han De's son.
- Zhang Mang as Han Qi, Han De's son.
- Hu Jingbo as Liu Shan, the last emperor of Shu. Feng Xiaoxiao played the younger Liu Shan.
- Andi Setyawan as Han De's son.

=== Replaced cast ===
Qian Zhijun was originally considered for the role of Liu Shan. The film producers said that they invited Qian to act in the film because, in the words of China Radio International, "they think he's a really interesting guy and the movie needs a lighthearted character for comic relief." An article from the China Film Group Corporation said that the role of Liu Shan suits Qian's appearance and that "Liu Shan was not a very bright person, the Chinese idiom lèbùsī shǔ (樂不思蜀 (Note: see Liu Shan#Life after the fall of Shu for the meaning)) originated from him, he was unassertive and submissive. To qualify for this role, an actor simply needs to relax his mind completely and have no thoughts. The level of difficulty in playing this character is 2 on a scale of 1 to 5 (in order of increasing level of difficulty)." La Carmina of CNN said that Qian's obtaining of the role illustrated that he went "from obscurity to movie stardom". In 2007 the film script was modified due to financing issues. The Liu Shan role was altered, and Qian's planned role in the film was removed. The role of Liu Shan eventually went to Hu Jingbo.

== Production ==
The production companies involved in making the film are Visualizer Film Production Ltd, Taewon Entertainment, and SIL-Metropole Organization of mainland China. The individuals who headed the production were Susanna Tsang of Visualizer and Chung Taewon of Taewon. The Hong Kong company Golden Scene took sales rights within East Asia, including Japan. The company Polybona Films took sales rights within mainland China. Arclight Films took the international sales rights to the film, which it distributed under its Easternlight label. Arclight planned to handle the distribution at the Cannes Film Festival in Cannes, France, and all other international points.

Daniel Lee, the director, had a US$25 million budget. The budget was used for his location shoots in mainland China, which were scheduled to begin in March 2007. Variety said that the film "apparently" was to have 40,000 extras. This would be twice the number of extras used in each of The Lord of the Rings films. Sammo Hung, a martial artist, served as the choreographer of fighting scenes. In addition, Sammo Hung also plays a character, Luo Ping'an, who is a friend of Zhao but becomes jealous of him. Hung expressed satisfaction in the performances of the actors. As of 2008, it was the largest film production that Lee had directed.

The creators opted to use computer graphics, a phenomenon common among war movies with large budgets made in the 2000s. Lee said that the computer graphics were crucial for the overall war scenes and for the smaller details. Lee explained that, while filming in a desert, the weather would change constantly, with rainy weather and sunny weather occurring during the day and snow occurring at night. To compensate for having "four seasons in one day", computer graphics were applied to alter the presentation of the setting. Lee asked Mixfilm, a Korean company, to do the special effects for the film. Lee explained that "I wanted to film a 'documentary' version of 'The Three Kingdoms' through the characters. So I didn't want anything too beautified, and I am very satisfied with the results."

With regards to historical accuracy in the film, Lee said that the creators were not striving for "100% historical authenticity which we were after" since "there were only fictional descriptions in Luo's novel and very limited reliable historical data on the costumes and weapons of the Three Kingdoms era, it did leave a lot of room for the imagination." Lee further explained that "While insisting on retaining the Chinese cultural integrity of the designs, we decided to do a revamp of all the known elements derived from careful research and to develop a visual style that conveys the feelings and moods of the Three Kingdoms period." Lee said that the historical China as depicted in the film "might differ from the historical looks in an average [viewer's] opinion, and would naturally surprise existing fans of the Three Kingdoms epic, [who] might already have their own preconceived visions of what each character, especially Zhao Zilong, looked like." Lee stated that the film was not intended to perfectly represent the original work, which itself is derived from various fictions and oral traditions. Lee said that his film "incorporated more creative manifestations and personalization of the stories in order to explore the character of the legendary Zhao Zilong, both as a warrior and as a man." Lee said that he had no intention of debasing the original work, nor did he have the intention of offending literary purists who were fans of the original book.

== Soundtrack ==
Three Kingdoms: Resurrection of the Dragon Original Motion Picture Soundtrack

Soundtrack album by Henry Lai Wan-man & Capellen Orchestra and Capellen Choir
- Released: 20 April 2009
- Genre: Soundtrack
- Length: 70:53
- Label: Java Music Productions

Henry Lai Wan-man created the soundtrack. It has inspiration from the soundtracks of Ennio Morricone's "Dollars" films and several Hong Kong films such as Once Upon a Time in China.

Track list:

1. Three Kingdoms (4:27)
2. Story of Luo Ping'an (3:35)
3. The Ambush Squad (9:12)
4. Save the Young Lord (8:49)
5. Love Theme (2:54)
6. Shu March (0:47)
7. The Five Generals (2:28)
8. The Northern Expedition (1:21)
9. The Dust Bowl (3:11)
10. The Siege (1:53)
11. The Karmic Wheel (2:00)
12. The Romance of the Princess (1:55)
13. Deng Zhi (0:56)
14. Wei Funeral (3:03)
15. Shu Requiem (2:51)
16. Returning the Sword (2:35)
17. The Duel (5:43)
18. Zhao Army (1:56)
19. Battle on the Phoenix Height (3:25)
20. After the Snow (3:02)
21. Resurrection of the Dragon (2:24)
22. Zhao Zilong (2:26)

== Awards ==
28th Hong Kong Film Awards

- Nominated: Best Cinematography (Tony Cheung)
- Nominated: Best Art Direction (Daniel Lee & Horace Ma)
- Nominated: Best Costume Make Up Design (Thomas Chong & Wong Ming-na)
- Nominated: Best Action Choreography (Sammo Hung & Yuen Tak)
- Nominated: Best Original Film Score (Henry Lai Wan-man)

3rd Asian Film Awards

- Won: Best Production Designer (Daniel Lee)
- Nominated: Best Composer (Henry Lai Wan-man)

== Significance ==
Dr. Ruby Cheung, the author of "Red Cliff: The Chinese-language Epic and Diasporic Chinese Spectators," described this film as one of the "immediate precedents" of the film Red Cliff.

== Release ==
The world premiere of the film occurred at the CGV Yongsan Theater in central Seoul, South Korea, on Monday 31 March 2008. The main actors, Andy Lau and Maggie Q, director Daniel Lee, and crew member Sammo Hung. Many of Lau's fans waited for him outside of the CGV Yongsan; as of 2008 Lau is very popular in East Asian countries.

The film was broadcast on Iran's National TV during Nowruz 2008.

== Reception ==
Derek Elley of Variety wrote that the "[t]ightly cut movie has almost no downtime but also no sense of rush" and that the cast "is relatively clearly defined, and details of costuming, armor and massive artillery have a fresh, unfamiliar look." Elley added that the music "motors the picture and gives it a true heroic stature."

There was controversy regarding the costumes worn by the cast, as some critics argued that Zhao Zilong's armour resembles the samurai's. Lee responded, saying that elements from Japanese soldier costumes originated from Chinese soldier costumes, so one should not be surprised that they appear like Japanese soldier costumes. In addition, some critics said that Maggie Q, an American actress, was not suitable to be placed in a Chinese period piece, due to her Eurasian appearance. Lee argued that "We didn't find it a problem at all, as historically inter-ethnic marriages were a strategy of matrimonial alliances, commonly adopted by China's rulers to establish peace with the aggressive neighbouring, non-Chinese tribes."

== See also ==
- List of historical drama films of Asia
- List of media adaptations of Romance of the Three Kingdoms
- Andy Lau filmography
- Sammo Hung filmography
