= Empress Zhang (Liu Shan's second wife) =

Chinese Empress of Shu Han from 238 to 263

Empress Zhang 張皇后

Empress consort of Shu Han
- Tenure: February 238 – December 263
- Predecessor: Empress Jing'ai
- Born: Unknown
- Died: Unknown
- Spouse: Liu Shan
- Father: Zhang Fei
- Mother: Unknown (Note: It is not recorded which of the daughters (the elder or the younger) of Zhang Fei was the mother of the boy that Liu Shan commented was related to Xiahou Ba.)

Empress Zhang (fl.221 – 264), personal name unknown, was the last empress of the state of Shu Han in the Three Kingdoms period. She was a daughter of the Shu general Zhang Fei, and was a younger sister of Empress Jing'ai. In 237, she became an Imperial Consort (Chinese: 貴人; pinyin: guìrén) of the Shu emperor Liu Shan. She became empress in February 238, succeeding her elder sister, who had died in the previous year.

== Life ==
Empress Zhang's father was the famous general Zhang Fei. She was the sister of Empress Jing'ai and Zhang Bao. She was brought to the harem in 237 as an honourable lady; in February 238, with Liu Shan making arrangements within the family including declaring his heir, she succeeded her late sister, with Xiang Lang sent to bestow the seal of office.

In 249, following Sima Yi's coup d'etat against Cao Shuang, a fellow regent of Cao Wei, Sima Yi recalled Xiahou Ba and famed relative Xiahou Xuan to the capital while sending Ba's rival Guo Huai to become commander in the west. While Xiahou Xuan accepted the orders, Xiahou Ba fled to Shu-Han despite his father's death fighting Shu-Han. With Ba badly injured in Hanzhong, Liu Shan sought to smooth potential tensions by pointing to a son (unclear which one) of Xiahou maternal blood to show they were kin and treated Xiahou Ba generously.

In 264, after Shu Han was conquered by the rival state of Cao Wei, Empress Zhang accompanied Liu Shan and her entire family to the Wei capital Luoyang.

== In popular culture ==
Empress Zhang is first introduced as a playable character in the fifth instalment of Koei's Dynasty Warriors video game series. She was omitted from 6, but was reintroduced in 7 and has been present since. She is given the fictional name "Xingcai" (星彩) in the games. Although there is no mention of her sister throughout the series, the Scholar Quiz of Dynasty Warriors 7 confirms that Xingcai is the second empress of Liu Shan.

== See also ==
- Shu Han family trees
- Lists of people of the Three Kingdoms

== Notes ==
Chinese royalty
Preceded by Empress Jing'ai	Empress of Shu Han; 238–263	Dynasty ended
Preceded by Empress Jing'ai	Empress of China (Southwestern); 238–263	Succeeded by Empress Bian of Cao Wei
