= Zhang Fei =

Chinese military general (died 221)

- 張飛
- Ming dynasty portrait of Zhang Fei

General of Chariots and Cavalry (車騎將軍)
- In office 221
- Monarch: Liu Bei

Colonel-Director of Retainers (司隸校尉)
- In office 221
- Monarch: Liu Bei
- Succeeded by: Zhuge Liang

General of the Right (右將軍)
- In office 219 – 221
- Monarch: Liu Bei

Administrator of Baxi (巴西太守) (under Liu Bei)
- In office 214 – 219
- Monarch: Emperor Xian of Han

Administrator of Nan Commandery (南郡太守) (under Liu Bei)
- In office ? – 214
- Monarch: Emperor Xian of Han

Administrator of Yidu (宜都太守) (under Liu Bei)
- In office ?–?
- Monarch: Emperor Xian of Han

General Who Attacks Barbarians (征虜將軍) (under Liu Bei)
- In office 209 – ?
- Monarch: Emperor Xian of Han

General of the Household (中郎將) (under Liu Bei)
- In office 199 – 209
- Monarch: Emperor Xian of Han

Personal details
- Born: Unknown Zhuo Commandery, Han Empire
- Died: July or August 221 (Note: Liu Bei's biography in the Sanguozhi recorded that Zhang Fei died in the 6th month of the 1st year of the Zhangwu era of Liu Bei's reign. This month corresponds to 8 July to 5 August 221 in the Julian and the Proleptic Gregorian calendars.) Langzhong County, Baxi Commandery, Shu Han
- Spouse: Lady Xiahou
- Children: Empress Jing'ai; Empress Zhang; Zhang Bao; Zhang Shao
- Occupation: Military general, politician
- Courtesy name: Yide (益德)
- Posthumous name: Marquis Huan (桓侯)
- Peerage: Marquis of Xixiang (西鄉侯)
- Deity name: Huan Hou Da Di (桓侯大帝; "Marquis Huan the Great")

Zhang Fei
- "Zhang Fei" in Traditional (top) and Simplified (bottom) Chinese characters
- Traditional Chinese: 張飛
- Simplified Chinese: 张飞
Transcriptions
Standard Mandarin
- Hanyu Pinyin: Zhāng Fēi
- Wade–Giles: Chang^{1} Fei^{1}
- IPA: [ʈʂáŋ féɪ]
Yue: Cantonese
- Yale Romanization: Jēung Fēi
- Jyutping: Zoeng^{1} Fei^{1}
- IPA: [tsœŋ˥ fej˥]
Southern Min
- Hokkien POJ: Tiu^{n} Hui
- Tâi-lô: Tiunn Hui

Zhang Fei (traditional Chinese: 張飛; simplified Chinese: 张飞; pinyin: Zhāng Fēi; died July or August 221 AD), courtesy name Yide (益德 (Note: Not the homophonous 翼德 as popularized by Romance of the Three Kingdoms.)), was a Chinese military general and politician serving under the warlord Liu Bei in the late Eastern Han dynasty and early Three Kingdoms period of China. Zhang Fei and Guan Yu, who were among the earliest to join Liu Bei, shared a brotherly relationship with their lord and accompanied him on most of his early exploits. Zhang Fei fought in various battles on Liu Bei's side, including the Red Cliffs campaign (208–209), takeover of Yi Province (212–214), and Hanzhong Campaign (217–218). He was assassinated by his subordinates in 221 after serving for only a few months in the state of Shu Han, which was founded by Liu Bei earlier that year.

Zhang Fei is one of the major characters in the 14th-century historical novel Romance of the Three Kingdoms, which dramatises and romanticises the events before and during the Three Kingdoms period. In the novel, Zhang Fei became sworn brothers with Liu Bei and Guan Yu in the fictional Oath of the Peach Garden at the start of the novel and remained faithful to their oath until his death.

== Early career ==
Zhang Fei was from Zhuo Commandery. In the 180s, towards the end of the Eastern Han dynasty, he and Guan Yu became Liu Bei's followers. As Guan Yu was several years older than Zhang Fei, Zhang regarded him as an elder brother. Guan Yu and Zhang Fei were known as stalwart and strong men; which made them talented fighters.

When Liu Bei was later appointed as the Chancellor of Pingyuan State (平原國) by the Han central government, Zhang Fei and Guan Yu served as Majors of Separate Command (別部司馬) under him. Liu Bei cherished them as if they were his own brothers, and the three of them shared a brotherly relationship to the point of sharing the same room, sleeping on the same mat and eating from the same pot. Zhang Fei and Guan Yu acted as bodyguards for Liu Bei. They followed him on his exploits and were always ready to face any danger and hardship.

== Conflict between Liu Bei and Lü Bu ==
In 194, Liu Bei succeeded Tao Qian as the Governor of Xu Province. The following year, he led his forces to Huaiyin County, to counter an invasion by Yuan Shu. During this time, he left Zhang Fei behind to guard Xiapi, the capital of Xu Province.

Zhang Fei wanted to kill Cao Bao, a former officer under Tao Qian, for reasons unknown. Cao Bao fled back to his own camp and set up defences while sending a messenger to request aid from Lü Bu, another warlord who was taking shelter under Liu Bei at the time. Lü Bu led his forces to attack Xiapi and succeeded in seizing control of Xiapi. Zhang Fei fled after losing Xiapi to Lü Bu. (Note: Another account stated that Zhang Fei killed Cao Bao in a quarrel. See the article on Cao Bao for details.)

Liu Bei returned to Xu Province, which was now under Lü Bu's control, and reluctantly accepted Lü Bu's offer to move to Xiaopei while Lü Bu remained in Xiapi. Tensions between Liu Bei and Lü Bu increased until the point of conflict. Liu Bei sought help from Cao Cao, a warlord who controlled the Han central government. Cao Cao and Liu Bei combined forces and defeated Lü Bu at the Battle of Xiapi in 198, after which they returned to the imperial capital Xu together. In Xu, Zhang Fei was appointed as a General of the Household (中郎將).

== Roaming the land with Liu Bei ==
In 199, Liu Bei pretended to volunteer to lead an army to attack Yuan Shu, and used that opportunity to leave Xu and escape from Cao Cao's watch. He headed to Xu Province, killed Che Zhou, the provincial governor appointed by Cao Cao, and seized control of Xiapi again. The following year, Cao Cao personally led his forces to attack Liu Bei, defeated him, and took back control of Xu Province. After his defeat, Liu Bei fled to Ji Province, where he took refuge under Cao Cao's rival, Yuan Shao.

Liu Bei later left Yuan Shao by pretending to help Yuan Shao gain support from local rebels in Runan in his war against Cao Cao. He eventually found shelter under Liu Biao, the Governor of Jing Province. Liu Biao put him in charge of Xinye County on the northern border of Jing Province.

It is not known whether Zhang Fei followed Liu Bei to join Yuan Shao after Liu Bei's defeat in Xu Province, or whether he, like Guan Yu, was separated from Liu Bei during that period of time.

== Red Cliffs campaign ==
=== Battle of Changban ===
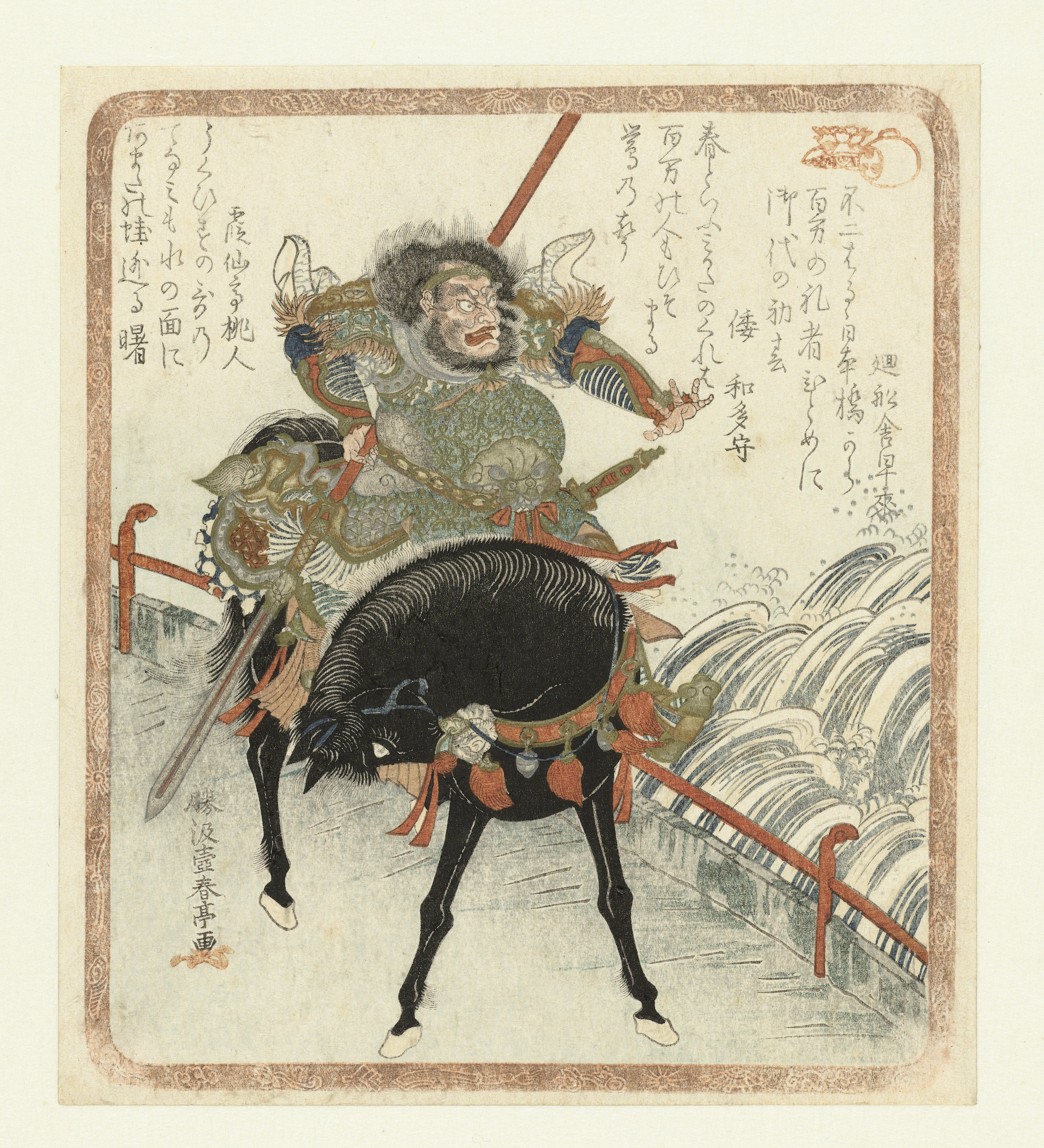
Zhang Fei in Japanese Ukiyo-e.

In 208, following Liu Biao's death, Cao Cao launched a military campaign aimed at wiping out opposing forces in Jing Province and the Jiangdong (or Wu) region. In the meantime, Liu Bei evacuated Xinye County and led his followers towards Xiakou, which was controlled by Liu Biao's elder son, Liu Qi.

Cao Cao was worried that Liu Bei would occupy Jiangling County, which was abundant in military resources, before he did. He immediately ordered his troops to leave behind their heavy equipment and baggage, and move swiftly to Xiangyang. When Cao Cao reached Xiangyang, Liu Biao's younger son and successor, Liu Cong, surrendered to him without putting up resistance. After learning that Liu Bei had already passed by Xiangyang, Cao Cao personally led a 5,000-strong elite cavalry force to pursue Liu Bei. After travelling over 300 li in just one day and one night, Cao Cao and his riders caught up with Liu Bei at Changban and attacked him. During the battle, Liu Bei abandoned his family and fled, with only Zhuge Liang, Zhang Fei, Zhao Yun and a small number of soldiers accompanying him. Cao Cao's forces captured many of Liu Bei's followers and his equipment.

Zhang Fei led 20 horsemen to cover Liu Bei's retreat. After destroying a bridge, he stood guard at one end (facing the enemy), brandished his spear, glared at the enemy and shouted: "I'm Zhang Yide. You can come forth and fight me to the death!" Cao Cao's soldiers were all afraid and did not dare to approach him. Liu Bei and his followers were hence able to retreat safely.

=== Battle of Red Cliffs and after ===
In 208, Liu Bei and Sun Quan combined forces and defeated Cao Cao at the decisive Battle of Red Cliffs. Liu Bei later took control of southern Jing Province, with his headquarters at Nan Commandery and Gong'an County. Zhang Fei was appointed General Who Attacks Barbarians (征虜將軍) and Administrator (太守) of Yidu Commandery. He was also enfeoffed as the Marquis of Xin Village (新亭侯). He was later reassigned to serve as the Administrator of Nan Commandery.

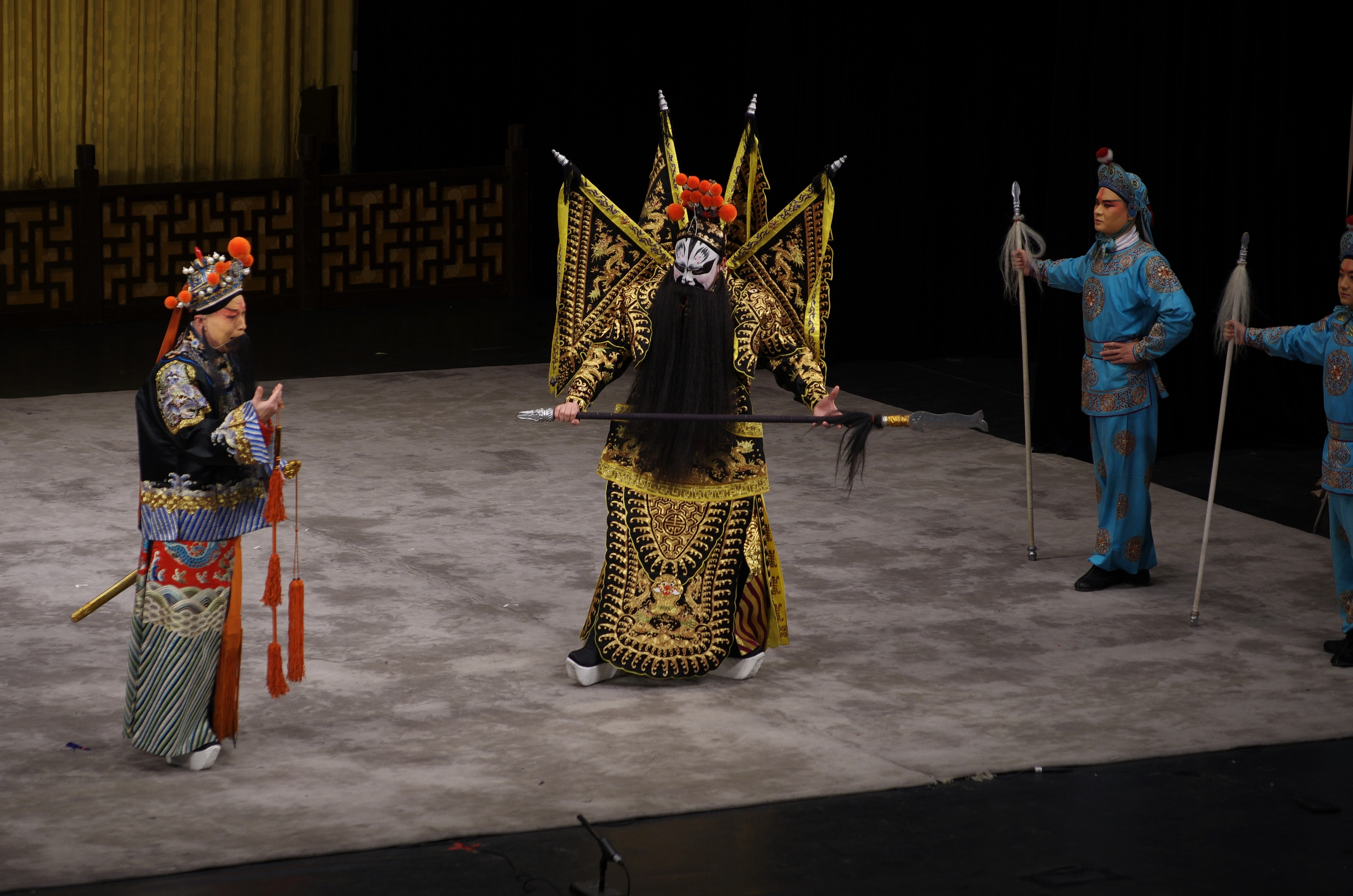
Zhang Fei (center) talks with Liu Bei, from a 2015 Peking opera performance by Shanghai Jingju Theatre Company at Tianchan Theatre, Shanghai.

== Yi Province campaign ==
=== Earlier defence of Jing Province ===
In 211, Liu Bei led an army to Yi Province to assist the governor Liu Zhang in countering the advances of a rival warlord, Zhang Lu of Hanzhong Commandery. He left Zhang Fei and others behind to guard Jing Province in his absence. Earlier in 209, Liu Bei married Sun Quan's younger sister Lady Sun to strengthen the alliance between him and Sun Quan. Because of her brother's strong influence, Lady Sun was arrogant and she allowed her close aides to behave lawlessly. Even Liu Bei was afraid of her. When Sun Quan heard that Liu Bei had left for Yi Province, he sent a vessel to Jing Province to fetch his sister home. Lady Sun attempted to bring along Liu Bei's son Liu Shan with her, but Zhang Fei and Zhao Yun led their men to stop her and managed to retrieve Liu Shan.

=== Conquest of Yi Province ===
Around 212, relations between Liu Bei and Liu Zhang deteriorated to the point of conflict, when Liu Bei started a campaign aimed at seizing Yi Province from Liu Zhang. Liu Bei ordered Zhuge Liang, Zhao Yun, Zhang Fei and others to lead reinforcements into Yi Province to help him, while Guan Yu remained behind to defend Jing Province. When Liu Zhang heard that Liu Bei received reinforcements from Jing Province, he dispatched Zhang Yi (Junsi) with an army to stop them at Deyang County. However, Zhang Fei defeated them and forced Zhang Yi to withdraw back to Chengdu.

Along the way, Zhang Fei attacked Jiangzhou, which was defended by Zhao Zan (趙筰) the Administrator of Ba Commandery along with his more famous subordinate Yan Yan, a military officer serving under Liu Zhang. He defeated both of them and captured Yan Yan alive. Zhang Fei asked him: "When my army showed up, why did you put up resistance instead of surrendering?" Yan Yan replied: "You people launched an unwarranted attack on my home province. There may be generals in my province who will lose their heads, but there are none who will surrender." Zhang Fei was enraged and he ordered Yan Yan's execution. An expressionless Yan Yan asked: "If you want to chop off my head, then do it! What's with that outburst of anger?" Zhang Fei was so impressed with Yan Yan's courage that he released him and treated him like an honoured guest.

Zhang Fei's army then proceeded to break through Liu Zhang's defences until they reached Chengdu (Yi Province's capital), where they rendezvoused with Liu Bei and the others. In 214, Liu Zhang surrendered and yielded Yi Province to Liu Bei. Liu Bei rewarded Zhuge Liang, Fa Zheng, Zhang Fei and Guan Yu each with 500 jin of gold, 1,000 jin of silver, 50 million coins and 1,000 rolls of silk. Zhang Fei was also appointed as the Administrator (太守) of Baxi Commandery.

== Hanzhong Campaign ==
=== Battle of Baxi ===
In around 215, Cao Cao attacked and defeated Zhang Lu, after which Hanzhong Commandery came under his control. Cao Cao left Xiahou Yuan, Zhang He and others behind to defend Hanzhong while he returned to Ye.

During that time, Zhang He led his forces to attack Baxi Commandery with the aim of forcing Baxi's residents to relocate to Hanzhong Commandery. His army passed through Dangqu (宕渠), Mengtou (蒙頭) and Dangshi (盪石) counties, and encountered Zhang Fei's troops. Both sides held their positions for over 50 days, after which Zhang Fei led about 10,000 elite soldiers and took an alternative route to attack Zhang He. As the mountain paths were very narrow and inaccessible, Zhang He's army was effectively divided into two because the troops at the front and the rear were unable to contact and assist each other, resulting in a victory for Zhang Fei. Zhang He and about ten of his men escaped on foot through a shortcut and retreated to Nanzheng. Peace was restored in Baxi Commandery.

=== Conquest of Hanzhong ===
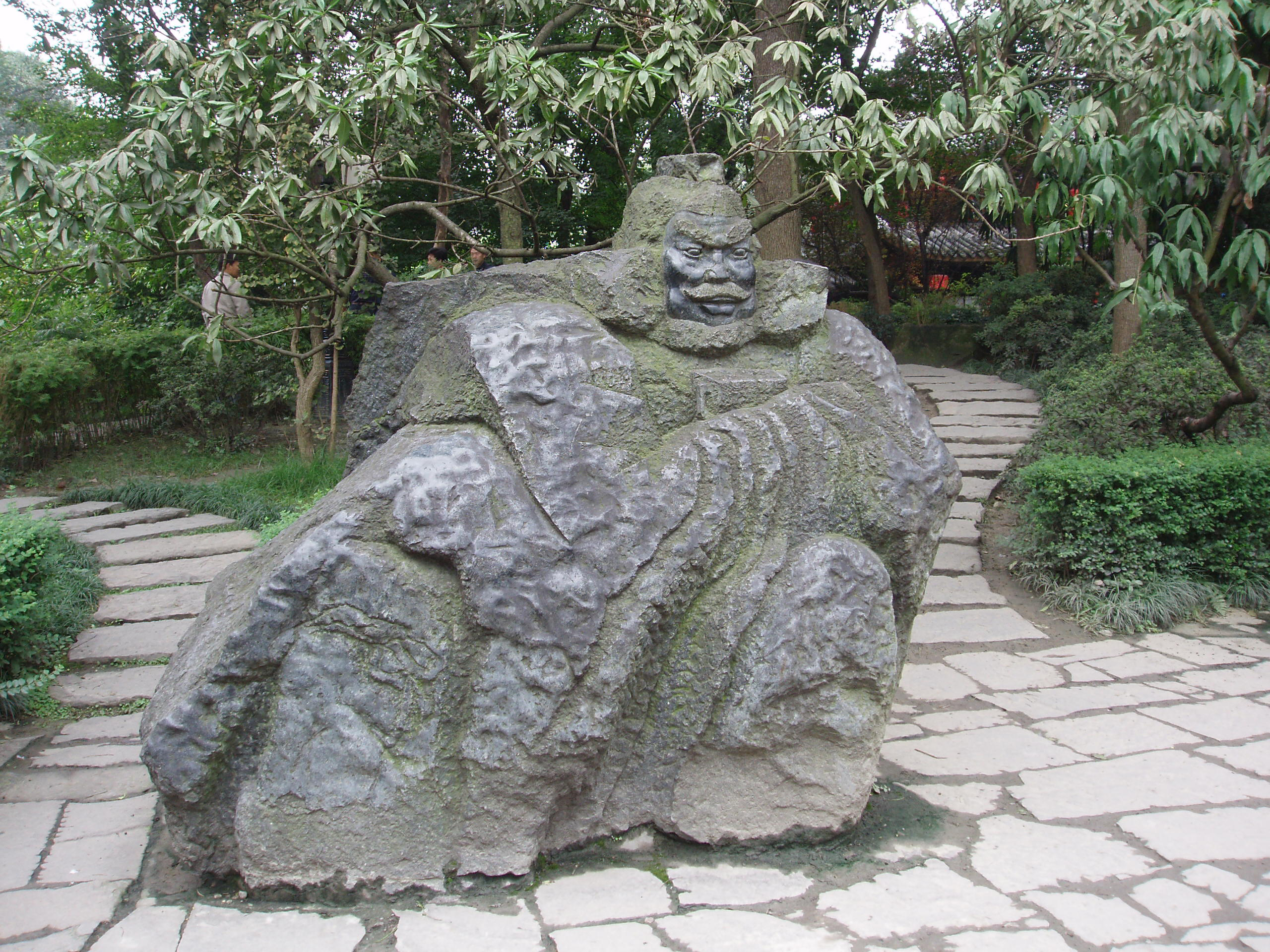
A statue of Zhang Fei in Zhuge Liang's temple in Chengdu, Sichuan.

In 217, Liu Bei mobilised his forces and personally led a campaign to seize control of Hanzhong Commandery from Cao Cao. He ordered Zhang Fei and Ma Chao to supervise Wu Lan (吳蘭), Lei Tong (雷銅) and Ren Kui (任夔) to attack Wudu Commandery, which was defended by Cao Hong. Zhang Fei attempted to trick Cao Hong into believing that they were planning to seal his retreat route, but Cao Xiu saw through the ruse, and Wu Lan suffered a major defeat which absolved Zhang Fei from continuing the campaign – Lei Tong and Ren Kui were killed in action while Wu Lan fled to Yinping Commandery (陰平郡) and was killed by a Di chieftain, Qiangduan (強端).

In 219, Liu Bei emerged victorious in the Hanzhong Campaign and proclaimed himself "King of Hanzhong" (漢中王). He appointed Zhang Fei as General of the Right (右將軍). Liu Bei later planned to return to Chengdu and he wanted to leave a veteran general behind to guard Hanzhong. Many people believed that Zhang Fei would receive this responsibility and even Zhang Fei himself thought so too. However, to everyone's surprise, Liu Bei chose Wei Yan instead and appointed him as the Administrator of Hanzhong.

== Service in Shu Han ==
In 221, Liu Bei declared himself emperor and founded the state of Shu Han. He promoted Zhang Fei to General of Chariots and Cavalry (車騎將軍) and Colonel-Director of Retainers (司隸校尉), and enfeoffed him as the Marquis of Xi District (西鄉侯).

Liu Bei sent an imperial edict to Zhang Fei as follows:

"I have received the Mandate of Heaven and inherited the noble work of my ancestors. I am obliged to restore peace and purge the Empire of chaos. As of now, there are villains and barbarians causing destruction and harm to the people, while those who miss the Han dynasty eagerly hope for its restoration. I feel distressed, I can neither rest well nor have my meals in peace. I have prepared the armies and made an oath to bring Heaven's punishment upon those evildoers. You are loyal and resolute, your deeds are comparable to those of Shao Hu, (Note: Duke Mu of Shao (召穆公), personal name Shao Hu (召虎), was a noble who lived in the Western Zhou dynasty during the reigns of King Li and King Xuan. He was known for assisting King Xuan in governing the state, and once led troops to defeat barbarian forces in the Huai River area.) your fame spreads near and far. As such, I give you special appointments, grant you a peerage, and put you in charge of affairs in the capital. You are born with Heaven's might, you use virtue to win over others, and you dish out punishments to wrongdoers. I am very pleased with you. The Classic of Poetry says: 'Not to distress the people, nor with urgency, but making them conform to the royal state. You have commenced and earnestly displayed your merit, and I will make you happy.' How can I not give encouragement to you?"

=== Death ===
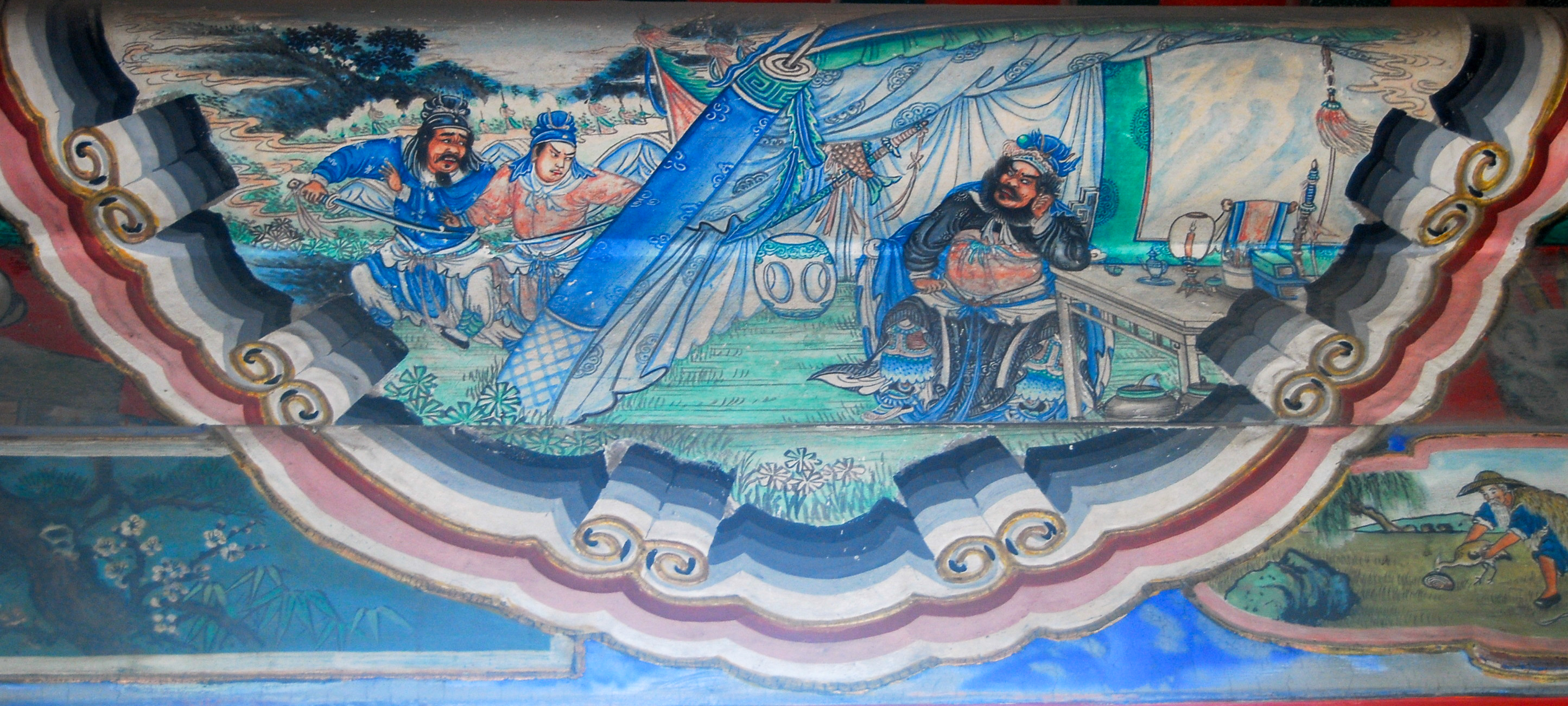
An illustration of Zhang Fei's assassination at the Long Corridor of the Summer Palace, Beijing.

Zhang Fei respected virtuous persons and detested those of vile character. Liu Bei had constantly warned Zhang Fei about his barbaric behaviour as he once told the latter: "You have dealt out far too excessive punishments. You often flog your men, who are actually the ones who will carry out your orders. Your behaviour will get you into trouble." Zhang Fei still did not change his ways.

Earlier in late 219, Sun Quan broke his alliance with Liu Bei and sent his general Lü Meng to lead an invasion of Liu Bei's territories in Jing Province, which resulted in the death of Guan Yu and his son, Guan Ping, in Linju (臨沮, present day Nanzhang County, Hubei). Around July or August 221, Liu Bei launched a campaign against Sun Quan to take revenge and seize back his territories in Jing Province. Zhang Fei was ordered to lead 10,000 troops from Langzhong to rendezvous with Liu Bei's main force at Jiangzhou.

During this mobilisation, two of his subordinates, Fan Qiang (范彊 (Note: Note that Fan's name is not the similar-looking character "Jiang" (疆).)) and Zhang Da (張達), before they were to advance, they killed Zhang Fei and decapitated him. The two then immediately defected to Wu and presented Zhang Fei's head to Sun Quan, who had already stationed himself at Xiaoting (猇亭, at the border of present-day Yidu County and Changyang County, Yichang, Hubei). The Records of the Three Kingdoms didn't record the reason why the two killed Zhang Fei, but based on previous records, it is inferred that the reason may be that they were also beaten by Zhang Fei and killed him because they could not bear to be beaten.

When Liu Bei heard that Zhang Fei's adjutant had sent him a report, he exclaimed: "Oh! Fei is dead."

In October or November 260, Liu Bei's son and successor Liu Shan granted Zhang Fei the posthumous name "Marquis Huan" (桓侯).

== Family and descendants ==
In the year 200, Zhang Fei chanced upon Xiahou Yuan's niece, Lady Xiahou, while she was out gathering firewood and abducted her. She was around 13 years old at the time by East Asian age reckoning. Zhang Fei knew that she was of good upbringing, so he married her. They had one daughter, (Note: It is not recorded which of the daughters (the elder or the younger) of Zhang Fei was the mother of the boy that Liu Shan commented was related to Xiahou Ba.) who later married Liu Shan and became Empress of the state of Shu. Empress Jing'ai had a younger sister who also married Liu Shan and was known as Empress Zhang.

Zhang Fei's eldest son, Zhang Bao, died at a young age. Zhang Bao's son, Zhang Zun (張遵), served as a Master of Writing (尚書). In 263, during the Conquest of Shu by Wei, he followed Zhuge Zhan to defend Mianzhu from the Wei general Deng Ai but was killed in action.

Zhang Fei's second son, Zhang Shao (張紹), inherited his father's marquis title and served as a Palace Attendant and Supervisor of the Masters of Writing (尚書僕射) in Shu. In 263, the Shu emperor Liu Shan ordered Zhang Shao, Qiao Zhou and Deng Liang (鄧良) to represent him when he officially surrendered to Deng Ai and brought an end to the Shu regime. After the fall of Shu, Zhang Shao accompanied Liu Shan to the Wei capital Luoyang, where he was enfeoffed as a marquis along with other former Shu officials.

== Appraisal ==
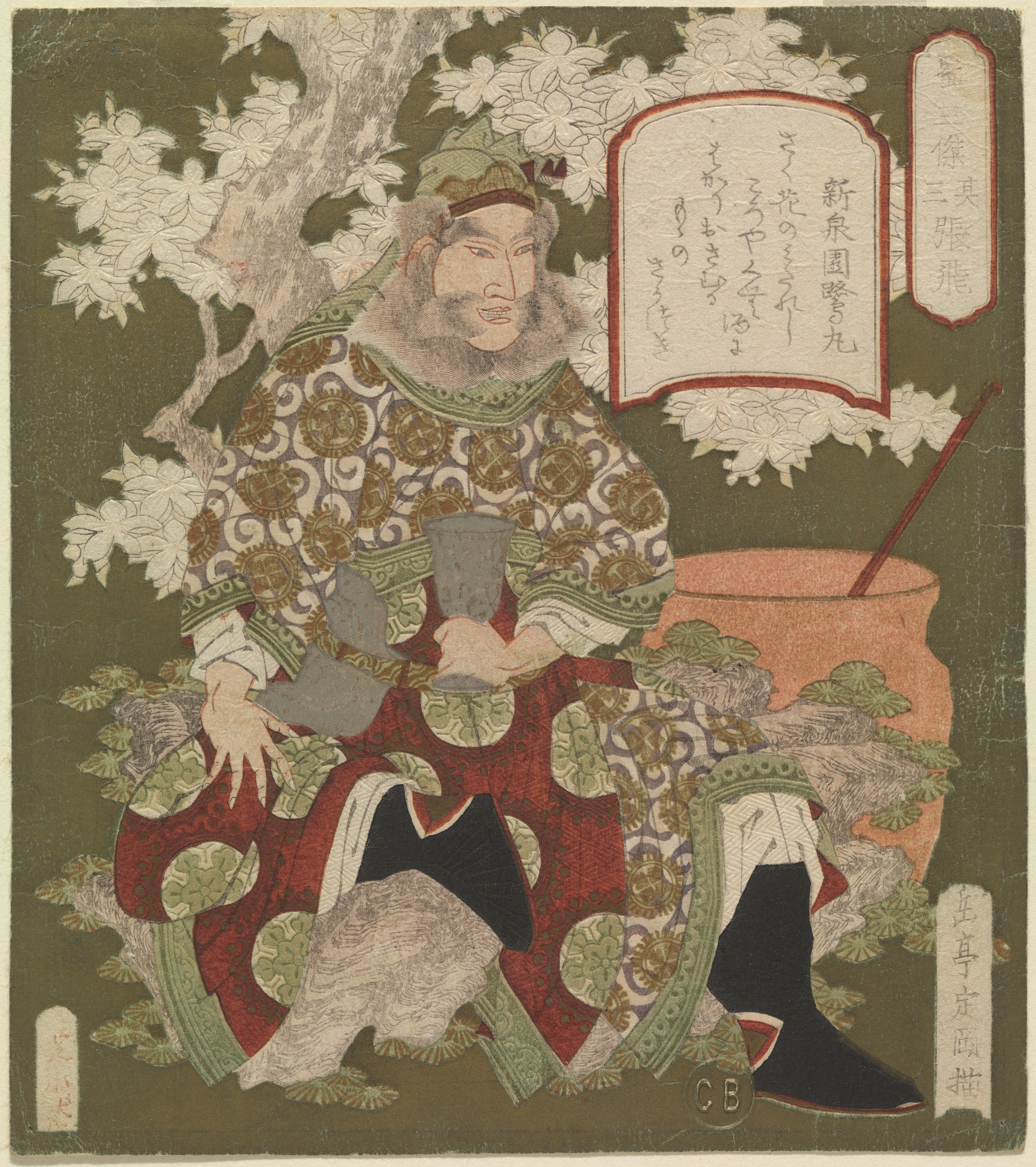
illustration of Zhang Fei by Yashima Gakutei in the Chester Beatty Library

Chen Shou, who wrote Zhang Fei's biography in the Sanguozhi, commented on the latter as follows: "Guan Yu and Zhang Fei were praised as mighty warriors capable of fighting ten thousand enemies (萬人敵). They were like tigers among (Liu Bei's) subjects. Guan Yu and Zhang Fei both had the style of a guoshi. (Note: Guoshi (國士) could loosely be translated as "gentleman of the state". It referred to persons who had made very outstanding contributions to their countries. See the dictionary definition of 國士.) Guan Yu repaid Cao Cao's kindness while Zhang Fei released Yan Yan out of righteousness. However, Guan Yu was unrelenting and conceited while Zhang Fei was brutal and heartless. These shortcomings resulted in their downfalls. This was not something uncommon."

Cheng Yu, an adviser to Cao Cao, once mentioned that Guan Yu and Zhang Fei were "capable of fighting ten thousand of enemies" (萬人敵). This assessment is also that of Guo Jia and Zhou Yu, as did another lesser-known official working for Cao Cao's state, Fu Gan (傅幹).

The Australian sinologist Rafe de Crespigny commented: "There are anecdotes describing Zhang Fei as a man of literary tastes who composed verse in the midst of battle, but he is more generally known as arrogant, impetuous and brutal. While Guan Yu was said to be harsh towards men of the gentry but treated his soldiers well, Zhang Fei was courteous towards the virtuous but cruel to his rank and file. The two men were nonetheless regarded as the finest fighting men of their lifetime."

== In Romance of the Three Kingdoms ==
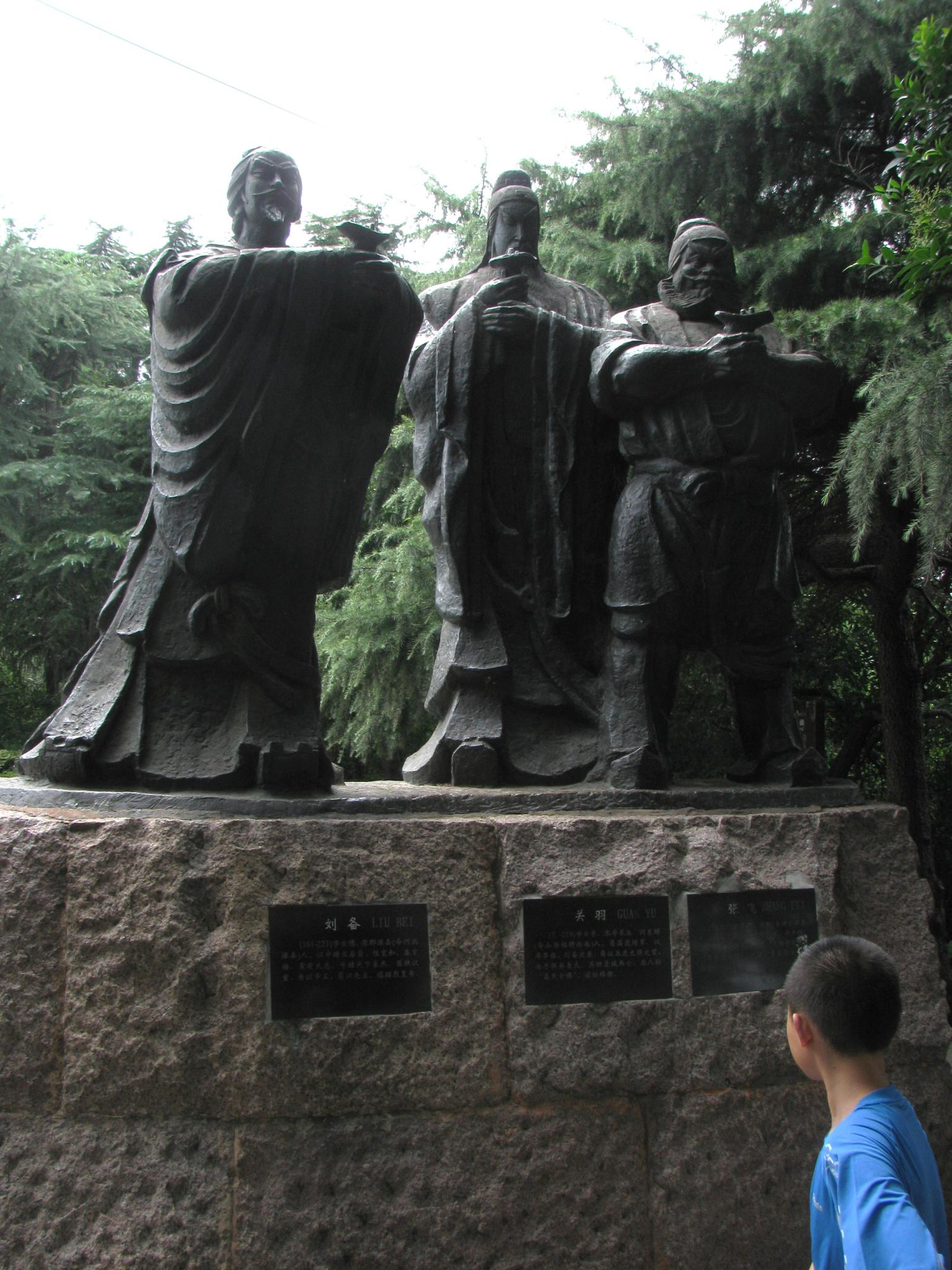
Statues of the three sworn brothers. From left to right: Liu Bei, Guan Yu, Zhang Fei.

In the historical novel Romance of the Three Kingdoms, Zhang Fei's physical appearance was described in the following: eight spans tall (身高八尺), had a head of a panther's and huge round eyes (豹頭環眼), a swallow's jowls and a tiger's beard (燕頷虎鬚)，a voice like thunder and a stance of a dashing horse (聲若巨雷 勢如奔馬). Zhang Fei's courtesy name is written as 翼德 in Chinese instead of 益德, but both names have the same pronunciation in Mandarin. Zhang Fei was also described to be an alcoholic, and his obsession with alcohol caused his judgment to be affected from time to time. Throughout the novel, Zhang Fei was depicted as an exceedingly loyal and formidable warrior, but also a short-tempered man, who often got into trouble when he was not on the battlefield. His weapon was a "1.8 Zhang length steel-piercing spear" (丈八點鋼矛), which was also called a "1.8 Zhang length Serpent spear" (丈八蛇矛), meaning "spear as long as a 1.8 zhang serpent" or later "1.8 zhang spear with serpent-shaped head".

See the following for some fictitious stories in Romance of the Three Kingdoms involving Zhang Fei:

- Oath of the Peach Garden
- Zhang Fei thrashes the imperial inspector
- Battle of Hulao Pass
- Battle of Changban
- Battle of Jiameng Pass

== In art ==
Dai Jin's Looking Three Times at the Thatched Hut (early Ming Dynasty), depicting Zhang Fei (right) with Guan Yu and Liu Bei at Zhuge Liang's thatched hut

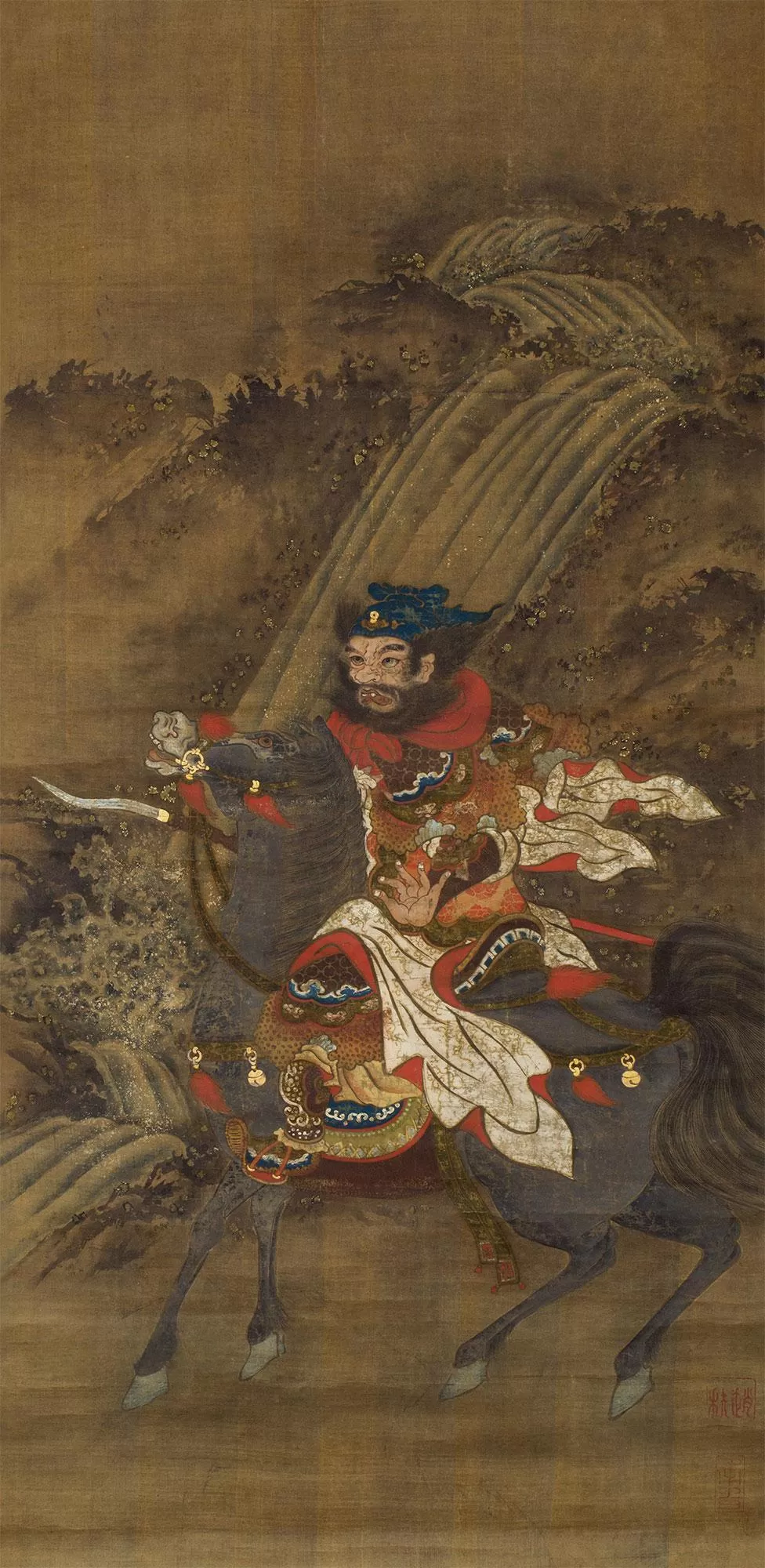
Portrait of Zhang Fei on horseback by Zhao Zhi (Ming Dynasty)

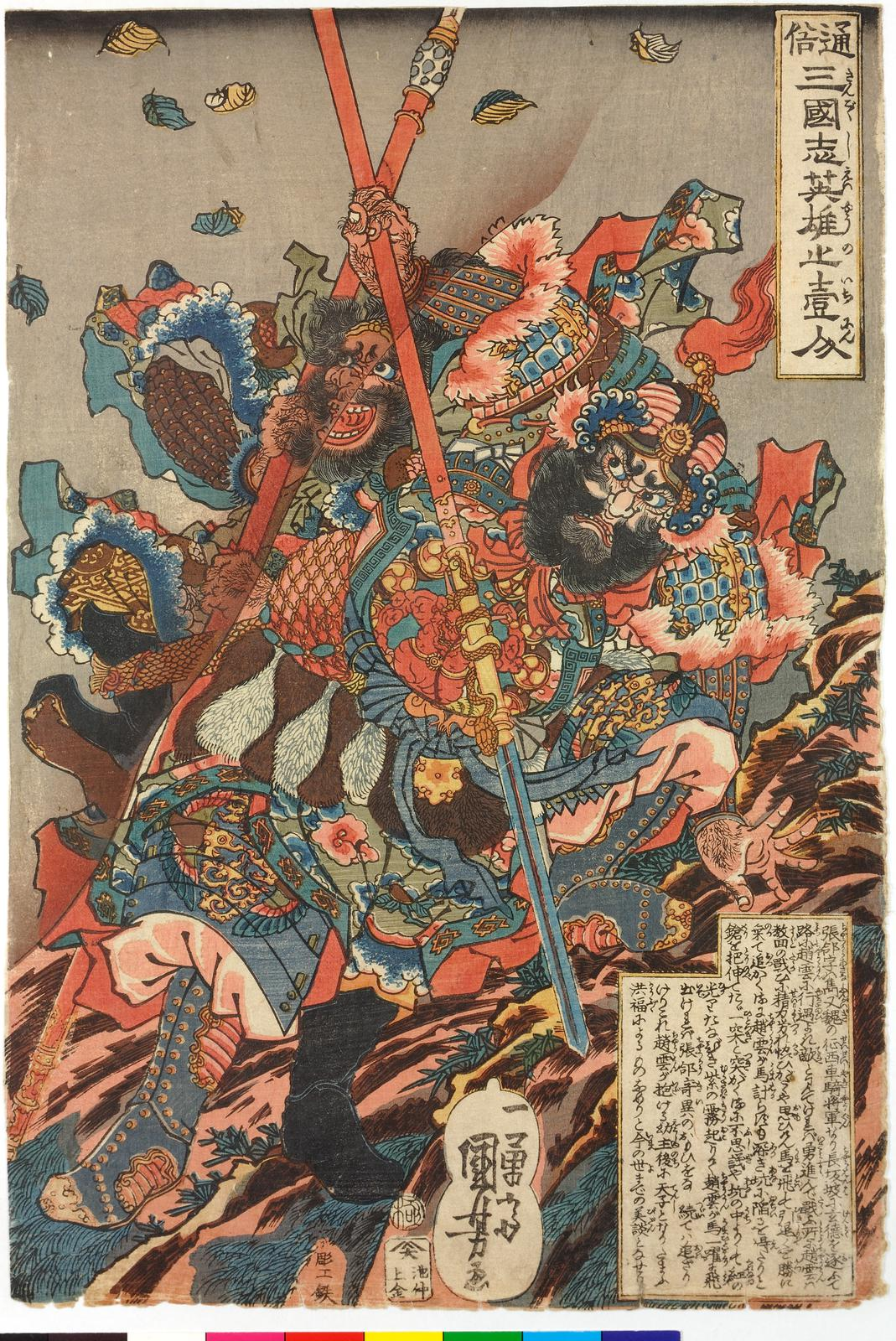
Zhang Fei dueling Zhao Yun in Utagawa Kuniyoshi's Heroes of the Popular History of the Three Kingdoms (c. 1836)

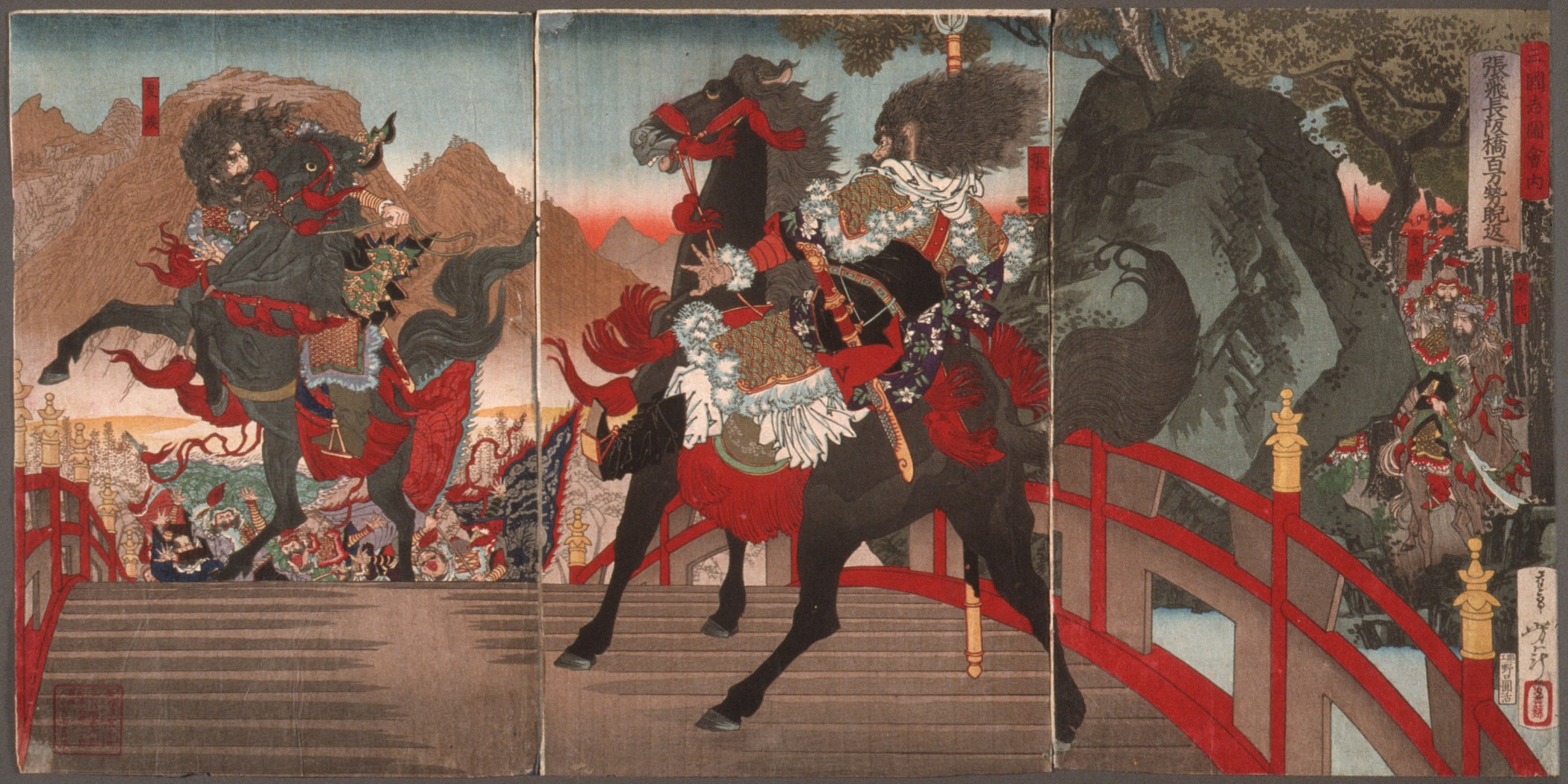
Tsukioka Yoshitoshi's Zhang Fei on the Long Sloped Bridge Turning Away One Million Wei Troops with a Powerful Stare (c. 1883)

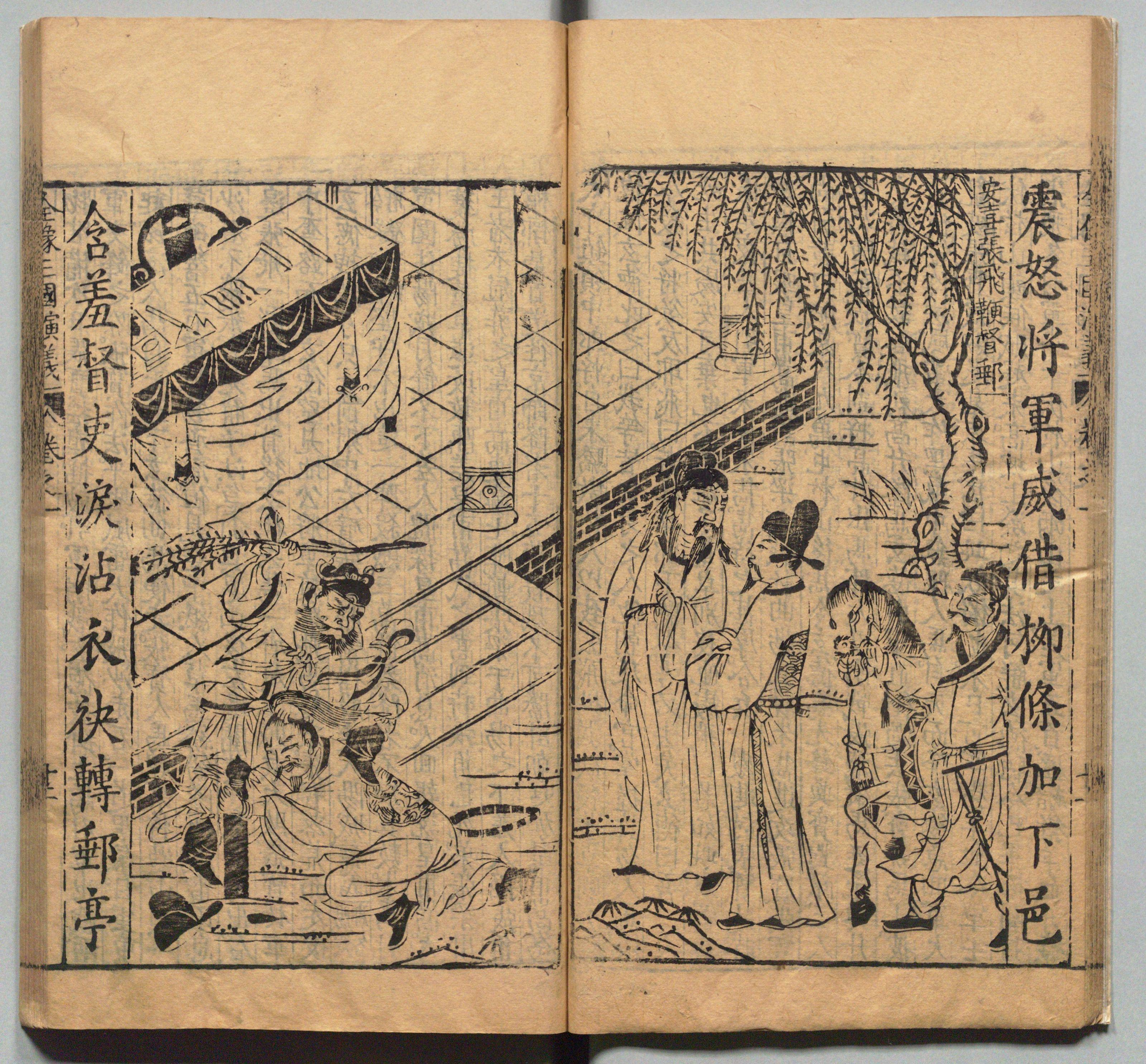
Zhang Fei whipping a government official, from a Ming Dynasty edition of Romance of the Three Kingdoms (c. 1591)

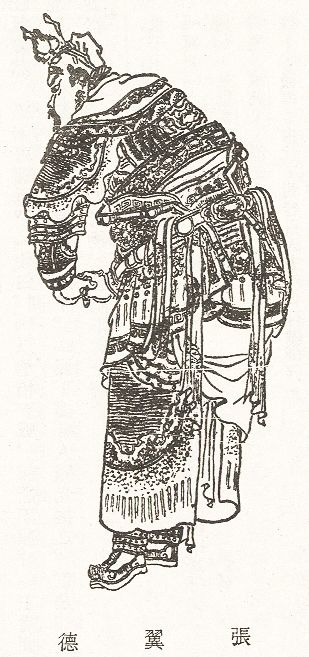
Portrait of Zhang Fei from a Qing Dynasty edition of Romance of the Three Kingdoms (19th century)

== In popular culture ==
Zhang Fei sometimes appears as a door god in Chinese and Taoist temples, partnered with Guan Yu.

Zhang Fei appears on the Kunqu stage as a hualian. In one particular famous scene, The Swaying Reeds, Zhang Fei ambushes and humiliates Zhou Yu before setting him free.

Zhang Fakui, a general in the National Revolutionary Army, was nicknamed "Zhang Fei". In 1959, Peng Dehuai, a marshal of the People's Liberation Army, identified himself with Zhang Fei. Because Mao Zedong was popularly associated with Cao Cao, Mao and other members of the Chinese Communist Party interpreted Peng's identification with Zhang as confrontational, eventually leading to Mao ending Peng's career.

Notable actors who have portrayed Zhang Fei in films and television series include: Li Jingfei in Romance of the Three Kingdoms (1994); Chen Zhihui in Three Kingdoms: Resurrection of the Dragon (2008); Zang Jinsheng in Red Cliff (2008–09); Kang Kai in Three Kingdoms (2010); Justin Cheung in Dynasty Warriors (2019).

Zhang Fei is featured as a playable character in all instalments of Koei's Dynasty Warriors video game series, as well as Warriors Orochi, a crossover between Dynasty Warriors and Samurai Warriors. He also appears in other video games produced by Koei, such as Romance of the Three Kingdoms, Dynasty Tactics and Kessen II. Other non-Koei titles that he is featured in include Heroes Evolved, Clash of Kingdoms, Three Kingdoms: Fate of the Dragon, Destiny of an Emperor and Koihime Musō.

The creative nonfiction travel essay 'Facing Zhang Fei: Hero or Villain or Man' featured in The Bangalore Review (April 2020). The narrative follows the movements of Australian writer Dean Kerrison in the ancient town Langzhong, Sichuan, which Zhang Fei governed and died in. The piece mixes insights of contemporary Chinese culture, critique relating to Zhang Fei and the Three Kingdoms period, and the theme of heroism including relevant personal anecdotes.

In the collectible card game Magic: The Gathering, there is a card named "Zhang Fei, Fierce Warrior" in the Portal Three Kingdoms set.

The Pokémon Emboar was based on Zhang Fei.

== See also ==
- Lists of people of the Three Kingdoms
