= Zhang Bao (Shu Han) =

3rd-century Chinese general serving Liu Bei

Zhang Bao 張苞
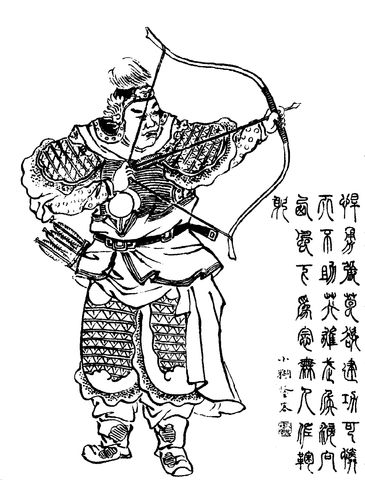
- A Qing dynasty portrait of Zhang Bao
- Born: Unknown
- Died: Unknown
- Children: Zhang Zun
- Father: Zhang Fei
- Relatives: Zhang Shao (brother); Empress Jing'ai (sister); Empress Zhang (sister)

Zhang Bao (fl. third century) was the eldest son of Zhang Fei, a general who served the warlord Liu Bei during the late Eastern Han dynasty and the state of Shu Han during the Three Kingdoms period of China. Little is known about Zhang Bao's life because Zhang Fei's biography in the historical text Records of the Three Kingdoms only mentioned that he was Zhang Fei's eldest son and that he died early.

Zhang Bao had a son, Zhang Zun (張遵), who served as a Master of Writing (尚書) in the Shu government and was killed in battle at Mianzhu in 263 during the Conquest of Shu by Wei. Zhang Bao also had a younger brother, Zhang Shao (張紹), who inherited their father's peerage and served as a Supervisor of the Masters of Writing (尚書僕射) in the Shu government. After the fall of Shu in 263, Zhang Shao was enfeoffed as a marquis by the Wei government along with many other former Shu officials who surrendered.

== In Romance of the Three Kingdoms ==
Zhang Bao appears as a character in the 14th-century historical novel Romance of the Three Kingdoms, which romanticises the historical events before and during the Three Kingdoms period. He makes his first appearance in the novel when he informs Liu Bei of his father's assassination just before the Battle of Yiling. Zhang Bao meets Guan Xing, Guan Yu's second son, and competes with him for the position of leading the vanguard force into battle. After nearly coming to blows, Zhang Bao and Guan Xing are stopped by Liu Bei, who forces them to become oath brothers in the same manner he did with their fathers many years ago. The two are regularly depicted together from that moment onwards.

In the novel, Zhang Bao is involved in several military campaigns, including the disastrous Battle of Xiaoting and Zhuge Liang's Northern Expeditions against Shu's rival state Wei. In the third Northern Expedition, Zhang Bao falls into a gully while pursuing the Wei generals Guo Huai and Sun Li, and later dies from the resulting injuries. When Zhuge Liang learns of Zhang Bao's death, he becomes so upset that he coughs blood and faints.

== Modern references ==
Zhang Bao is first introduced as a playable character in the eighth instalment of Koei's Dynasty Warriors video game series. In the ninth instalment, his mother is Xiahou Ji (Xiahou Yuan's niece and Zhang Fei's only known wife), making him a brother of Xingcai.

Zhang Bao's rivalry with Guan Xing and his involvement in the Northern Expeditions are depicted in the 2008 film Three Kingdoms: Resurrection of the Dragon.

== See also ==
- Lists of people of the Three Kingdoms
