= Cao Bao =

Eastern Han military officer (died 196)

- 曹豹

Chancellor of Xiapi (Note: At this point, Xiapi was also a state (国, "guo") without a Prince. The previous Prince of Xiapi was Liu Ying, who had the posthumous name of Prince Ai (下邳哀王刘宜). He died a few months after succeeding his father Liu Yi (posthumously known as Prince Min; 下邳愍王刘意) as Prince. Liu Yi himself was forced to flee from Xiapi during the Yellow Turban Rebellion. After the rebellion was quelled, his fiefdom was restored; Liu Yi died a few months after this restoration. The state was only abolished in 206 (11th year of the Jian'an era).) (下邳相)
- In office ? – 196
- Monarch: Emperor Xian of Han

Personal details
- Born: Unknown
- Died: 196 Pizhou, Jiangsu
- Occupation: Officer

Cao Bao (died 196) was a military officer serving under Tao Qian, the Governor of Xu Province, during the late Eastern Han dynasty of China. He became a subordinate of Tao Qian's successor, Liu Bei, after Tao's death in 194. He was killed by Zhang Fei in 196 after a quarrel.

== In historical records ==
The only known information about Cao Bao in history comes from Pei Songzhi's annotations to Chen Shou's Records of the Three Kingdoms (Sanguozhi), which recorded the history of the late Eastern Han dynasty and the Three Kingdoms period.

An annotation from the Yingxiong Ji (英雄記; "Records of Heroes", authored by Wang Can) in the Sanguozhi recorded:

"Liu Bei left Zhang Fei behind to defend Xiapi (下邳; Xu Province's capital) and led his troops to battle Yuan Shu at Shiting (石亭) and Huaiyin (淮陰). Cao Bao, a former officer under Tao Qian, remained in Xiapi. Zhang Fei wanted to kill Cao Bao (for reasons unknown). Cao Bao fled back to his own camp and strengthened his defences while sending a messenger to request aid from Lü Bu (who was taking shelter under Liu Bei then). Lü Bu attacked Xiapi and defeated Zhang Fei and drove him away."

Another annotation, also from the Yingxiong Ji, in the Sanguozhi, recorded a different account:

"[...] Xu Dan (許耽), who was from Danyang (丹楊) and was serving as a General of the Household (中郎將) under Liu Bei, sent a Major (司馬) to meet Lü Bu at night urgently, and said, "Zhang Yide (Zhang Fei) quarrelled with Cao Bao, the Chancellor (相) of Xiapi, and then killed him. The city is now in a state of chaos. [...]"

Sima Guang used the second account when he compiled the Zizhi Tongjian.

== In Romance of the Three Kingdoms ==
Cao Bao's conflict with Zhang Fei was dramatised in the 14th-century historical novel Romance of the Three Kingdoms.

In the novel, Cao Bao was Lü Bu's father-in-law. He was coerced by Zhang Fei to drink wine even though he insisted that he abstained from alcohol. When Cao Bao pleaded with Zhang Fei to stop forcing him to drink by asking the latter to "spare him in consideration of his son-in-law", Zhang became furious because he hated Lü Bu. He ordered his men to flog Cao Bao 50 times and only gave up when the other officers begged him to stop. Cao Bao bore a grudge against Zhang Fei for the beating, so he secretly contacted Lü Bu and assisted his son-in-law in seizing control of Xiapi. Zhang Fei was drunk when Lü Bu attacked the city so he lost the battle and fled from Xiapi. Cao Bao led about a hundred soldiers to pursue Zhang Fei but ended up being killed by the latter.

== See also ==
- Lists of people of the Three Kingdoms
