= Military history of the Three Kingdoms =

Military history of China between 189 and 280 CE

Timelapse of the Three Kingdoms era

The military history of the Three Kingdoms period encompasses roughly a century's worth of prolonged warfare and disorder in Chinese history. After the assassination of General-in-chief He Jin in September 189, the administrative structures of the Han government became increasingly irrelevant. By the time of death of Cao Cao, the most successful warlord of North China, in 220, the Han empire was divided between the three rival states of Cao Wei, Shu Han and Eastern Wu. Due to the ensuing turmoil, the competing powers of the Three Kingdoms era found no shortage of willing recruits for their armies, although press-ganging as well as forcible enlistment of prisoners from defeated armies still occurred. Following four centuries of rule under the Han dynasty, the Three Kingdoms brought about a new era of conflict in China that shifted institutions in favor of a more permanent and selective system of military recruitment. This ultimately included the creation of a hereditary military class as well as increasing reliance on non-Chinese cavalry forces and the end of universal conscription.

== Organization ==
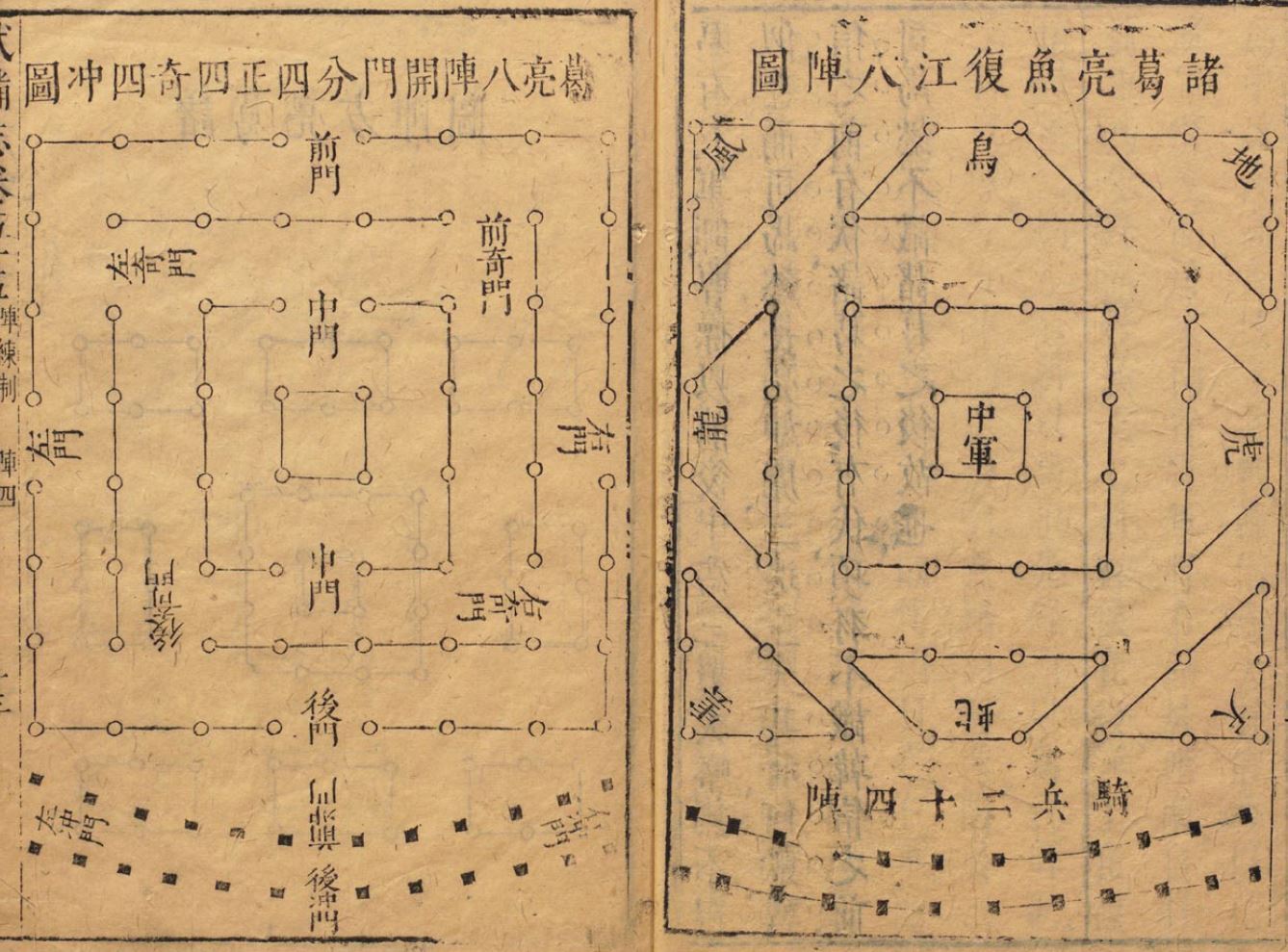
Diagram of the Eight Formation Plan (八陣圖), or "Eight Trigrams formation" (八卦陣) used by Zhuge Liang during military campaigns, from Wubei Zhi.

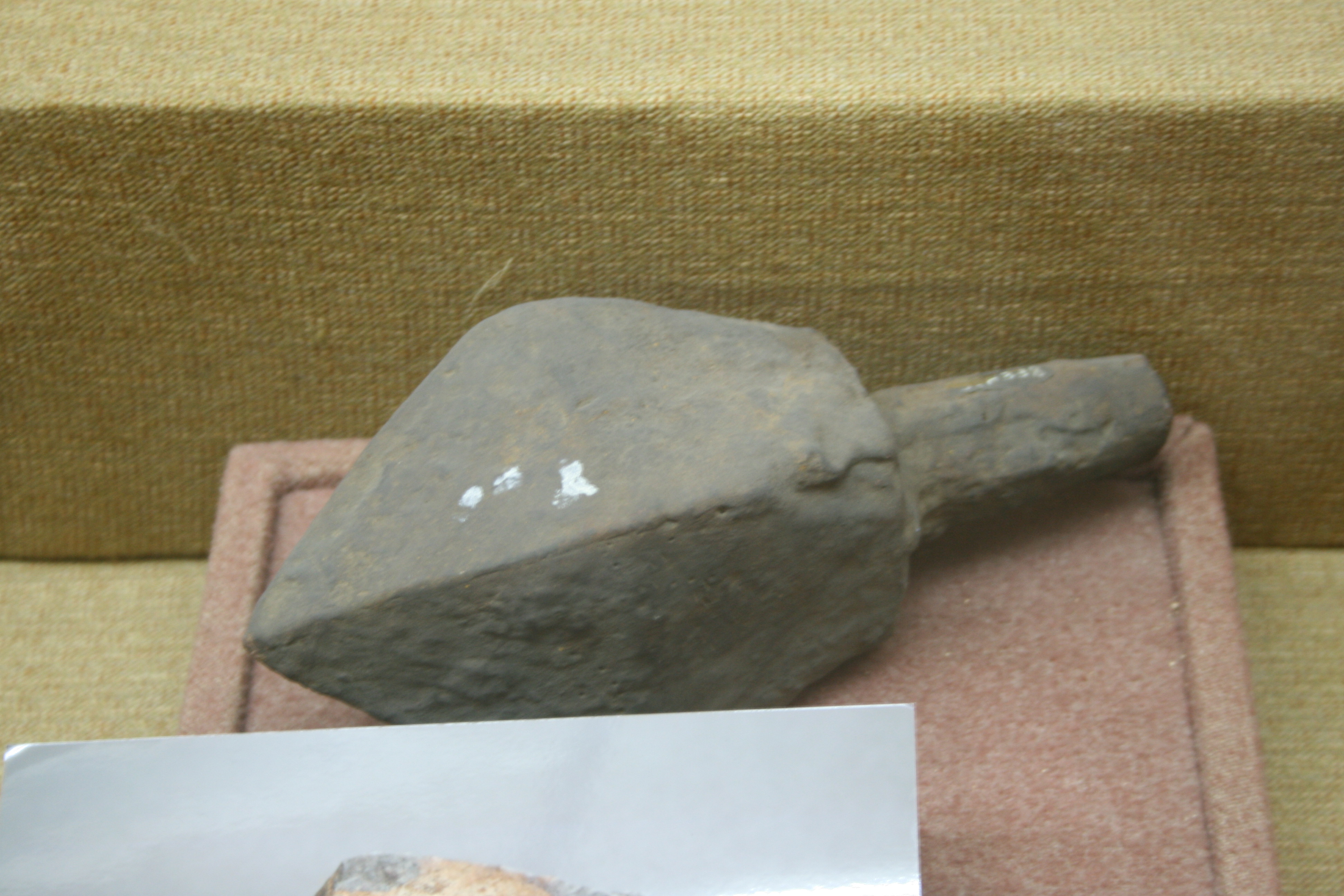
Battering ram of the Three Kingdoms

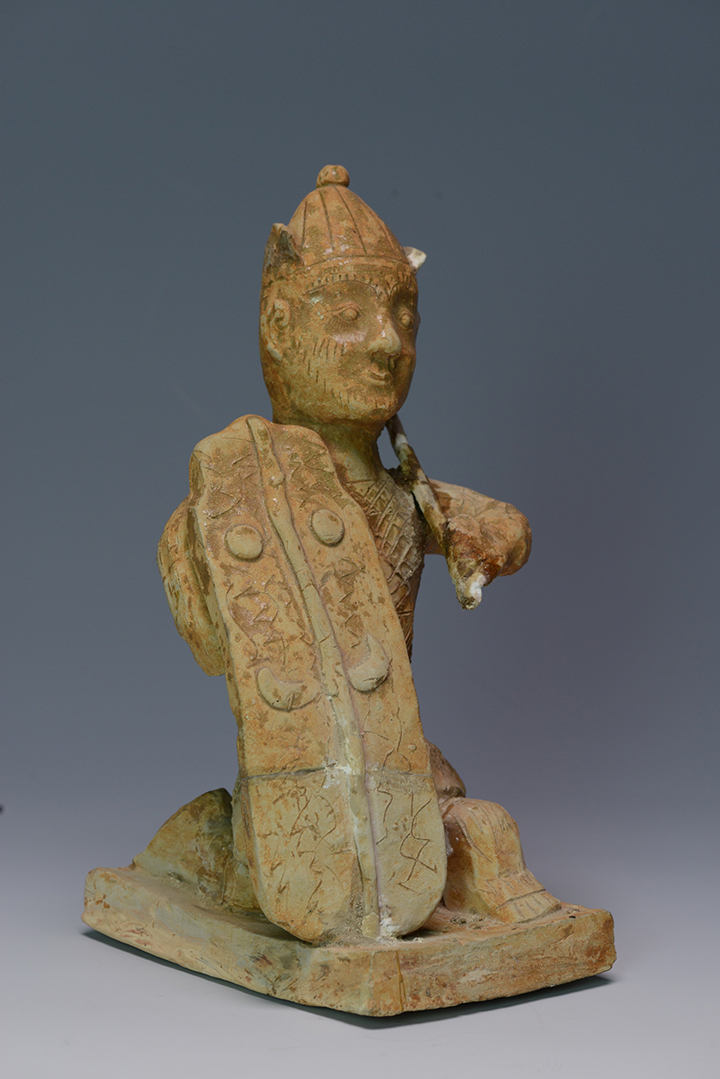
Wei or Jin shieldbearer

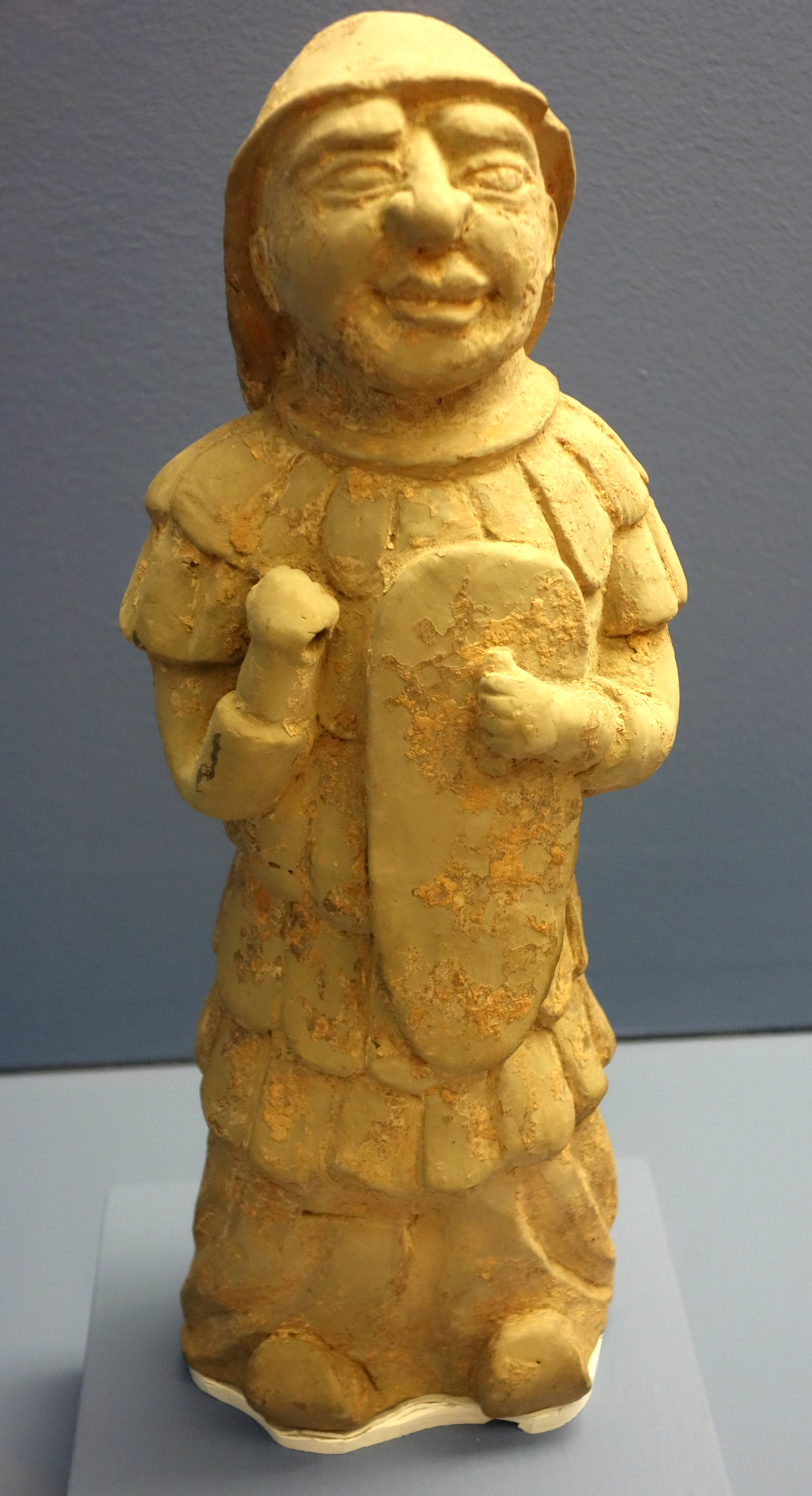
Warrior figurine, Six Dynasties period (220–589)

=== Recruitment and organization ===
As the Han dynasty fell into disarray after the Yellow Turban Rebellion, its system of conscription and checks on military leadership broke down, giving local leaders the autonomy to recruit their own personal armies. At the heart of each army was a group of trusted Companions (親近 qinjin) consisting of family members, close friends and clansmen hired by whatever means was available to their lord. Cao Cao's earliest commanders who formed the nucleus of his army were all clansmen (Cao Xiu, Cao Zhen, Cao Chun). There was no need for conscription as the conflicts of the late Han dynasty created willing recruits who sought protection under a strong army. This type of soldier, characterized by a lack of loyalty to state or nation, primarily concerned with survival, made up the majority of the army outside of the leader's close following. Due to the lack of loyalty among common troops, acts of heroism and courage were particularly emphasized among commanders who were expected to lead from the front. A typical example of this type of commander would be Dian Wei, a former local bully noted for his great strength, appetite, and his choice of weaponry, two halberds of immense weight, who served under Cao Cao. In 195, he personally led a group of volunteers clad in double armour (兩鎧 liang kai) against Lü Bu's forces while his liege made his escape. He was promoted to colonel of the bodyguard unit known as the Tiger Warriors and later met his death against Zhang Xiu in 197. While echoes of Han organization continued through the formal titles of military structure, in effect the wars of the Three Kingdoms were fought between armies of bands led by individuals selected by dint of violence and charisma.

=== Training ===
Military training programs for the general populace in the inner provinces were mostly discontinued after 30 AD to reduce the risk of rebellion. The total number of professional soldiers in standing armies in the Eastern Han, including all the smaller groups, amounted to approximately 20,000 soldiers. Expeditions and campaigns relied upon tens of thousands of troops from local militia armies and non-Chinese auxiliaries, supplemented by professional and semi-professional troops. The men in the inner provinces of the empire could be called to serve during emergencies or serve in local militias to fight against bandits, but these men received no formal training or regular exercise. On the other hand, men of the frontier provinces were liable for conscription and military service as before. This had a negative impact on the performance of the Han army, as noted by Ying Shao, who remarked that "sending [such] men into battle without training is just throwing them away". The majority of soldiers recruited during the early stages of the Three Kingdoms period were thus "neither disciplined nor well trained in the use of arms". Formations and drill still existed, but these were the exceptions rather than the norm, and there is no evidence of troops engaging in a regular training system or large scale exercises. Most commanders favored simple rather than complex formations and maneuvers. An example of a formation and drill that did exist is Zhuge Liang's Eight Formation Plan, which included different configurations named after Heaven, Earth, Wind, and Clouds. It is not clear what these designations mean, but the Eight Formation Plan was traditionally a square formation composed of nine divisions in three sections, used extensively by Zhuge Liang during his northern expeditions as well as for military training. The lack of training severely constrained the kind of orders a commander could give for his troops to follow. As a consequence of the limited tactical flexibility at their disposal, the majority of battles were carried out in one of two ways: a head on charge by elite shock troops followed by the loosely organized army of incoherent and disparately trained and equipped soldiers, or ambush and surprise the enemy before they could even respond and cause them to rout.

Yuan Shao moved to attack Gongsun Zan and the two sides met in battle twenty li south of Jie Bridge. Gongsun Zan had thirty thousand foot soldiers in square formation and ten thousand horsemen split into left and right wings. His White Cavalry Volunteers followed in the center. They split in two, the left riding right, and the right riding left. Their armour and flags shined with brilliance, lighting up heaven and earth. Yuan Shao sent Qu Yi against them with eight hundred soldiers while a thousand crossbowmen on either side supported his advance. Yuan Shao himself led tens of thousands of soldiers from the rear. Qu Yi had resided in Liangzhou for a long time and was familiar with the way of war as practiced by the Qiang tribes. Seeing Qu Yi's small force, Gongsun Zan sent cavalry to crush them. Qu Yi's troops hid behind their shields and made no move until the enemy were ten or twenty yards away; then they leapt up together, their cries shaking the ground, rushing forward with crossbows shooting bolts like thunder, killing all who were struck, and completely defeated Gongsun Zan's army...... killing more than a thousand armed men, Yuan Shao's troops maintained their pursuit to Jie Bridge. Gongsun Zan rallied his troops to turn and fight, but Qu Yi again defeated them. Reaching Gongsun Zan's camp, they captured his standard and the rest of his army took to flight.

— Sanguo Zhi

The training that the privileged elite received was far greater in extent compared to that of the common soldier. For example, Cao Cao's son, Cao Pi, started his military education in early childhood. He began training in archery at the age of five, started learning how to ride a horse at the age of six, and could both ride and shoot a target at a hundred paces by the time he was eight. Horse archery was also practiced in Shu Han, which fielded a "Flying Army" of mounted archers.

=== Hereditary troops ===
In contrast to the military hierarchy of the Han dynasty, leadership of a unit in the Three Kingdoms was functionally hereditary as long as the successor was loyal to his liege and proved militarily competent. When the commander died, a male member of his family inherited control of his troops, and when a soldier died one of his male relatives inherited his position in the unit. By the end of the Three Kingdoms, the term buqu (部曲) had come to designate the institution of hereditary military leadership. Both bu and qu, meaning battalions and companies, were originally units of military organization during the Han. Under Cao Cao, a more systematic form of hereditary soldiery was implemented through "military families" (士家 shijia) which later became "hereditary troops" (世兵 shibing). As their name implies, able male members born into military families served for life, and when they could no longer serve because of illness or death, their sons or close family members replaced them. Their families lived at the capital and other major centers where they could be used by the government as hostages to ensure the loyalty of their soldiers. They were also forbidden from marrying into non-military families in order to prevent their offspring from exiting the system, thus creating a closed community of military households. Although commoners could still be called up in times of urgent need, the rise of government mandated military communities under Cao Wei and the demobilization of local levies under the Jin dynasty, had by and large, replaced the universal conscription of the Han.

=== Tuntian ===
Tuntian, often rendered as "[military] agricultural colonies," were self-sustaining farming communities created for the purpose of providing food for the military. Generally consisting of displaced peoples, refugees, and bandits, tenants of a tuntian were expected to protect themselves in times of emergencies and in return were exempt from corvée labour. Unlike the tuntian system of the Han dynasty, which was generally hands off, the tuntian policy of the Three Kingdoms era was to directly provide them with supplies and material assistance. The policy of tuntian was implemented primarily by Cao Cao, Tao Qian, and Gongsun Zan.

== Equipment ==
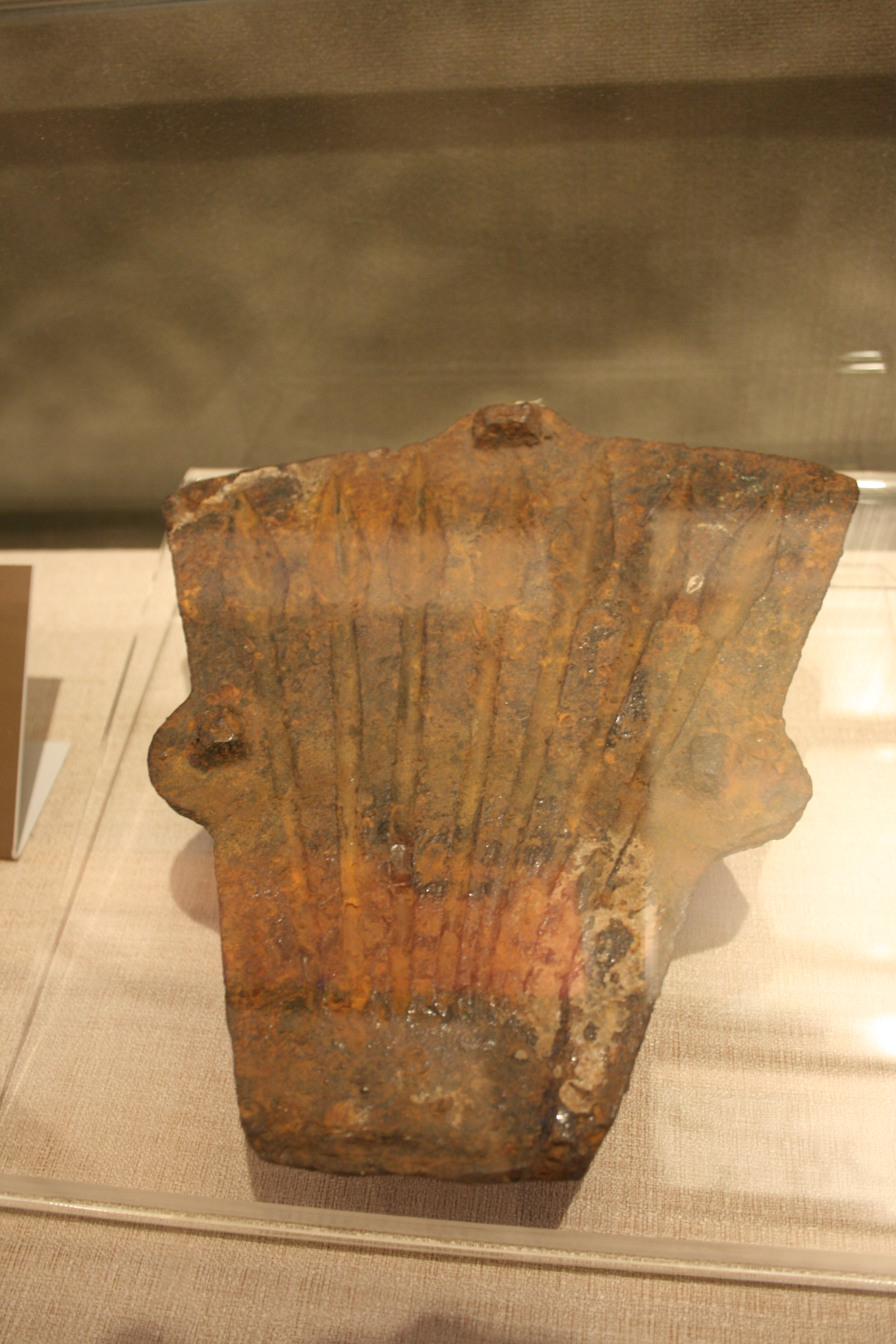
Three Kingdoms arrow mould

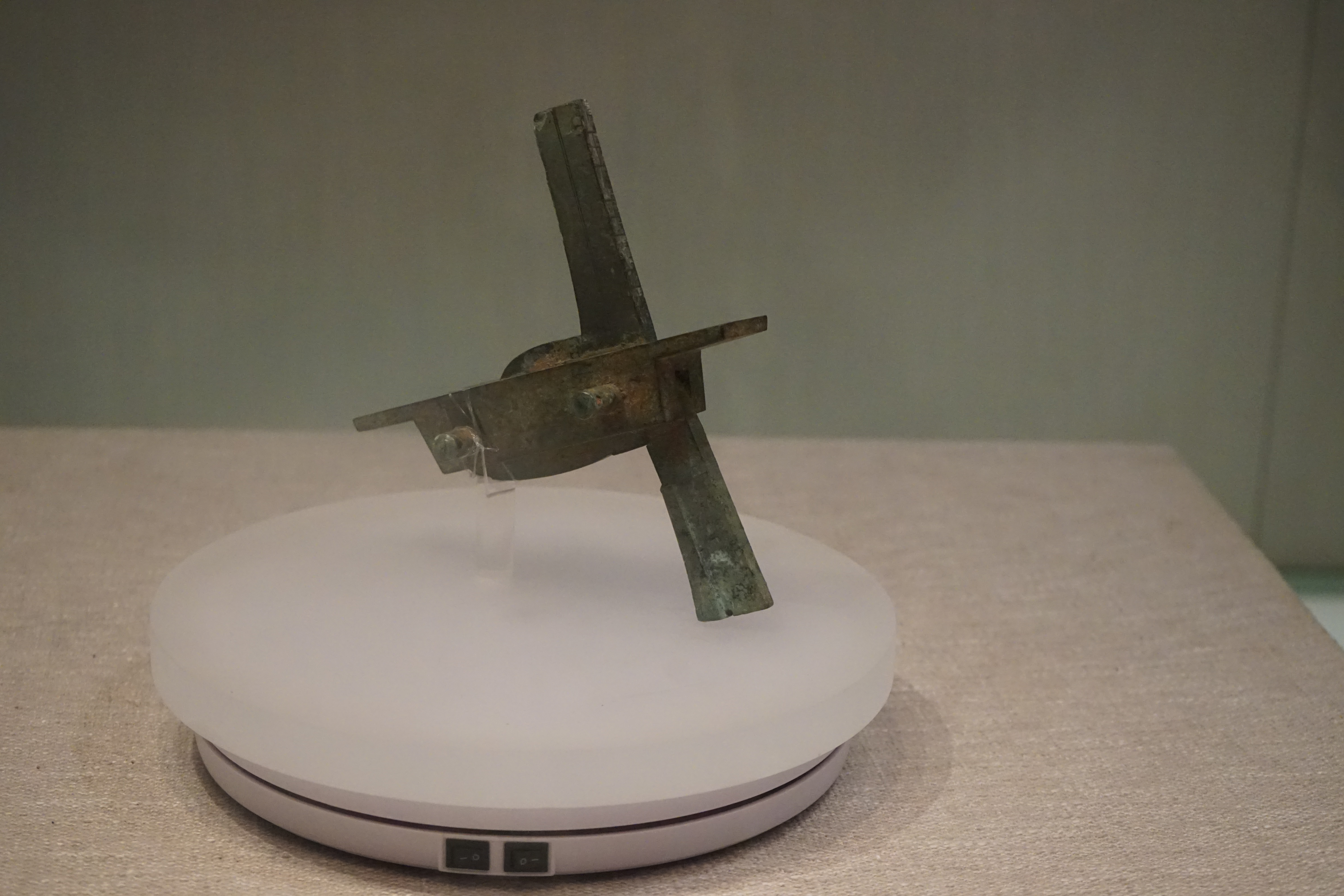
Three Kingdoms crossbow trigger

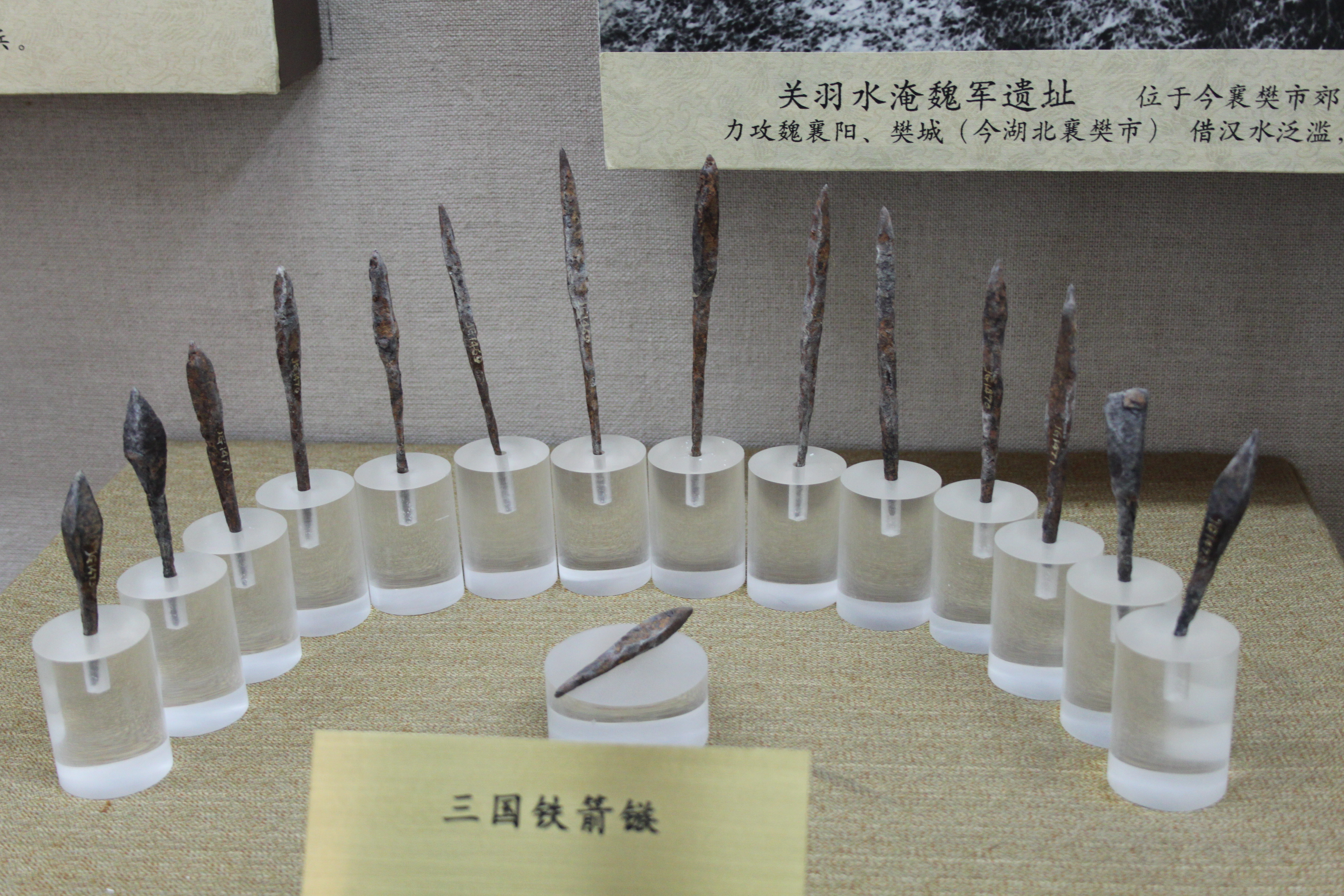
Three Kingdoms arrowheads

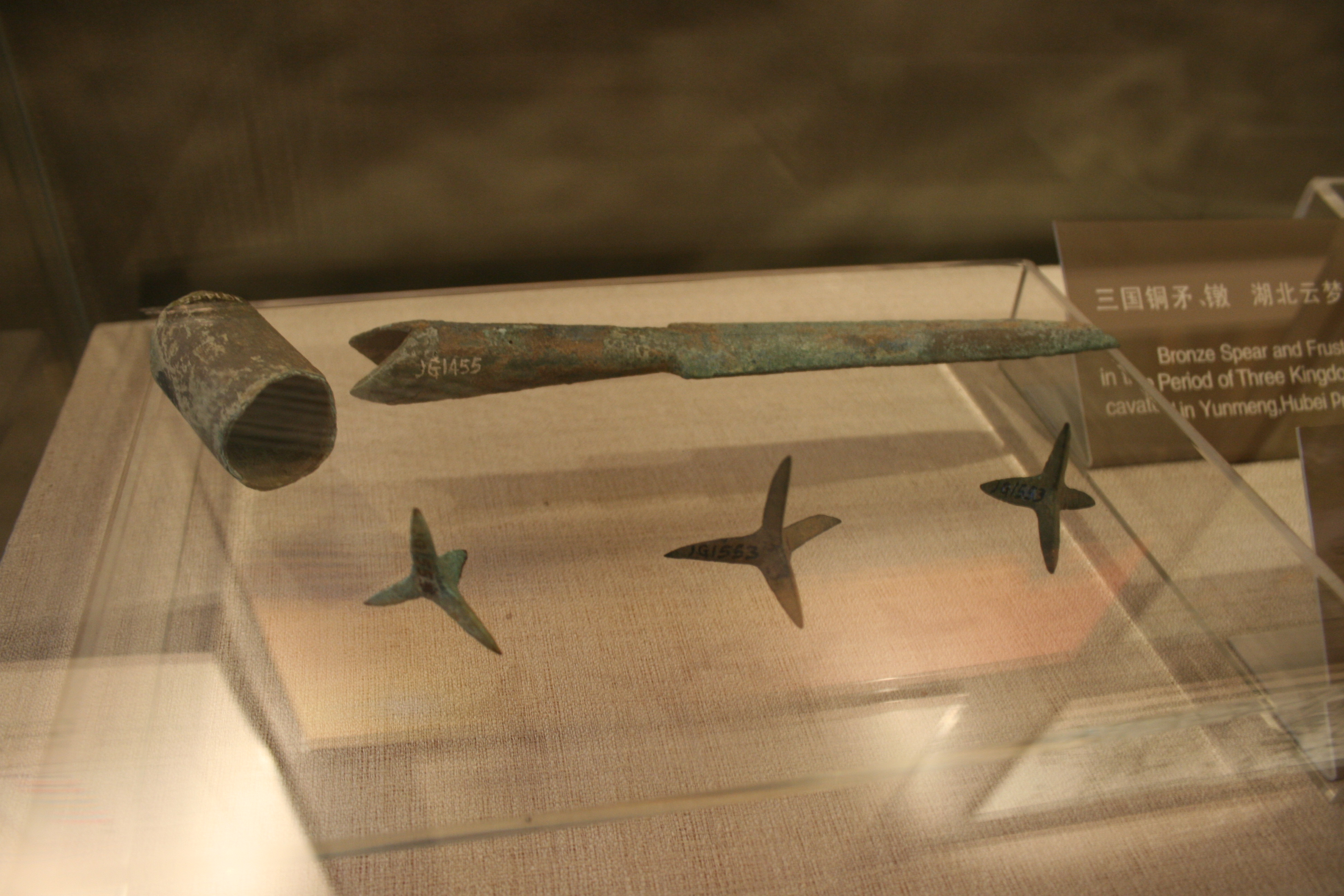
Three Kingdoms caltrops and spearhead

Armies of the Three Kingdoms era used largely the same equipment as the Han dynasty since it directly follows the end of the Han. There were however some minor differences and developments such as the increasing prevalence of armoured cavalry. In one battle, the warlord Cao Cao boasted that with only ten sets of horse armour he had faced an enemy with three hundred sets. The horse armour may however have just been partial frontal barding. Mounting stirrups were already in use, possibly as early as the Han dynasty, but full riding stirrups would not appear until the 4th century. References to "dark armour" (xuan kai or xuan jia 玄鎧/玄甲) and "brilliant armour" also began to appear in the 3rd century. This is probably in reference to the association of high quality steel with black ferrous material.

Weapons were largely the same as well, although there was more focus on idiosyncratic weapons wielded by particularly noteworthy individuals. For example, one man named Chen An apparently wielded a great sword over two meters in length and Sun Quan's wife had over a hundred female attendants armed with daos. Trends in warfare that had already been underway during the Eastern Han continued to gain momentum. By the end of the Three Kingdoms, the single edged dao, with its thicker and more durable dull side, had overtaken the straight double-edged jian as the primary close combat weapon. The more expensive, lighter, and less durable jian entered the domain of court dancers, officials, and expert warriors. While halberds were still used during the period, long spears and lances (similar to pikes) re-rose in prominence over halberds for infantry and cavalry forces. This was believed to have been the result of the long spear and lances' simpler construction, the adoption of long spears and lances by heavy cavalry to strike infantrymen, and the adoption of tighter infantry formations with less room for swinging and hooking [of halberds] in response to the greater threat by cavalry. Soldiers in the northeast specialized in long spears. After the Han dynasty, the crossbow gradually faded in importance until it made a mild resurgence during the Tang dynasty, under which the ideal expeditionary army of 20,000 included 2,200 archers and 2,000 crossbowmen.

References to "great shields" occur in their usage on the front line to protect spearmen and crossbowmen. Shields were also commonly paired with the single edged dao and used among cavalrymen. Descriptions of the Battle of Guandu mention that Cao Cao's soldiers employed shield cover above their heads each time they moved out into the open due to oppressive arrow fire from Yuan Shao's wooden towers.

Although Zhuge Liang is often credited with the invention of the repeating crossbow, this is actually due to a mistranslation confusing it with the multiple bolt crossbow. The source actually says Zhuge invented a multiple bolt crossbow that could shoot ten iron bolts simultaneously, each 20 cm long.

=== Dark armour ===
A report in 231 AD mentions the capture of 5,000 suits of "dark armour" (xuan kai or xuan jia 玄鎧/玄甲) and 3,100 crossbows. Dark armour appears in Han texts as well, but only as the attire worn by honor guards at funeral processions. The only known trait about dark armour is that it reflected the sun's rays. This probably means dark armour was made of high-quality steel, which was often associated with black ferrous material.

=== Brilliant armour ===
Cao Zhi mentioned three different kinds of armour, two of which were variants of "brilliant" armour:

The Previous Emperor presented your vassal with armor (kai), to wit, a suit of "black-brilliant" (heiguang) and one of "bright-brilliant" (mingguang) and a suit of "double-faced" (liangtang) armor, but now that the present age is peaceful and the weapons and armor (bingge) are not of use, I request leave to turn them all over to the Armor Board (kaicao) to be taken care of.

— Cao Zhi

Brilliant armour was made of decarburized steel, which shines blue-black when polished, giving it its name. Chen Lin described brilliant armour in the following manner:

As for the armor (kai) then like that of Quegong of the Eastern Barbarians,
It is made of the finest steel refined a hundred times;
The armorer has plied his hammer,
The leather-worker has made the stitching;
[Adorned with] dark feathers the flashing armor (jia)
Gleams and shines, throwing off light.

— Chen Lin

=== Wheel catapult ===
Ma Jun, a military engineer serving under Cao Wei, devised a siege weapon which threw large stones using a wheel. This device consisted of a drum wheel attached with a curved knife. When rotated, the stones which hung on the wheel would be cut loose by the knife and launched. It is not clear how well this device worked in practice. Successful tests with roof tiles instead of stones are mentioned, but according to Liang Jieming, this contraption never made it past the testing phase and could not have been possible with the technology available at the time.

=== Special weapons ===
The historical novel Romance of the Three Kingdoms attributes a number of fictional weapons, often with special names, to certain individuals. Examples include Liu Bei's "Paired Winding Swords" (雙股劍), Guan Yu's "Green Dragon Crescent Blade" (青龍偃月刀), Zhang Fei's "Eighteen chi Serpent Lance" (丈八蛇矛), Zhao Yun's "Blue Steel Sword" (青釭劍), Cao Cao's "Sword of Heaven" (倚天劍), Sun Jian's "Ancient Ingot Blade" (古錠刀), Cheng Pu's "Ironspine Serpent Lance" (鐵脊蛇矛), and Lü Bu's "Fangtian Huaji" (方天畫戟), otherwise known as the "Sky Piercer" or "Sky Piercing Halberd". While these are completely fictional, the Records of the Three Kingdoms do mention weapons unique to individuals on at least two occasions: Dian Wei's double halberd which weighed 20 kg and Gongsun Zan's two-bladed spear.

== Single combat ==
The Records of the Three Kingdoms and Annotations to Records of the Three Kingdoms contain two instances of single combat between generals. In 192, after Dong Zhuo had been murdered, Li Jue and Guo Si formed an army to oust Wang Yun and Lü Bu from Chang'an. When Guo Si approached the city from the north, Lü Bu opened the gate and offered to settle the matter by single combat. Guo Si agreed and engaged with Lü Bu, who pierced Guo Si with his lance. Guo Si's men came forth, saving their general, and both sides withdrew. Another instance of individual combat occurred between Taishi Ci, then serving under Liu Yao, and Sun Ce. Taishi Ci was on a mission accompanied by only a single horseman when he met Sun Ce, who had 13 other men with him. Taishi Ci charged at Sun Ce and the two sides clashed in single combat. Sun Ce pierced Taishi's horse and managed to grab hold of his halberd while Taishi removed Sun's helmet. When their respective reinforcements showed up, they disengaged and the duel came to an end.

Combat between generals and officers during battle is also mentioned by the Records. In 197 Yan Xing, an officer of Han Sui, engaged with Ma Chao and nearly killed him when his spear broke and pierced Ma Chao's neck. In 200 Yan Liang, a general of Yuan Shao, was slain by Guan Yu, then serving under Cao Cao, during the Battle of Boma. In 214 Zhang Liao charged Sun Quan's army with only 800 men and reportedly killed ten soldiers and two officers. He then broke through the enemy ramparts and challenged Sun Quan to a duel, to which he declined.

== Three Kingdoms ==
=== Cao Wei ===
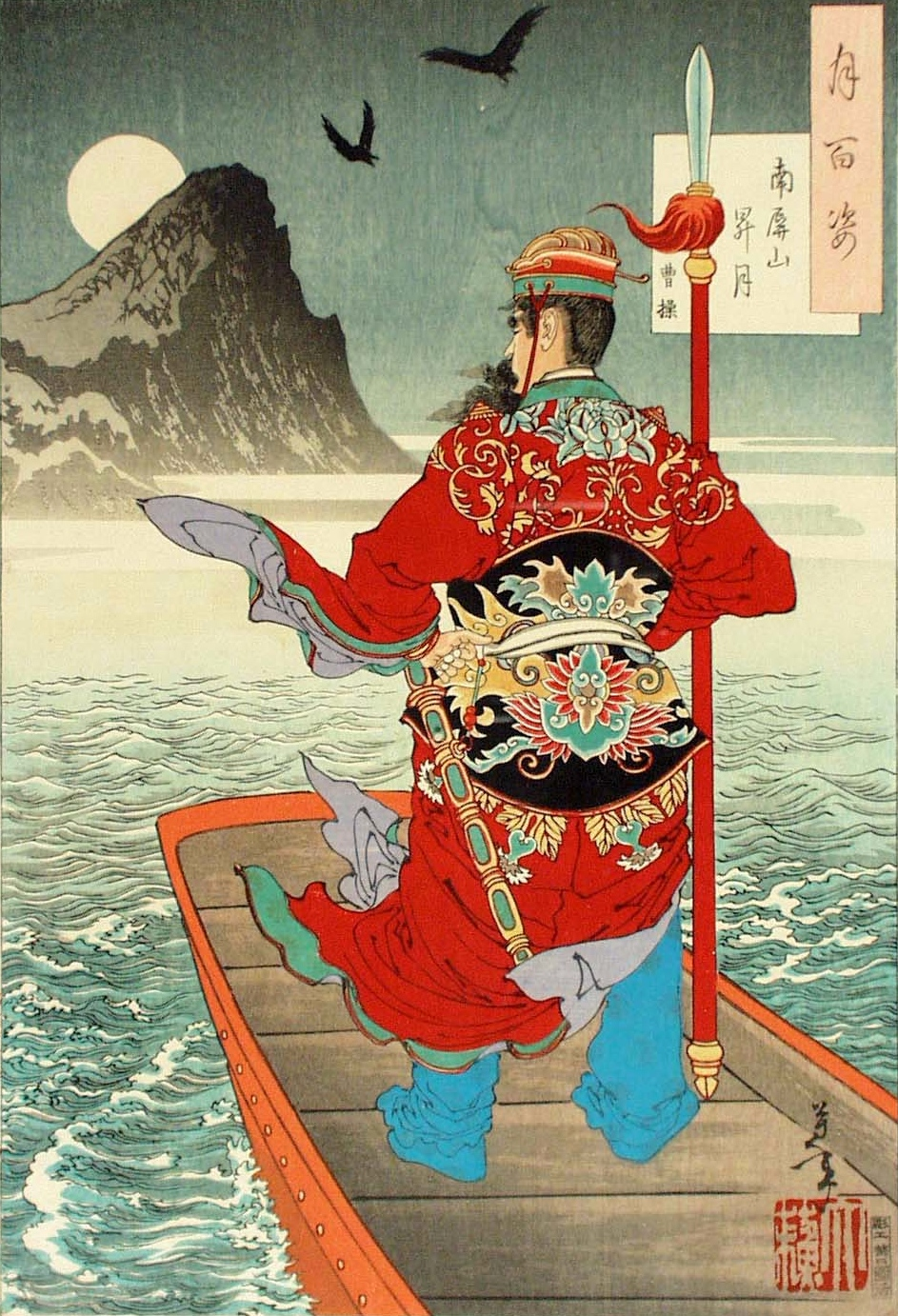
Cao Cao in Japanese art

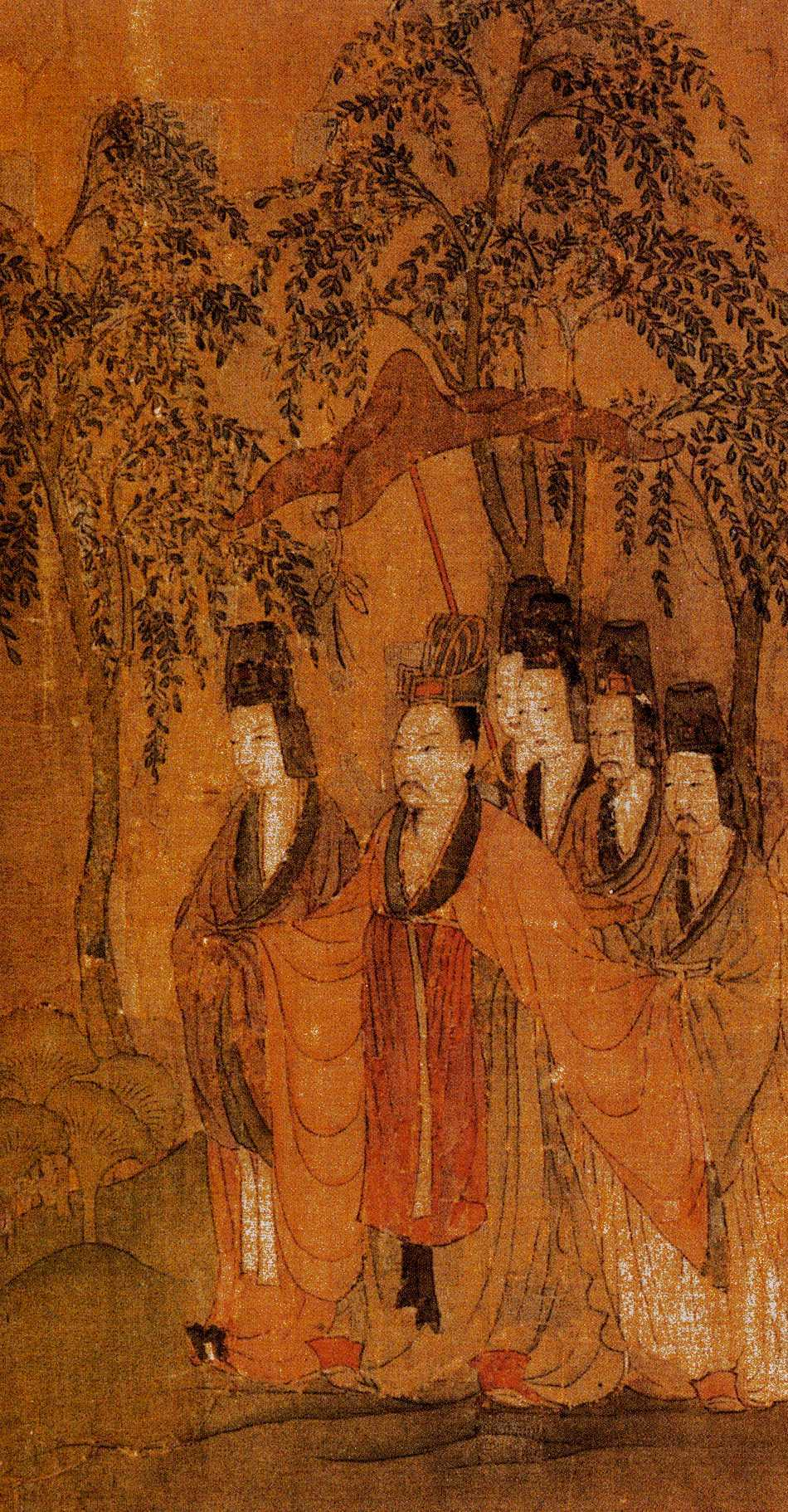
Cao Zhi

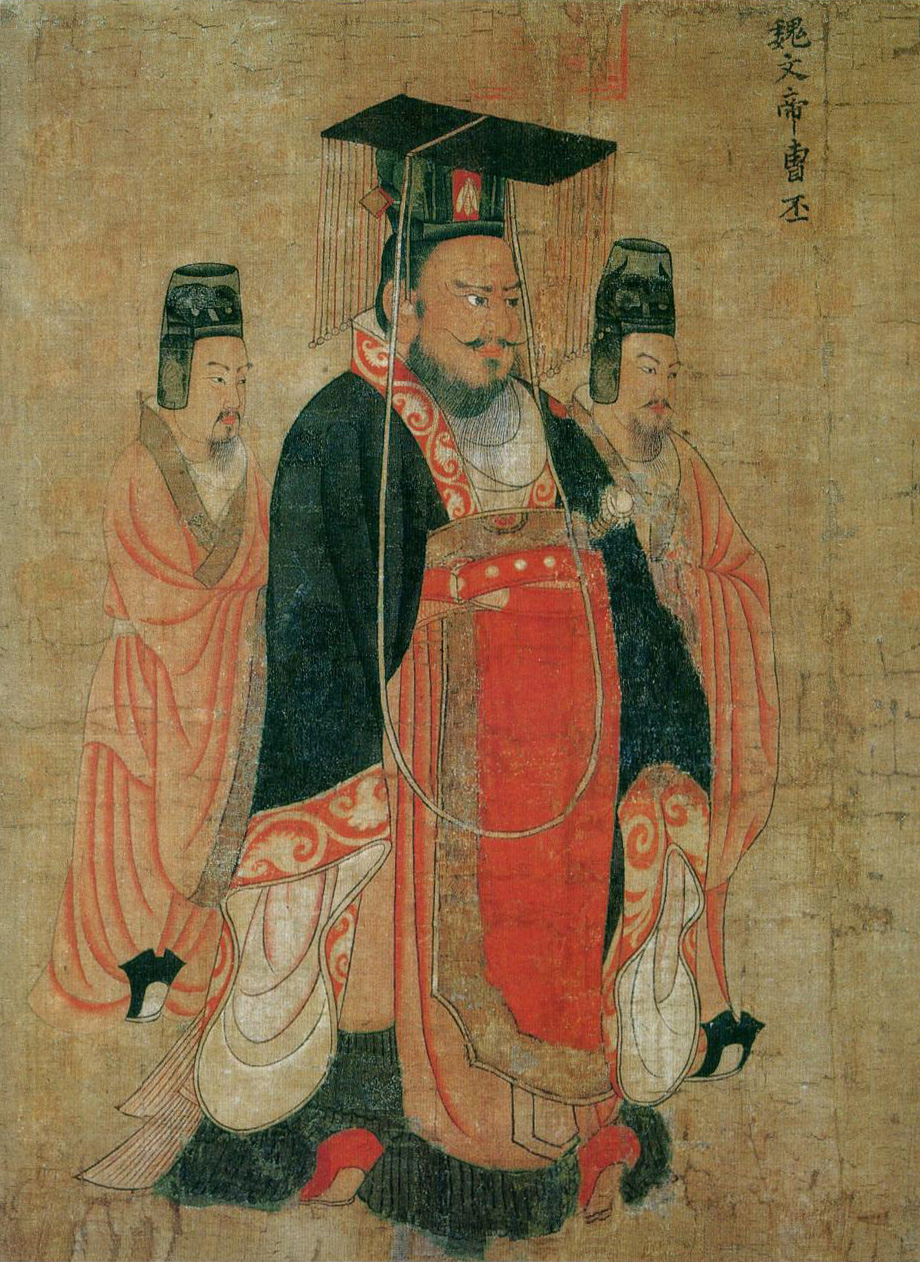
Cao Pi

Cao Wei was founded by Cao Pi in 220 and was usurped by Sima Yan's Jin dynasty in 266.

==== Cao Cao ====
Cao Cao was the son of Cao Song, whose original surname was Xiahou but took the name of Cao as a child when he was adopted by the eunuch Cao Teng. During his childhood Cao Cao studied the Art of War and was fond of hawking and hunting with dogs. He was also considered a troublemaker and local thug in his town. At one point in his youth, Cao Cao and Yuan Shao raided a wedding. Cao Cao kidnapped the bride and directed the pursuers toward Yuan Shao. Xu Shao foretold that Cao Cao would be "a good servant in time of peace, a dangerous chieftain in time of trouble".

In the 170s Cao Cao became a chief of police in Luoyang and made a name for himself as a strict enforcer of the law. He was eventually implicated and dismissed from his post in 178.

Cao Cao took part in suppressing the Yellow Turban rebellion in 184 as a Commandant of Cavalry. He was then appointed Chancellor of Jinan Commandery, where he set about removing officials under the influence of the imperial family. Cao Cao became afraid of the enemies he had made at court so he left his post.

In 188, Cao Cao became a colonel of the Army of the Western Garden. When Dong Zhuo seized power in 189, Cao Cao fled to Chenliu Commandery, where he sold his family estates and raised troops to join Yuan Shao and the Campaign against Dong Zhuo. Irritated by Yuan Shao's lack of action, Cao Cao advanced into He'nan Commandery only to suffer defeat at the Battle of Xingyang.

Cao Cao raised more troops in Yang Province. In 191 he became Administrator of Dong Commandery for defeating the bandit chieftain Bo Rao. When Liu Dai, the Inspector of Yan Province, died in 192 while dealing with the Yellow Turbans from Qing Province, Cao Cao succeeded him. By the end of the year Cao Cao had negotiated the surrender of the rebels, who augmented his army with 30,000 additional soldiers, known collectively as the Qingzhou Troops (青州兵).

In 193 Cao Cao drove away Yuan Shu to the south. At this time however, his father Cao Song and brother Cao De were killed by some of the rogue troops of Tao Qian, the Governor of Xu Province. Cao Cao invaded Xu Province in retaliation massacring hundreds of thousands of civilians on his first campaign, but in 194 while on his second campaign against Tao Qian his former friend Zhang Miao raised the flag of rebellion in Yan Province. With the aid of Lü Bu, the rebels dealt several defeats to Cao Cao, taking most of the province. Eventually the tide turned on them and Cao Cao regained his territories. Zhang Miao's family was destroyed while Lü Bu fled to Xu Province.

In 196 Cao Cao took control of the imperial court and moved it to Xu city. In 197 Cao Cao came into conflict with Zhang Xiu and Liu Biao. However he retreated due to news of a potential raid by Yuan Shao. In 198 Liu Bei took refuge with Cao Cao and requested his aid against Lü Bu. Cao Cao laid siege to Lü Bu in Xiapi Commandery and killed him that winter, taking control of Xu Province. Liu Bei rebelled and was driven away. Yuan Shao crossed the Yellow River with a large army in the spring of 200 but was too slow to mobilize. In the winter Cao Cao led a raiding party behind enemy lines and destroyed their supply train at the Battle of Guandu, causing Yuan Shao's army to disintegrate. Meanwhile, Liu Bei had been making trouble in Ru'nan Commandery with the bandit Gong Du. With Yuan Shao no longer posing a threat, Cao Cao returned to deal with Liu Bei, driving him away to take refuge with Liu Biao.

In the summer of 202, Yuan Shao died, leaving his territory to his sons. They fought among themselves and fell prey to Cao Cao's advances. By 205 he had ousted Yuan Tan and Yuan Shang from their southern territories. Over the next two years he brought Ji Province and southern Bing Province under his control. In the summer of 207 Cao Cao made a roundabout trip north and defeated the Wuhuan at the Battle of White Wolf Mountain. They fled to Gongsun Kang in Liaodong Commandery, but he beheaded them and delivered their heads to Cao Cao.

As Cao Cao prepared to campaign south in 208, Liu Biao died. His son Liu Zong surrendered while Liu Bei fled further south. Cao Cao followed and defeated Liu Bei at the Battle of Changban. Seizing the naval base at Jiangling, Cao Cao moved his new river fleet downstream. His confrontation with Liu Bei and the Sun Quan's general Zhou Yu culminated in defeat and the destruction of his fleet at the Battle of Red Cliffs. Failing to cross the Changjiang, Cao Cao retreated north.

In 211 Cao Cao moved west against Zhang Lu and in doing so also drew the ire of Ma Chao and Han Sui. They were outmaneuvered and defeated at the Battle of Tong Pass. In 212 Cao Cao left Xiahou Yuan behind to continue the northwestern campaign while he returned east to attack Sun Quan across the Huai River. The invasion force reached the banks of the Changjiang but failed to break the enemy defenses. Cao Cao returned to Ye City in 213.

In 215 Cao Cao eliminated Zhang Lu and occupied Hanzhong Commandery. Cao Cao attacked Sun Quan again in 217 after Sun Quan's failed attack in 215. However he was never able to make it past the Changjiang defenses but was able to gain Sun Quan's nominal surrender. In the spring of 219, his general Xiahou Yuan was killed at the Battle of Mount Dingjun and Cao Cao lost his position in Hanzhong Commandery. Liu Bei's general Guan Yu also defeated Yu Jin's fores in Nanyang Commandery and laid siege to Cao Ren in Fancheng. However he was unable to take the city and was himself killed when Sun Quan's general Lü Meng who took advantage of the situation and attacked him from behind. Cao Cao died soon afterward on 15 March, 220. He was succeeded by his son Cao Pi.

Although primarily known as a military leader, Cao Cao also compiled a commentary on the Art of War and was a renowned poet and player of the game of weiqi. His two most famous poems, Though the Tortoise Lives Long and Short Song Style were written during and right before the battles of White Wolf Mountain and Red Cliff.

《龜雖壽》

Though the Tortoise Lives Long

神龜雖壽，猶有竟時。

Though the tortoise blessed with magic powers lives long,
Its days have their allotted span;

騰蛇乘霧，終為土灰。

Though winged serpents ride high on the mist,
They turn to dust and ashes at the last;

老驥伏櫪，志在千里；

An old war-horse may be stabled,
Yet still it longs to gallop a thousand li;

烈士暮年，壯心不已。

And a noble-hearted man though advanced in years
Never abandons his proud aspirations.

盈縮之期，不但在天；

Man's span of life, whether long or short,
Depends not on Heaven alone;

養怡之福，可得永年。

One who eats well and keeps cheerful
Can live to a great old age.

幸甚至哉！歌以咏志。

And so, with joy in my heart,
I hum this song.

==== Later history ====
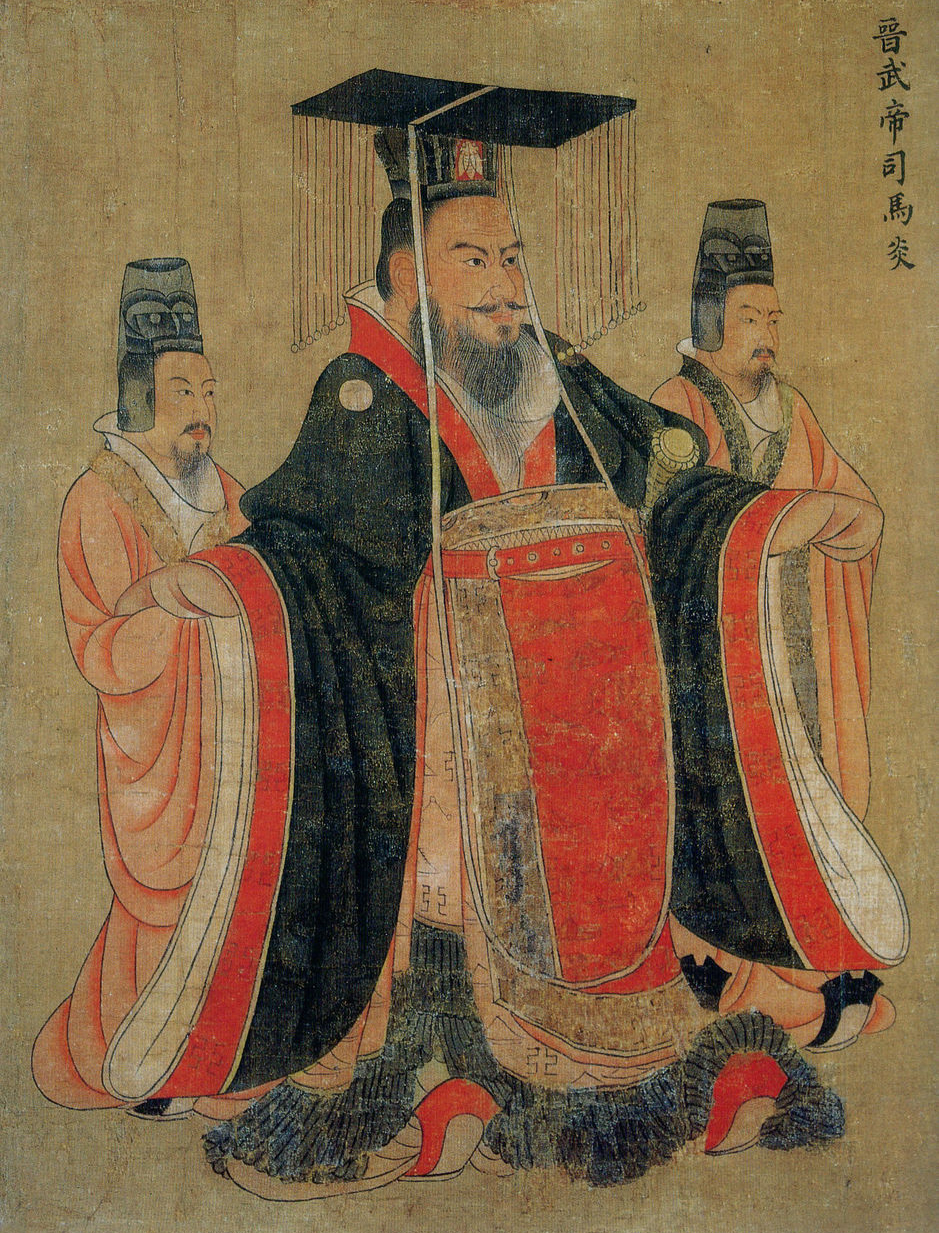
Emperor Wu of Jin (Sima Yan)

There are broadly speaking five possible operations for any army. If you can fight, fight. If you cannot fight, defend. If you cannot defend, flee. The two remaining operations include only surrender and death. If you are not willing to face bondage, then all that is left for you is to die and spare your family of the ransom.

— Sima Yi

On 11 December, 220, Cao Pi deposed the last Han emperor and proclaimed himself Emperor of Cao Wei. During his reign Cao Pi alienated his brothers Cao Zhang and Cao Zhi. Cao Pi deeply distrusted his close kin and reduced their powers out of suspicion of their loyalty. Cao Pi died in 226 and was succeeded by his son Cao Rui. Although Cao Rui was twenty years old, he was nonetheless appointed a regency council by his father prior to his death. By 236, three members of the regency council had died, leaving Sima Yi as the primary leader of Cao Wei. Before this time, Shu Han launch attacks on the Wei borders and in 229, Zhuge Liang occupied Wudu Commandery. He was, however, unable to make any further gains during his battles against Sima Yi and died in 234. In 238 Sima Yi annexed the Gongsun state in the northwest. This was followed by a campaign into Goguryeo in 244 and 245. Cao Rui died in 239 and was succeeded by his adopted son Cao Fang, who fell under the regency of Cao Shuang and Sima Yi.

In 249 Sima Yi killed Cao Shuang and seized power in Wei. He died two years later and was succeeded by his son Sima Shi. Cao Fang tried to retake power for himself in 254 but failed and was replaced by his cousin, Cao Mao. Sima Shi died in 255 and was succeeded by his brother Sima Zhao. In 260 Cao Mao, like his cousin, attempted to seize control of the state, but failed and died in the process. In 264 Sima Zhao conquered Shu Han, eliminating one of the Three Kingdoms. He died the following year and was succeeded by his son Sima Yan. On 8 February 266, Sima Yan deposed the last emperor of Wei, Cao Huan, and proclaimed himself Emperor of the Jin dynasty.

Sima Yan went on to annex the southern state of Eastern Wu in 280, putting an end to the period of the Three Kingdoms.

=== Shu Han ===
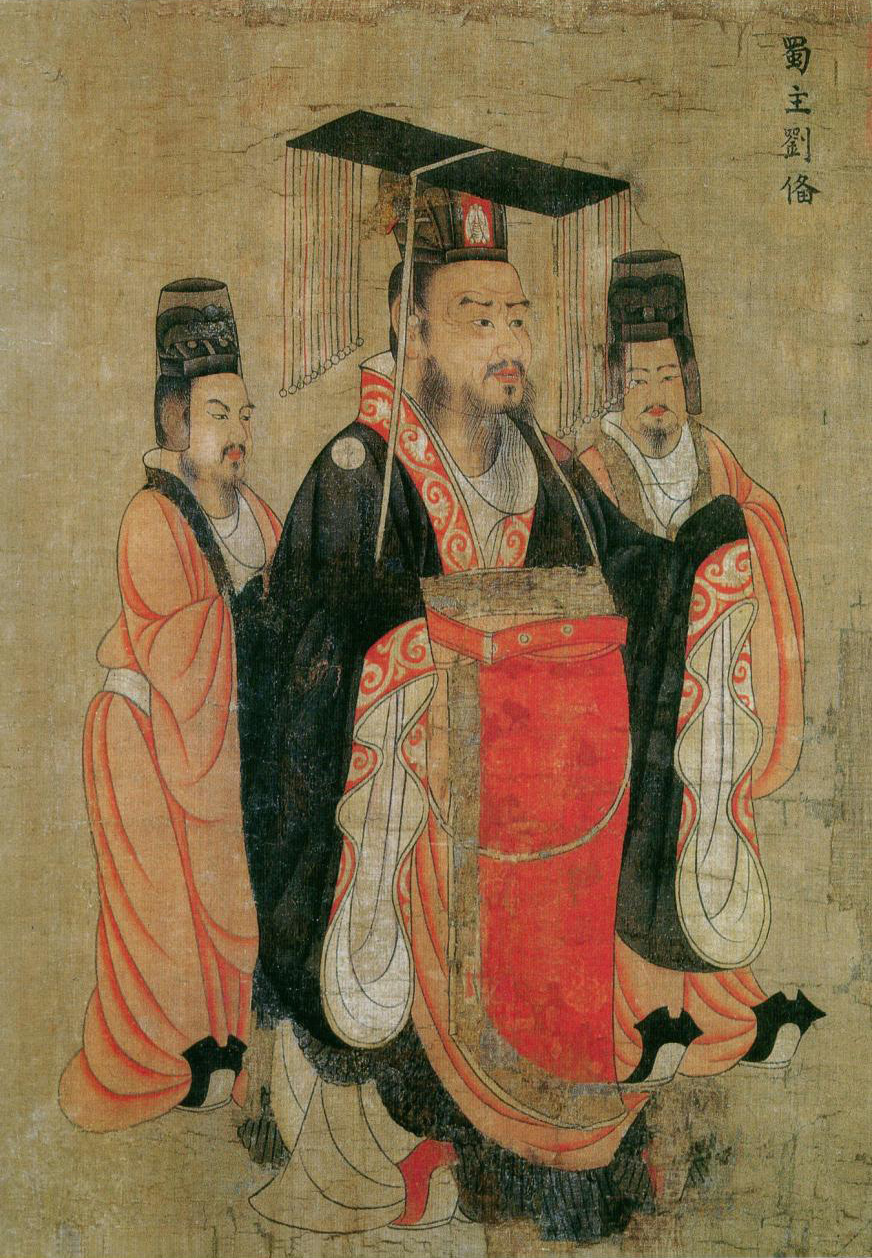
Liu Bei

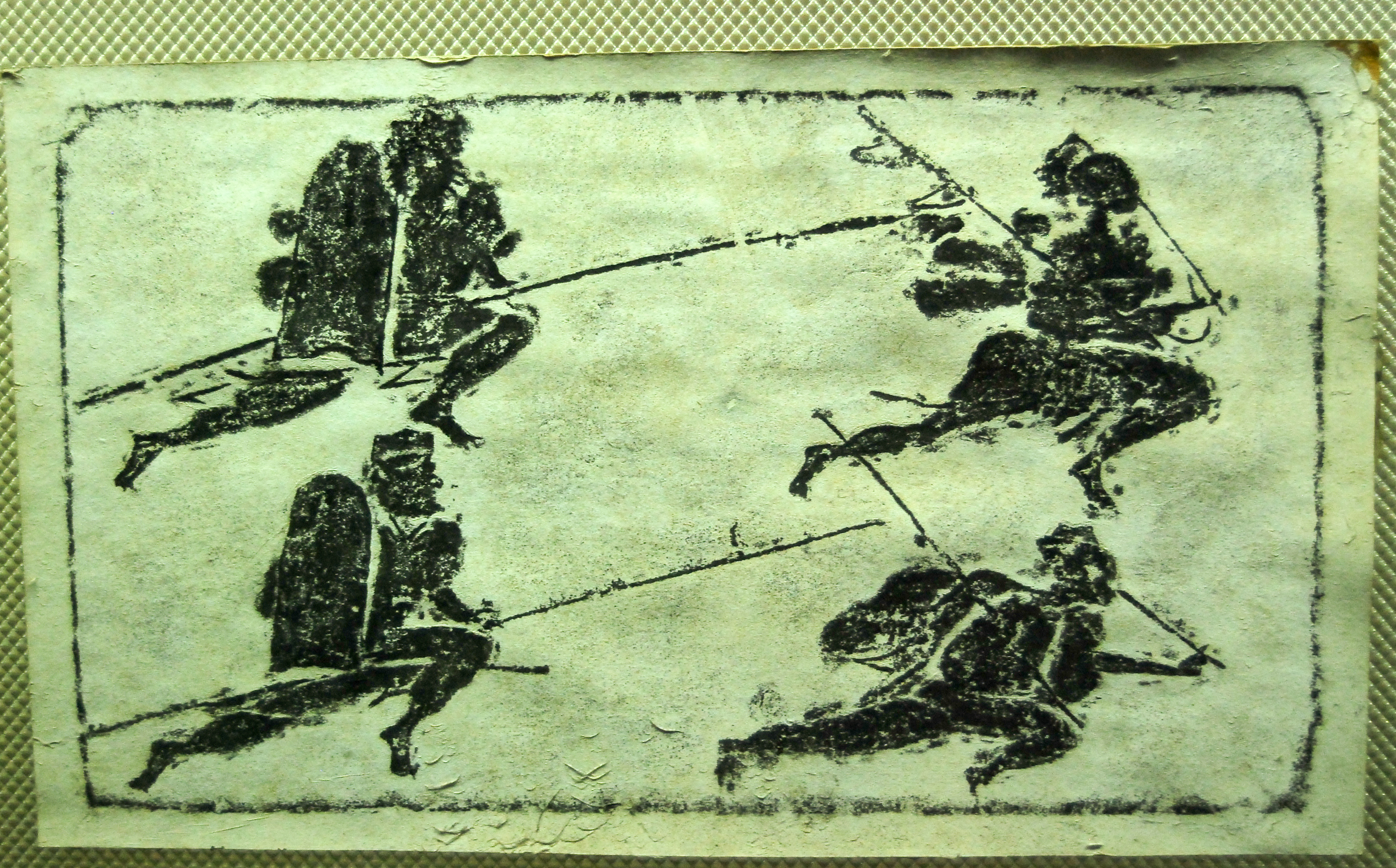
Late Eastern Han-Three Kingdoms era brick relief of shieldbearers with spears from modern Sichuan, the area occupied by Shu han

Shu Han was founded by Liu Bei in 221 and was conquered by Cao Wei in 263.

==== Liu Bei ====
Liu Bei was a very distant descendant of Emperor Jing of Han. His father Liu Hong died when he was still very young and his mother made a living by selling straw sandals. In 175 Liu Bei was sent to study at the Taixue of Luoyang, where he became friends with Gongsun Zan. Liu Bei had very little interest in books but had a knack for fighting and inspired many young men to join him. With the support of two merchants, Zhang Shiping and Su Shuang, Liu Bei was able to create a sizable following including his long time friends Guan Yu and Zhang Fei. When the Yellow Turban Rebellion broke out in 184 Liu Bei led his troops against them under various commanders. He did well in both campaigns but was only rewarded with a very low position in the imperial service. He abandoned his post when an officer tried to reduce his position and joined Guanqiu Yi on an expedition against rebels in Danyang Commandery. For his service in that expedition he was rewarded with the post of assistant magistrate in a county in Pingyuan Commandery. When the anti-Dong Zhuo coalition formed, Liu Bei raised troops in their service, but soon afterwards left to join his friend Gongsun Zan in the north.

Liu Bei assisted Gongsun Zan against his rival Yuan Shao in 191 and was given the post of magistrate in Pingyuan Commandery. His post didn't last long as Yuan Shao dealt a devastating blow to Gongsun Zan in 192 and Liu Bei was forced to move east to Qi Commandery. When Tao Qian of Xu Province offered him 4,000 troops and a post in Pei Commandery, Liu Bei accepted. Tao Qian died in 194 and Liu Bei succeeded him as Governor of Xu Province. In 196 Yuan Shu invaded from the south and fought Liu Bei for a month at a stalemate. During this time however, Liu Bei had lost Xiapi Commandery due to Zhang Fei killing its Chancellor allowing Lü Bu, who was at the time taking refuge in the province, to attack Liu Bei and forced him to surrender. Having defeated Liu Bei and taken control of Xu Province, Lü Bu drove away Yuan Shu's army. Though he was defeated, Liu Bei still retained Pei Commandery. When Yuan Shu attacked Liu Bei again, Lü Bu prevented his advance out of fear that Yuan Shu would become too powerful. Liu Bei continued to recruit troops until 198 when he intercepted a trade convoy from Lü Bu. Lü Bu's officers Gao Shun and Zhang Liao retaliated, taking Pei Commandery and forcing Liu Bei to flee to Cao Cao. Cao Cao sent an army under Xiahou Dun to assist Liu Bei against Lü Bu. In the autumn their army was defeated by Gao Shun. When Cao Cao joined them in the winter, they successfully laid siege to Lü Bu in Xiapi Commandery and killed him the following year.

In 199 Liu Bei was sent to intercept Yuan Shu from making contact with Yuan Shao. When Liu Bei reached Xu Province, he rebelled, killing the Inspector Che Zhou. Cao Cao's initial attempt to suppress him ended in failure but the second one in 200 succeeded. Liu Bei abandoned his family and Guan Yu, who were captured, and fled to Yuan Shao in Qing Province. He was sent to Ru'nan Commandery to assist the bandit Gong Du but suffered defeat at the hands of Cao Cao's officer Cao Ren.He was however able to defeat and kill Cao Cao's officer Cai Yang. Yuan Shao's army was defeated in 200 at the Battle of Guandu and Liu Bei was forced to take refuge with Liu Biao in Jing Province.

Stationed on the northern frontier of Jing Province, in 202 Liu Bei achieved victory against Xiahou Dun and Yu Jin at the Battle of Bowang. After that Cao Cao became preoccupied with the north while Liu Bei was recalled to court. During his stay with Liu Biao, Liu Bei recruited Zhuge Liang, who would later become the leading military figure of Shu Han. In the autumn of 208 Liu Biao died and Cao Cao moved to invade. Liu Biao's son Liu Zong chose to surrender. Liu Bei led his followers south to the Changjiang where they were heavily defeated by Cao Cao at the Battle of Changban in Nan Commandery. While Cao Cao occupied the naval base at Jiangling, Liu Bei retreated to the southeast towards Xiakou, and Zhou Yu, general of Sun Quan to the east, came upriver with a sizable army. Having augmented his main army with Jing Province's fleet, Cao Cao continued his advance in the winter against Zhou Yu and Liu Bei's forces arrayed on the east bank of the Changjiang. Despite his superior numbers, Cao Cao was defeated at the Battle of Red Cliffs and his fleet was destroyed by a deployment of fire ships by Sun Quan's officer, Huang Gai. In the winter of 208-209 Liu Bei has conquered most of southern Jing while Zhou Yu had captured Jiangling thus ending any hope Cao Cao had of obtaining area across the Changjiang.

After Liu Qi died in 208, Liu Bei became the Governor of Jing Province. Zhou Yu died in 210 and his successor Lu Su convinced Sun Quan to "lend"(give) Liu Bei Nan Commandery. In 211 Liu Zhang invited Liu Bei to Yi Province as an ally. In 212 Liu Bei betrayed Liu Zhang and attacked him, waging a two-year war that ended in Liu Zhang's surrender and Liu Bei's conquest of Yi Province. In 215 Sun Quan demanded that Liu Bei give him all of southern Jing Province that Liu Bei had obtained. When Liu Bei denied his demands, Sun Quan sent an invasion force commanded by Lü Meng and Lu Su and Liu Bei sent Guan Yu to confront the two in response while he gathers troops for an inevitable battle. A settlement was eventual reached, dividing southern Jing along the Xiang River. In 217 Liu Bei invaded Hanzhong Commandery, which was then under the control of Cao Cao, and solidified his gains in 219 by achieving a decisive victory over the Cao army and killing Xiahou Yuan.

In the autumn of 219, Liu Bei proclaimed himself King of Hanzhong at a coronation ceremony in Mianyang, and established a court in Chengdu. Liu Bei's general, Guan Yu, besieged Fan city, in modern Xiangfan, but Cao Cao's cousin Cao Ren held out and Cao Cao's officer Xu Huang came to his rescue and drove Guan Yu away from Fan Castle. In the winter while Guan Yu was fighting against Cao Ren an offensive by Lü Meng into Nan Commandery ruined Guan Yu's position and he was killed by Lü Meng upon his capture. Sun Quan thus had seized southern Jing Province.

On 15 May 221, Liu Bei proclaimed himself emperor. He then attacked Sun Quan through the Three Gorges and into the middle Changjiang. The following year Lu Xun destroyed Liu Bei's line of camps and forced him to retreat to Baidi Castle with heavy losses. Liu Bei fell ill soon after the battle and upon Sun Quan being under attack by the forces of Cao Pi the two reformed their alliance. Liu Bei died in the summer of 223 and was succeeded by his son Liu Shan, though the government was effectively under the control of Zhuge Liang as a part of Liu Bei's dying request.

==== Liu Shan ====
Liu Shan was only 17 years old when his father died and lacked the ability to lead so Zhuge Liang became de facto head of state. In 224 and 225 Zhuge Liang embarked on a Southern Campaign which brought at least nominal submission from chieftains in the south of Yi Province. In the north Zhuge Liang made several attempts to break through the Qinling range, managing to occupy Wudu Commandery in 229. However he was unable to press farther north in his conflicts with Sima Yi and died in 234. Unlike the Sun and Cao regimes, Shu Han never managed to create anything more than an ad hoc warlord regime, probably because its leaders were not native to the region. In 264 Shu Han was conquered by Sima Zhao, the de facto ruler of Cao Wei, whose son Sima Yan would go on to depose the Cao sovereign on 8 February 266, and proclaim himself emperor of the Jin dynasty.

=== Eastern Wu ===
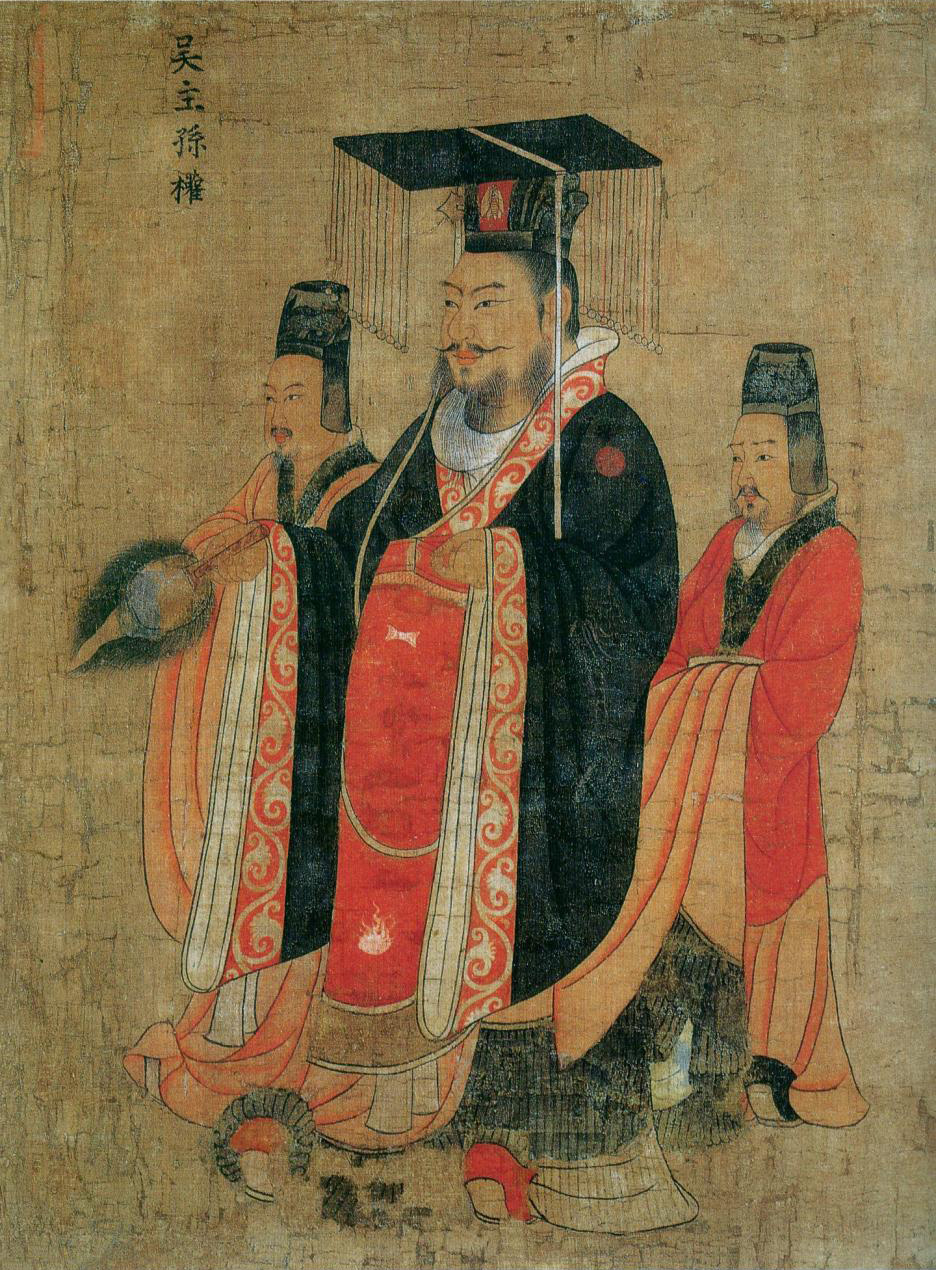
Sun Quan

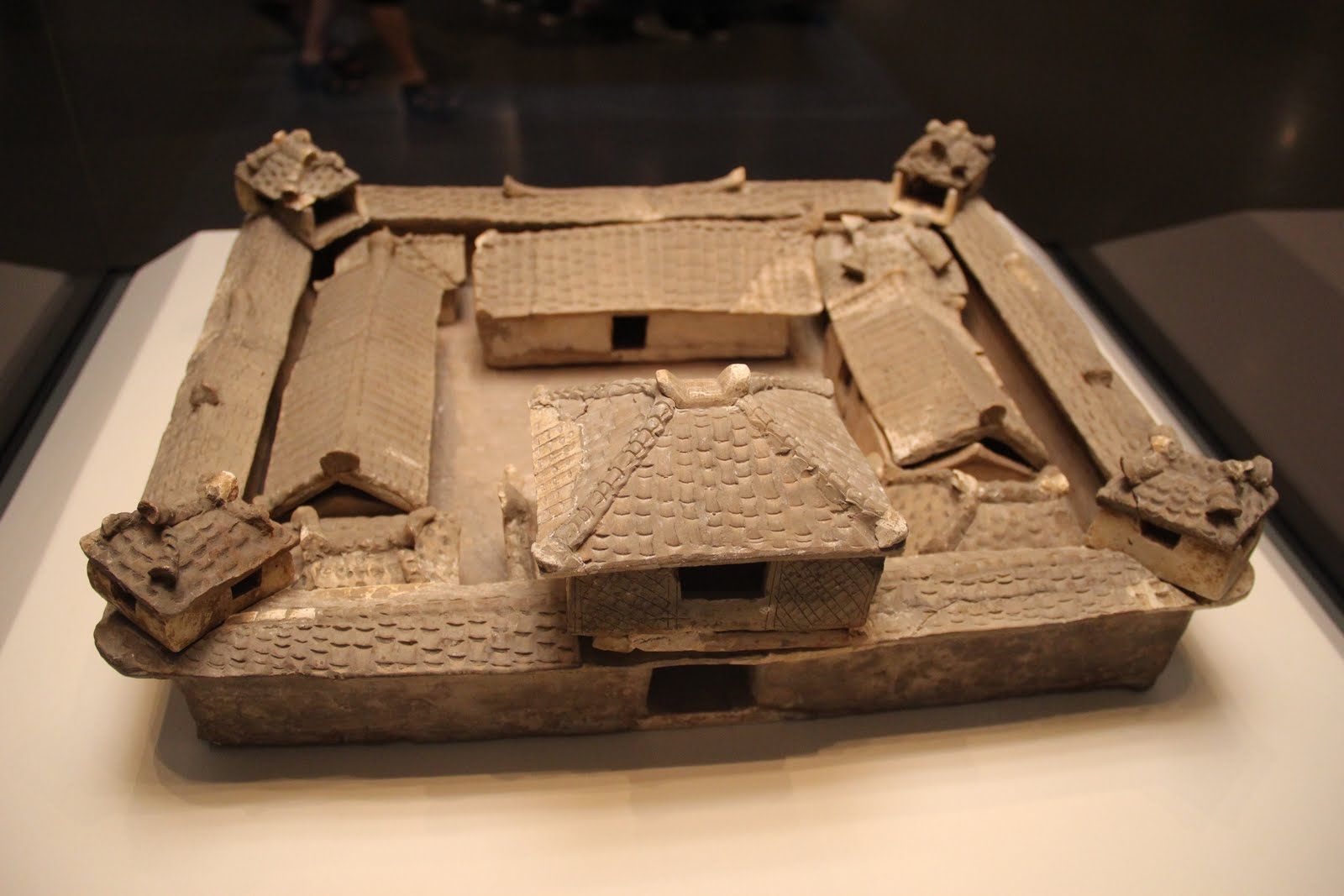
Miniature pottery walled manor with courtyard from a Wu period tomb

Eastern Wu, also known as Sun Wu, was founded by Sun Quan in 229 and was conquered by the Jin dynasty in 280.

==== Sun Jian ====
The twins Sun Jian and Sun Qiang were born in 155 AD to an undistinguished merchant family based in the county of Fuchun, Wu Commandery, Yang province. Although his family was of no great importance, they were purportedly descendants of the military strategist Sun Zi, who is traditionally credited with the authorship of The Art of War. Whether the claimed ancestry is true or not, Sun Jian's family played little role in the affairs of the Han dynasty, and next to nothing is known about Sun Jian's obscure lineage.

As a youth, Sun Jian was described as unusual in appearance, kind, intelligent, but fond of odd behavior. At the young age of 16 he was appointed a junior civil officer in the county administration. Sun Jian first made a name for himself at the age of 17 when he went on a trip with his father to Qiantang. During the trip they heard of a band of pirates led by Hu Yu robbing nearby travelers. Sun Jian wanted to attack them while his father wanted nothing to do with the pirates. Even so, Sun Jian set out to confront the pirates. He climbed onto a hill overlooking their camp and waved his sword as if directing soldiers to attack. The pirates thought Sun Jian was part of a government force so they fled. Sun Jian chased after them and took one head as proof of his success. Thereafter, he was promoted to Commandant.

In 172, Sun Jian was appointed Major of troops in Wu Commandery to put down Xu Chang's rebellion in Kuaiji Commandery. Sun Jian's success against the rebels drew the attention of Zang Min, who was in overall command of local forces. With Zang Min's recommendation, Sun Jian became Assistant in the county of Yandu, Guangling Commandery. For the next ten years he remained an official in Xu Province, where he gained a sizable following, and was well liked by those around him:

Wherever Sun Jian went he gained a good reputation, and the officers and people loved him and trusted him. There were always hundreds of his old friends from his home district and young adventurers who came visiting him. Sun Jian looked after them and cared for them like his own family.

— Sanguo Zhi

When the Yellow Turban Rebellion broke out in 184, Sun Jian was called up by Zhu Jun in Kuaiji Commandery, and appointed Associate Major. None could stand against him. Sun Jian constantly led at the forefront of his troops, being the first to scale the walls of Wancheng, dealing the last great blow to the Yellow Turbans. After the Yellow Turbans' defeat, Sun Jian was transferred over to the west to deal with the Liang Province rebellion. During his time there, he came to butt heads with Dong Zhuo, who felt that Sun Jian was a good commander but lacked quality troops.

In 186, Sun Jian returned to the capital and in 187 was promoted to Grand Administrator of Changsha Commandery. As Grand Administrator, Sun Jian destroyed the local rebels Ou Xing, Zhou Chao, and Guo Shi, even aiding neighboring commanderies, much to the consternation of his clerical officers:

I have none of the civil graces. Warfare is my work. If I cross the borders to attack some rebels, that is simply giving help to a neighbour. Even if I am committing a crime, why should I feel ashamed?

— Sun Jian, Sanguo Zhi

For his service in defeating the rebels, Sun Jian was enfeoffed as Marquis of Wucheng, the highest noble rank attainable for a man outside of the imperial family.

When Dong Zhuo seized power at Luoyang in 189, Sun Jian joined Yuan Shu and the anti-Dong Zhuo coalition. When Sun Jian passed by Jing Province, he killed its Inspector Wang Rui as well as the Administrator of Nanyang Commandery, Zhang Zhi, and took over their troops. Sun Jian took the lead in the allied offensive but was defeated by Xu Rong in 191. After recovering from his losses, Sun Jian defeated Hu Zhen and captured the capital of Luoyang. Defending the devastated city however was unfeasible, so he retreated with the Imperial Seal in tow, and passed it down to Yuan Shu. While Sun Jian was attacking Luoyang, the alliance had already broken up, and Yuan Shao's general Zhou Yu (Renming) attacked his base camp. Sun Jian returned and drove back Zhou Yu's army. Yuan Shu then sent him against Liu Biao in Jing Province, where Sun Jian died at the age of 37 in a skirmish near Xiangyang.

Together we raised loyal troops, intending to bring aid to the nation. The rebels and bandits are on the point of destruction, and yet people can act like this. Whom can I work with?

— Sun Jian, Sanguo Zhi

==== Sun Ce ====
Sun Ce was still young, and though he had his rank and was now well known, all the soldiers and people called him "Young Gentleman Sun." When men heard that Young Gentleman Sun was coming, they quite lost spirit, and the local magistrates and other officials would abandon the cities and run away to hide in the hills and open country. Then he would arrive, and the men of his command respected order, and they did not dare to rob or plunder: not even chickens or dogs or vegetables were stolen. And so the people were extremely pleased, and they would all come to bring cattle and wine as a welcome to the army.

— Sanguo Zhi

Sun Ce, son of Sun Jian, was 16 years old when his father died. His cousin, Sun Ben, whose father Sun Qiang had died in 175, took over his personal following and served under Yuan Shu. When Yuan Shu was driven to Jiujiang Commandery in 193, Sun Ce was given commission and sent south with some of his father's former troops. Sun Ce was defeated by Zu Lang and returned north the following year. He was granted another thousand troops and sent to take Lujiang Commandery from Lu Kang. Although successful in his endeavor, he was not promoted as was promised by Yuan Shu. In 195 he was sent against Liu Yao in Yang Province. Sun Ce quickly took over the region and pushed Liu Yao to Yuzhang Commandery. By 197 when Yuan Shao declared himself emperor, Sun Ce had become the dominant power in Yang Province, so he rejected his former allegiance and allied himself to Cao Cao. In 198 Sun Ce invaded Lujiang Commandery and defeated Liu Xun and Huang Zu. In 200 the Administrator of Yuzhang Commandery surrendered. At this point Yan Baihu and Xu Gong rebelled, so Sun Ce returned east, killing Xu Gong. Before he could deal with Yan Baihu however, Sun Ce was ambushed and killed by Xu Gong's retainers. He was 26 at the time of death.

Sun Ce's wound was very bad, and he called in Zhang Zhao and others and said, "Now China Proper is in confusion. With the resources of Wu and Yue, and the security of the Yangzi, we have enough to [keep aloof and] look on while others are fighting. Do you all try your best to aid my younger brother." Then he called Sun Quan, fastened the seal and ribbon to his belt, and said to him, "To raise the forces east of the Yangzi, to decide the opportunities between two battle lines, and to fight for supremacy in the empire: for that, you are not my equal. To raise the worthy and grant office to able men, so that each gives all his effort to hold the lands of the east: in that I am not equal to you."

— Sanguo Zhi

==== Sun Quan ====
Battle of Red Cliffs, and Cao Cao's retreat (also shown: Battle of Changban). Note that the battlefield location is marked at the site near Chibi City; see Location of Red Cliffs.

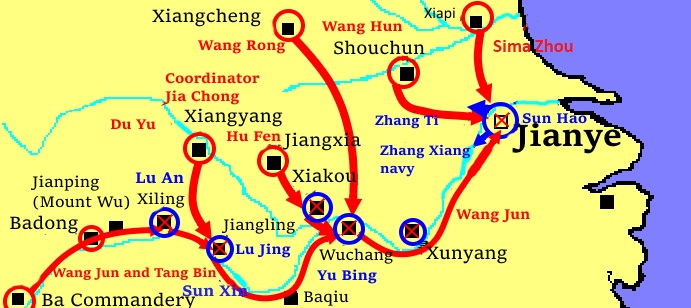
Conquest of Wu by Jin

Sun Quan was brave, and on occasion even foolhardy. We are told that he took delight in hunting tigers, and on at least one occasion an animal got close enough to tear the saddle of his horse. Later, he was persuaded to have a special carriage made, with some protection and loopholes to shoot from inside, but it was still a dangerous sport and it is said that Sun Quan took delight in being attacked by several wild beasts at a time.

— Rafe de Crespigny

Sun Quan succeeded his elder brother and spent the next two years studying. In 203 Sun Quan attacked and destroyed Huang Zu's fleet. In 204 he dealt with a rebellion in Danyang Commandery which killed his brother Sun Yi. In 205 his officer He Qi began expanding into modern Fujian and by 208 a full commandery had been created in the area. The attack on Huang Zu renewed in 207 and Sun Quan's forces successfully defeated and killed him in 208 at the Battle of Jiangxia.

Liu Biao died that year and his son Liu Zong surrendered to Cao Cao. As Liu Bei and Liu Qi fled south, Cao Cao requested Sun Quan's support, but Sun Quan decided to resist the northern encroachment instead and sent his generals Zhou Yu and Cheng Pu to support Liu Bei's cohort. Despite Cao Cao's overwhelming numerical superiority, his forces failed to cross the Changjiang and were defeated at the Battle of Red Cliff by an attack of fire ships from Sun Quan's officer Huang Gai. Cao Ren managed to hold onto Jiangling for another year before retreating north.

Liu Qi died soon afterwards and Jing Province was split between Liu Bei and Sun Quan. While Sun Quan's forces were preparing to launch an invasion of Yi Province ruled by Liu Zhang, his general Zhou Yu fell ill and died in 209. Zhou Yu's successor Lu Su convinced Sun Quan to let Liu Bei "borrow" Nan Commandery in order to stabilize the situation on the western frontier. Meanwhile, Sun Quan established his capital at Jianye, in modern Nanjing. Sun Quan's attempts to capture territory north of the Changjiang ended in failure both in 208 and in 215. However, when he demanded the "return" of Nan Commandery from Liu Bei in 215, and was denied, Sun Quan moved west and occupied the commanderies of Jiangxia, Changsha, and Guiyang.

In 217 Cao Cao made a major attack on the south. Despite failing to achieve any real gains, Cao Cao stationed a substantial army in the area, threatening Sun Quan's territory forcing Sun Quan to act as a figurative subordinate to Cao Cao. In 219 Sun Quan's general Lü Meng attacked Guan Yu's position in Jing Province on advice from Sima Yi during Guan Yu's attack on Fan Castle. Guan Yu was caught off guard and killed while the southern province fell under Sun Quan's control. Liu Bei retaliated in 221 but failed to make any headway and the invasion was defeated by Sun Quan's general Lu Xun. In 226 Sun Quan launched attacks towards the south and annexed Jiaozhou. In 229, Sun Quan declared himself emperor of Eastern Wu, creating the last of the Three Kingdoms.

For the next 20 years, Sun Quan conducted several military campaigns in the north as well as an expedition to Yizhou in 230, but nothing ever came of these ventures. Noted for his longevity, Sun Quan was nevertheless unsuccessful as a military commander in comparison to his peers Liu Bei and Cao Cao. He died in 252 and was succeeded by his son Sun Liang.

==== Demise ====
After the death of Sun Quan, the dynasty became paralyzed by infighting. Sun Liang assassinated his guardian Zhuge Ke under the influence of a distant relative Sun Jun. When Sun Jun died in 256, he was succeeded by his cousin Sun Lin. In 258 Sun Liang sought to rid himself of his overseers but failed and was dethroned. He was replaced by Sun Xiu, sixth son of Sun Quan, then 22 years old. Sun Xiu staged a coup against Sun Lin and seized power for himself. Sun Xiu died in 264 and was succeeded by Sun Hao. However, by this time he could do little to stop the might of the Jin dynasty, which had just recently conquered Shu Han. Eastern Wu would itself be conquered in 280.

== Major warlords ==
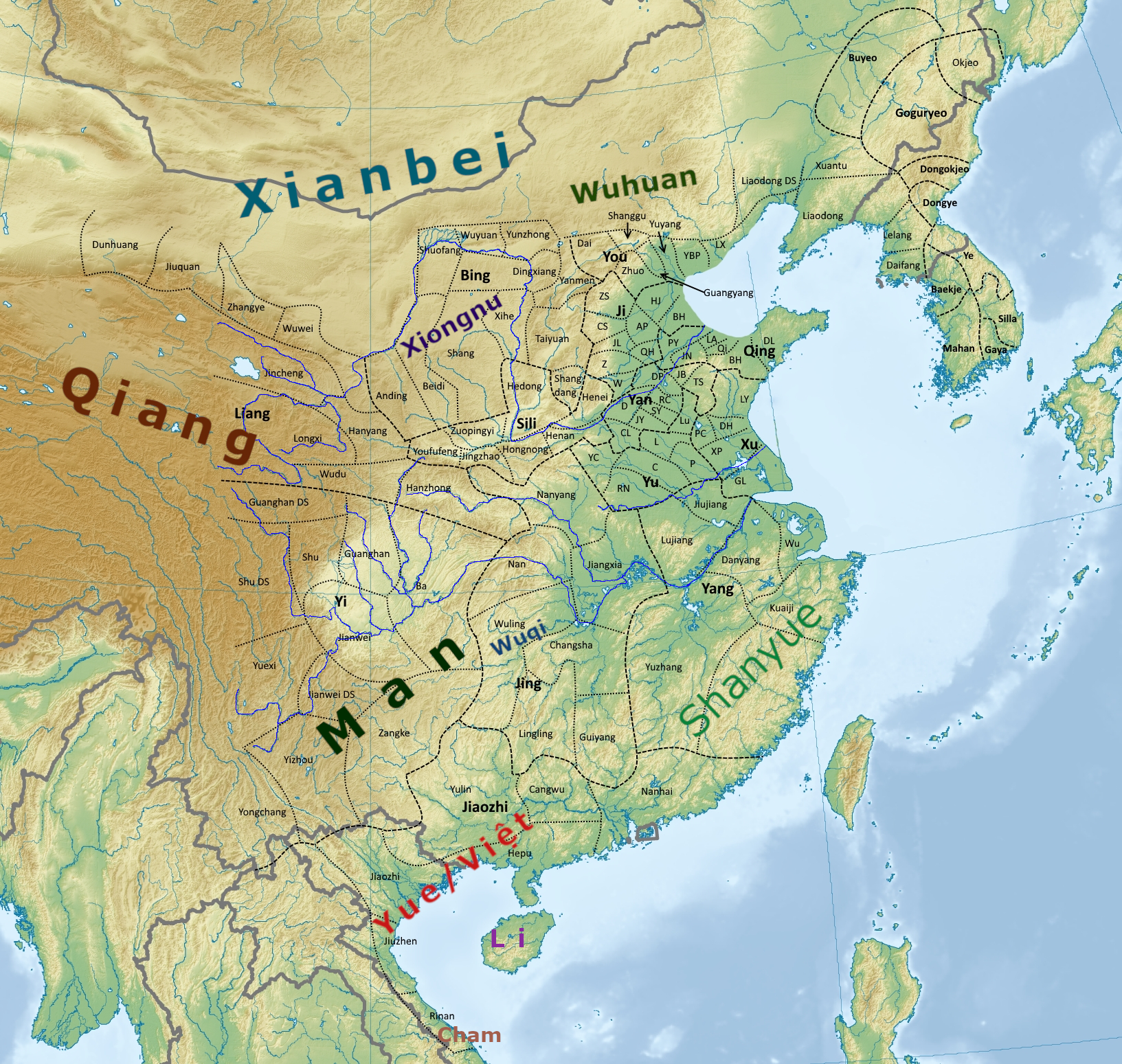
Late Eastern Han provinces and commanderies as well as nearby non-Chinese peoples

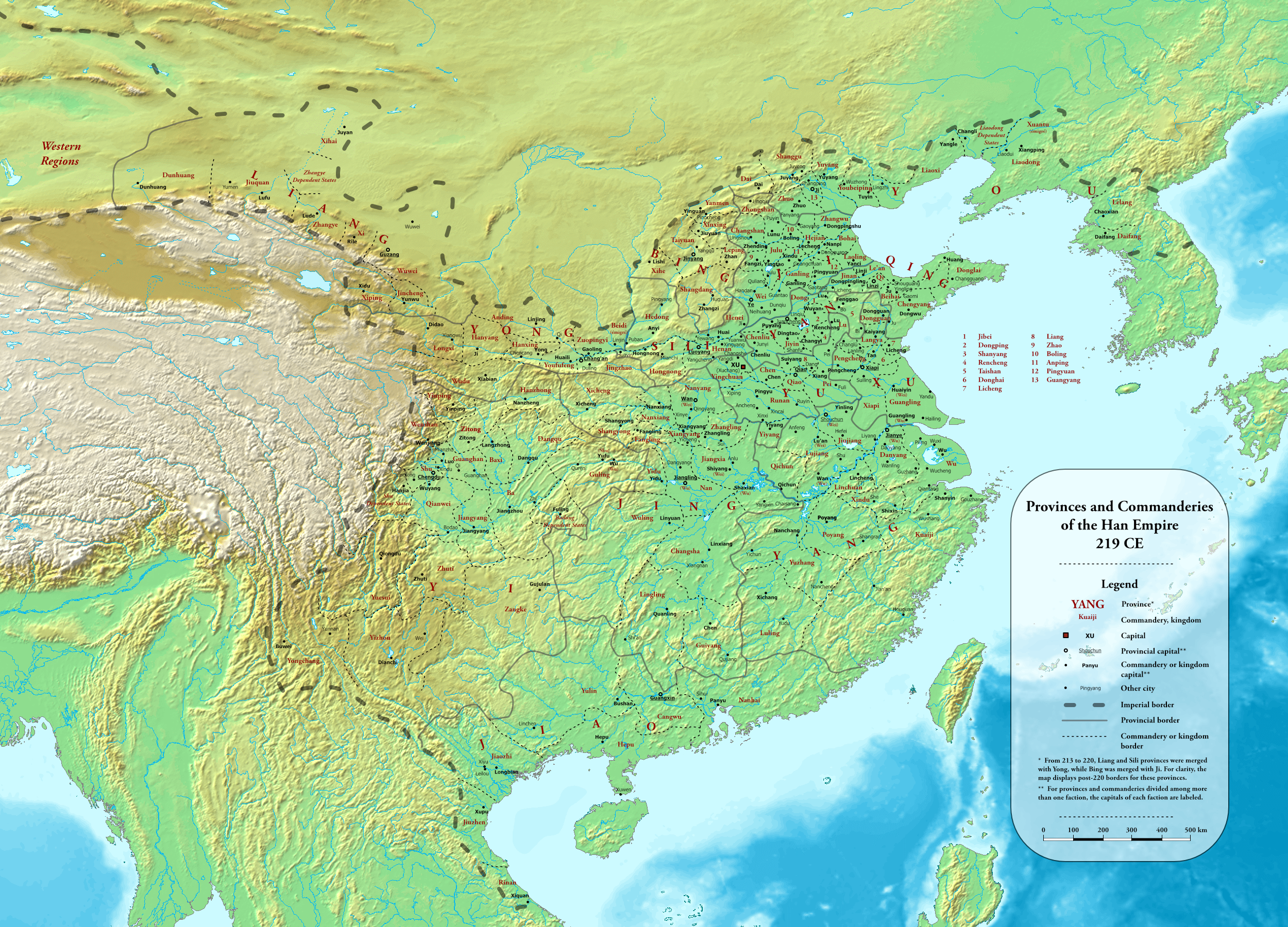
Commanderies in 219 AD

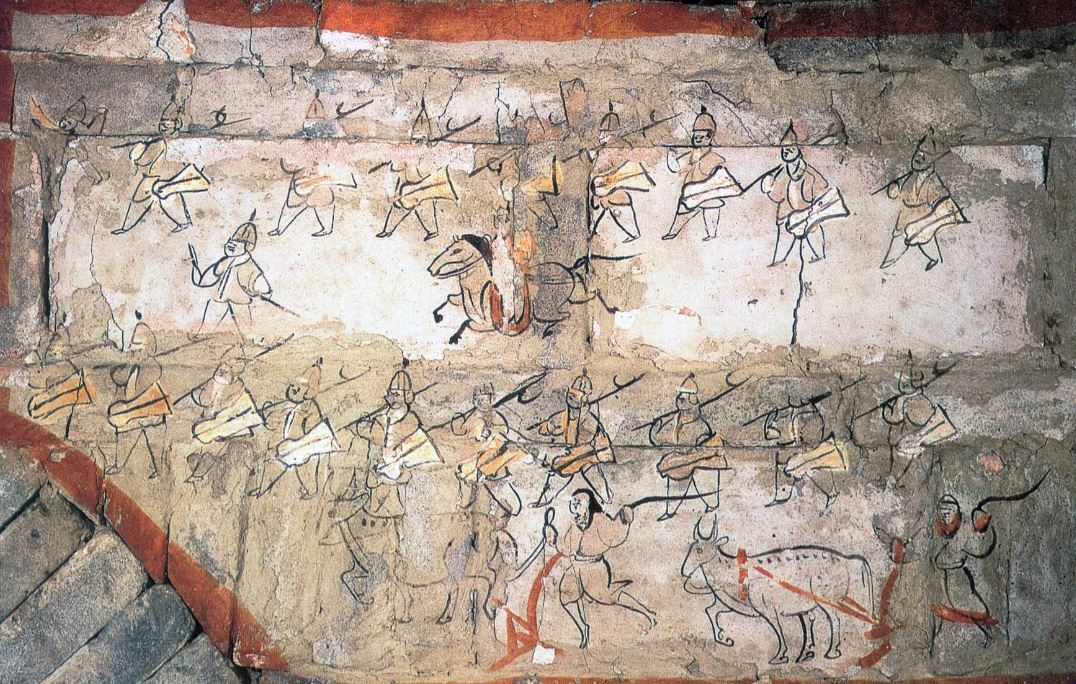
Mural of soldiers, Wei-Jin period

=== Dong Zhuo, Li Jue, and Guo Si ===
Dong Zhuo and his brother Dong Min were born to Dong Junya (hailing from Lintao, Longxi Commandery) in Yingchuan Commandery. As a youth, Dong Zhuo was reputed to possess immense strength and to carry two bows at each side. In 165 he became a major under Zhang Huan. For his service in defeating Qiang rebels, Dong Zhuo was promoted through the imperial ranks until he became Administrator of Hedong Commandery in the early 180s. In the summer of 184, Dong Zhuo was dispatched to take over overall operations against the Yellow Turban Rebellion, however he was unsuccessful in this endeavor, and dismissed in the autumn. Dong Zhuo was then dispatched as a subordinate general under Zhang Wen against the Liang Province rebellion. In late 185, Dong Zhuo and Bao Hong defeated the Liang rebels at Meiyang in Youfufeng Commandery. However, when they gave chase to the rebel forces, they were surrounded and forced to fight their way out. Dong Zhuo disguised his army as fishermen to escape the enemy forces. When they passed by, Dong Zhuo had his men destroy the river dam, blocking the enemy's path, and securing their retreat. Dong Zhuo refused to obey a summons from Zhang Wen, whose staff officer Sun Jian recommended he execute Dong Zhuo. Dong Zhuo later served in the imperial army against another group of rebel forces laying siege to Chencang in Youfufeng Commandery. The commanding general Huangfu Song defeated the rebels without heeding any of the advice Dong Zhuo gave him. It was said that Dong Zhuo was arrogant and insubordinate.

In 189, Emperor Ling of Han died. General-in-Chief He Jin called on Dong Zhuo to support his elimination of the eunuchs from power. However, by the time he reached Luoyang, He Jin had already been killed by the eunuchs, who were in turn killed by the guards. On 25 September, 189, Dong Zhuo took possession of the emperor Liu Bian and his brother Liu Xie, establishing his puppet regime in Luoyang. On 28 September he forced Liu Bian to abdicate in favor of his brother Liu Xie. Then he killed Liu Bian a few days later. In the spring of 190 the governors in the east formed a coalition and led a Campaign against Dong Zhuo. Pressured by the enemy alliance, Dong Zhuo moved the court west to Chang'an in the summer after plundering Luoyang. In the spring of 191 Luoyang was captured by Yuan Shu's general Sun Jian. On 22 May, 192, Dong Zhuo was killed by Wang Yun and Lü Bu, who were soon overthrown by Dong Zhuo's former officers, Li Jue, Guo Si and Fan Chou.

In 194 there was a brief war with Ma Teng and Han Sui who were defeated by Guo Si and Fan Chou. In 195 Li Jue killed Fan Chou and took over his troops. Guo Si turned on Li Jue and infighting between them went on for months until a ceasefire was called. In the confusion of the conflict, the emperor was able to escape Chang'an and fled east with the help of several supporters. The emperor reached Luoyang in 196 and was then taken to Yingchuan Commandery by Cao Cao. In 197 Guo Si was killed by his officer Wu Xi. In 198 a local warlord Duan Wei killed Li Jue.

=== Gongsun Du, Kang, Gong, and Yuan ===
Gongsun Du was born in Xiangping (Liaoyang, Liaoning). In his early years, Du's father fled to Xuantu Commandery, where Du became an office runner. Du attracted the support of the governor Gongsun Yu, whose daughter he eventually married. He rose up the ranks of officialdom in Ji Province until he became regional inspector.

Gongsun Du was appointed Administrator of Liaodong Commandery by Dong Zhuo in 189 on the recommendation of Xu Rong. As a result of his lowly origins, Du harbored an intense hatred for the elite landowning class. Once he became administrator, Du carried out his vendetta against the wealthy by publicly flogging to death the Magistrate of Xiangping and extirpating the gentry. Du dominated the northeast and expanded into the territory of Goguryeo and the Wuhuan. When Cao Cao attempted to bestow titles upon Du, he rejected them and proclaimed himself king. Du died in 204 and was succeeded by his son, Gongsun Kang. In 204 Kang expanded into Goguryeo and created Daifang Commandery. When the Wuhuan were defeated by Cao Cao in 207, Yuan Shang, Yuan Xi, and the Wuhuan leaders Louban and Supuyan fled to Kang. Kang killed them and sent their heads to Cao Cao. In 208, Kang sent aid to Balgi in support of his claim to the Goguryeo throne. Accounts differ on whether or not Balgi succeeded. The 12th century Samguk Sagi says he was defeated by Gyesu, younger brother of Sansang of Goguryeo, whereas Chinese records say that the invasion won, conquering territory where Balgi was settled. Regardless, in 209 Kang invaded Goguryeo again, took some territory and Goguryeo was forced to move its capital further east. Kang died in 220 when his children were too young to rule, so his brother Gongsun Gong succeeded him. Gong maintained his independence, albeit while accepting titles issued by Cao Pi. Gong became ill and was replaced by his nephew Gongsun Yuan in 228. Yuan ruled independently until Sima Yi invaded in 238 and annexed his territory.

=== Gongsun Zan ===
Gongsun Zan was born to a family of high officials and received education from Lu Zhi and Liu Kuan, in the process becoming friends with Liu Bei. He took office as a local officer in Liaoxi Commandery, where the administrator was so impressed with his appearance and booming voice that he gave his daughter to him in marriage. Later on, Zan became assistant magistrate of a county in Liaodong Commandery and made a name for himself fighting the Wuhuan and Xianbei. He was particularly known for leading a unit of mounted archers who only rode white horses. It was said that he was so well known among the Xianbei that they used his image for target practice. Despite Zan's success in halting Xianbei raids on Han territory, he was dismissed for losing a large portion of his men in an attack against numerically superior forces. Zan was eventually reappointed and given command of Wuhuan auxiliaries in 187 to deal with the Liang Province rebellion. For his service he was promoted to Commandant of Cavalry and went on to defeat the rebels Zhang Ju, Zhang Chun, and the Wuhuan chieftain Qiuliju in 188. However Qiuliju escaped and surrendered to the governor of You Province, Liu Yu. Liu Yu was rewarded with rank and enfeoffment, making Zan resentful of him.

When Dong Zhuo took power, he made Gongsun Zan a general in charge of Ji county in Guangyang Commandery under Liu Yu, who became Grand Marshal. In 191 Zan defeated a group of Yellow Turbans moving north from the Shandong Peninsula. His cousin Gongsun Yue died at the hands of Yuan Shao while on a mission to Yuan Shu, making the two enemies. He then seized a part of Ji Province but was badly defeated the next year. Recouping his losses, Zan defeated an invasion by Cui Juye and sent Tian Kai to invade Qing Province, which was also defeated. In 193 a truce was arranged, but Yuan Shao's ally Liu Yu attacked Zan anyway, and was defeated and killed. In 195 insurgents led by Xianyu Fu and Yan Rou removed Zan from power with the assistance of Yuan Shao's troops. Zan retreated to Yi city where he secluded himself with his harem. He managed to repulse one attack by Qu Yi before Yuan Shao brought his main army in 198 and laid siege to the city. Zan sent his son Xu to seek aid from Zhang Yan, leader of the Heishan bandits. However, by the time reinforcements arrived, Yuan Shao's sappers had already breached Zan's fortifications and Zan killed himself and his family rather than surrender. Gongsun Xu was later killed by the Chuge tribe of the Xiongnu.

=== Kong Rong ===
Kong Rong was a descendant of Confucius born in 153 to a minor government official, Kong Zhou, in Lu Commandery. As the sixth child Kong Rong showed great wit and harbored aspirations beyond his age. In 169, the reformist Zhang Jian fled the court in fear of the eunuchs and sought refuge at the Kong estate. Kong Rong hid him from the authorities until he left, but they came back later and arrested Kong Rong as well as his brother Kong Bao. Kong Bao claimed responsibility, arguing that Zhang Jian initially sought his aid while his brother only acted as the agent. He was executed.

In the late 170s, Kong Rong joined the offices of Yang Ci, from which position he fought the influence of the palace eunuchs. In 184, Kong Rong sought an audience with He Jin, who gave him employment in the Imperial Censorate. Kong Rong resigned from his position on grounds of disagreements with the head of the Censorate, Zhao She. Later he became General of the Household in charge of the palace guards.

When Dong Zhuo took power in 189, Kong Rong opposed the deposition of Liu Bian. As a result, Kong Rong was demoted and sent to deal with Beihai Commandery, which was experiencing serious troubles with banditry. As Chancellor of Beihai Commandery, Kong Rong sought to restore order by settling the people and building schools. However he was criticized as pretentious and ineffectual, having done little to deal with the Yellow Turbans and local bandits. In 193 he was attacked by the bandit leader Guan Hai. Kong Rong sent his subordinate Taishi Ci to seek aid from Liu Bei. Liu Bei sent a relief force and scattered the bandit army. In 196 Yuan Shao's son Yuan Tan attacked Beihai Commandery, but Kong Rong had made no preparations, and instead spent his time in literary pursuits. When Yuan Tan captured Beihai Commandery, Kong Rong fled to Cao Cao, who made him Court Architect. Kong Rong constantly demeaned Cao Cao's achievements and made fun of him but was tolerated due to his popularity at court. In 208 Kong Rong finally went too far and was killed for ridiculing Cao Cao in a self-righteous manner. His son and daughter were also executed.

=== Liu Biao ===
Liu Biao, a distant descendant of Emperor Jing of Han, was born in 142 in Shanyang Commandery. As a child, he studied under the Administrator of Nanyang Commandery, Wang Chang. In the 160s, Liu Biao joined the reformist faction at the Taixue of Luoyang. As a result, he was ousted from office in 169. When the Great Proscription came to an end in 184, Liu Biao was reinstated as a clerk in the offices of General-in-Chief He Jin.

In 190, Sun Jian killed Wang Rui, the Inspector of Jing Province. Liu Biao was appointed the new Inspector of Jing Province, but Yuan Shu was already in control of Nanyang Commandery, so he went further south and set up base in Xiangyang. He was attacked by Sun Jian in 191, but Sun Jian died almost immediately after in a skirmish. In the late 190s a rebellion by Zhang Xiu disrupted Liu Biao's territory until Zhang Xiu died in 200. He gave refuge to Liu Bei, who urged him to attack Cao Cao in 207, but Liu Biao declined. In 208 Liu Biao was invaded by Cao Cao in the north and Sun Quan in the south. Liu Biao died that autumn and his son Liu Zong surrendered to Cao Cao.

=== Liu Yan and Liu Zhang ===
Liu Yan was a descendant of Liu Yu, the fifth son of Emperor Jing of Han. Seeking to distance himself from the turmoil at the capital, Liu Yan sought and received appointment as Governor of Yi Province in 188. He set his headquarters at Mianzhu in Guanghan Commandery. Soon after he raised troops in the name of Dong Zhuo and appointed the sect leaders Zhang Lu and Zhang Xiu as officers. They were sent to attack Su Gu, the Administrator of Hanzhong Commandery, who defied Liu Yan. After Su Gu was defeated, Zhang Lu took Hanzhong Commandery for himself and eliminated Zhang Xiu. Liu Yan recruited troops from migrants and refugees from Central China, creating a unit known as the Dongzhou Troops (東州兵 dongzhoubing). The Administrator of Jianwei Commandery, Ren Qi and loyalist Jia Long attacked Liu Yan in 191, but they were defeated and killed. After moving his capital to Luo city, also in Guanghan, Liu Yan formed an alliance with Ma Teng in 194 and attacked Li Jue's regime in Chang'an. The campaign ended in failure and Liu Yan's sons Fan and Dan died in the attempt. Liu Yan died the same year after having moved his capital to Chengdu in Shu Commandery, where his son Liu Zhang succeeded him.

Liu Zhang put down an insurrection caused by Hu Mao, an agent of the Chang'an regime. In 200 Zhang Lu openly defied Liu Zhang, who in retaliation killed Zhang Lu's mother, who had been staying at his court as hostage. Zhang Lu invaded Liu Zhang's territory, occupying northern Ba Commandery. A follower of Liu Zhang also rebelled at this time due to grievances with the Dongzhou Troops, but he was defeated and killed. After Cao Cao's defeat at the Battle of Red Cliffs in 208, Liu Zhang formed an alliance with Liu Bei. When Cao Cao's general Zhong Yao was sent against Zhang Lu in 211, Liu Zhang invited Liu Bei to Guanghan hoping that someone from the same imperial clan would help him. Liu Bei spent the next year complaining about the lack of supplies, then turned on Liu Zhang, killed his officers, and waged war on him. By 214 Liu Bei's forces had advanced to Chengdu, where a siege lasting several weeks occurred before Liu Zhang surrendered. Liu Zhang was exiled to Jing Province where he eventually entered the court of Sun Quan when his general Lü Meng defeated Guan Yu in 219.

=== Lü Bu ===
Lü Bu was skilled in horse archery, possessing strength surpassing others, and was called the Flying General... Lü Bu also had with him a good horse named Red Hare capable of galloping so fast it could jump over city moats... There was a popular saying at the time, "Lü Bu [who stands out] among men, the Red Hare [which stands out] among horses"

— Sanguo Zhi

Lü Bu killed his patron Ding Yuan at the request of Dong Zhuo and became his bodyguard. In 190 Lü Bu was sent to plunder the tombs of Luoyang. His behavior was unruly and disruptive to his unit, causing his commander Hu Zhen to suffer defeat at the hands of Sun Jian. Lü Bu was also defeated and driven from Luoyang. Conflict between Dong Zhuo and Lü Bu soon came to a head and in 192 Lü Bu conspired with Wang Yun to kill Dong Zhuo. After ambushing and killing Dong Zhuo, Wang Yun's government was toppled by Li Jue in less than a month and Lü Bu was forced to flee to Yuan Shu but was turned away because of the unruly behavior of his men. Next Lü Bu visited Zhang Yang and then left when Li Jue offered a price for his head. In 193 he participated in Yuan Shao's campaign against the Black Mountain bandits. Once again the brutality of his men caused consternation and Yuan Shao sent Lü Bu back to Luoyang and ordered his escort to kill Lü Bu. Lü Bu managed to avoid assassination and fled. In 194 Lü Bu joined Zhang Chao and Zhang Miao's rebellion against Cao Cao in Yan Province. While initially successful, the rebel forces failed to take Puyang in Dong Commandery, and the tide turned against them. By the summer of 195 Lü Bu was forced to flee again, this time to Liu Bei in Xu Province. In 196 Yuan Shu attacked Liu Bei. Lü Bu switched sides, capturing Liu Bei's assets in Xiapi Commandery, and taking his surrender. After defeating Liu Bei, Lü Bu turned on Yuan Shu and drove back his army. The defeated Liu Bei later fled to Cao Cao, who in 198 sent Xiahou Dun to assist Liu Bei against Lü Bu. Lü Bu was unable to coordinate his commanders, who acted separately, and was driven back to Xiapi Commandery where his officers eventually betrayed him, opening the gates for the opposing army. When Lü Bu tried to persuade Cao Cao to accept him as a subordinate, Liu Bei argued against it. Lü Bu was strangled to death.

=== Shi Xie ===
Shi Xie was born to Shi Ci in Cangwu Commandery in the year 137. He attended the Taixue in Luoyang before returning home upon his father's death and took up the post of Administrator of Jiaozhi Commandery in the 180s.

After the Administrator Zhu Fu was killed in 190, Shi Xie and his brothers Yi, Wei, and Wu took full control of Jiaozhou. He ruled from his capital Long Biên (Luy Lâu) in modern Hanoi and brought prosperity to the region, taking in many refugees from the north. His brothers Yi, Wei, and Wu administered the commanderies of Hepu, Jiuzhen, and Nanhai respectively.

In 192, the southernmost district of Rinan Commandery, Xianglin, broke away and became the Kingdom of Lâm Ấp, otherwise known as Champa. Aside from this incident, Shi Xie's realm was relatively secluded from the state of endemic warfare and turmoil to the north. He provided support to the general Zhang Jin, situated in Cangwu and Yulin commanderies, in his conflicts with Liu Biao from 196 to 205, but stopped after the general's death. Shi Xie played no further role in the military affairs of the warlord states.

When Shi Wu died in 200, the Shi family lost control of the Pearl River region, but Shi Xie contented himself with ruling the reduced portion of Jiaozhi. Shi Xie was well disposed towards the northern warlords and acquiesced to Sun Quan's chosen Inspector of Jiaozhi, Bu Zhi, who visited Nanhai Commandery in 211. Shi Xie then sent his son Xin to Sun Quan as hostage in 217. Reduced to only Jiaozhi Commandery, Shi Xie died in 226 at the age of 90. His son Shi Hui was given the post of prefect in Jiuzhen Commandery while Chen Shi became prefect of Jiaozhi Commandery. At this point Sun Quan's agent, Lü Dai, decided to split Jiaozhou in half with the northern portion (Guangzhou) assigned to himself and the southern half, the new Jiaozhou, to Dai Liang. Shi Hui refused to let Dai Liang into the province and decided to rebel. His officials opposed him in rebelling against Sun Quan and laid siege to him in his capital, however they were unable to breach the city gates and were eventually forced to make peace. Lü Dai contacted Shi Hui's cousin and sent him with an offer of clemency on the condition that Shi Hui surrender peacefully. Shi Hui accepted the offer and together with his brothers and sons surrendered. Lü Dai reneged on his promise and beheaded them all, after which he abolished the two provinces, once again merging them together into Jiaozhou.

After Shi Xie's death, the southern frontier continued to be viewed as an area of barbarians in the Han imagination. When Xue Zong visited the south in 231, he described the place in the following manner:

Customs are not uniform and languages are mutually unintelligible so that several interpreters are needed to communicate... The people are like birds and beasts; they wear their hair tied up and go barefoot, while for clothing they simply cut a hole in a piece of cloth for their head or they fasten their garments on the left side [in barbarian style]... If district-level officials are appointed, it is the same as if they were not... According to the records, civilizing activities have been going on for over four hundred years, but, according to what I myself have seen during many years of travel since my arrival here, the actual situation is something else... In Rinan Prefecture, men and women go naked without shame. In short, it can be said that these people are on the same level as bugs.

— Xue Zong

Shi Xie is primarily remembered today in Vietnam as Sĩ Nhiếp, the father of education and Buddhism, which he patronized greatly during his reign. He was credited with compiling a dictionary of Classical Chinese terms explained in vernacular Vietnamese language several centuries later. According to Stephen O'Harrow, Shi Xie was "the first Vietnamese."

=== Yuan Shao, Shang, Xi, and Tan ===
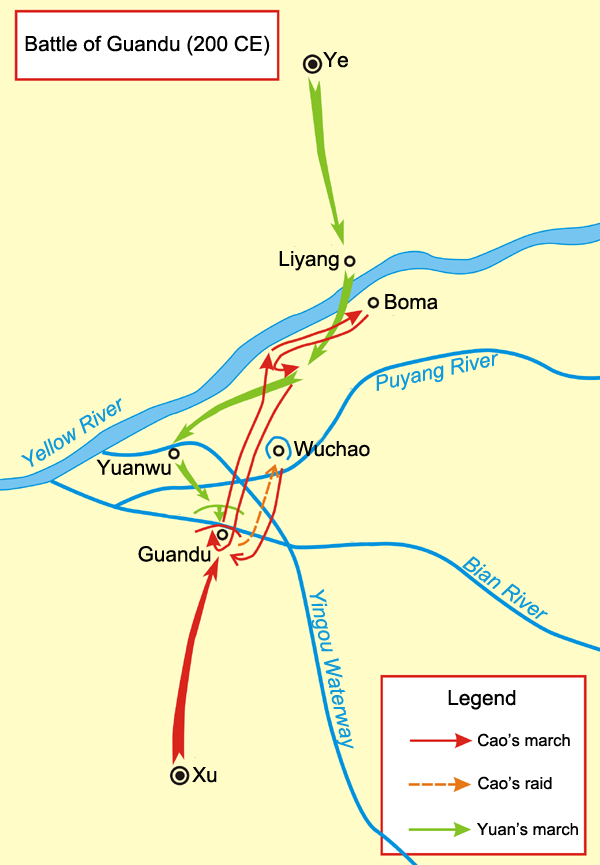
Battle of Guandu (220 AD)

Yuan Shao was born to a highly distinguished official family who had held office as one of the Three Ducal Ministers, the three highest posts below emperor, for three generations. The exact circumstances of Yuan Shao's birth and lineage are not clear but it's said that he was the son of Yuan Feng by a concubine, who then chose to adopt the lineage of his uncle Yuan Cheng (who lacked an heir). This was a source of contention between Shao and his half brother Yuan Shu, who was the son of Feng and his chief wife, making him senior to Shao within the Feng family. However, because Shao was adopted into the family of Feng's elder brother Cheng, he became the senior cousin, and higher up in the Yuan hierarchy than Shu. Envious of Shao's greater prestige and popularity, Shu referred to him as "our family slave" and claimed that Shao was not a true member of the Yuan clan.

Yuan Shao grew to be a handsome young man and a popular leader among his peers in Luoyang. At some point, he and Cao Cao raided a wedding, but after Cao Cao kidnapped the bride, he directed the pursuers to Shao. In the late 160s, Shao, then in his 20s, aided the reformist faction in escaping persecution by the eunuchs. After that he received appointment as a county magistrate in Dong Commandery. He then left office for six years to mourn the death of his adoptive mother and father. Upon returning to Luoyang, Shao entered the service of the Imperial Censorate, and rose through the ranks until he became a colonel in the Army of the Western Garden by 188.

Following the death of Emperor Ling of Han in 189, Yuan Shao urged He Jin to destroy the eunuchs. When He Jin was killed, Shao led a massacre of the eunuchs. After Dong Zhuo came to power, Shao fled east and formed a coalition army to embark on a Campaign against Dong Zhuo. Based in Suanzao in Chenliu Commandery, the coalition army met with little success throughout 190, so in 191 Shao took over Ji Province from Han Fu. When the coalition dissolved, Shao sent men against Yuan Shu's officer Sun Jian in Yingchuan Commandery. Gongsun Zan attacked Shao but was defeated at Jie Bridge between Julu and Qinghe commanderies. Shao set his capital at the city of Ye (Hebei) in Wei Commandery. In 193 Shao attacked the Black Mountain bandits and forced them into hiding. In 195, Zang Hong rebelled against Shao but was defeated and sentenced to death. Shao's follower Chen Rong criticized him of dishonorable conduct and was executed as well. With the support of the Wuhuan, he made the final attack on Gongsun Zan in 198 and eliminated him the beginning of next year. In 199 Shao became hostile to Cao Cao and moved against him. His army moved too slow however and in early winter of 200, Cao Cao destroyed two of his supply trains at the Battle of Guandu. His army scattered and fled. Shao became ill and died in 202. He was succeeded by his son Yuan Shang.

Cao Cao attacked in the autumn. By the summer of 203 Yuan Shang had been defeated and driven back to Ye, however Cao Cao decided to withdraw at this point. Shang came into open conflict with his brother Yuan Tan, who fled east. In 204 Shang besieged his brother at Pingyuan Commandery but Cao Cao moved against him at Ye and forced him to flee to Zhongshan Commandery where Tan attacked him. Shang fled again to his other brother Yuan Xi in You Province while Cao Cao attacked Tan at Nanpi in Bohai Commandery and killed him. In 205 Shang and Xi were ejected from their territory by mutineers and fled to the Wuhuan under Tadun, but Tadun was defeated by Cao Cao at the Battle of White Wolf Mountain in 207. They fled for the last time, this time to Gongsun Kang, who killed them and sent their heads to Cao Cao.

=== Yuan Shu ===
Yuan Shu was born to a highly distinguished official family who had held office as one of the Three Ducal Ministers, the three highest posts below emperor, for three generations. Despite acquiring a respectful reputation for himself and later becoming General of the Household Rapid as Tigers, Yuan Shu was ultimately overshadowed by his more popular and successful half-brother Yuan Shao.

Yuan Shu and Yuan Shao urged He Jin to kill the eunuchs at Luoyang. When Dong Zhuo took over, Yuan Shu fled to Nanyang Commandery. His army took part in the Campaign against Dong Zhuo under Sun Jian's command, but when Sun Jian returned from Luoyang, Yuan Shao became hostile and sent Zhou Ang against him. Yuan Shu allied with Gongsun Zan while his half brother allied with Liu Biao. Sun Jian soon died in a skirmish while on campaign against Liu Biao so Yuan Shu withdrew east to Chenliu Commandery where he was driven away as well by Cao Cao in 193. He then retreated to Shouchun in Jiujiang Commandery. The next year Yuan Shu sent Wu Jing against Governor of Yang Province, Liu Yao, with the extra help of Sun Ce in 195. In 196 Yuan Shu defeated Liu Bei in Xu Province with the aid of Lü Bu, who then changed sides and forced Yuan Shu's forces back to Shouchun. In 197 Yuan Shu declared himself emperor of the Zhong dynasty, which made everybody hate him. Sun Ce abandoned him while Cao Cao seized territory north of the Huai River. His fledgling dynasty was left in ruin and in 199 Yuan Shu attempted to escape to Qing Province, but was driven back to Shouchun, where he died outside the city. His family fled to Liu Xun, Administrator of Lujiang Commandery. Liu Xun later fled to Cao Cao when Sun Ce captured his capital. He was executed for extortion and corruption at a later date.

=== Zhang Lu ===
Zhang Lu was the head of a Daoist movement known as the Way of the Five Pecks of Rice. in 190 Liu Yan, Governor of Yi Province, sent Zhang Lu and Zhang Xiu (not related) against the rebellious Administrator of Hanzhong Commandery, Su Gu. Zhang Lu and Zhang Xiu killed Su Gu and took the territory for themselves. Zhang Lu killed Zhang Xiu and established a theocracy with religious Libationers as the primary civil authority. He preached confession of sins and the use of charms to cure illness. Minor wrongdoers were forced to become public servants who provided refreshments for travelers on the road. Alcohol was banned. In 200 Zhang Lu moved against Liu Zhang and seized northern Ba Commandery. His mother, who had been kept as a captive by Liu Zhang, was killed. In 214 Zhang Lu provided Ma Chao with some troops but when Ma Chao asked for more, he refused, after which Ma Chao turned to Liu Bei. In 215 Cao Cao attacked Zhang Lu. After his brother Zhang Wei was defeated, Zhang Lu fled to the Zong and Banshun natives for protection but they surrendered to Cao Cao and Zhang Lu was forced to submit as well. Cao Cao treated him well and his family was given honored positions at court. Zhang Lu died in Ye city in 216.

=== Zhang Yang ===
Born in Yunzhong Commandery, Zhang Yang was noted for his courage and fighting skills. He served as Assistant Officer for Military Affairs in Bing Province before joining the Army of the Western Garden as an acting major in 188.

In 189, General-in-Chief He Jin sent Zhang Yang to attack the hill bandits in Shangdang Commandery, however He Jin died later that year and Dong Zhuo seized power at the capital. Zhang Yang tried to seize Shangdang Commandery for himself. While he failed to oust the commandery's Administrator, he managed to gather several thousand followers while plundering the local counties. When the coalition against Dong Zhuo formed, he attempted to join it, but his partner the wandering Xiongnu mercenary Yufuluo forced him to attack Yuan Shao instead. They were defeated at the city of Ye. After that Zhang Yang received commission from Dong Zhuo as Administrator of Henei Commandery, so he based himself at Yewang across the Yellow River from Luoyang. In 192 and 193 he gave refuge to Lü Bu. When Cao Cao attacked Lü Bu at Xiapi in 198, Zhang Yang attempted to strike Cao Cao from the rear, but was killed by his own officer Yang Chou, who held a grudge against Lü Bu. After he defected to Cao Cao, Yang Chou was in turn killed by another officer Sui Gu who then attempted to seek help from Yuan Shao. He was defeated the following year by Cao Cao's officers Shi Huan and Cao Ren

== Minor warlords ==
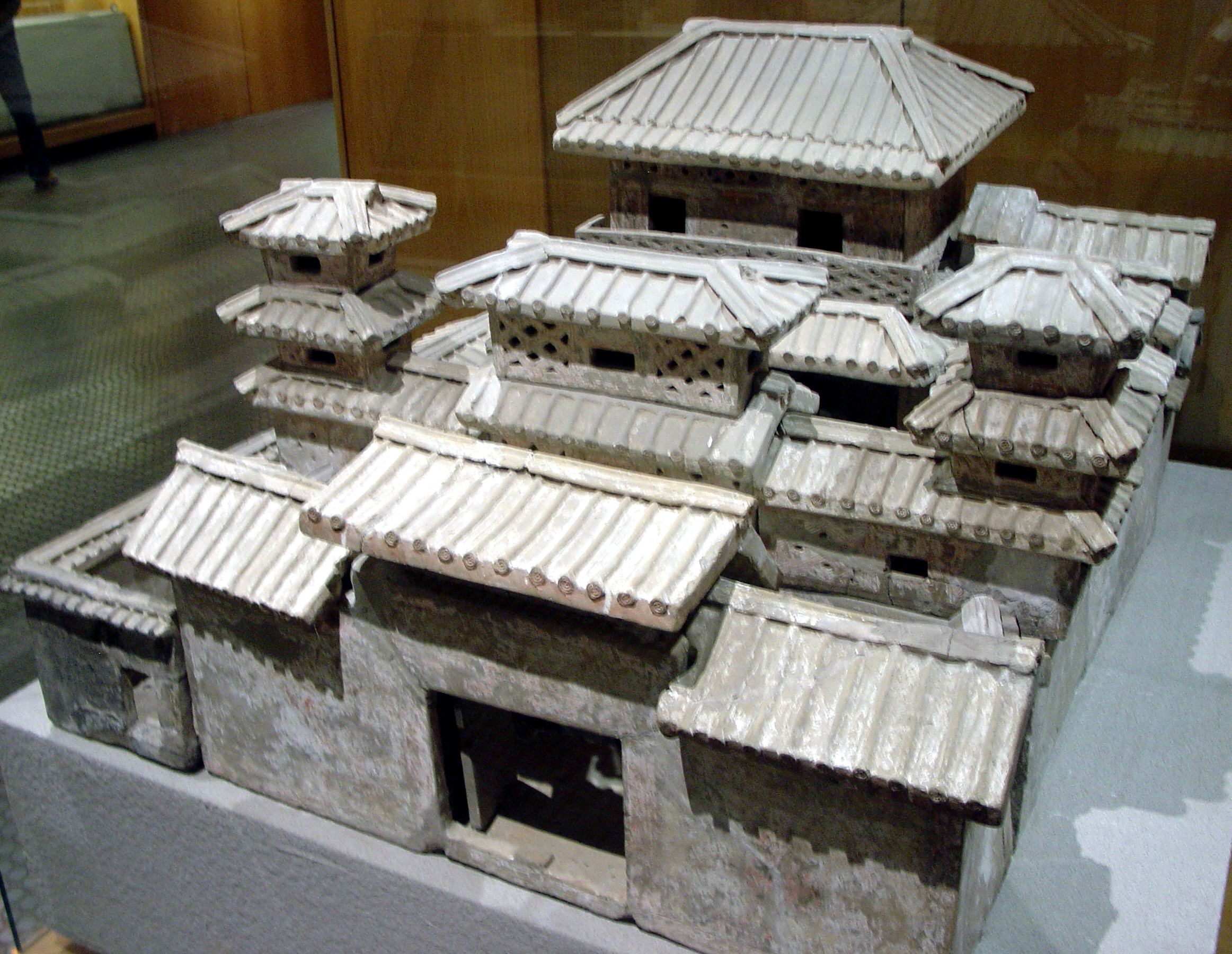
Ceramic model of a fortified manor of the Han dynasty, also known as wubao (塢堡), where warlords could command their private armies.

=== Gao Gan ===
Born to Gao Gong in Chenliu Commandery, Gao Gan was a nephew of Yuan Shao. He played an instrumental role in convincing Han Fu to hand over Ji Province to Yuan Shao in 191. As reward, Yuan Shao made Gao Gan Governor of Bing Province. In 202, Gao Gan joined the Southern Xiongnu chanyu Huchuquan in attacking Hedong Commandery. They were defeated and Huchuquan surrendered to Cao Cao's officer Zhong Yao. Gao Gan surrendered to Cao Cao in 204 but felt unsatisfied with his new position as Inspector of Bing Province. In 205, Gao Gao seized Shangdang Commandery and invaded Hedong Commandery. Gao Gan failed to take Ye and was driven back. In 206, Cao Cao personally led an attack on Gao Gao, forcing him to flee to the Xiongnu and then to the south in Jing Province, where he was captured and killed.

=== Han Fu ===
Han Fu was appointed Governor of Ji Province in 189. While he nominally participated in the Campaign against Dong Zhuo, he stayed at the city of Ye. After the coalition broke up, he became hostile to Yuan Shao in 191 and denied him supplies. Using his family connections, Yuan Shao intimidated Han Fu into handing over his position to him. After doing so, Han Fu's family was constantly harassed until they fled to Zhang Miao. He eventually killed himself.

=== Liu Chong ===
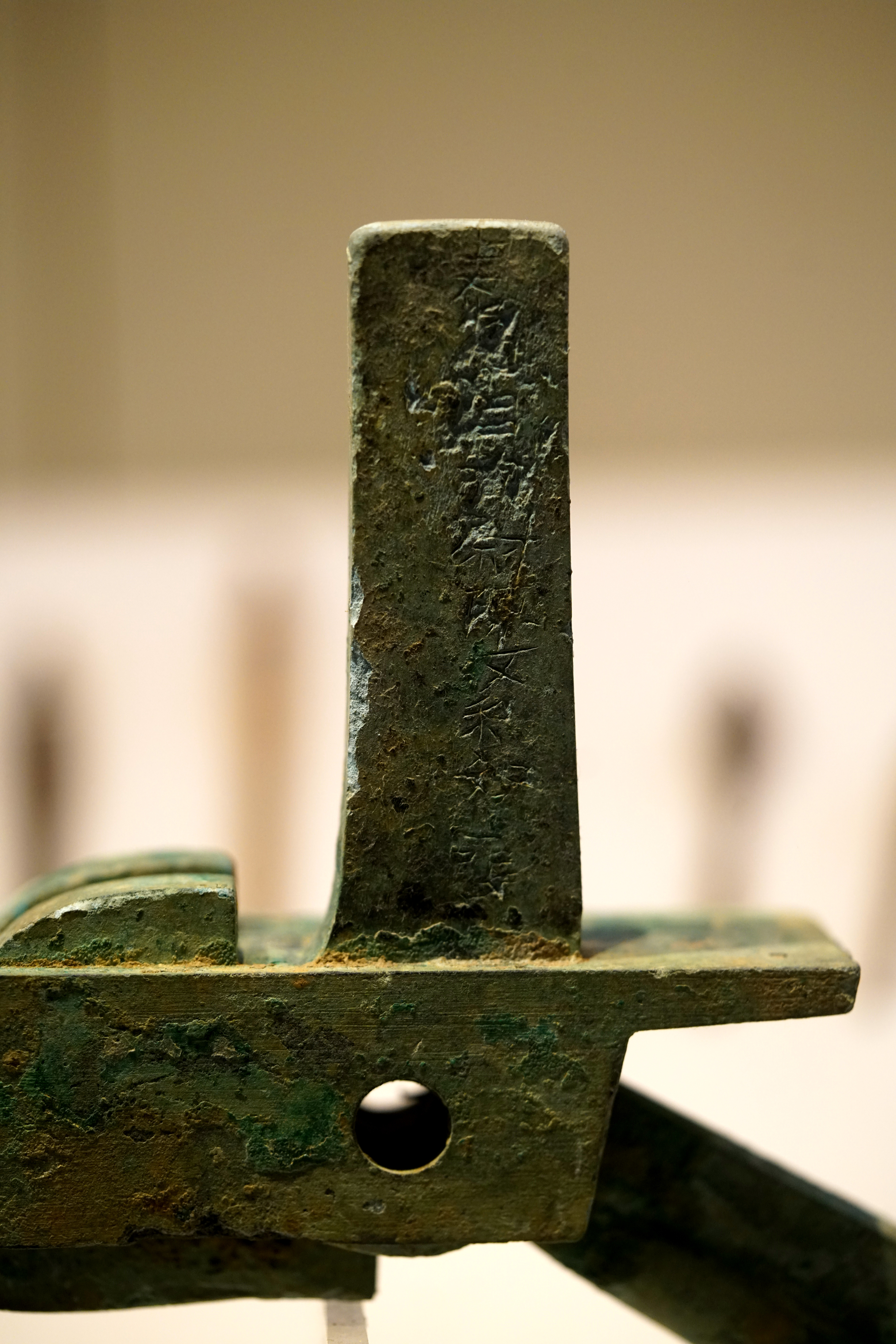
Crossbow with inscription, Eastern Wu period

Liu Chong, otherwise known as Prince Min of Chen, was the son of Liu Cheng. In 173, Liu Chong and former Chancellor Wei Yin offered sacrifices to Huang–Lao for good fortune, but the practice was seen as reprehensible by the senior officials. The official Shi Qian accused Wei Yin and Liu Chong of impiety. An official inquiry was carried out which resulted in the arrest of both Shi Qian and Wei Yin. They were both executed and no further investigation of Liu Chong occurred. Liu Chong was said to be a fine shot with the crossbow and had written a treatise on the weapon called the Nushe bifa. When the Yellow Turban Rebellion broke out in 184, he raised several thousand archers and brought them to the capital where his presence quelled any unrest. In 190, he formed an alliance with Dong Zhuo and styled himself General Who Supports Han while his Chancellor Luo Jun maintained his territory in Chen Commandery. When Yuan Shu's request for supplies was denied by Luo Jun in 197, he sent assassins who killed both Luo Jun and Liu Chong.

=== Liu Yao ===
Liu Yao, son of Liu Yu and nephew of Liu Chong, was born in 157 in Donglai Commandery. At the age of 18 he saved his uncle Liu Wei from a kidnapping. He became a county magistrate in Liang but resigned because he disapproved of the favor shown by the Chancellor to eunuchs. Liu Yao then served as an Assistant Officer in Qing Province and in the clerical bureau at the capital, but refused an invitation to join the Censorate.

In the 190s Liu Yao established himself in Danyang Commandery while his officer Zhu Hao held Yuzhang Commandery. In 195 Sun Ce defeated Liu Yao's forces and forced him to flee to Yuzhang Commandery, where Ze Rong had previously seized power. He eliminated Ze Rong but otherwise played no role in external affairs until 198 when he died. His family entered the court of Sun Ce and were treated well.

=== Liu Yu ===
Liu Yu, son of Liu Shu, held local office his county and became a magistrate in Donghai Commandery. It was said that his virtue protected the county from a plague of locusts. He was promoted to Inspector of You Province, where he wore the local clothing of fur and felt. His government was praised by the people and he received regular tribute from the non-Chinese. In 184, he was sent as Chancellor to Ganling, where his record of humane rule settled the hotbed of Yellow Turban discontent. In 188, he was sent back to You Province. As Governor, he persuaded the Wuhuan chieftain Qiuliju to surrender and murdered the rebel Zhang Chun. Yuan Shao suggested that he be made regent instead of Dong Zhuo or even take the throne for himself, but Liu Yu declined. Under Liu Yu's governorship, You Province prospered as a result of policies encouraging silk production, market trading, and production of salt and iron. The province's prosperity and low grain prices attracted many southern refugees. In 191 Liu Yu allied with Yuan Shao, and Gongsun Zan with Yuan Shu. In 193 Liu Yu attempted to oust Gongsun Zan, who had built a fortified camp within the walls of his capital in Guangyang Commandery, but failed. Gongsun Zan counterattacked, driving him from the city. Liu Yu was captured a few days later and executed.

=== Lu Kang ===
Lu Kang was born in 125 to an influential local family of Kuaiji Commandery. He served as an officer under the Administrator Li Su, who was later executed for his cowardice. Lu Kang escorted the Administrator's body home to carry out a full mourning, for which he gained a reputation for loyalty. He went on to become a magistrate in Bohai Commandery and ended the military levy there and governed the territory through honest and generous government. In 185, Lu Kang protested the extravagance and corruption involved in the rebuilding of palaces in Luoyang and as a result was dismissed for a time before he became a consultant at the capital. In 188, he became Administrator of Lujiang Commandery in 188. He put down the rebel chieftain Huang Rang and continued to send reports and tribute to the capital even as the Han dynasty fell apart. In 193, Yuan Shu asked Lu Kang for supplies and was refused. Yuan sent Sun Ce against Lu Kang, who surrendered after a two-year siege, in 195. Lu Kang died a month later.

=== Huang Ang ===
Huang Ang was the clan leader of Jiuquan Commandery until his family was massacred by the Administrator Xu Yi in 210. He subsequently attacked Xu Yi and killed him. Huang Ang was himself killed in 210 by the vigilante Yang Feng. His relative Huang Hua succeeded him and joined forces with Zhang Jin to oppose Cao Wei in 220. When Zhang Jin was killed Huang Hua surrendered.

=== Ma Ai ===
Ma Ai was the Administrator of Dunhuang Commandery until he died in 220. Zhang Gong succeeded him and willingly assisted Cao Wei in re-establishing control over the northwest.

=== Sheng Xian ===
Sheng Xian was a close friend of Kong Rong and Administrator of Wu Commandery. He left office in 193 took refuge with his former officer Gao Dai. It's not clear under what circumstances he left. One account suggests he became ill, another that Xu Gong took over by force. Sheng Xian was eventually killed by Sun Quan, who viewed him as a threat to his own authority.

=== Tao Qian ===
Tao Qian became Inspector of Xu Province in after 185. He dealt with the Yellow Turbans and restored order to the region, making the province prosperous and a refuge for displaced peoples. In 191 Tao Qian sent 3,000 men to support Zhu Jun against Dong Zhuo. In 193 he entered a loose alliance with Yuan Shu and Gongsun Zan, but that winter Tao Qian's soldiers killed Cao Song, Cao Cao's father. In retaliation Cao Cao brought the full force of his army down on him, ravaging Pengcheng and Xiapi commanderies. Tao Qian fled to Donghai Commandery in 194 and received the aid of Tian Kai and Liu Bei, but died from illness soon afterwards.

=== Wang Lang ===
Wang Lang was a scholar who studied the Book of Changes and compiled a commentary on it called the Yi Zhuan. He served as a gentleman cadet and county magistrate in Pengcheng Commandery. He left office when his patron Yang Ci died and refused invitations from the capital. In 191, Wang Lang became Headquarters Officer to Tao Qian. Tao Qian made Wang Lang the Administrator of Kuaiji Commandery, where Wang Lang established a luxurious court, which recorded one of the earliest local histories of China. In 196, Sun Ce invaded Wang Lang's territory and forced him to surrender, but Wang Lang refused to serve him. Two years later Wang Lang was allowed to leave for Cao Cao's court, where he would eventually rise to the position of Excellency under the rule of Cao Pi in 220. During his career he campaigned against the use of mutilation as a punishment and argued for the importance of education as a means to reduce the need for severe punishments. Wang Lang died in 228, leaving a collection of memorials and commentaries on the classics.

=== Xu Gong ===
Xu Gong took over Wu Commandery in 193. In 196 he was defeated by Sun Ce and forced to take refuge with Yan Baihu. In 200 Xu Gong allied himself to Cao Cao but was defeated in battle and executed. His retainers ambushed Sun Ce and killed him later that year.

=== Xu Zhao ===
Xu Zhao was a leader in southern Wu Commandery. He gave refuge to both Sheng Xian and Yan Baihu as they were driven from their territory in the north. Although Cheng Pu advised Sun Ce to attack Xu Zhao, Sun Ce refused out of respect for his willingness to help others in need. Xu Zhao was later destroyed by Sun Quan in 200.

=== Zhang Chao ===
Zhang Chao was the Administrator of Guangling Commandery in 190. He joined the coalition in the Campaign against Dong Zhuo. In 194 Zhang Chao joined his brother Zhang Miao in alliance with Lü Bu against Cao Cao in Yan Province. They were defeated and Zhang Chao was besieged in Yongqiu, Chenliu Commandery in 195. He killed himself and his family.

=== Zhang Jin ===
Zhang Jin was the Administrator of Zhangye Commandery. He joined Huang Hua in opposing Cao Cao in 220 but was killed by Su Ze.

=== Zhang Meng ===
Zhang Meng was the Administrator of Wuwei Commandery. In 206 Zhang Meng killed the Inspector Handan Shang and promised to pay retribution to anyone who attended to his corpse. An Assistant Officer loyal to Handan Shang carried out the mourning rites and went to Zhang Meng's residence to seek revenge for his superior. Recognizing his great sense of loyalty, Zhang Meng decided not to put him to death, and let Pang Yu leave for Jiuquan Commandery. In 210 Zhang Meng was defeated by Han Sui.

=== Zhu Jun ===
Zhu Jun's father died when he was very young. His mother raised him working as a silk seller. After working as a clerk in his local county office, Zhu Jun joined the commandery staff, where he spent almost 20 years before becoming Registrar to the Administrator Yin Duan. In 173, Yin Duan was reported by provincial authorities for failing to defeat the rebel Xu Chang, but Zhu Jun intercepted the letter, resulting in a reduced sentence for Yin Duan. Zhu Jun went on to become a magistrate in Donghai Commandery before he was sent to Jiaozhi in 181 as Inspector to deal with a rebellion by Liang Long. He raised 5,000 troops from his home in Kuaiji Commandery and defeated the rebellion within a matter of weeks. Zhu Jun was recalled to the capital and promoted to Counsellor Remonstrant. In 184, Zhu Jun and Huangfu Song were sent to deal with the Yellow Turban Rebellion in the south. They experienced some setbacks but managed to pacify Yingchuan, Runan, and Chen commanderies by autumn. Zhu Jun then moved to Nanyang Commandery and defeated the rebels there through deception. In 185, he was promoted again but left office when his mother died. He returned to the capital at some point and took up a number of posts.

When Dong Zhuo seized power in 189, he wanted to make Zhu Jun his chief assistant, but Zhu Jun refused in protest of moving the capital to Chang'an. Dong Zhuo left Zhu Jun in charge of Luoyang after he headed west for Chang'an. Zhu Jun defected to the coalition forces and moved south in 191 to Jing Province. In the following year, he was defeated by Dong Zhuo's commanders Guo Si and Li Jue. He returned to the imperial court after Dong Zhuo's assassination and served until 195 when he was taken captive by Guo Si, who had by then broken out in open conflict with Li Jue. Zhu Jun fell ill and died soon after. He was noted for being filial and generous to his peers.

== Former rebels ==
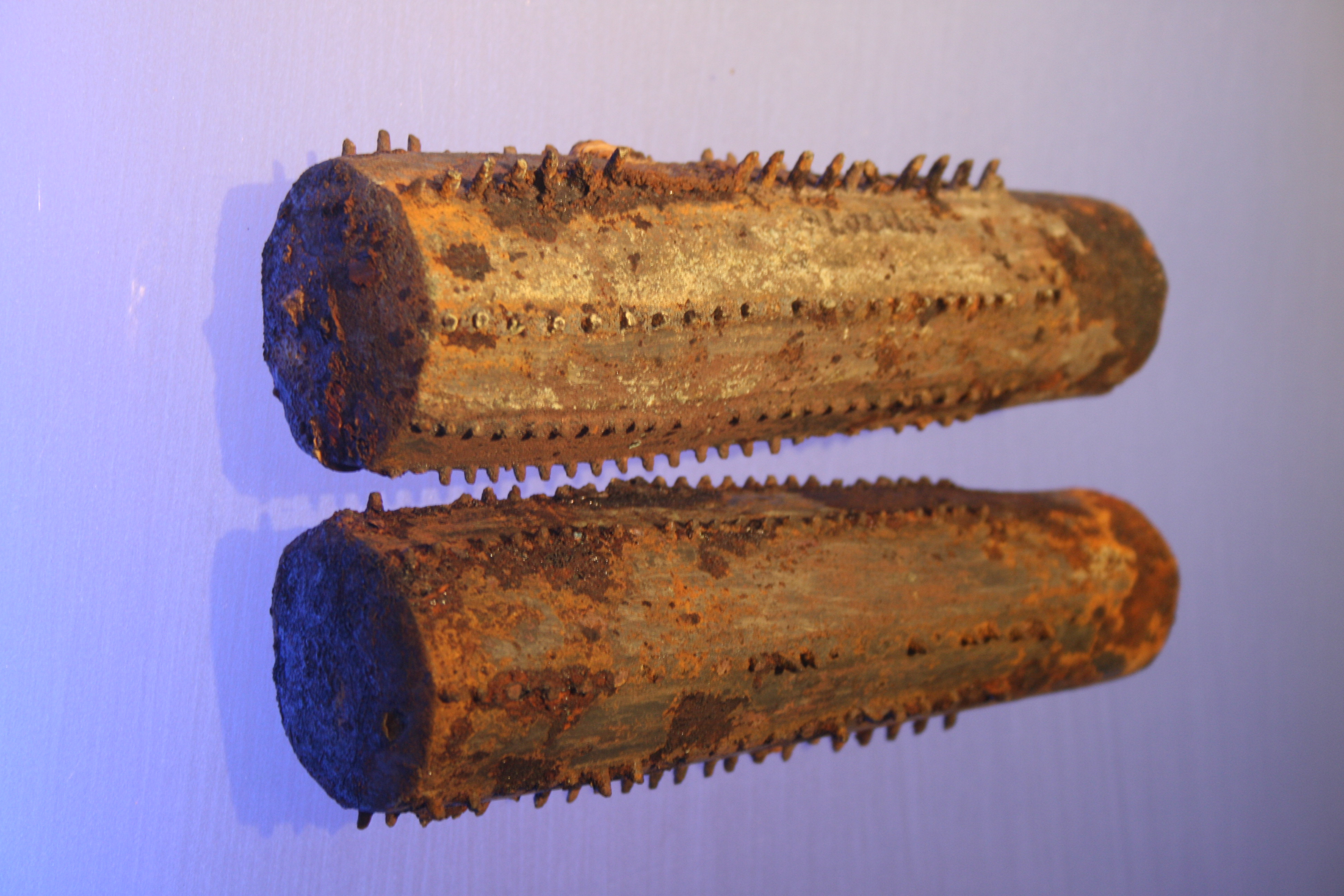
Bronze spiked cudgels, Han dynasty

=== Han Sui ===
Han Sui was born to an influential family in Jincheng Commandery. His father held appointment at the capital and in 178, Han Sui followed in his father's footsteps by becoming a Reporting Officer at Luoyang. During his stay at the capital, he became friends with Cao Cao, and was instrumental in urging General-in-Chief He Jin to eliminate the eunuchs. However He Jin was reluctant and after some time Han Sui returned to his homeland in the west, where he became Assistant Officer of Liang Province.

In 184, Han Sui and his colleague Bian Zhang joined Beigong Boyu in the Liang Province rebellion. Together they attacked Chang'an in 185 and 188/189. After their first failure to take Chang'an, Han Sui killed Beigong Boyu and seized command himself with Wang Guo as a figurehead. They failed to take Chang'an again in 189. Wang Guo was deposed and the rebel forces split up into three groups: Han Sui in Jincheng Commandery, Ma Teng in Longxi Commandery, and Song Jian on the upper Yellow River. He initially supported Dong Zhuo and his successor Li Jue, but turned on them in 194 when he joined Ma Teng in attacking Chang'an. They were defeated at Changping Slope northwest of Chang'an and Han Sui was forced to withdraw to Youfufeng Commandery. Han Sui fell out with Ma Teng, possibly due to the machinations of Cao Cao's agent Zhong Yao, and they began to skirmish with Ma Teng taking the heavier losses, causing him to join Cao Cao. In 210 Han Sui defeated Zhang Meng in Wuwei Commandery. In 211 Cao Cao sent troops against Zhang Lu. Believing that this was a preliminary attack on themselves, Han Sui and Ma Chao forged an alliance and confronted the enemy troops with initial success, driving them away. Later, Cao Cao personally led an army against the western alliance. When the three armies met at Huayin, Han Sui attempted to negotiate with Cao Cao and talked of the old days when they were friends at Luoyang, but Cao Cao's replies were mixed. The two sides agreed on a day to do battle. Han Sui and Ma Chao were defeated and forced to retreat. In 214 Xiahou Yuan drove Han Sui from Hanyang Commandery. Han Sui's officer Yan Xing rebelled against him and defected to Cao Cao. Han Sui died in 215 at the age of 70.

=== Ma Teng and Ma Chao ===
Ma Teng's family claimed descent from the famed general Ma Yuan, but his father was quite poor while his mother was of Qiang origin. Ma Teng grew to be quite tall at eight chi in height (185 cm). He made a living cutting firewood before joining the militia against the Liang Province rebellion.

Ma Teng rose to major under Inspector Geng Bi until Geng Bi was killed by mutineers in 187. Ma Teng then joined the mutineers, styling himself a general under the command of Wang Guo. After Wang Guo was defeated in 189, Ma Teng set himself up as an independent ruler in Longxi Commandery. When Dong Zhuo retreated to Chang'an, he persuaded Ma Teng and Han Sui to assist him against the other warlords. Ma Teng continued his allegiance to the Chang'an regime for a time even after Dong Zhuo's death and usurpation by Li Jue. In 194, he betrayed Li Jue and attacked Chang'an with the aid of Han Sui and supporters in Luoyang. Ma Teng and Han Sui were defeated at Changping Slope northwest of Chang'an and he retreated to Liang Province. Around 197 Ma Teng began to quarrel with Han Sui and their forces engaged in battle with Ma Teng losing the exchange. His son Ma Chao was wounded in battle by Yan Xing while his wife and other sons were also lost, forcing him to retreat to Youfufeng Commandery. He threw in his lot with Cao Cao in 202, sending Ma Chao to fight Yuan Shao's officer Guo Yuan in Hedong Commandery, and in 205 he himself campaigned against Sun Quan's officer Zhang Cheng. In 208 Ma Teng was enfeoffed but kept hostage in Ye while his son Ma Chao succeeded him in Liang Province. In 211 Ma Chao and Han Sui became hostile to Cao Cao. Ma Teng was killed the next year.

Ma Chao and Han Sui were defeated by Cao Cao at Huayin and retreated west. In 213 Ma Chao made an alliance with the Qiang and Di people as well as Zhang Lu. He then seized Hanyang Commandery. In the autumn an uprising by Yang Fu and Jiang Xu defeated Ma Chao and forced him to take refuge with Zhang Lu. Zhang Lu provided Ma Chao with troops to make an attempt to re-establish himself in Liang Province, but Ma Chao was defeated by Xiahou Yuan. Realizing that Zhang Lu would not provide him with any more troops, Ma Chao joined Liu Bei, who made him a general. Under Liu Bei, Ma Chao campaigned against Cao Cao in Wudu Commandery in 217 but failed to make any headway. Ma Chao died in 222.

=== Song Jian ===
Song Jian led an uprising in Liang Province in 184. After 185 he returned to his home county of Fuhan and declared himself King of the Sources of the River Who Will Pacify Han. In the winter of 214 Cao Cao's general Xiahou Yuan attacked Fuhan and killed Song Jian and his officers.

== Bandits ==
=== Congqian ===
Congqian's name means "Follow Money". He was a bandit active in Donglai Commandery until put down by He Kui and Zhang Liao in 200.

=== Gan Ning ===
Gan Ning was the leader of an influential vigilante bandit group in Ba Commandery known for their expertise with bows and crossbows. Gan Ning treated local officials who aided him generously but plundered the territories of those who did not. Later he abandoned his life as a youxia and studied philosophy.

When Liu Yan, the Governor of Yi Province, died in 194, his son Liu Zhang refused to hand over the province to the court appointed Inspector, Hu Mao. Gan Ning aided Hu Mao in his conflict with Liu Zhang but they were defeated. Gan Ning fled with 800 followers to Liu Biao and then Huang Zu, who treated him with disdain due to his past history as a bandit. At the Battle of Xiakou in 203, Huang Zu's fleet was defeated in an attack by Sun Quan, and he himself was nearly captured until Gan Ning killed the enemy general, Ling Cao, with an arrow. Despite being saved by Gan Ning, Huang Zu continued to treat his savior coldly and refused to bestow upon him any rewards or promotions. He even tried to induce Gang Ning's men to abandon him.

In 207, Gan Ning was assigned to an eastern border post with the help of a sympathetic officer, Su Fei. From there he crossed over the border and defected to Sun Quan, where he found better terms of service. When Huang Zu was destroyed by Sun Quan in the following year, Gan Ning spoke in favor of Su Fei, saving his life. Gan Ning participated in several following campaigns, notably at the Battle of Yiling where he held off Cao Ren's forces long enough for reinforcements to arrive despite being outnumbered five to one. In 215, he maintained the rearguard when Sun Quan was defeated at the Battle of Xiaoyao Ford, saving his lord's life. In 217, he took a small raiding party into Cao Cao's main camp at the Battle of Ruxu and decimated the enemy forces. Gan Ning died in 220.

=== Gong Du ===
Gong Du was a bandit in Runan Commandery. In 200, Gong Du allied with Yuan Shao and with the assistance of Liu Bei killed Cao Cao's officer, Cai Yang. The next year Cao Cao retaliated, forcing Liu Bei to flee, and scattering Gong Du's followers.

=== White Tiger Yan ===
Yan Baihu, or "White Tiger Yan", was a bandit leader of possibly Shanyue origins. When Sun Ce came to Wu Commandery in 195, Yan Baihu gave refuge to the displaced Xu Gong and threatened the flank of Sun Ce's army. However Sun Ce paid him no attention and the two avoided any altercations. In 197, Cao Cao's agent Chen Yu provoked Yan into rebellion. Sun Ce sent Lü Fan to drive out Chen Yu while he himself attacked Yan. The defeated Yan fled south to join Xu Zhao but died soon afterwards. Remnants of Yan's band joined Xu Gong in 200 to threaten Sun Ce's rear as he attacked Huang Zu in the west. Sun Ce decided to retreat and finish off the bandits once and for all, only to fall into an ambush and die at their hands.

=== Yang Feng ===
Yang Feng was a leader of the Bobo bandit group in Xihe Commandery. He joined Li Jue but rebelled against him in 195. In 196 Yang Feng aided Emperor Xian of Han in escaping the capital. Dong Zhao approached Yang Feng on behalf of Cao Cao and convinced him to let the emperor travel to Xu city. Later Yang Feng tried to interfere in the move and was defeated by Cao Cao in battle, after which he fled to Yuan Shu. In 197 Yang Feng rebelled against Yuan Shu in support of Lü Bu, however Lü Bu did not come to his aid and Yang Feng was forced to flee to Liu Bei. Liu Bei invited him to a banquet, at which he was bound and killed.

=== Zhang Yan ===
Zhang Yan, originally Chu Yan, was the leader of a bandit group in the Taihang Mountains in 184. At some point he joined another bandit, Oxhorn Zhang, but Zhang was fatally wounded in a raid and died soon afterwards. His last act was to transfer his men over to Chu Yan, who took the name of Zhang to honor his patron. Zhang Yan went on to create a bandit confederacy known as the Black Mountain bandits that ravaged the neighboring commanderies of Changshan, Zhao, Zhongshan, Shangdang, and Henei. In 190 Zhang Yan had a loose alliance with Gongsun Zan against Yuan Shao. In 193 Yuan Shao attacked the Black Mountain bandits, forcing them off the southern hills and into the mountains. When Yuan Shao made his final attack on Gongsun Zan in 199, Zhang Yan tried to save him but failed. Zhang Yan surrendered to Cao Cao when he took over Ji Province in 205. He was made a general as well as a marquis.

=== Zheng Jiang ===
A woman bandit active in Dongping Commandery about 210. Apparently her appearance was foretold in a dream of Liu Zhen, one of Cao Cao's staff, where she was represented by a snake with four legs. She was defeated soon after. It is not clear in the text if she was a single person or two women named Zheng and Jiang.

=== Zu Lang ===
Zu Lang was a local leader who defeated Sun Ce in a skirmish in 194 and then driven into the southern hills by Wu Jing, Sun Ce's maternal uncle. He was eventually captured but Sun Ce showed him no ill will and recruited him into his staff.

== Yellow Turbans ==
Zhang Rao, Guan Hai, He Man, He Yi, Huang Shao, Liu Pi, Xu He, and Sima Ju were leaders of the Yellow Turbans during the early 190s. They had substantial followings numbering in the tens of thousands.

In 192, Zhang Rao defeated Kong Rong's forces.

In 193, Guan Hai besieged Kong Rong but was defeated by Liu Bei.

In 196, Cao Cao took to the field against the other Yellow Turbans and defeated Huang Shao, after which He Man and He Yi surrendered.

In 200, Liu Pi supported Yuan Shao's invasion from the north by plundering the region around Cao Cao's headquarters at Xu city. He was later joined by Liu Bei, whom Yuan Shao sent to assist him, but they were defeated by Cao Ren. Liu Pi was killed.

In 206, Sima Ju and Xu He attacked a number of cities in Qing Province. Cao Cao sent Xiahou Yuan, Zang Ba, and Lü Qian with a large force to deal with them. After several engagements and heavy casualties on both sides, the two Yellow Turban rebels were killed.

== Non-Han actors ==
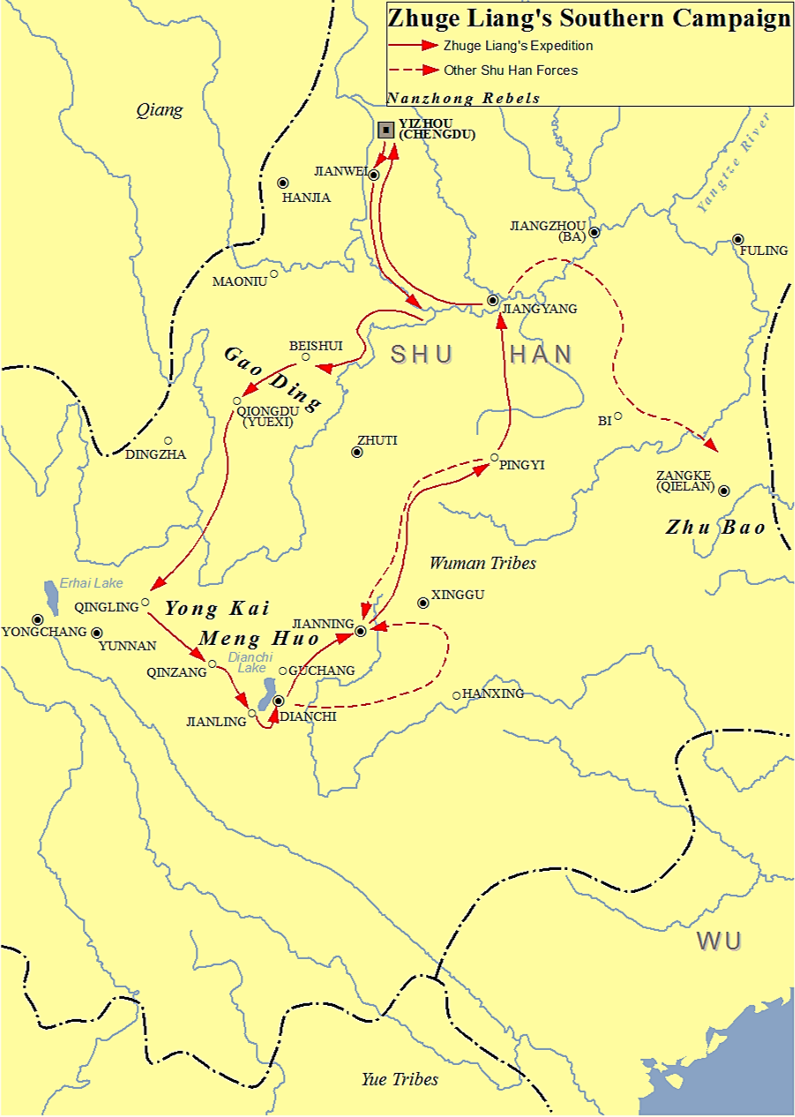
Zhuge Liang's Southern Campaign

=== Di ===
The Di (氐; not to be confused with the Northern "Di" (狄)) were a farming people related to the Qiang living in what is now eastern Gansu Province. Many of the Di tribes had become vassals to the Han dynasty since the 2nd century BC and maintained a relatively peaceful relationship for the most part. However, the Di began to frequently rebel during and after the fall of Han.

In the 210s, the Di tribes such as the ones led by Agui (阿貴) and Qianwan (千萬) allied themselves with the northwestern warlords, Ma Chao, Han Sui and Zhang Lu. After they were defeated, many of the Di came under the control of Cao Cao. Their homeland soon became a frontier between the Cao Wei and Shu Han, and the Di tribes often vacillated their allegiance between the two sides. In 219, Cao Cao, looking to deter them from allying with Liu Bei, had 50,000 of the Di people relocated north to the commanderies along the Wei River. During the northern expeditions of Zhuge Liang and Jiang Wei, winning and maintaining the support of the Di tribes, along with the Qiang and other ethnic minorities in the region, became a strategic objective for both Wei and Shu Han. The Di also joined the Xianbei, Tufa Shujineng when he rebelled against the Western Jin dynasty between 270 and 280.

The Di went on to form three of the later Sixteen Kingdoms: Cheng-Han (304–347), Former Qin (351–394) and Later Liang (386–403).

=== Goguryeo ===
The Korean kingdom of Goguryeo was invaded by Gongsun Kang in 204, resulting in the Daifang Commandery. In 208, Kang sent aid to Balgi in support of his claim to the Goguryeo throne. According to the 12th century chronicle Samguk Sagi, the invasion was defeated by Gyesu, younger brother of Sansang of Goguryeo. However this is not reported in the Chinese records, which state that the invasion was a success and Balgi was settled in conquered territory. K.H.J. Gardiner says that this is because the Samguk Sagi sought to reverse the reality of defeat in a number of instances and questioned both the existence of Gyesu and his victory. Gongsun Kang took some territory and Goguryeo was forced to move its capital further east. Goguryeo re-established in its former territory and established dominance over the tribes at the mouth of the Yalu River sometime before 233. In 238, Goguryeo allied with Cao Wei to overthrow the Liaodong regime. Goguryeo raided the Xuantu Commandery in 242. In retaliation, Cao Wei invaded Goguryeo from 244 to 245. The Wei general Guanqiu Jian sacked the Goguryeo capital of Hwando, sent its king fleeing, and broke the tributary relationships between Goguryeo and the other tribes of Korea that formed much of Goguryeo's economy. Although the king evaded capture and eventually settled in a new capital, Goguryeo was reduced to such insignificance that for half a century there was no mention of the state in Chinese historical texts.

Goguryeo lies a thousand li to the east of Liaodong, being contiguous with Joseon and Yemaek on the south, with Okjeo on the east, and with Buyeo on the north. They make their capital below Hwando. With a territory perhaps two thousand li on a side, their households number three myriads. They have many mountains and deep valleys and have no plains or marshes. Accommodating themselves to mountain and valley, the people make do with them for their dwellings and food. With their steep-banked rivers, they lack good fields; and though they plow and till energetically, their efforts are not enough to fill their bellies; their custom is to be sparing of food. They like to build palaces... By temperament the people are violent and take delight in brigandage... As an old saying of the Dongyi would have it, they are a separate branch of the Buyeo. And indeed there is much about their language and other things they share with the Buyeo, but in temperament and clothing there are differences.

Their people delight in singing and dancing. In villages throughout the state, men and women gather in groups at nightfall for communal singing and games. They have no great storehouses, each family keeping its own small store... They rejoice in cleanliness, and they are good at brewing alcohol. When they kneel in obeisance, they extend one leg; in this they differ from the Buyeo. In moving about on foot they all run... In their public gatherings they all wear colorfully brocaded clothing and adorn themselves with gold and silver.

— Sanguo Zhi

=== Lâm Ấp ===
The Cham are an Austronesian ethnic group that live in modern-day Vietnam and Cambodia. Under the Han dynasty, the Cham lived in Jiao Province, particularly in Xianglin, the southernmost district of Rinan Commandery. In either 137 or 192 AD, the son of a Cham official, Khu Liên, killed the local Chinese administrator in Xianglin and declared himself the King of Lâm Ấp, known as Linyi (林邑) in Chinese.

With the fall of Han, the Lâm Ấp then came into contact with the Eastern Wu dynasty. Though initially paying tribute to Wu, they soon adopted an aggressive stance against their new northern neighbour. In 248, Lâm Ấp seized the Lurong County (盧容縣; around present-day Huế, North Central Coast, Vietnam) in Rinan after a great battle. Due to the ensuing rebellions in Jiuzhen and Jiaozhi commanderies involving Lady Triệu, the Wu was unable to retaliate. During the late Wu period, the Lâm Ấp king, Phạm Hùng, allied with the Kingdom of Funan and launched incessant attacks on Jiao province. These attacks ended by 284, as they attempted to establish ties with Western Jin dynasty.

=== Lushuihu ===
The Lushuihu, literally meaning "Black River Barbarians", was an ethnic group that resided around the area of modern-day Gansu. Their exact origin is still debated by scholars today; it is proposed that "Lushuihu" was a generic term for hu tribes that lived in northwestern China, but there are also theories suggesting that they were descendants of the Lesser Yuezhi that intermingled with the Qiang people, or that they were a branch of the Xiongnu. In 222, their leaders, Zhiyuanduo (治元多) and Yijiianjiqie (伊健妓妾) rebelled in the Hexi Corridor but was swiftly defeated by Cao Wei forces. The Lushuihu later founded one of the Sixteen Kingdoms, Northern Liang (397–439).

=== Nanman ===
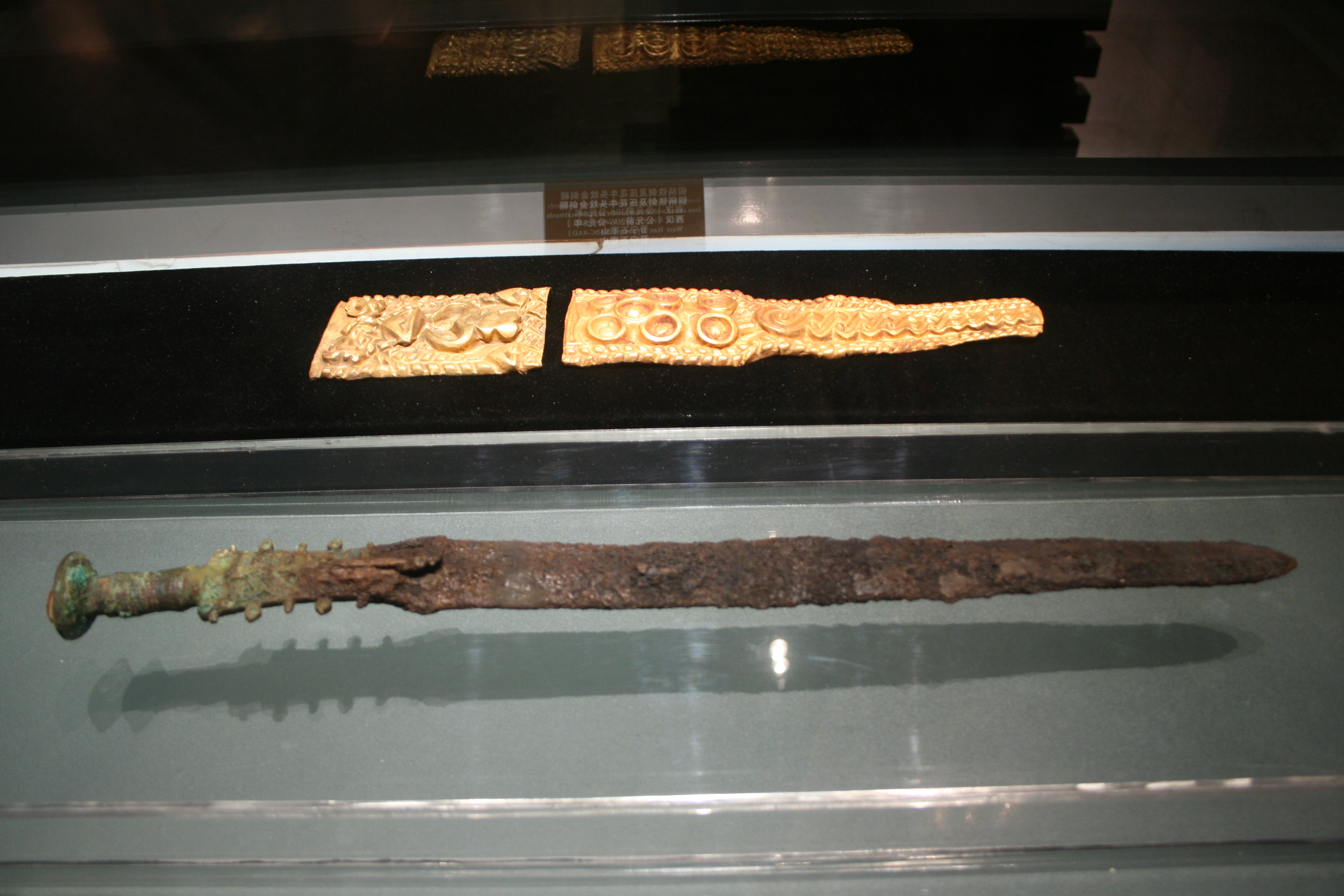
Bronze sword with elaborate hilt, from Yunnan, Han dynasty

==== Banshun and Zong ====
The Banshun, also known as the Bandun Man, which literally means "board shield barbarians", were a native people of Ba Commandery, Yi Province, who often served as elite troops in the Han army against other peoples such as the Qiang and the natives of Wuling Commandery. They rebelled in 179 due to unrest caused by the Yellow Turban Rebellion, but when amnesty was issued by Cao Qian in 182, the rebellion was ended. There was another brief uprising in 188 but it amounted to nothing. Related to the Banshun were the neighboring Zong people, who became interested in the mysticism of the Celestial Master Zhang Lu and moved north to the border of his territory. When Cao Cao attacked Zhang Lu in the summer of 215, he fled to Duhu of the Zong and Fuhu of the Banshun for refuge. However Duhu and Fuhu surrendered to Cao Cao in the autumn and received appointment, with Zhang Lu following in the winter. In 219 Liu Bei's officer Huang Quan attacked them and drove several non-Chinese groups north into Cao Cao's territory. In the north, the Zong people mingled with the local Di people and became known as the Ba Di, which later found one of the Sixteen Kingdoms, Cheng-Han (304–347)

==== Gaoding ====
Gaoding was a powerful chieftain in Yuexi Commandery. In 218 he led an attack on Jianwei Commandery but was repelled by the Administrator Li Yan. He caused trouble again in 223 and was killed in Zhuge Liang's Southern Campaign two years later.

==== Meng Huo ====
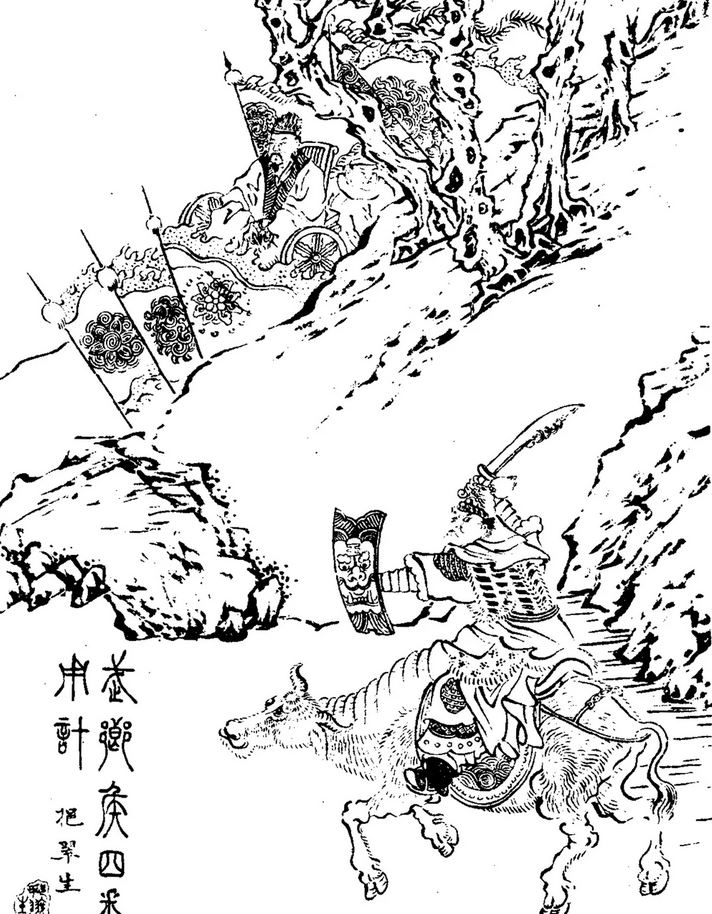
Meng Huo riding into battle on his red ox

Meng Huo was a local leader of the Nanman mentioned in Annotations to Records of the Three Kingdoms by Pei Songzhi. In 225, Meng Huo rebelled with Yong Kai. He was captured by Zhuge Liang seven times before he surrendered. Meng Huo's role was greatly expanded upon in Romance of the Three Kingdoms, in which he is portrayed as the king of the Nanman and husband to Lady Zhurong, a descendant of the God of Fire. In the Romance, Meng Huo was described riding a red horse, wearing a golden inlaid headdress, a belt with a clasp in the image of a lion's face, boots with pointed toes that were green, and a pair of swords chased with pine amber at his waist. Later he rode into battle on a red ox, wearing rhinoceros armour while wielding shield and sword. He enlisted the aid of his fellow kings Wutugu, who commanded an army of 30,000 invincible rattan armour troops, and Mulu, who rode a white elephant and deployed wild beasts in battle. Although his allies were defeated by Zhuge Liang's anachronistic gunpowder weapons and killed, Meng Huo was repeatedly captured and released until he surrendered and became a local administrator.

==== Yong Kai ====
Yong Kai was a powerful chieftain in Yizhou Commandery. In 215, Yong Kai killed the Administrator Zheng Ang and defected to Sun Quan. Sun Quan named Yong Kai Administrator of Yongchang Commandery but actually distrusted him and ordered his officers to keep him out of that territory. In 223, Yong Kai captured the Administrator Zhang Yi and sent him to Sun Quan. In 225, Yong Kai was killed by another chieftain, Gao Ding.

=== Qiang ===
The Qiang referred to groups of western pastoral nomads that lived in areas of present-day Gansu and Qinghai. Since the Western Han dynasty, the Qiang had been migrating in large groups into the Guanzhong region to practice agriculture. They had a troubled relationship with the Han; though they were occasionally allowed to resettle, they also suffered oppression at the hands of the local Chinese administrators, leading to rebellions that drained the Han military and economy. In 156 AD, the general, Duan Jiong led an extermination campaign against the Qiang, massacring a great number of their people.

Despite this setback, the Qiang were nonetheless the main instigator of the Liang Province rebellion in 184, signalling the downfall of the Han dynasty. Unlike their previous rebellions, they allied themselves with the Chinese warlords in the northwest such as Ma Teng and Han Sui. Ma Teng himself was a half-Qiang through his mother, and he and his family had been living among the Qiang tribes. As the rebellion progressed, the Qiang seemed to have quietly withdrew from the conflict, allowing the local Han rebels to take the reins. In 211, the Qiang aided Ma Teng's son, Ma Chao in his war against Cao Cao, but were eventually brought under the latter's control after he conquered the region.

With northwestern China as a target of expansion for the Shu Han, one of the main objectives during the northern expeditions of Zhuge Liang and Jiang Wei was to win over the Qiang tribes living in Cao Wei territory. Jiang Wei's earlier expeditions saw Qiang chieftains like Ehe (餓何) and Shaoge (燒戈) rebelling in support of Shu Han, but they were all suppressed by Wei forces led by Guo Huai. The Qiang also fought as soldiers for both Cao Wei and Shu Han. After the fall of Shu Han, many of them later joined the Xianbei chieftain, Tufa Shujineng in his rebellion against the Western Jin dynasty from 270 to 280.

The Qiang continued to form a significant portion of the population in the northwest after the Three Kingdoms. During the Sixteen Kingdoms period, the Qiang founded the Later Qin dynasty (384–417).

=== Shanyue ===
The Shanyue "Mountain Yue" were a group of Austro-Asiatic people related to the Vietnamese who lived in the mountain regions of modern Jiangsu, Zhejiang, Anhui, Jiangxi and Fujian. In 203, they rebelled against Sun Quan's rule and were defeated by the generals Lü Fan, Cheng Pu, and Taishi Ci. In 217, Sun Quan appointed Lu Xun supreme commander of an army to suppress martial activities by the Shanyue in Guiji (modern Shaoxing). Captured Shanyue tribesmen were recruited into the army. In 234, Zhuge Ke was made governor of Danyang. Under his governorship, the region was cleansed of the Shanyue through systematic destruction of their settlements. Captured tribesmen were used as front line fodder in the army. The remaining population was resettled in lowlands and many became tenant farmers for Chinese landowners.

=== Vietnamese ===
During the early phase of the Three Kingdoms era, there was an unrest across the Jiaozhi circuit (modern-day Guangdong, Guangxi and northern Vietnam) led by the Wuhu chief Liang Long and his rebellion attracted the Lac Viet and all other ethnic groups in Southern Han China, but was suppressed in 184. After a century and a half of close imperial supervision and repression, Jiaozhi and Jiuzhen enjoyed a period of autonomy from 187 to 226. In 177 Shi Xie became the prefect of Jiaozhi (Jiaozhou (modern Vietnam and Guangzhou)), is primarily remembered today in Vietnam as Sĩ Nhiếp, the father of education and a great patron of Buddhism. He relocated Jiaozhi's capital back to Luy Lâu, the river market town Zhao Tuo had founded in 179 BC, which soon became celebrated for its trading prosperity. Shi Xie stayed out of the northern wars for the most part and later willingly submitted to Eastern Wu. According to Stephen O'Harrow, Shi Xie was essentially "the first Vietnamese." Buddhism became the predominant religion the Lac people. During Shi Xie's reign, the Lac people's customs had been slightly altered and sinicized by Xie.

The south's trade and treasure attracted imperial power. After Shi Xie's death in 226, the Wu court at Nanjing reasserted direct Chinese control over Jiaozhi. An army of three thousand set out from Nanhai Commandery and sailed up the Red River. The Wu general summoned Xie's son, Shi Hui, with his five brothers and sons, and beheaded them all. Having conquered Jiaozhi, Wu forces also stormed Jiuzhen, killing or capturing ten thousand people, along with surviving members of Shi Xie's family In 231, the Wu court had to send another general to Jiuzhen to “exterminate and pacify the barbarous Yuè” there. In 248, the people of Jiaozhi and Jiuzhen commanderies rebelled. A Lạc Việt woman named Lady Triệu in Jiuzhen led a rebellion, followed by a hundred Lac chieftains led fifty thousand families in her revolt. Eastern Wu sent Lu Yin to deal with the rebels. He defeated her and put her to death.

In 263, Viet "barbarians" people in Jiaozhi and Jiuzhen under Lã Hưng once again revolted against the Eastern Wu. The rebels handed the region over to Cao Wei (succeeded by the Jin dynasty in 266), which had recently conquered Shu Han. Wei sent former Shu officials and generals to govern the region, and in 268, they held off a large Wu counteroffensive. In 269, Wu launched another counteroffensive and eventually retook Jiaozhi's ports and main towns by 271.

=== Wuhuan ===
The Wuhuan, a people similar to the Xianbei, were a loose confederation of nomads that had been subservient to larger and stronger neighboring powers for most of their existence. In 168 the Wuhuan established some degree of independence under their own leaders. The largest of these groups were led by Nanlou in Shanggu, Qiuliju in Liaoxi, Supuyan in the Dependent State of Liaodong, and Wuyan in Youbeiping. In 187 Qiuliju joined the rebellion of Zhang Chun. Following the defeat of Zhang Chun in 188, Qiuliju attacked Gongsun Zan but was defeated. In 190 he surrendered to Liu Yu and died in 193. Qiuliju's son Louban was too young to succeed him so his cousin Tadun became acting guardian. In 195 Tadun, Nanlou and Supuyan supported Yuan Shao against Gongsun Zan. In 207, Tadun was defeated by Cao Cao at the Battle of White Wolf Mountain and died in battle. After their defeat many of the Wuhuan surrendered to Cao Cao and served as part of Cao Cao's cavalry forces. Louban and Supuyan fled to Gongsun Kang, who killed them.

Cao Cao divided the Wuhuan into three groups situated in Dai Commandery. The chieftains Nengchendi and Pufulu continued to cause trouble until 218 when Cao Zhang destroyed the last remnants of their power for good. The Wuhuan gradually lost their cultural identity as they assimilated with the Han Chinese, Xianbei and other surrounding ethnic groups. Nonetheless, they continued to appear in history up to the end of the 4th century, albeit their name had become a term for generic or miscellaneous hu (雜胡; zahu) tribes with Donghu backgrounds.

=== Wuqi ===
The Wuqi "Five Gorges" barbarians were a mountain people who lived in Wuling Commandery. In 221, Liu Bei bribed their leader Shamoke into supporting his war against Sun Quan, however the invasion failed and Shamoke was killed in a counterattack by Lu Xun the following year.

=== Xianbei ===
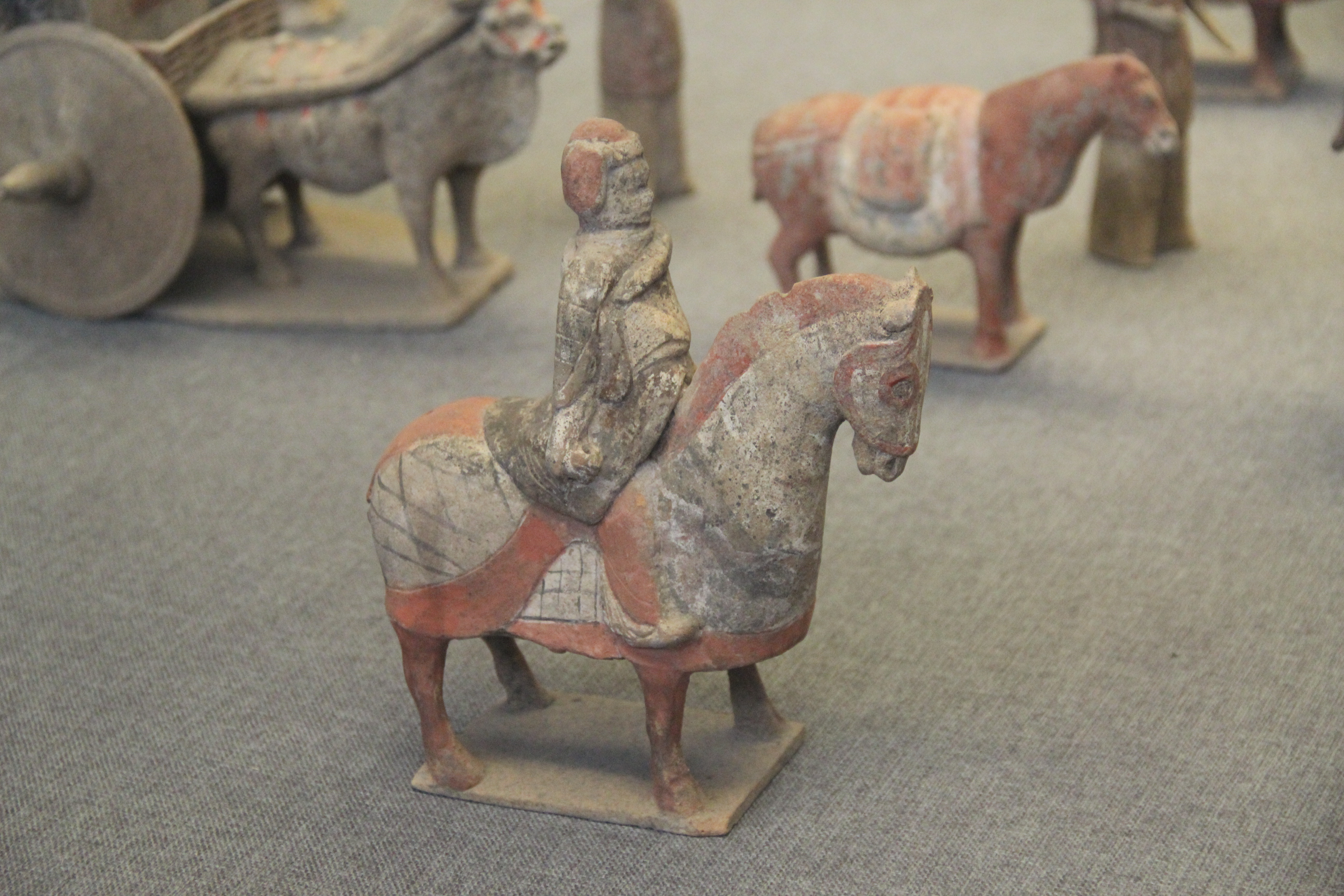
Xianbei cavalry

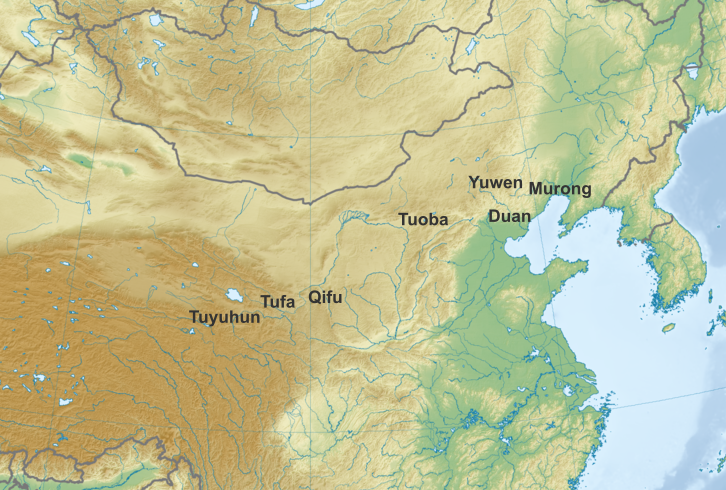
Distribution of major Xianbei clans in the early 4th century.

The Xianbei killed the Northern Xiongnu chanyu Youliu in 87 and rose to power in the wake of the Northern Chanyu's defeat by the Han at the Battle of the Altai Mountains in 89. By 156, the Xianbei were unified under a chieftain, Tanshihuai. Their loose confederacy lacked the organization of the Xiongnu but was highly aggressive until Tanshihuai's death in 181. Tanshihuai's son Helian lacked his father's abilities and was killed in a raid on Beidi near the end of Emperor Ling of Han's reign. Helian's brother Kuitou succeeded him, but when Helian's son Qianman came of age, he challenged his uncle to succession, destroying the last vestiges of unity among the Xianbei. By 190, the Xianbei had split into various groups, notably with Kuitou ruling in Inner Mongolia, Kebineng (軻比能) in northern Shanxi, and Suli (素利) and Mijia (彌加) in northern Liaodong.

In 205, Kuitou was succeeded by his brothers, Budugen and Fuluohan. Following Cao Cao's victory over the Wuhuan at the Battle of White Wolf Mountain in 207, Budugen, Fuluohan and many other Xianbei chieftains paid tribute to him. In 218, Fuluohan met with the Wuhuan chieftain Nengchendi (能臣氐) to form an alliance, but Nengchendi double crossed him and called in Kebineng, who killed Fuluohan. Budugen went to the court of Cao Wei in 224 to ask for assistance against Kebineng, but he eventually betrayed them and allied with Kebineng in 233. Kebineng killed Budugen soon afterwards.

Kebineng was from a minor Xianbei tribe. He rose to power west of Dai Commandery by taking in a number of Chinese refugees, who helped him drill his soldiers and make weapons. After the defeat of the Wuhuan in 207, he also sent tribute to Cao Cao, and even provided assistance against the rebel Tian Yin. In 218 he allied himself to the Wuhuan rebel Nengchendi but they were heavily defeated and forced back across the frontier by Cao Zhang. In 220 he acknowledged Cao Pi as emperor of Cao Wei. Eventually he turned on the Wei for frustrating his advances on another Xianbei chieftain, Suli. Kebineng conducted raids on Wei before he was killed in 235, after which his confederacy disintegrated.

The decline of the Wuhuan encouraged the Xianbei tribes to move inwards and fill in the power vacuum, with some even becoming vassals to the Wei and Jin courts. In 258, the Tuoba tribe settled in the abandoned city of Shengle, north of Shanxi. To the east of them, the Yuwen tribe settled between the Luan River and Liucheng, while the Murong tribe were allowed to move deeper into Liaodong after they assisted Sima Yi in his campaign against Gongsun Yuan in 238. Unlike the Xianbei of the steppe, the Duan was founded within the Chinese border by a Xianbei ex-slave of the Wuhuan, and rose to prominence in Liaoxi.

Other Xianbei tribes opted to migrate westward and settled around the Hexi Corridor. An offshoot of the Murong tribe moved into northern Qinghai and mixed with the native Qiang people, becoming known as the Tuyuhun, while the Qifu tribe settled around the Yellow River in the Longxi basin. A branch of the Tuoba, the Tufa tribe roamed the Hexi Corridor, and in 270, their chieftain, Tufa Shujineng, led a rebellion against the Jin dynasty with the Xianbei, Qiang, and other tribal peoples living in northwestern China. The rebels killed a handful of the generals sent to defeat them, and in 279, they were even able to capture Liang province. That year, Jin sent the general, Ma Long and finally quelled the rebellion in 280.

The Xianbei that migrated into China during this period went on to play an important role in Chinese history. They founded five of the short lived Sixteen Kingdoms: Former Yan (337–370), Later Yan (384–409), Western Qin (385–431), Southern Liang (397–414), and Southern Yan (398–410). They also established the Northern Wei (386–535), and the subsequent Northern Dynasties were all either founded by the Xianbei or heavily influenced by them.

=== Xiongnu ===
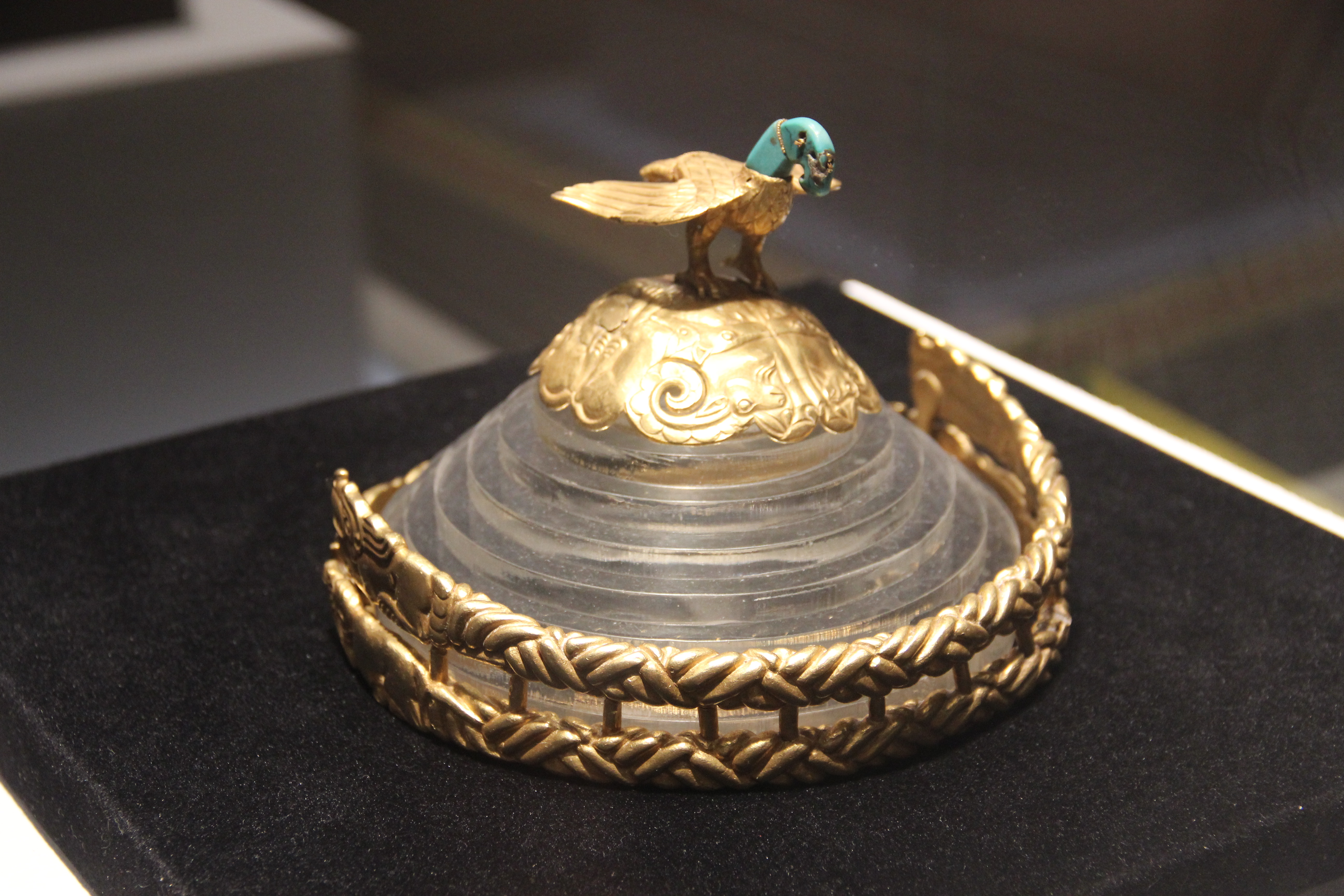
Xiongnu crown, Warring States period

==== Southern Xiongnu ====
By the time of the Three Kingdoms period the Xiongnu had already ceased to be a major power. Due to infighting, the Xiongnu empire was divided into north and south in the 1st century; the northern branch, known as the Northern Xiongnu, had their last stand as a steppe empire in 89 when Dou Xian led an army of 45,000 and decisively defeated them at the Battle of the Altai Mountains. The southern branch, known as the Southern Xiongnu, continued to exist as a Han puppet state in Bing Province, where they served as auxiliaries to defend the frontiers. The Xiongnu Empire of the steppe was replaced by a loose confederation of disorganized Xianbei tribes, who were nonetheless highly aggressive and proved problematic to their southern neighbors.

In 188, just as the situation in Luoyang was about to boil over, the Southern Xiongnu were also experiencing their own power struggle. The chanyu Qiangqu had been sending his tribesmen to aid the Han against the Yellow Turbans and Zhang Chun, and many among the Southern Xiongnu were alarmed by how frequent they were being mobilized. At the same time, another vassal people known as the Xiuchuge had rebelled against the Han in the Hetao region, invading Xihe Commandery and killing the Inspector of Bing. Seizing the opportunity, Southern Xiongnu rebels, led by the Xiluo clan of the Right Division, allied with the Xiuchuge and also had Qiangqu killed. When the Han court appointed his son Yufuluo to succeed him, the rebels refused to acknowledge his rule by expelling him and installing a marquis of the Xubu clan. However, after the marquis's death just a year later, his followers decided to retire the chanyu position and installed an elderly king as the nominal head of state.

Yufuluo fled to the Han court but found no support after the death of Emperor Ling of Han in 189. When Yufuluo returned to Bing, he was denied entry by the rebels, so he acted as a wandering mercenary around Hedong Commandery, east of the Fen River while still claiming the title of chanyu. After he died in 195, his brother, Huchuquan succeeded him. Around this time, their uncle, Qubei notably provided military support for Emperor Xian of Han in his escape from Chang'an to Luoyang, and later escorted him to Cao Cao at Xuchang in 196. Huchuquan came to serve under Yuan Shang in 202 but was defeated by Cao Cao's officer Zhong Yao, after which he surrendered to Cao Cao. In 206, Cao Cao appointed Liang Xi as the Inspector of Bing province. By that point, the Xiongnu tribes were throughly scattered throughout the province and were rebellious. Liang Xi was able to pacify a number of these tribes and turned them into registered households, restoring order to the Shanxi area. However, the western portion of Bing in the Ordos Plateau remained lost and were eventually abandoned by Cao Cao.

==== Five Divisions ====
In 216, Cao Cao detained Huchuquan at Ye as an honoured prisoner while sending Qubei to supervise the tribes back in his home. Around this time, it was recorded that Cao Cao had the remaining Xiongnu forces divided into the Five Divisions (Left, Right, South, North and Centre) and settled them around Taiyuan Commandery. The nominal title of chanyu remained with Huchuquan until his death, after which no new chanyu was proclaimed. During his tenure, Qubei clashed with the migrating Tuoba-Xianbei people in the north and rendered "meritorious service" to the Cao Wei. After his death, his sons were not allowed to inherit his position.

During the Jiaping era (249–254), the Commander of the Left Division, Liu Bao united the Five Divisions and began building up his military force. The Wei general, Deng Ai brought the matter to the court, who gradually redivided Liu Bao's forces into five and had him send his son, Liu Yuan, as a hostage in Luoyang. Qubei's son, Liu Meng was also given an honorary title among the Five Divisions and was stationed at Yanmen Pass. However, in 271, Liu Meng rebelled and left the Great Wall. He later returned to invade Bing, but was swiftly defeated and killed in early 272.

During the Sixteen Kingdoms period, Liu Yuan founded the Han-Zhao dynasty (304–329), while a line of Qubei's descendants, the Tiefu clan, founded the Helian Xia dynasty (407–431). Shi Le, the founder of the Jie-led Later Zhao dynasty (319–351), descended from one of the Southern Xiongnu tribes, the Qiangqu (羌渠).

=== Xiuchuge ===
The Xiuchuge, also known as the Xiutu or Chuge, were a tribal ethnic group and vassal of the Han dynasty. While traditional history states that they were a Southern Xiongnu tribe, modern research suggests that they were likely a separate entity. The Xiuchuge are generally believed to have originated from the people of King Xiutu, a Xiongnu vassal king from Gansu who surrendered to Han in the 2nd century BC.

In 188, the Chuge people of Bing province rebelled against the Han and invaded Xihe Commandery, where they killed the provincial inspector. With the support of the Southern Xiongnu, their forces also killed the southern chanyu, Qiangqu. In 193, the Bingzhou Chuge allied with the Heishan bandits of the Taihang Mountains, fighting against Yuan Shao before eventually surrendering in 199. They were employed as auxiliaries by Yuan Shao's family, but later entered Cao Cao's service as he unified northern China. The Chuge became a powerful group among the Five Divisions, so much so that their identity eclipsed the Xiongnu in prominence. Recent theories propose that Liu Bao, who was described in records as the son of Yufuluo, was actually a chieftain of the Chuge.

Other branches of the Chuge and Xiutu were also present in northwestern China. In 214, Xiahou Yuan attacked a group of Chuge tribe at Gaoping County (高平縣; present-day Guyuan, Ningxia) and scattered them. In 240, a Xiutu chieftain, Liang Yuanbi (梁元碧) brought his people from Liang province to surrender to Cao Wei and was relocated to Gaoping.

== Campaigns and battles ==
=== 184–220 ===
Campaigns and battles at the end of the Han dynasty
Year	Battle	Belligerents		Forces involved		Victor
Year	Battle	Aggressor	Defender	Aggressor	Defender	Victor
190	Battle of Xingyang (190)	Cao Cao	Xu Rong (Dong Zhuo)	3,000		Inconclusive
191	Battle of Yangcheng	Zhou Yu (Renming) (Yuan Shao)	Sun Jian (Yuan Shu)			Sun Jian (Yuan Shu)
191	Battle of Jieqiao	Gongsun Zan	Yuan Shao	40,000	40,000	Yuan Shao
191	Battle of Xiangyang (191)	Sun Jian (Yuan Shu)	Huang Zu (Liu Biao)			Huang Zu (Liu Biao)
193	Battle of Fengqiu	Cao Cao	Yuan Shu			Cao Cao
193-194	Cao Cao's invasion of Xu Province	Cao Cao	Tao Qian		5,000	Cao Cao
194-195	Battle of Yan Province	Lü Bu	Cao Cao	10,000		Cao Cao
194-199	Sun Ce's conquests in Jiangdong	Sun Ce	Various warlords (Liu Yao, Yan Baihu, Xu Gong, Wang Lang, Lu Kang, Lu Xun)			Sun Ce
197-199	War between Cao Cao and Zhang Xiu	Cao Cao	Zhang Xiu			Cao Cao
198-199	Battle of Xiapi	Lü Bu	Cao Cao			Cao Cao
198-199	Battle of Yijing	Yuan Shao	Gongsun Zan	107,000	100,000	Yuan Shao
200	Battle of Guandu	Yuan Shao	Cao Cao	110,000	20,000	Cao Cao
202	Battle of Bowang	Xiahou Dun (Cao Cao)	Liu Bei			Liu Bei
202-203	Battle of Liyang	Cao Cao	Yuan Shang			Inconclusive
203	Battle of Xiakou	Ling Cao (Sun Quan)	Huang Zu (Liu Biao)			Inconclusive
204	Battle of Ye	Cao Cao	Yuan Shang			Cao Cao
205	Battle of Nanpi	Cao Cao	Yuan Tan			Cao Cao
207	Battle of White Wolf Mountain	Cao Cao	Tadun			Cao Cao
208	Battle of Jiangxia	Zhou Yu (Sun Quan)	Huang Zu (Liu Biao)	25,000	30,000	Zhou Yu (Sun Quan)
208	Battle of Changban	Cao Cao	Liu Bei			Cao Cao
208	Battle of Red Cliffs	Cao Cao	Liu Bei, Zhou Yu (Sun Quan)	220,000	50,000	Liu Bei, Zhou Yu (Sun Quan)
208-209	Battle of Hefei (208)	Sun Quan	Liu Fu (Cao Cao)			Inconclusive
211	Battle of Tong Pass (211)	Cao Cao	Ma Chao	60,000	100,000	Cao Cao
212-214	Liu Bei's takeover of Yi Province	Liu Bei	Liu Zhang	30,000	30,000	Liu Bei
213	Siege of Jicheng	Ma Chao	Wei Kang (Cao Cao)	10,000	1,000	Ma Chao
213	Battle of Lucheng	Yang Fu	Ma Chao			Yang Fu
213	Battle of Ruxu (213)	Cao Cao	Sun Quan	400,000	70,000	Sun Quan
214	Battle of Qi Mountains	Xiahou Yuan (Cao Cao)	Zhang Lu			Xiahou Yuan (Cao Cao)
214-215	Battle of Xiaoyao Ford	Sun Quan	Zhang Liao (Cao Cao)	100,000	7,000	Zhang Liao (Cao Cao)
215	Battle of Baxi	Zhang He (Cao Cao)	Zhang Fei (Liu Bei)			Zhang Fei (Liu Bei)
215-216	Battle of Yangping	Cao Cao	Zhang Lu			Cao Cao
217	Battle of Ruxu (217)	Cao Cao	Sun Quan	400,000	73,000	Sun Quan
218-219	Battle of Mount Dingjun	Liu Bei	Xiahou Yuan (Cao Cao)			Liu Bei
219	Battle of Han River	Cao Cao	Zhao Yun (Liu Bei)	40,000	10,000	Zhao Yun (Liu Bei)
219	Battle of Fancheng	Guan Yu (Liu Bei)	Cao Ren (Cao Cao)	70,000	100,000	Cao Ren (Cao Cao)

=== 220–280 ===
Campaigns and battles of the Three Kingdoms
Year	Battle	Belligerents		Forces involved		Victor
Year	Battle	Aggressor	Defender	Aggressor	Defender	Victor
219-220	Lü Meng's invasion of Jing Province	Lü Meng (Sun Quan)	Guan Yu (Liu Bei)			Lü Meng (Sun Quan)
221-222	Battle of Xiaoting	Liu Bei	Lu Xun	40,000	50,000	Lu Xun
222	Battle of Dongkou	Cao Xiu	Lü Fan			Inconclusive
222-223	Battle of Ruxu (222–223)	Cao Ren	Zhu Huan			Zhu Huan
223	Battle of Jiangling (223)	Cao Zhen	Zhu Ran		5,000	Inconclusive
223	Battle of Qichun	He Qi	Jin Zong			He Qi
225	Zhuge Liang's Southern Campaign	Zhuge Liang	Various tribal rebels (Yong Kai, Zhu Bao, Gao Ding, Meng Huo)			Zhuge Liang
227-228	Xincheng Rebellion	Meng Da	Sima Yi			Sima Yi
228	Tianshui revolts	Zhuge Liang	Cao Zhen	60,000	50,000	Inconclusive
228	Battle of Jieting	Zhang He	Ma Su			Zhang He
228	Battle of Shiting	Lu Xun	Cao Xiu			Lu Xun
229	Siege of Chencang	Zhuge Liang	Hao Zhao	40,000	1,000	Hao Zhao
229	Battle of Jianwei	Zhuge Liang	Guo Huai			Zhuge Liang
231	Battle of Mount Qi	Zhuge Liang	Sima Yi			Stalemate
231	Battle of Hefei (231)	Sun Quan	Man Chong			Man Chong
233	Battle of Hefei (233)	Sun Quan	Man Chong			Inconclusive
234	Battle of Wuzhang Plains	Zhuge Liang	Sima Yi	60,000		Inconclusive
234	Battle of Hefei (234)	Sun Quan	Man Chong			Man Chong
238	Sima Yi's Liaodong campaign	Sima Yi	Gongsun Yuan	40,000	50,000	Sima Yi
240	Jiang Wei's Northern Expeditions (1)	Jiang Wei	Guo Huai			Guo Huai
241	Quebei Campaign	Sun Quan	Sima Yi			Sima Yi
244	Battle of Xingshi	Cao Shuang	Fei Yi	60,000	30,000	Fei Yi
244-245	Goguryeo–Wei War	Guanqiu Jian	Dongcheon of Goguryeo	6,000	8,000	Guanqiu Jian
247	Jiang Wei's Northern Expeditions (2)	Jiang Wei	Guo Huai			Guo Huai
248	Jiang Wei's Northern Expeditions (3)	Jiang Wei	Guo Huai			Inconclusive
249	Jiang Wei's Northern Expeditions (4)	Jiang Wei	Guo Huai			Guo Huai
250	Jiang Wei's Northern Expeditions (5)	Jiang Wei	Cao Wei			Cao Wei
251	Wang Ling's Rebellion	Wang Ling	Sima Yi			Sima Yi
253	Battle of Dongxing	Ding Feng	Sima Zhao			Ding Feng
253	Battle of Hefei (253)	Zhuge Ke	Zhang Te			Zhang Te
253	Jiang Wei's Northern Expeditions (6)	Jiang Wei	Chen Tai			Chen Tai
254	Jiang Wei's Northern Expeditions (7)	Jiang Wei	Xu Zhi			Jiang Wei
255	Battle of Didao	Jiang Wei	Chen Tai			Chen Tai
255	Guanqiu Jian and Wen Qin's Rebellion	Guanqiu Jian	Sima Shi			Sima Shi
256	Jiang Wei's Northern Expeditions (9)	Jiang Wei	Deng Ai			Deng Ai
257-258	Zhuge Dan's Rebellion	Zhuge Dan	Sima Zhao	170,000	260,000	Sima Zhao
257-258	Jiang Wei's Northern Expeditions (10)	Jiang Wei	Sima Wang			Inconclusive
262	Jiang Wei's Northern Expeditions (11)	Jiang Wei	Deng Ai			Deng Ai
263-271	Jiao Province Campaign	Huo Yi	Tao Huang			Tao Huang
263	Conquest of Shu by Wei	Sima Zhao	Liu Shan	160,000	90,000	Sima Zhao
264	Siege of Yong'an	Bu Xie	Luo Xian			Luo Xian
270-280	Tufa Shujineng's Rebellion	Tufa Shujineng	Ma Long			Ma Long
272-273	Battle of Xiling	Yang Hu	Lu Kang			Lu Kang
279-280	Conquest of Wu by Jin	Wang Jun	Sun Hao	200,000	230,000	Wang Jun

== Bibliography ==
- Barnes, Gina L. (2001), State Formation in Korea: Historical and Archaeological Perspectives, Routledge
- Dien, Albert (1981), A Study of Early Chinese Armor
- Barfield, Thomas (1989), The Perilous Frontier: Nomadic Empires and China, Basil Blackwell
- Besio, Kimberly (2007), Three Kingdoms and Chinese Culture | State University of New York Press
- de Crespigny, Rafe (1984), Northern Frontier: The Policies and Strategy of the Later Han Empire, Canberra: The Australian National University, Faculty of Asian Studies, hdl:1885/148890, ISBN 978-0-86784-410-8
- de Crespigny, Rafe (1990), Generals of the South
- de Crespigny, Rafe (2004), Generals of the South
- de Crespigny, Rafe (2004b), Generals of the South 2
- de Crespigny, Rafe (2007), A Biographical Dictionary of Later Han to the Three Kingdoms, Brill
- de Crespigny, Rafe (2010), Imperial Warlord, Brill
- de Crespigny, Rafe (2017), Fire Over Luoyang: A History of the Later Han Dynasty, 23-220 AD, Brill
- di Cosmo, Nicola (2009), Military Culture in Imperial China, Harvard University Press
- Graff, David A. (2002), Medieval Chinese Warfare, 300-900, Routledge
- Graff, David A. (2016), The Eurasian Way of War: Military practice in seventh-century China and Byzantium, Routledge
- Lee, Peter H. (1992), Sourcebook of Korean Civilization 1, Columbia University Press
- Liang, Jieming (2006), Chinese Siege Warfare: Mechanical Artillery & Siege Weapons of Antiquity, Singapore, Republic of Singapore: Leong Kit Meng, ISBN 981-05-5380-3
- Lorge, Peter A. (2011), Chinese Martial Arts: From Antiquity to the Twenty-First Century, Cambridge: Cambridge University Press, ISBN 978-0-521-87881-4
- Lorge, Peter (2015), The Reunification of China: Peace through War under the Song Dynasty, Cambridge University Press
- Peers, C.J. (1990), Ancient Chinese Armies: 1500-200BC, Osprey Publishing
- Peers, C.J. (1992), Medieval Chinese Armies: 1260-1520, Osprey Publishing
- Peers, C.J. (1995), Imperial Chinese Armies (1): 200BC-AD589, Osprey Publishing
- Peers, C.J. (1996), Imperial Chinese Armies (2): 590-1260AD, Osprey Publishing
- Peers, C.J. (2006), Soldiers of the Dragon: Chinese Armies 1500 BC - AD 1840, Osprey Publishing Ltd
- Peers, Chris (2013), Battles of Ancient China, Pen & Sword Military
- Shin, Michael D. (2014), Korean History in Maps, Cambridge University Press
- Taylor, Keith Weller (1983), The Birth of the Vietnam, University of California Press, ISBN 9780520074170
- Taylor, K.W. (2013), A History of the Vietnamese, Cambridge University Press
- Kiernan, Ben (2019), Việt Nam: a history from earliest time to the present, Oxford University Press, ISBN 9780521875868
- Li, Tana; Anderson, James A. (2011), The Tongking Gulf Through History, University of Pennsylvania Press, Incorporated, ISBN 9780812205022
- Wagner, Donald B. (2008), Science and Civilization in China Volume 5-11: Ferrous Metallurgy, Cambridge University Press
- Lü, Simian (2005), A History of Jin, Northern and Southern Dynasties, Shanghai Classics Publishing House, ISBN 9787532540686
- Chen Yong (2007), The Failure of the Superintendence of Qubei and the Rise of Liu Bao of the Chuge
- Zhou, Yiliang (1997), Ethnic Issues and Ethnic Policies of the Northern Dynasties
- Tang, Changru (2010), Examination of Miscellaneous Barbarians in the Wei and Jin Dynasties
- Coedès, George (1968), F. Vella, Walter (ed.), The Indianized States of Southeast Asia, translated by Brown Cowing, Susan, University of Hawaii Press, ISBN 978-0-824-80368-1

== Sources ==
- Sanguozhi
- Zizhi Tongjian
- Weilüe

== See also ==
- Military history of China (pre-1911)
