= Sun Jian =

Late Han dynasty general and warlord (155-191)

- 孫堅
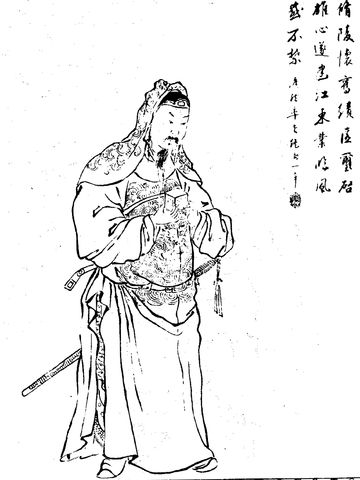
- A Qing dynasty illustration of Sun Jian

General Who Destroys Barbarians (破虜將軍) (under Yuan Shu)
- In office 190 – 191
- Monarch: Emperor Xian of Han

Inspector of Yu Province (豫州刺史) (under Yuan Shu)
- In office 190 – 191
- Monarch: Emperor Xian of Han
- Preceded by: Kong Zhou

Administrator of Changsha (長沙太守)
- In office 187 – 190
- Monarchs: Emperor Ling of Han; Emperor Xian of Han

Personal details
- Born: 155 Fuchun County, Wu Commandery (around modern day Fuyang District, Hangzhou, Zhejiang)
- Died: 191 (aged 36) (Note: The Wu Lu recorded that Sun Jian was 37 years old (by East Asian age reckoning) when he died in 191.) Xiangyang
- Spouse: Empress Wulie Lady Chen
- Children: Sun Ce, Prince Huan of Changsha Sun Quan, Emperor Da of Wu Sun Yi Sun Kuang Lady Sun Sun Lang Pan Mi's wife Hong Zi's wife at least one other daughter
- Parent: Sun Zhong (father)
- Relatives: See Eastern Wu family trees
- Occupation: Military general, politician, warlord

Military service
- Allegiance: Han Empire; Guandong Coalition; Yuan Shu's forces
- Unit: Sun Jian's forces
- Battles/wars: Xu Chang's rebellion Yellow Turban Rebellion; Liang Province Rebellion; Campaign against Dong Zhuo; Battle of Xiangyang
Names
- Family name: Sun (孫); Given name: Jian (堅); Courtesy name: Wentai (文臺)
Posthumous name
- Emperor Wulie (武烈皇帝)
Temple name
- Shizu (始祖)

Sun Jian (Chinese: 孫堅; pinyin: Sūn Jiān) (155–191? (Note: There are discrepancies over Sun Jian's death date. See this section.)), courtesy name Wentai, was a Chinese military general, politician, and warlord who lived during the late Eastern Han dynasty of China. He allied himself with Yuan Shu in 190 when warlords from eastern China formed a coalition to oust Dong Zhuo, a tyrannical warlord who held the puppet Emperor Xian of Han in his power. Although he controlled neither many troops nor much land, Sun Jian's personal bravery and resourcefulness were feared by Dong Zhuo, who placed him among Yuan Shao, Yuan Shu and Liu Biao as the most influential men at that time. After the coalition disbanded in the next year, China fell into civil war. In 191, Sun Jian was killed in battle during an offensive campaign against Liu Biao.

Sun Jian was the father of Sun Quan, one of the central figures of the Three Kingdoms era who eventually established the Eastern Wu dynasty in 222. Sun Jian was given the posthumous name Emperor Wulie (武烈皇帝) and the temple name Shizu (始祖).

== Early life and career ==
Sun Jian was born in Fuchun County (富春縣), Wu Commandery, around present day Fuyang, Zhejiang. He was allegedly a descendant of Sun Tzu, the author of The Art of War. No more immediate records survive, indicating his family probably played a very small part during the Han dynasty. Even his father's name is unrecorded, although a folk tradition gives it as Sun Zhong (孫鍾). Sun Jiang had an elder twin brother, Sun Qiang (孫羌).

Sun Jian was a civil official in his home county during his youth. When he was 16, Sun Jian travelled with his father to Qiantang, where they encountered a band of pirates dividing up their spoils on land. Sun Jian jumped on shore with a sabre in hand and pointed in different directions as if commanding a detachment of soldiers to surround the pirates. Seeing this, the pirates were deceived and fled. Sun Jian pursued, and only after beheading one pirate did he return. His name henceforth spread.

In 172, he became acting major for the pro-government militias which fought against Xu Chang's rebellion in Kuaiji Commandery. He raised a militia of about 1,000 men and served with distinction, whereupon he was recommended to the court by Yang Province Inspector Zang Min (臧旻). Sun Jian was consequently rewarded with a post as assistant magistrate in Guangling Commandery, and later in two counties in Xiapi. This allowed him to gather many followers.

In 184, the Yellow Turban Rebellion led by Zhang Jiao broke out across the country. Sun Jian joined the general Zhu Jun (Note: During Xu Chang's rebellion, Zhu was serving as a registrar under Yin Duan, then Administrator of Kuaiji. Thus, it is possible that Sun and Zhu became acquainted back then.) to quell the rebellion in Yu Province (covering roughly present-day southern Henan and northern Anhui). The soldiers fought hard, forcing the rebels to retreat to Wan (宛; present-day Wancheng District, Nanyang, Henan). Sun Jian placed himself in the forefront and climbed onto the city walls alone. The rest then swarmed in and defeated the rebels.

Around this time, Bian Zhang and Han Sui colluded with the Qiang tribes and rebelled in Liang Province (涼州; present-day western Gansu). After Dong Zhuo failed to put down the rebellion, the central government sent in his place the Minister of Works Zhang Wen, who invited Sun Jian along as an adviser. When Zhang Wen summoned Dong Zhuo to the encampment at Chang'an, Dong Zhuo procrastinated and took a long time to arrive. When he did, he showed little respect for Zhang Wen. Sun Jian then advised Zhang Wen to execute Dong Zhuo, but Zhang Wen declined as Dong Zhuo held high reputation in the west.

Despite scoring a major victory against the rebels at Meiyang, Zhang Wen could not press their advantage and the rebellion was still not quelled. Zhang Wen and the rest returned to the capital Luoyang in disgrace and thus no honor was accorded. Meanwhile, another local-scale rebellion broke out near Changsha Commandery and the rebels besieged the city. Sun Jian was then appointed as the Administrator of Changsha Commandery in c.December 187. Within a month of taking office, Sun Jian had quelled the rebellion. Meanwhile, rebellions also broke out in the neighbouring commanderies of Lingling (零陵; around present-day Yongzhou, Hunan) and Guiyang (桂陽; around present-day Guiyang County, Hunan). Sun Jian defeated the rebel leaders Ou Xing (區星), Zhou Chao (周朝) and Guo Shi (郭石), and suppressed both rebellions. The Han imperial court enfeoffed him as the Marquis of Wucheng (烏程侯) in recognition of his contributions.

== Coalition against Dong Zhuo ==
In 189, Emperor Ling died, leaving his young son in the care of Empress Dowager He and General-in-Chief He Jin. He Jin then summoned Dong Zhuo to lead troops into the capital to assist in a plot to eliminate the powerful eunuch faction. Before Dong Zhuo arrived, however, He Jin was assassinated by the eunuchs and Luoyang fell into chaos following a clash between supporters of both sides. Dong Zhuo then seized military control of the capital and deposed the young emperor for the puppet Emperor Xian. However, his tyrannical ways incurred the wrath of many and in the following year, warlords from eastern China formed a coalition against him.

Sun Jian also raised an army and joined Yuan Shu, one of the leaders of the coalition at Luyang (魯陽; present-day Lushan County, Henan). On his way, he killed Inspector of Jing Province Wang Rui and Administrator of Nanyang Zhang Zi. Yuan Shu appointed Sun Jian as General Who Destroys Barbarians (破虜將軍, also translated as "General Who Smashes the Caitiffs") and Inspector of Yu Province (豫州刺史). Sun Jian then began training and preparing his troops at Luyang. A force sent by Dong Zhuo was so impressed with the strict discipline of Sun Jian's troops that they gave up the plan to attack Luyang. When Sun Jian moved out to Liangdong (梁東; east of present-day Linru County, Henan), he was outnumbered by Dong Zhuo's forces, led by Xu Rong. With several dozen horsemen, Sun Jian broke out of the encirclement. He took off the red felt scarf he had always been wearing and handed it to his trusted aide Zu Mao (祖茂), whom Dong Zhuo's soldiers then chased after while Sun Jian escaped. Unable to shake off his pursuers, Zu Mao then dismounted, hung the scarf onto a half-burnt pillar, and hid himself in the tall grass nearby. The enemies surrounded the pillar and approached cautiously till they realised they had been fooled, whereupon they retreated.

After regrouping his troops, Sun Jian pressed his troops towards Luoyang and engaged in battle against Dong Zhuo's forces at Yangren (陽人; believed to be near present-day Wenquan, Ruzhou, Henan). He scored a brilliant victory and killed the enemy commander Hua Xiong in battle (c.April 191). At this time, someone told Yuan Shu that if Sun Jian defeated Dong Zhuo and took over Luoyang, he would no longer submit to anyone. Feeling doubtful, Yuan Shu stopped providing food supplies to Sun Jian's army. Sun Jian rode the hundred odd li from Yangren to Luyang overnight to see Yuan Shu, whereupon he told the latter, "I put myself in danger during battle, firstly to eliminate the villain (Dong Zhuo) for the Han Empire, and secondly to avenge the deaths of your family members. I have no personal grudge against Dong Zhuo. Yet you believe slanderous talks and suspect me!" The words put Yuan Shu to shame and he immediately ordered his men to continue delivering food supplies to Sun Jian's army.

Fearing Sun Jian, Dong Zhuo then sent his general Li Jue as an emissary to seek peace and propose a marriage to cement the alliance. However, Sun Jian rejected the proposals with harsh words and continued to lead his troops towards Luoyang. In late 190, his army was merely 90 li away from the capital when Dong Zhuo retreated west to Chang'an after ordering the destruction of Luoyang by fire. Entering the ruins of Luoyang, Sun Jian ordered his men to reseal the tombs of Han emperors that were excavated by Dong Zhuo, after which he returned to Luyang. (Note: Vol.60 of Zizhi Tongjian dated Sun's return to Luyang to just before the 4th month of the 2nd year of the Chuping era (12 May to 9 Jun 191 in the Julian calendar).) It was said in the Book of Wu (吳書) by Wei Zhao that Sun Jian found one of the emperor's jade seals in a well south of Luoyang and kept it. Later, when Yuan Shu declared himself emperor, he held Sun Jian's wife Lady Wu hostage in exchange for the seal.

== Later life ==
In 191, Yuan Shu sent Sun Jian to attack Liu Biao, the Governor of Jing Province (荆州; covering present-day Hubei and Hunan). He defeated Liu Biao's forces led by Huang Zu and pursued the enemy across the Han River to Xiangyang. While he was travelling alone through Xianshan (峴山), Huang Zu's troops ambushed him and shot him to death with arrows. The Record of Heroes (英雄記) by Wang Can, however, claims that Sun Jian died in 193 and that he was crushed to death by boulders while pursuing the enemy commander Lü Gong (呂公). Sun Jian's nephew, Sun Ben, gathered his uncle's troops and returned to Yuan Shu, who then appointed him as the Inspector of Yu Province to replace his uncle.

Sun Jian was buried in the Gao Mausoleum in Qu'e (曲阿; in present-day Danyang, Jiangsu). He was survived by at least five sons and three daughters. His eldest son, Sun Ce, became a warlord and conquered several territories in the Jiangdong region. Like his father, Sun Ce died at a relatively young age and was succeeded by his younger brother, Sun Quan. Sun Quan built on his brother's legacy and eventually established the state of Eastern Wu in 229, with himself as its founding emperor, during the Three Kingdoms period. Lady Sun later married the warlord and founder of the state of Shu Han, Liu Bei, in an attempt to forge an alliance to defeat Cao Cao after the Battle of Red Cliff. After ascending the throne, Sun Quan honoured his father with the posthumous title "Emperor Wulie" (武烈皇帝).

== Historical discrepancies on death date ==
There are multiple differing accounts on Sun Jian's death date.

=== Death in 191 ===
A Wu Lu annotation in Sun Ce's biography in Sanguozhi recorded that Sun Ce stated in a memorial to the imperial court (Note: This memorial was sent in reply to Cao Cao appointing him General Who Attacks Rebels (討逆將軍) and ennobling him as the Marquis of Wu (呉侯).) that he was 17 (by East Asian reckoning) when his father died. In this account, since Sun Ce died in 200 at the age of 26 (by East Asian reckoning), Sun Jian should have died in 191. (Note: The 2nd year of the Chuping era ends on 31 Jan 192 in the Julian calendar.)

=== Death in 192 ===
Sun Jian's biography in Sanguozhi recorded that he was sent by Yuan Shu to attack Jing province in the 3rd year of the Chuping era of Liu Xie's reign. This account was also found in Book of the Later Han (volume 09) and Annals of the Later Han (compiled by Yuan Hong; volume 27). Pei Songzhi in his commentary found in Sun Ce's biography of Sanguozhi noted that Sun Jian dying in 192 as recorded in his Sanguozhi biography should be an error, noting that Zhang Fan's Annals of Han and the Wu Li both recorded that Sun Jian died in 191. Sima Guang, in his Zizhi Tongjian Kao Yi, agreed that Sun Jian died in 191.

=== Death in 193 ===
Wang Can's Records of Heroes recorded that Sun Jian died on the 7th day of the 1st month of the 4th year of the Chuping era. This corresponds to 25 February 193 in the Julian calendar.

== Family ==
=== Family tree ===
==== Sun Jian ====
Lady Chen 陳氏	Sun Jian 孫堅; Wentai 文台	Lady Wu 吳氏	Wu Jing 吳景
Pan Jun 潘濬; Chengming 承明	Sun Lang 孫朗; Zao'an 早安	Sun Ce 孫策; Bofu 伯符	Sun Quan 孫權; Zhongmou 仲謀	Sun Yi 孫翊; Shubi 叔弼	Sun Kuang 孫匡; Jizuo 季佐
Pan Mi 潘祕	Daughter (name unknown)	Daughter (name unknown)	Hong Zi 弘咨	Liu Bei 劉備; Xuande 玄德	Lady Sun 孫仁

Four of Sun Jian's sons – Sun Ce, Sun Quan, Sun Yi and Sun Kuang – and one of his daughters (her identity is unrecorded) were born to his wife Lady Wu, who was Wu Jing's elder sister. Lady Sun married Liu Bei.

=== Father ===
- Sun Zhong is the father of Sun Jian, grandfather of Sun Quan. Living with his mother, he believed in filial piety and grew melons as a career. (Note: Chronologically, probably the earliest record of Sun Zhong was found in the Book of Song (compiled late 5th century) by Shen Yue. However, in the Book of Song, Sun Zhong was recorded as Sun Jian's grandfather.)

=== Brothers ===
- Sun Jing
- Sun Qiang

=== Sisters ===
- Lady Sun (Sun Jian's sister), a younger sister who was Xu Kun's mother (and thus Lady Xu's grandmother)

=== Children ===
- Sun Ce, eldest son, warlord in Jiangdong.
- Sun Quan, second son, Emperor Da of Wu
- Sun Yi, third son.
- Sun Kuang, fourth son.
- Lady Sun, the wife of Emperor Zhaolie Liu Bei.
- Sun Lang, (Note: Sun Lang's birth order is unknown) later disowned by Sun Quan.
- Hong Zi's wife, who is older than Sun Quan (Note: Zhuge Jin's biography in Sanguozhi uses the term "Sun Quan's zixu" (孫權姊壻) to describe Hong Zi.)
- Pan Mi's wife

=== Grandchildren ===
- Sun Shao, posthumous son of Sun Ce.
- Sun Deng, was an imperial prince of the state of Eastern Wu during the Three Kingdoms period of China. He was the eldest son of Sun Quan.
- Sun Lü, as a noble and military general of the state of Eastern Wu in the Three Kingdoms period of China. He was the second son of Sun Quan, the founding emperor of Eastern Wu.
- Sun He, as an imperial prince of the state of Eastern Wu during the Three Kingdoms period of China. He was the third son of Sun Quan, the founding emperor of Wu.
- Sun Ba, was an imperial prince of the state of Eastern Wu during the Three Kingdoms period of China. He was the fourth son of Sun Quan, the founding emperor of Eastern Wu.
- Sun Fen, was an imperial prince of the state of Eastern Wu during the Three Kingdoms period of China. He was the fifth son of Sun Quan, the founding emperor of Eastern Wu.
- Sun Liang, was the second emperor of the state of Eastern Wu during the Three Kingdoms period of China. He was the youngest son and heir of Sun Quan.
- Sun Luban, was an imperial princess of the state of Eastern Wu during the Three Kingdoms period of China. She was the elder daughter of Sun Quan,
- Sun Luyu, was an imperial princess of the state of Eastern Wu during the Three Kingdoms period of China. She was the younger daughter of Sun Quan.

== In Romance of the Three Kingdoms ==
In the 14th-century historical novel Romance of the Three Kingdoms, some events of Sun Jian were romanticised by Luo Guanzhong.

Sun Jian first appears the novel in Chapter 2 as a great warrior and descendant of Sun Tzu who takes part in suppressing the Yellow Turban Rebellion. Later, he joins the coalition against Dong Zhuo. In the battle against Hua Xiong, the commander of the enemy army, Sun Jian took off his own red scarf and handed it to Zu Mao (祖茂) when Sun Jian's army was raided. Having distracted Hua Xiong and let Sun Jian escape, Zu Mao was chased after by Hua Xiong, so he hid himself in woods after hanging the scarf on a half-burnt pillar. When Hua Xiong found himself to be fooled, he killed Zu Mao who dashed out of his hideout to challenge him. Hua Xiong then launched an attack on Sun's army, which lasted for a whole night. Sun Jian could not resist Hua Xiong, so he called for assistance from the coalition. Hua Xiong was unrivalled until he met the unfamed Guan Yu.

After Dong Zhuo retreated to Chang'an, Sun Jian was the first to enter Luoyang and ordered to put off the fires set by Dong Zhuo. Seeing the destruction of the imperial capital and Han dynasty, Sun Jian sighed and shed a tear. However, when his men found a jade seal, which was proven to be the imperial seal, Sun Jian grew ambitious and requested to retreat to his base. The news was leaked, to Sun Jian's miscalculation. When Yuan Shao, the leader of the coalition, interrogated Sun Jian, the latter swore by saying, "Should I have hid the treasure, I shall die miserably under arrows!" Under the protection by his guards, Sun Jian left Luoyang immediately.

On the way to his base, Sun Jian passed through Jing Province, where the governor, Liu Biao, was asked by Yuan Shao to attack Sun Jian. Sun Jian badly lost the battle and barely escaped. When he later launched a revenge attack upon Jing Provence, in accordance with the order of his senior, Yuan Shu, he was lured under a cliff where he was shot dead by arrows from the above. Sun's camp reclaimed Sun Jian's corpse using a captive, Huang Zu, who was Liu Biao's brother-in-law. When Dong Zhuo heard of Sun's death in Chang'an, he said, "One of my greatest enemies is removed!" and consequently usurped more power in the imperial court.

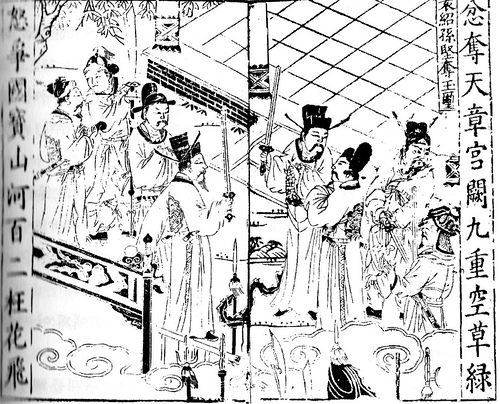
A Qing dynasty illustration of Sun Jian and Yuan Shao fighting over the seal.

== In popular culture ==
Sun Jian is featured as a playable character in Koei's Dynasty Warriors and Warriors Orochi video game series. He also appears in Koei's Romance of the Three Kingdoms series.

He is a playable warlord in the 2019 game Total War: Three Kingdoms by Creative Assembly.

In the SD Gundam series BB Senshi Sangokuden, which is based on Romance of the Three Kingdoms, Sun Jian is characterised as the Gundam Sonken Zephyranthes. His design invokes a white tiger motif as he was known in life as the Tiger of Jiandong.

In Koei's 2023 video game Wo Long: Fallen Dynasty, Sun Jian appears as a character and one of the bosses of the game.

== See also ==
- Lists of people of the Three Kingdoms
