= Zhao Dun =

Zhao Dun or Zhaodun may refer to:

== People ==
- Zhao Dun (Spring and Autumn) (fl. 7th century BC), a minister of the State of Jin during the Spring and Autumn period
- Emperor Guangzong of Song (1147–1200), emperor of the Song dynasty

== Places in China ==
- Zhaodun Township, in Zhuanglang County, Gansu
- Zhaodun, Jiangsu, a town in Pizhou, Jiangsu
