= Xu Chang's rebellion =

Rebellion against the Han dynasty (172-174)

- Part of the conflicts at the end of the Han dynasty
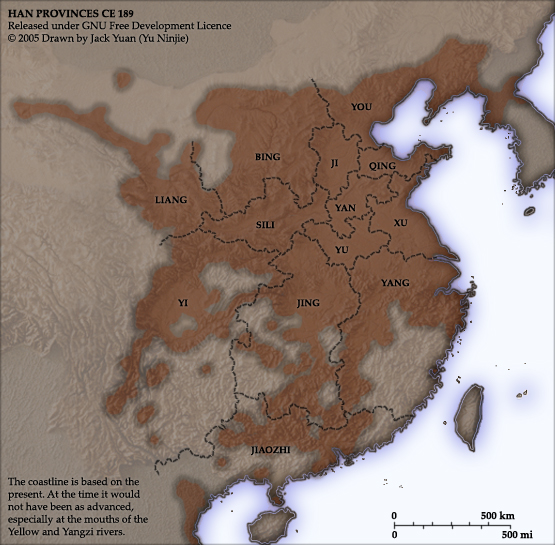
- The rebellion was centered in Kuaiji Commandery in the eastern part of Yang Province
Date	c.December 172 – c.December 174
Location	Kuaiji Commandery and surroundings, Yang Province, Han Empire (China)
Result	Han victory; rebellion suppressed

Belligerents
Han dynasty	State of Yue

Commanders and leaders
Zang Min; Chen Yin; Yin Duan; Sun Jian	Xu Chang †; Xu Sheng †; Ju Kang †

Units involved
Military of the Han dynasty, including local militias	Sect and tribal forces

From late 172 to 174, the religious leader Xu Chang (許昌) led a major uprising against the Han dynasty of China in the Kuaiji Commandery. Having proclaimed himself emperor while restoring the ancient state of Yue, Xu and his followers initially proved successful and overran much of Kuaiji. The Han central government consequently appointed Zang Min (臧旻) as commander of the local pro-government forces and mobilized soldiers from across Yang Province. In late 174, the insurgents were finally destroyed.

== Classical sources ==
Xu Chang's rebellion is mentioned in several classical sources, namely the Dongguan Hanji, Records of the Three Kingdoms, Annals of the Later Han, Book of the Later Han, and the Zizhi Tongjian. (Note: Of the five sources listed, only the Dongguan Hanji was a primary source, being compiled during the Eastern Han dynasty. Chen Shou, compiler of Records, completed the work during the Western Jin, about a century after Xu Chang's rebellion. Yuan Hong, compiler of Annals, lived during the Eastern Jin. Fan Ye, compiler of Book, wrote during the Liu Song dynasty, while Sima Guang, compiler of Tongjian, lived during the Northern Song.) These sources do not give detailed descriptions of the rebellion, and differ on several aspects, including the names and titles of the uprising's leaders. Some differences can be reconciled, while the most likely name of the head of the insurgency is "Xu Chang", as the name is associated with a prophecy about dynastic change in the Zuo Zhuan. By the late 2nd century, many believed that the prophecy claimed that someone named or connected with "xuchang" would overthrow the Han dynasty. Sinologist Rafe de Crespigny argued that the rebel leader probably based his uprising on his name, perhaps even adopting the name "Xu Chang" to fit the prophecy.

== Background ==
The Han dynasty of China faced growing difficulties in the 160s and 170s, as its central government became ever more factionalised and corrupt, while its regional authority suffered from defeats along the northern frontier as well as tensions with the local gentry across the empire. Despite these difficulties, the Han empire remained relatively stable, although religious movements spread as many people sought salvation from plagues and famines. The lower Yangtze region was one of the centers for unorthodox cults opposed to the state ideology of Confucianism. Many heterodox cults promised to provide healing as well as secret knowledge. One of the local sects was led by a man named Xu Chang who claimed to have supernatural powers. His followers probably included both Han Chinese as well as Yue tribespeople.

== Rebellion ==
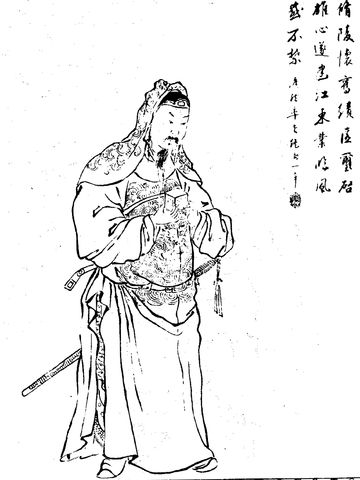
Sun Jian (pictured) rose to prominence during the rebellion, serving with distinction as major in the pro-government army.

Xu Chang launched his uprising at Juzhang (Ningbo) in 172, declaring himself "Emperor of the Brightness of Yang" (陽明皇帝), while appointing his father Xu Sheng "King of Yue", formally reviving the ancient state of the same name that had been destroyed in the 4th or 3rd century BC. (Note: Yue is usually believed to have ended as result of a military conquest by the state of Chu around 333 BC. Despite this, it is possible that a rump or rogue state of Yue continued to be active until the late 3rd century BC.) According to some of the classical sources, Xu Chang had a brother or son named Xu Zhao and/or Xu Shao (許韶) who also received titles. However, it is possible that Xu Zhao / Xu Shao were actually alternate names for Xu Cheng. Besides the Xu family, a local tribal chieftain named Ju Kang served as rebel leader. The rebellion is believed to have been religiously motivated, although sinologist Werner Eichhorn has speculated that the uprising might also have been a nationalist Yue revolt against the Han Chinese. In contrast, de Crespigny considers it unlikely that nationalist motives played a role.

The local armed forces of Kuaiji Administrator Yin Duan failed to defeat the insurgents, allowing them to overrun large parts of the commandery. A member of the local gentry, Sun Jian, was among those ordered to press-gang troops for the government cause. Appointed acting major, he managed to raise a militia of about 1,000 men. He and his force served with distinction while fighting the rebels.

Despite the efforts of Kuaiji Commandery's loyalists, the insurgents were already so successful that they even invaded other commanderies. As result, the government appointed the official Zang Min as Inspector of Yang Province to deal with the issue. Troops from the entire province were mobilized, with Chen Yin (陈夤 or 陈寅), Administrator of Danyang, becoming Zang's most important co-commander. In 173, the provincial authorities reported Administrator Yin Duan for his failure to defeat the rebels, but his registrar Zhu Jun successfully bribed officials in the capital of Luoyang so that Yin only received a convict sentence instead of being executed.

The troops of Zang Min and Chen Yin finally suppressed the uprising in late 174, killing Xu Chang, Xu Sheng, and Ju Kang.

== Aftermath ==
Zang Min was rewarded for his success by being appointed Administrator of Danyang. He also recommended Sun Jian for his good service, whereupon the latter got a post as assistant magistrate in Guangling Commandery, and later in two counties in Xiapi. Sun Jian consequently expanded his following which helped him to rise to great prominence.

Zhu Jun's involvement in the bribery to save Yin Duan's life initially remained unknown. He went on to have a distinguished career, faithfully serving the central government until the collapse of the Han dynasty into civil war.
