= Tushan =

Tushan may refer to:

- Tushan, Chongqing (涂山), a town in Chongqing, China
- Tushan, Jiangsu (土山), a town in Pizhou, Jiangsu, China
- Tushan, Shandong (土山), a town in Laizhou, Shandong, China
- Tushan Township (涂山乡), a township in Jiange County, Sichuan, China
- Tushan, Iran, a village in Anjirabad Rural District, Central District, Gorgan County, Golestan Province, Iran
- Tushhan, also spelled Tushan, a historical Kurdish village in Mesopotamia
