= Xu Chang =

Xu Chang may refer to:

- leader of Xu Chang's rebellion in the 170s in China
- Xuchang, a city in China
- Jian'an, Xuchang, formerly Xuchang County
