= Gao Mausoleum =

Building in Jiangsu Province, China

Gao Mausoleum (高陵) is located in the north of Dafen Village, Situ Town, in China's Jiangsu province. It is the tomb of Sun Jian, a war leader during the Three Kingdoms (220–265).

== Construction and layout ==
It is 18 metres (59 ft) tall and around 130 metres (430 ft) in diameter. There is a river to the east of the mausoleum, which was called Wuling Harbor in ancient times.

== History ==
Sun Jian moved from Shouchun (now Fuyang in Zhejiang Province) to Qu'e (now Danyang) with his father Sun Zhong in the late Eastern Han Dynasty. Under the regime of Han Xiandi, Sun Jian crusaded against Dong Zhuo and was ordered by Yuan Shu to make a punitive expedition against Liu Biao. During the campaign, he was shot by Liu's general, Huang Zu. He was only 37 years old when he died. After his son Sun Quan became emperor, he gave his father the posthumous title "Emperor Wulie".
