= Guan Zhaoye =

Chinese architect and scholar (1929–2022)

- 关肇邺
- Born: 4 October 1929; Beijing, China
- Died: 26 December 2022 (aged 93); Beijing, China
- Education: Yenching University; Tsinghua University
- Scientific career
- Fields: Architecture
- Workplaces: Tsinghua University

Chinese name
- Simplified Chinese: 关肇邺
- Traditional Chinese: 關肇鄴
Transcriptions
Standard Mandarin
- Hanyu Pinyin: Guān Zhàoyè

Guan Zhaoye (Chinese: 关肇邺; 4 October 1929 – 26 December 2022) was a Chinese architect who was a professor at Tsinghua University, and an academician of the Chinese Academy of Engineering.

== Biography ==
Guan was born in Beijing, on 4 October 1929, while his ancestral home is in Nanhai, Guangdong. His father Guan Genglin was a poet, scholar and industrialist. His elder male cousin Guan Zhaozhi was a mathematician and member of the Chinese Academy of Sciences. He attended Beijing Yuying High School, a school run by the American Church. In 1947, he entered Yenching University, but transferred to Tsinghua University a year later.

After graduating in 1952, Guan stayed and taught at Tsinghua University, where he was promoted to associate professor in 1978 and to full professor in 1984. From 1981 to 1982, he was a visiting scholar at Massachusetts Institute of Technology.

On 26 December 2022, he died at Beijing Changgeng Hospital, at the age of 93.

== Buildings designed by Guan ==
- Dongsi Shitiao station of Beijing Subway
- Tsinghua University Library
- Buildings of School of Science, Tsinghua University
- Building of Medical School of Tsinghua University
- Taizhou Library
- Peking University Library
- Xuzhou Museum
- Second Teaching Building of Hainan University
- Xi'an Eurasian University Library
- Decorative reliefs on the Monument to the People's Heroes

== Honours and awards ==
- 1995 Member of the Chinese Academy of Engineering (CAE)
- 2000 Liang Sicheng Architecture Prize
- 2005 World Chinese Architects Association Architectural Design Award
