= Chahe, Pizhou =

Chahe 岔河镇
- Town
- Location in Jiangsu
- Coordinates: 34°32′24″N 117°53′51″E
- Country: People's Republic of China
- Province: Jiangsu
- Prefecture-level city: Xuzhou
- County-level city: Pizhou
- Time zone: UTC+8 (China Standard)

Chahe (Chinese: 岔河; pinyin: Chàhé) is a town in Pizhou, Jiangsu. As of 2020, it administers the following twelve villages:

- Chahe Village
- Xihuangshi Village (西黄石村)
- Qiaonan Village (桥南村)
- Qiaobei Village (桥北村)
- Linqiao Village (林桥村)
- Mazhuang Village (马庄村)
- Yangdun Village (样墩村)
- Yanchu Village (颜楚村)
- Shengjia Village (盛家村)
- Liangbi Village (良壁村)
- Dongshazhuang Village (东沙庄村)
- Maji Village (马季村)
