= Xuzhou Museum =

Art museum in Xuzhou, Jiangsu, China

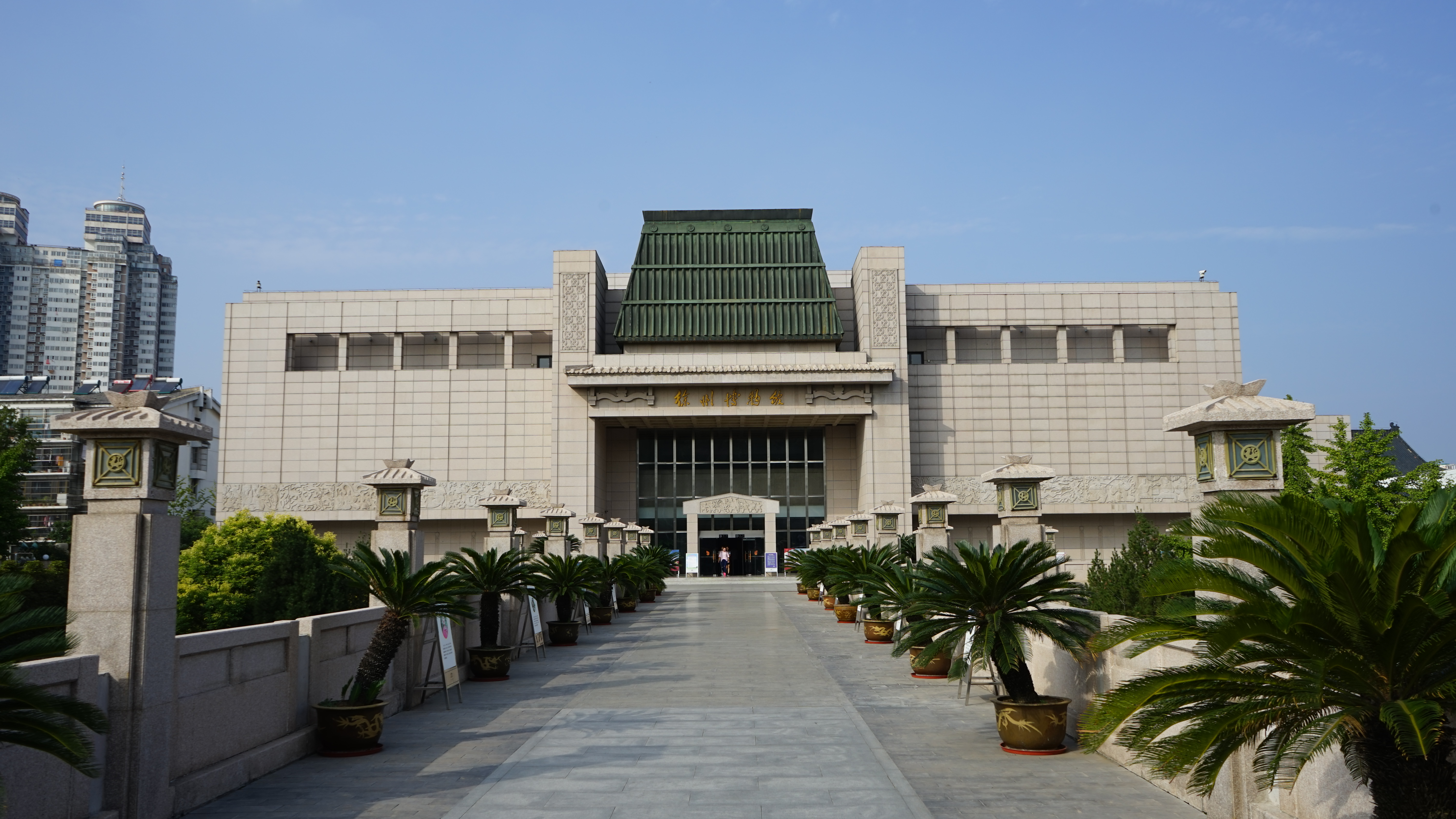
- Exterior of the Xuzhou Museum

- Location within Eastern China
- Established: 1959
- Location: Xuzhou, Jiangsu, China
- Coordinates: 34°15′54″N 117°11′13″E
- Type: Asia in art
- Website: www.xzmuseum.com/eindex.aspx

Xuzhou Museum is a comprehensive museum of historical Chinese art in Xuzhou, Jiangsu, China, which was founded in 1959. Originally the site of one of the Qianlong Emperor's Palaces at the northern foot of Yunlong Mountain, the Xuzhou Museum was established in 1959, expanded in 1999, then rebuilt and extended in 2010, with work completed in 2012. At present, it encompasses an area of 40,000 square meters. The museum includes a four-story exhibition building and administers the Xanadu Palace and Stone Tablet Garden of the Qianlong Emperor of the Qing dynasty built for his inspection tour of the south of the Yangtze River in 1757. It also administers three tombs of the Pengcheng King of the Eastern Han dynasty in Tushan, that includes an excavation site of Han dynasty terracotta warriors and horses.

== Collections ==
The museum's collections number 15,577 objects displayed in seven galleries, “Metal Hardware and Battle Steed”, “Treasures of the Han dynasty”, “Marvelous Jade of the Han dynasty”, “Ornate Terracotta Figurines”, “Chinese Porcelain and Other Collections”, “Qing-style furniture”, and “ancient Chinese painting and calligraphy donated by Deng Yongqing” representing 6,000 years of civilization.

The region around Xuzhou, once known as the ancient city of Pengcheng, became a thriving trading center because of its strategic location between north and south China and once rich alluvial soil deposited by the annual flood of the Yellow River. It has yielded artifacts up to one million years old. The Xizyuandun Longshan Culture Ruins are the remains of a Neolithic settlement of the Dawenkou culture dating back to 4100 BCE. The museum includes Neolithic artifacts among its collections.

The early tribal cultures in the area transitioned to a chiefdom under the rule of legendary figure Peng Zu in the 2nd millennium followed by successive military conquests beginning with King Wu Ding of Shang in around 1208 BCE. Military artifacts on display range from the armor of the Han and Chu periods to the weapons of the Tang, Song and Yuan Dynasties and armor and artillery of the Ming dynasty. Jade burial suits and funerary artifacts from the Han dynasty tombs of the King of Chu and the King of Pengcheng are also presented.

== Gallery ==
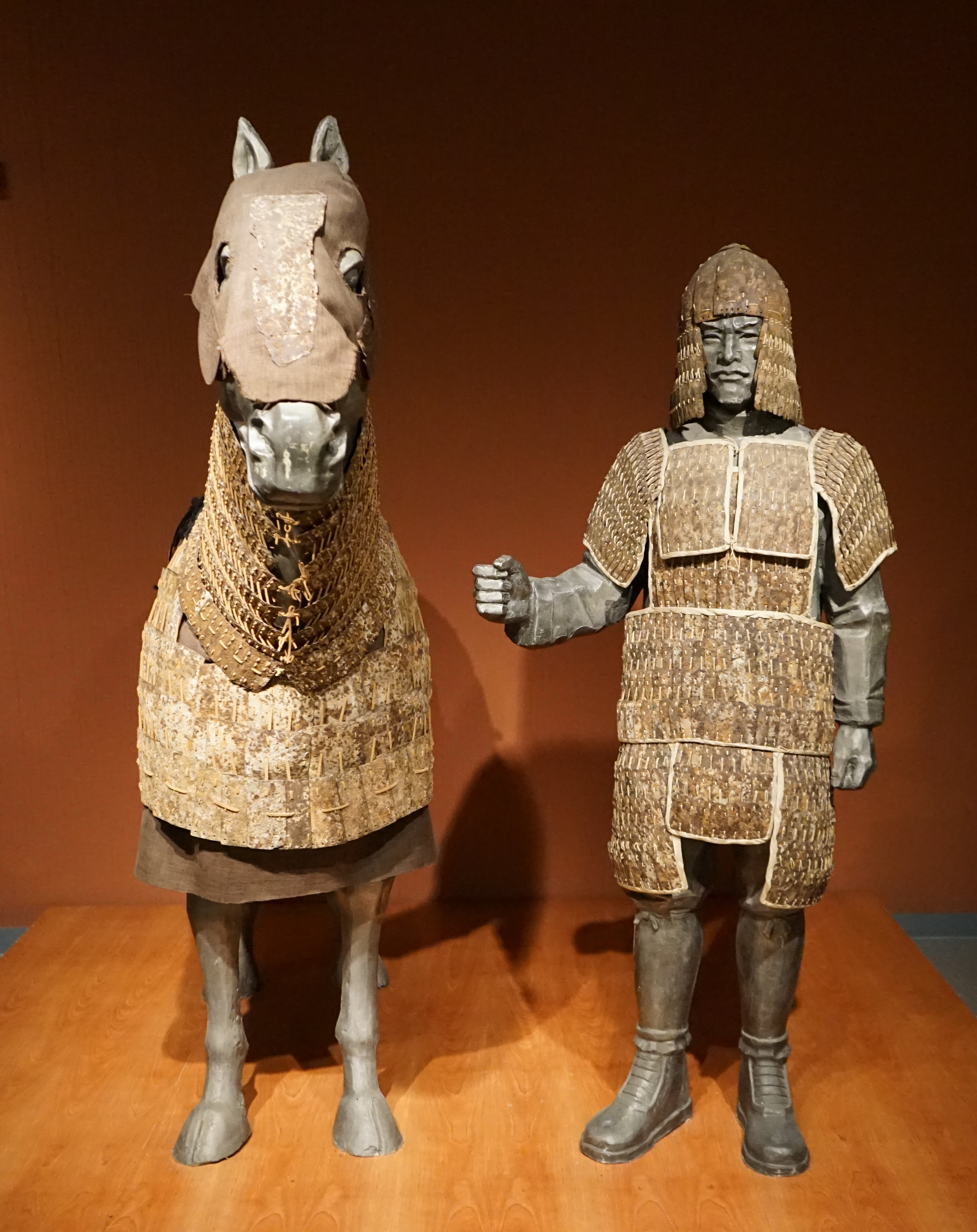
Heavily armored Cavalry

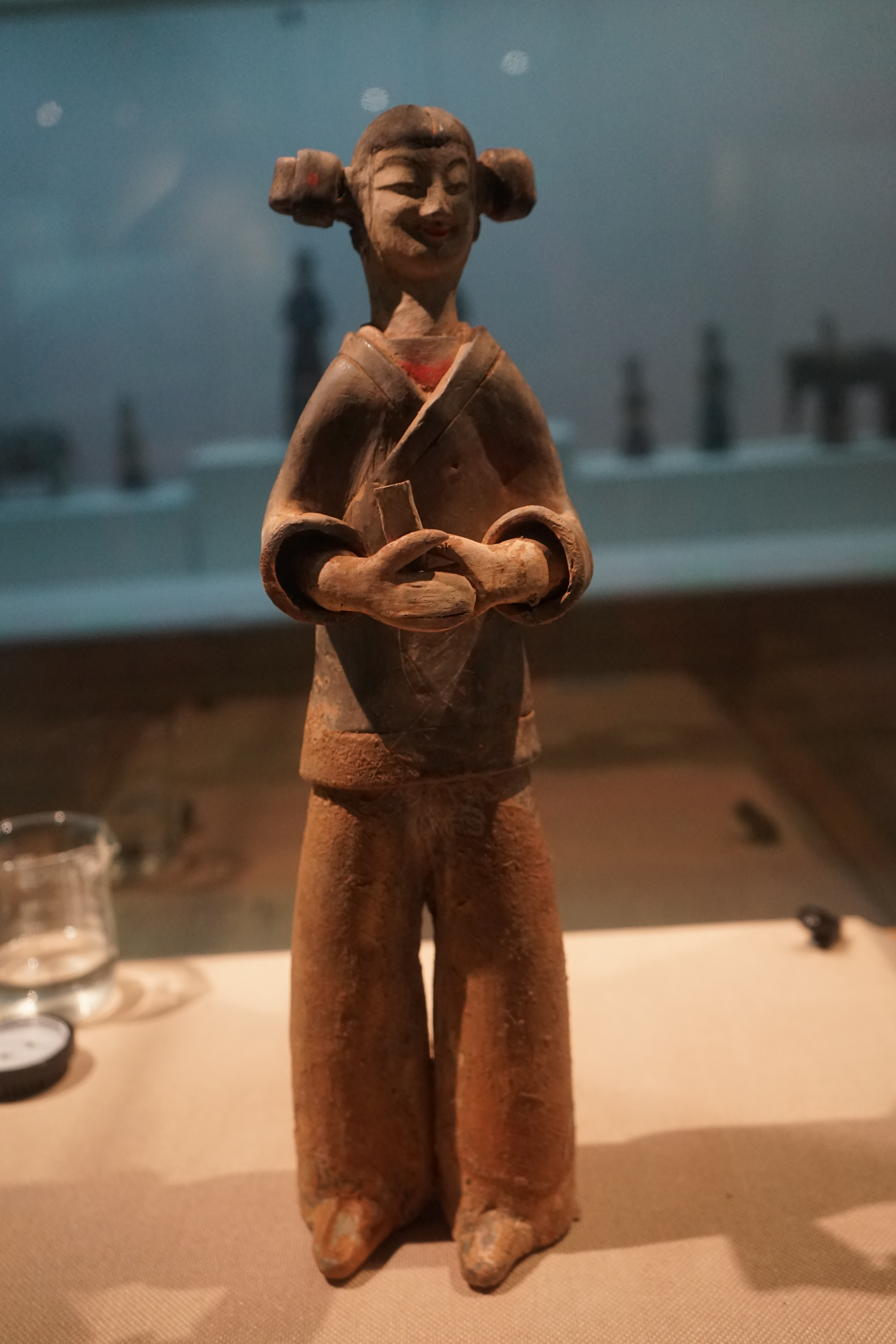
Colored standing female figurine with double hair buns, holding a hu (ritual baton)

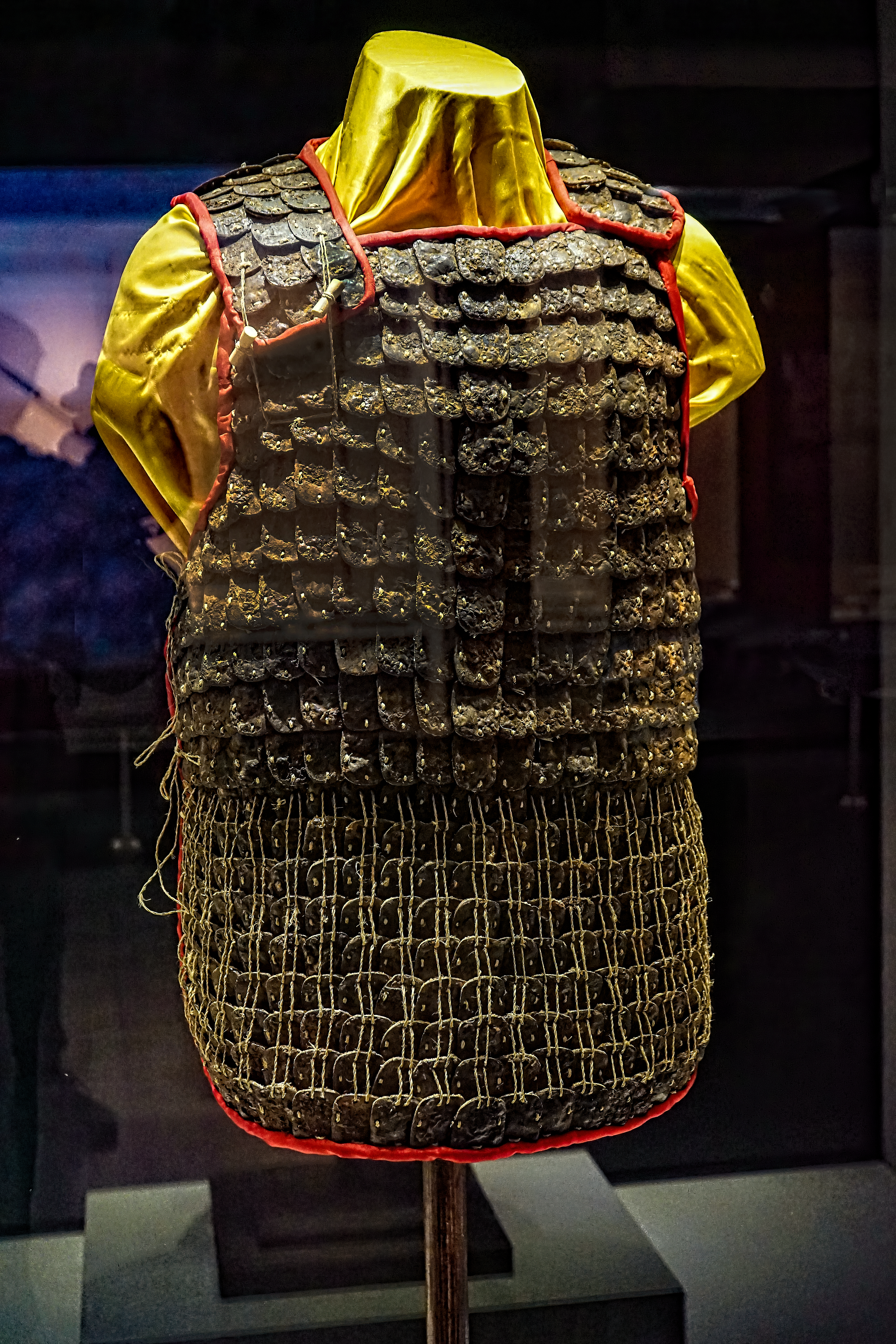
Armored vest

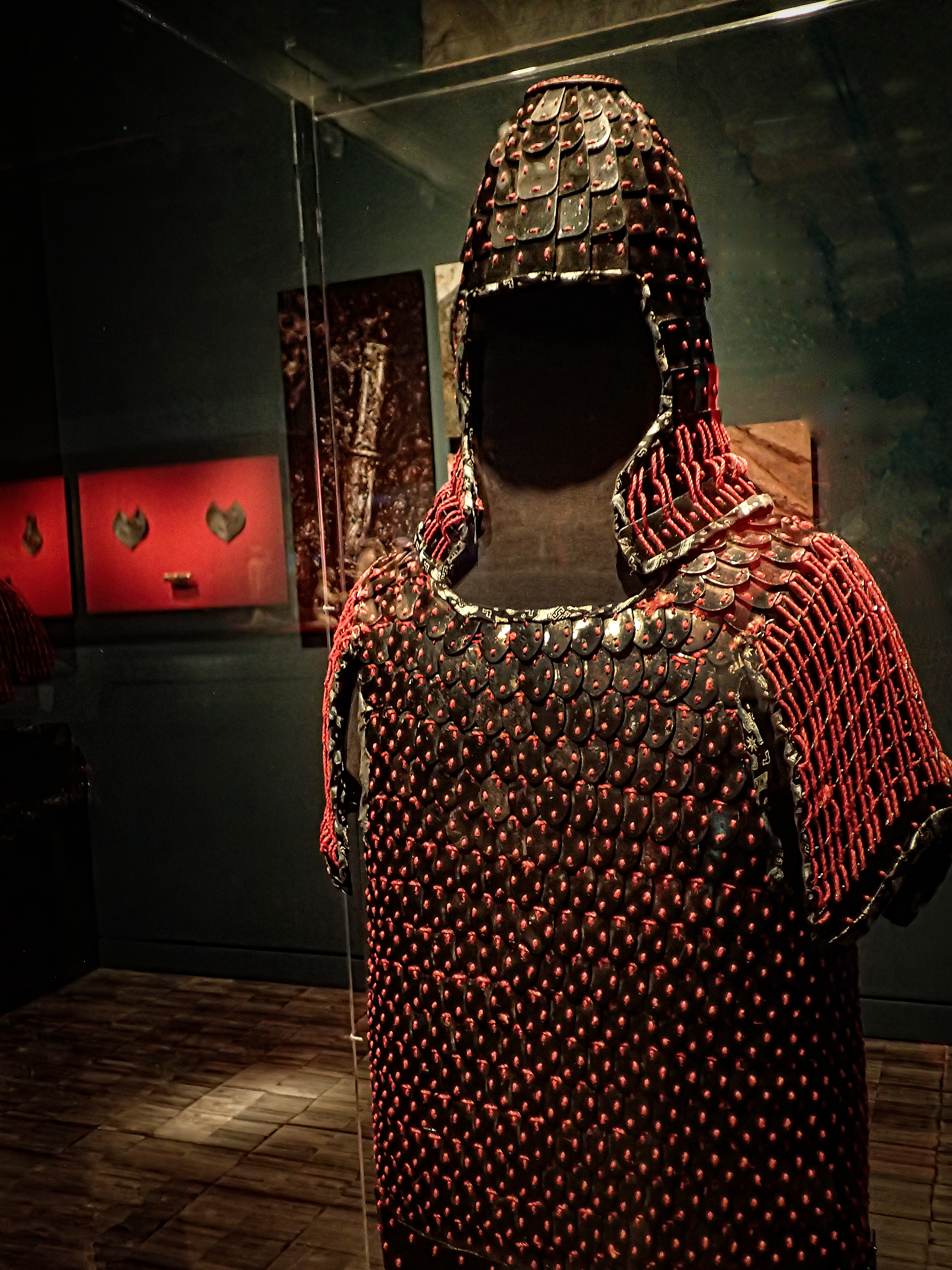
Lamellar corselet (resembling Scale) and helmet of the Western Han dynasty 2nd century BCE

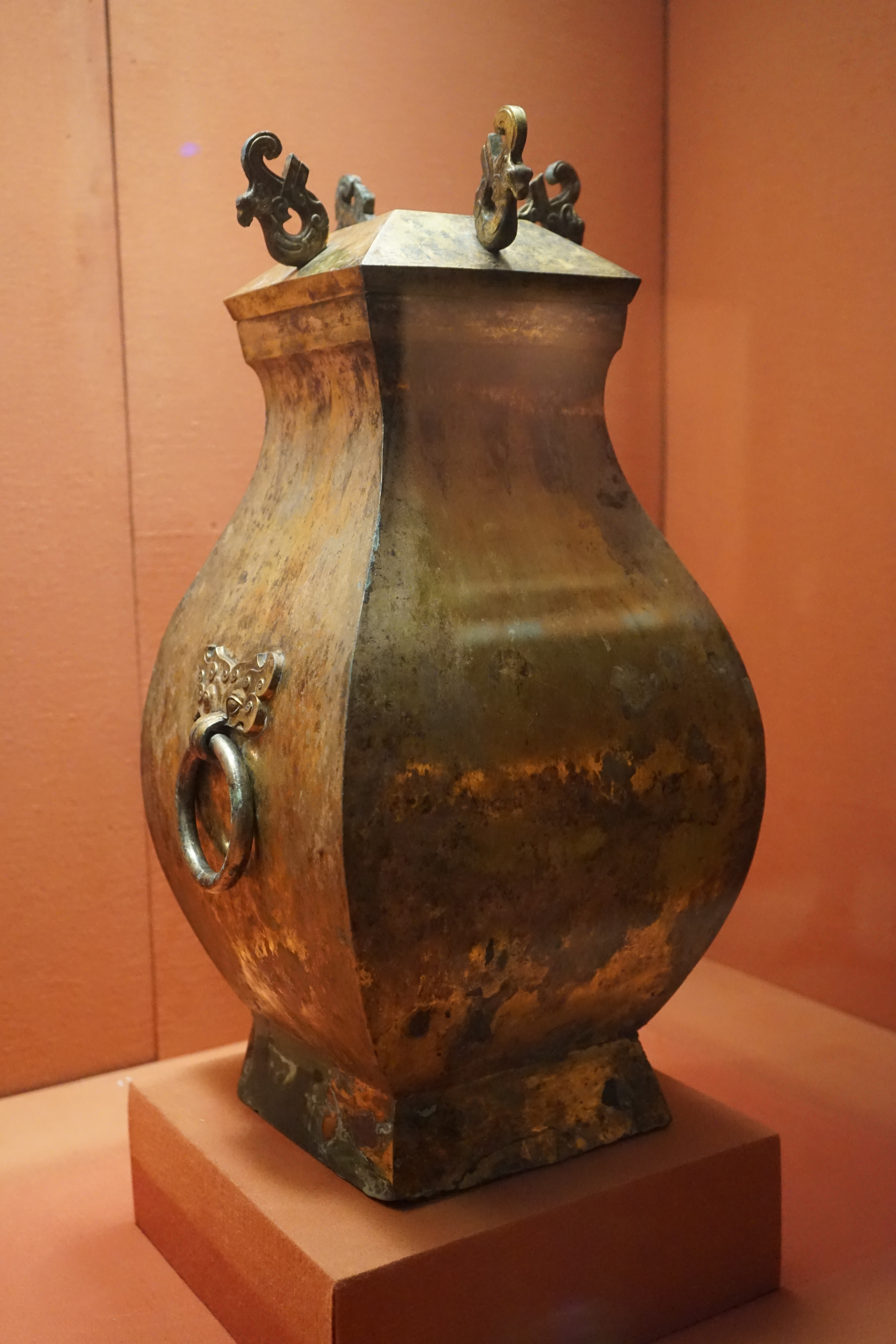
Shizishan Bronze Fang

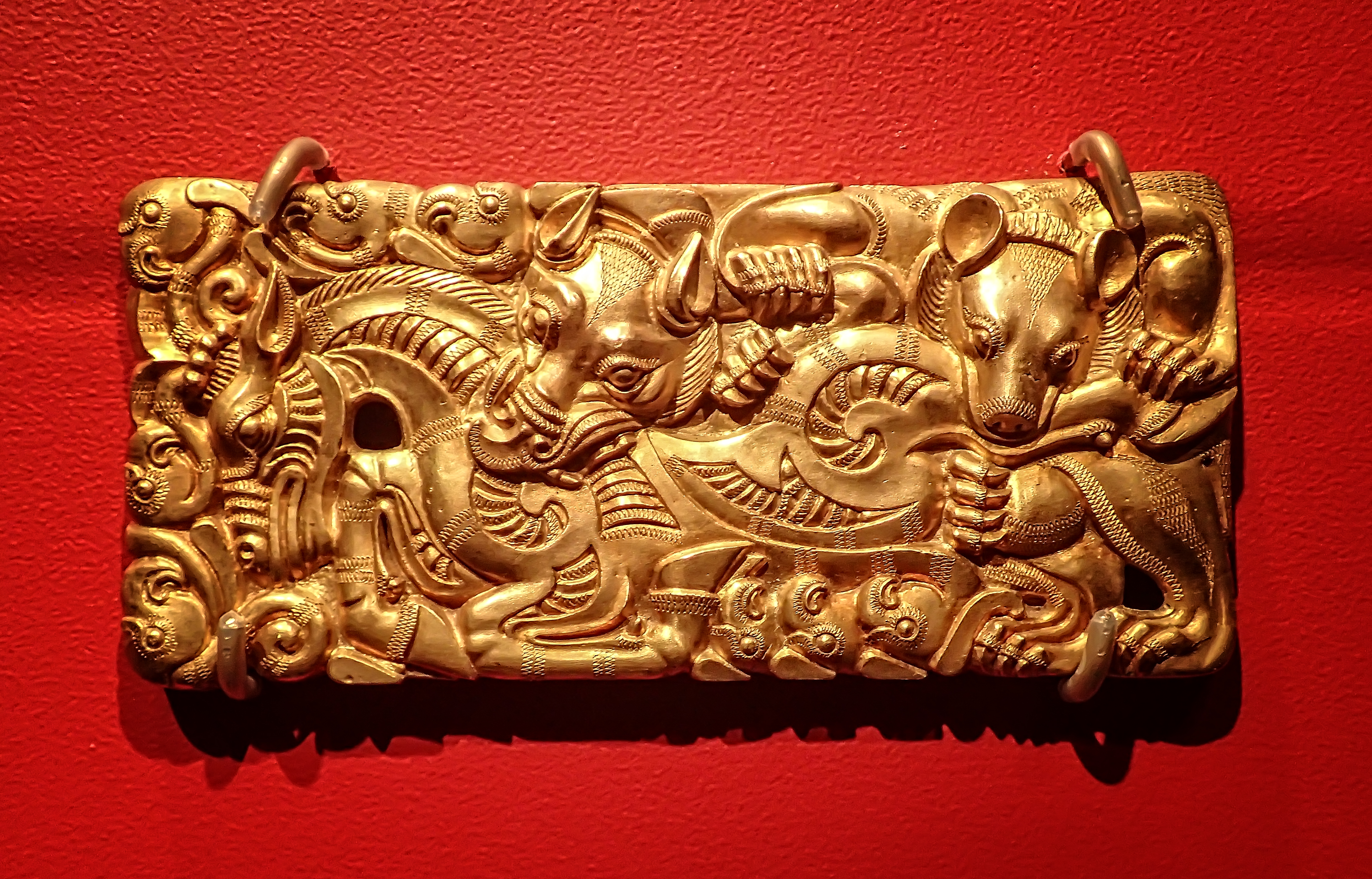
Gold belt buckle from Western Han dynasty tomb Tianqi Mountain Xuzhou Jiangsu 2nd century BCE

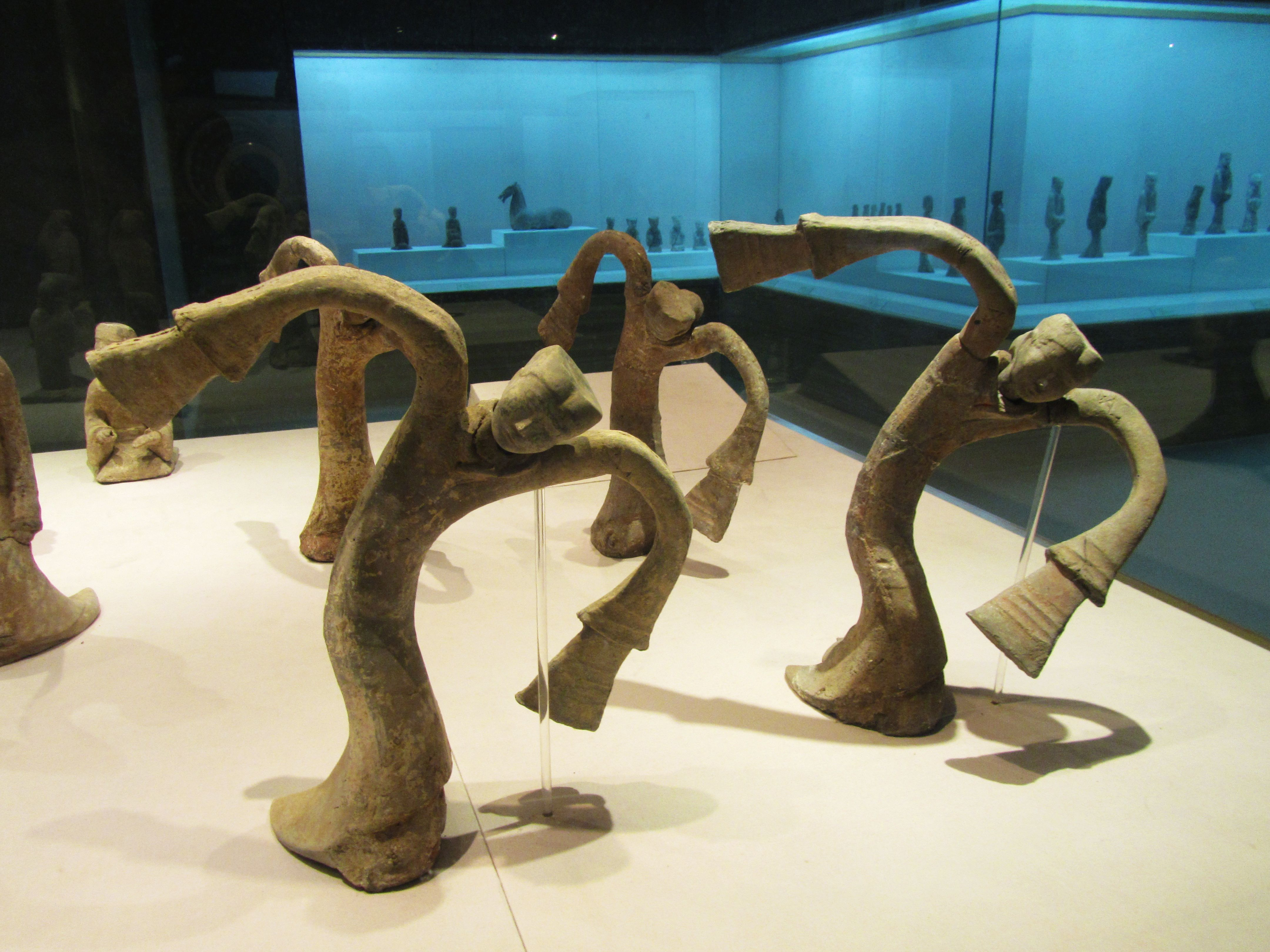
Dancer Figurines

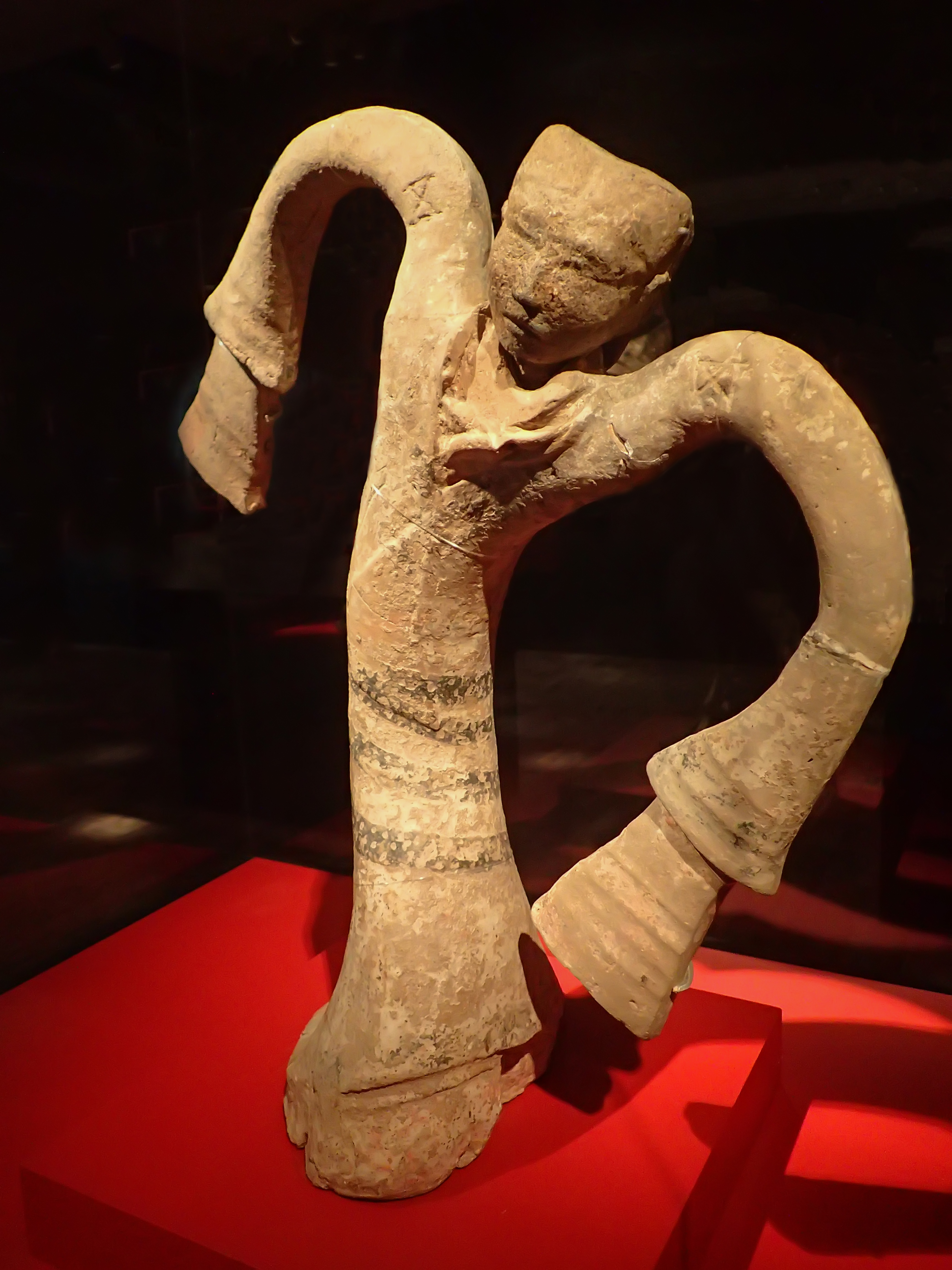
Dancer figurine from the Tomb of the King of Chu Tuolan Mountain Xuzhou Jinagsu Western Han 2nd century BCE

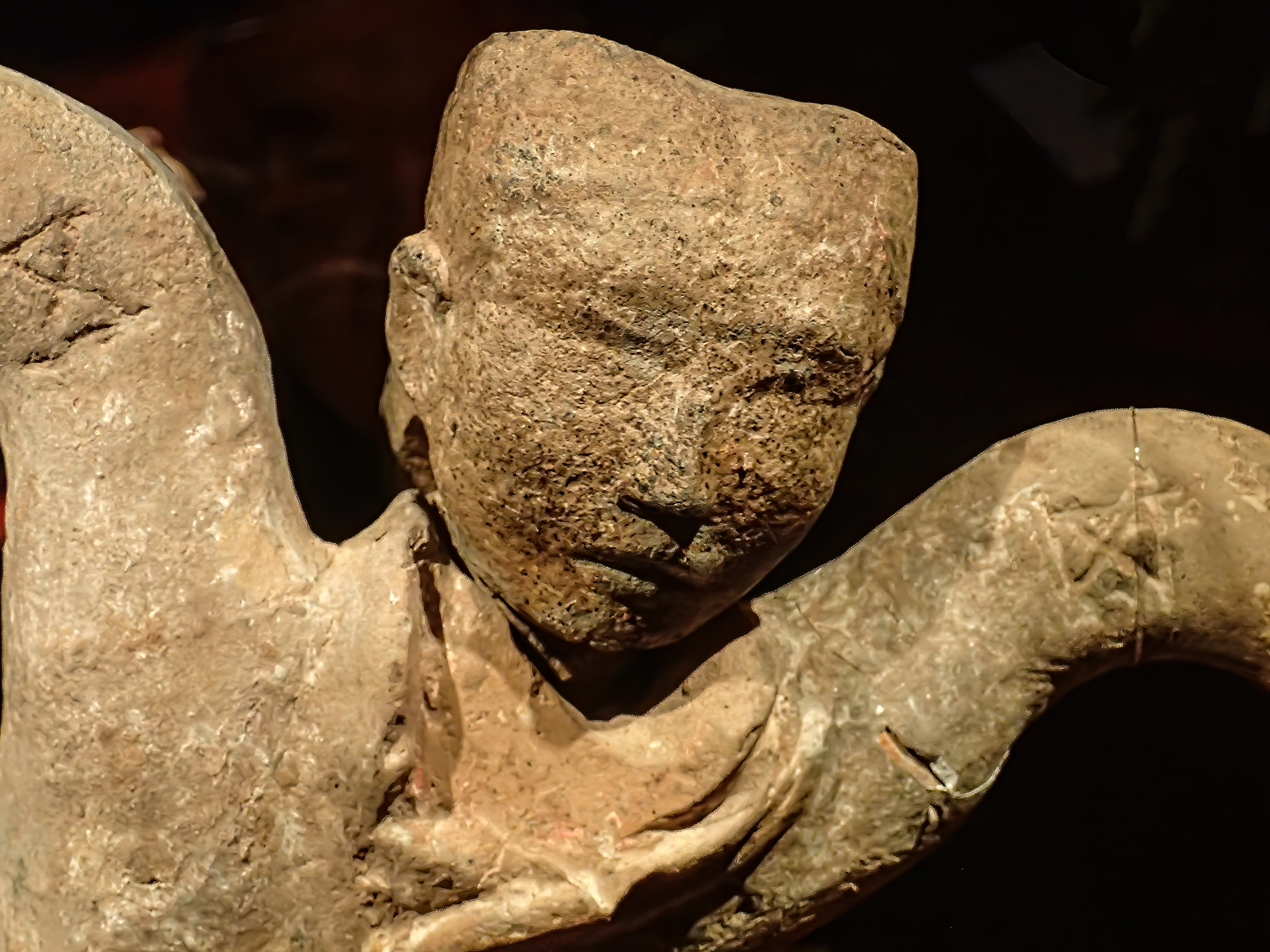
Closeup of earthenware dancer figurine from the Tomb of the King of Chu Tuolan Mountain Xuzhou Jiangsu Western han 2nd century BCE

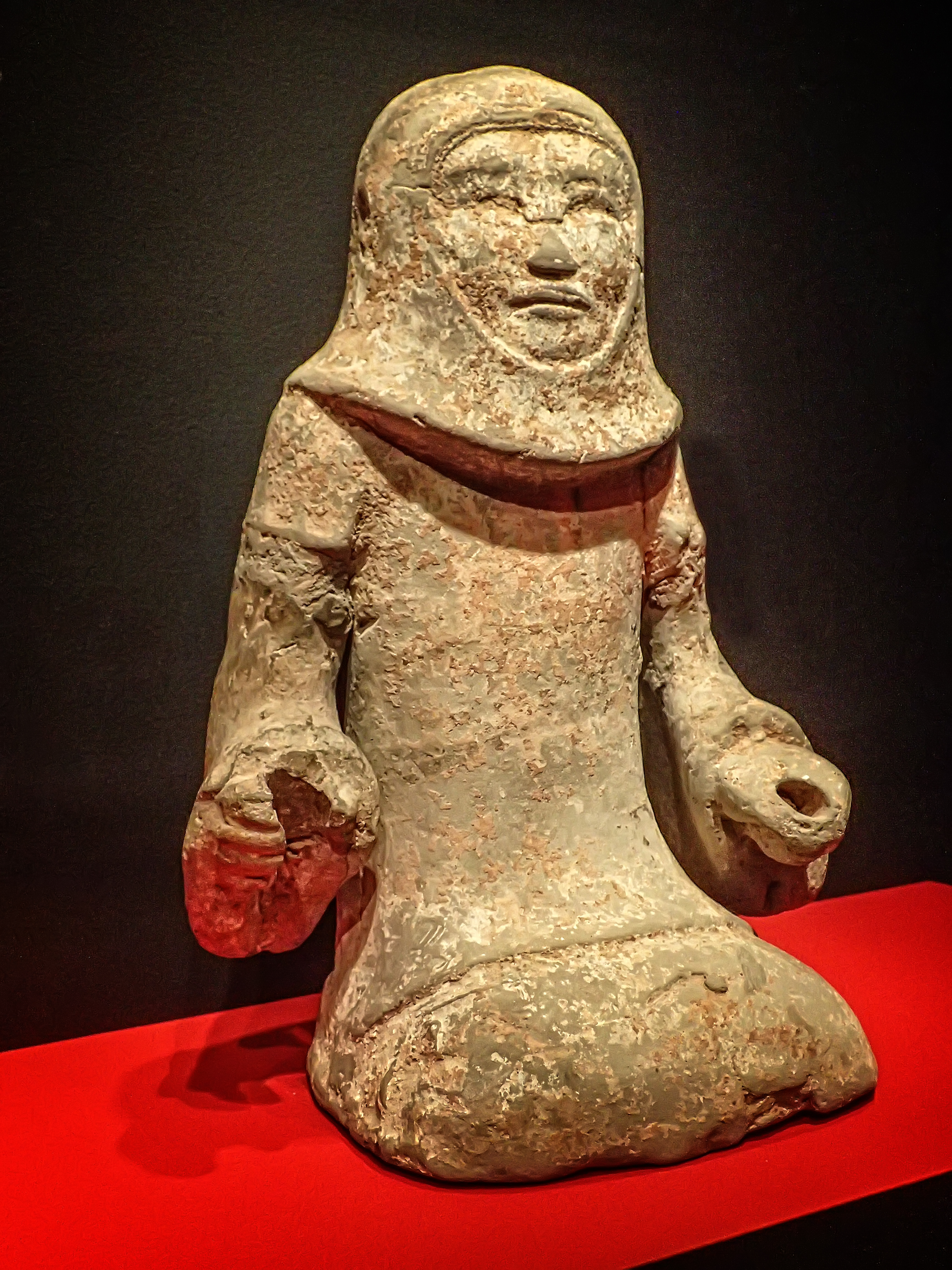
Kneeling warrior figurine from the Earthenware Warrior Pit 1 Shizi Mountain Xuzhou Jiangsu Western Han 2nd century BCE

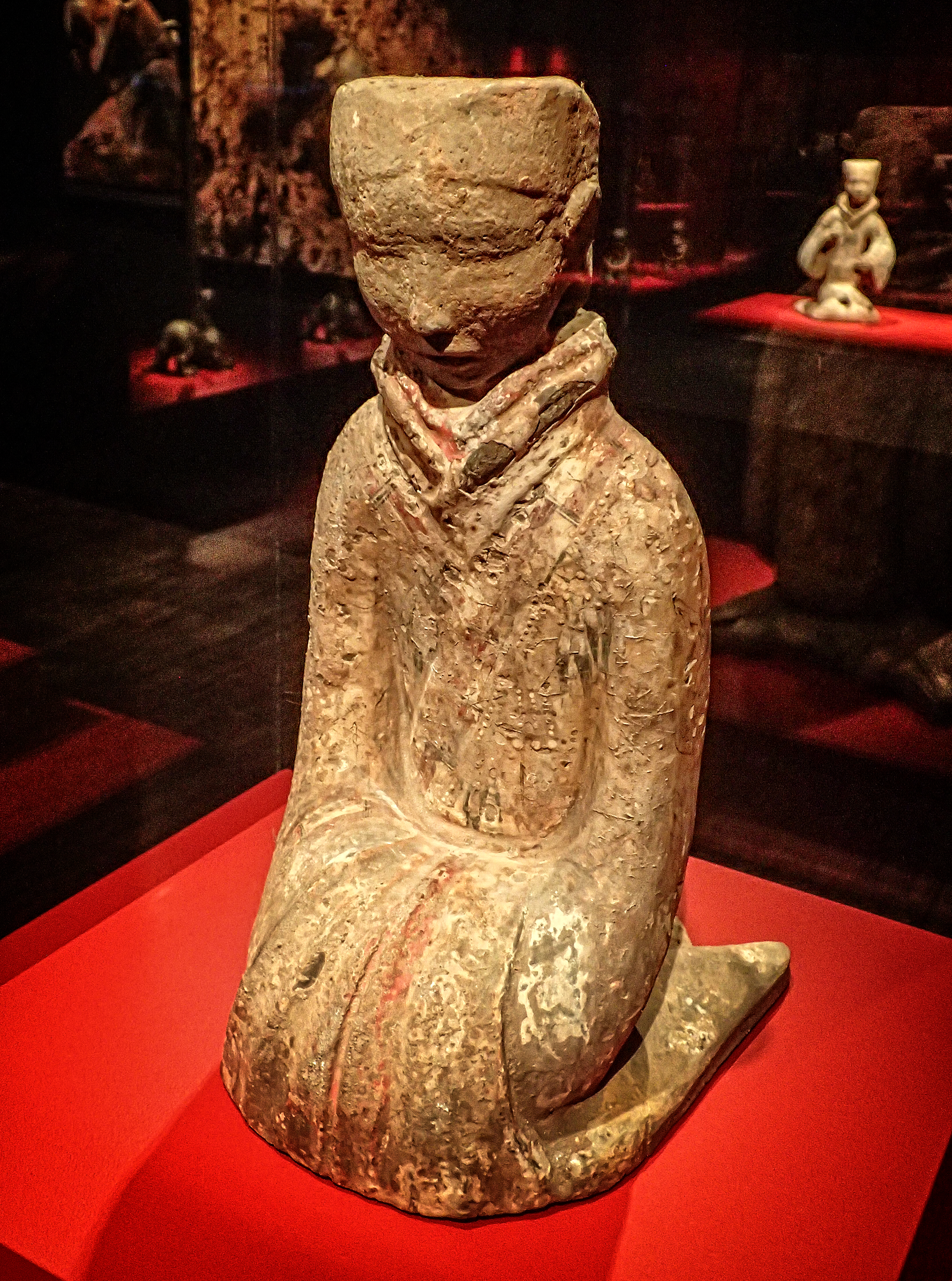
Kneeling female figurine from the Tomb of the King of Chu Beidong Mountain Xuzhou Jiangsu Western han 2nd century BCE

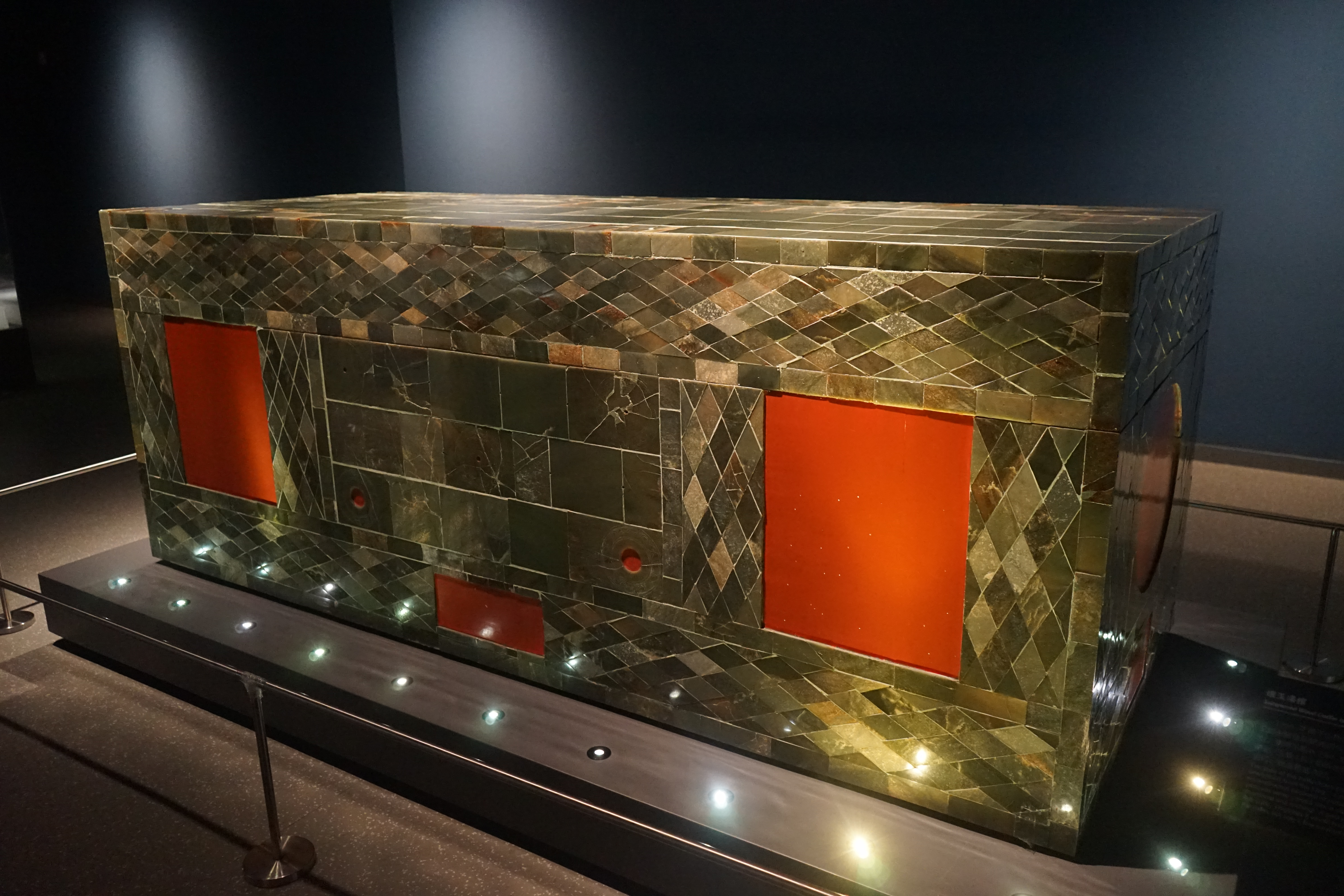
Lacquered Wood Coffin Inlaid with Jade, Shizishan

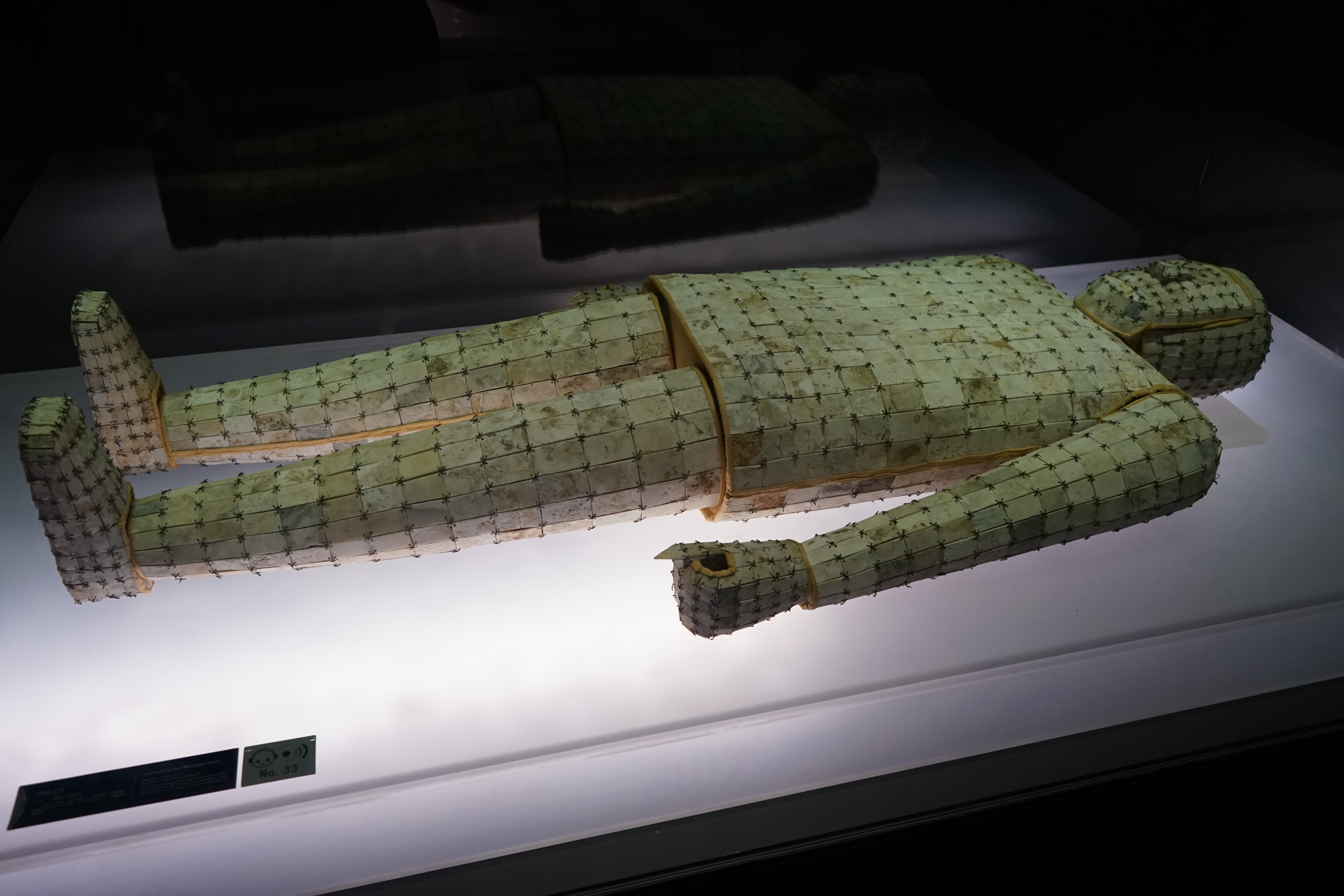
Jade Burial Suit Sewn With Copper Thread, Lalishan

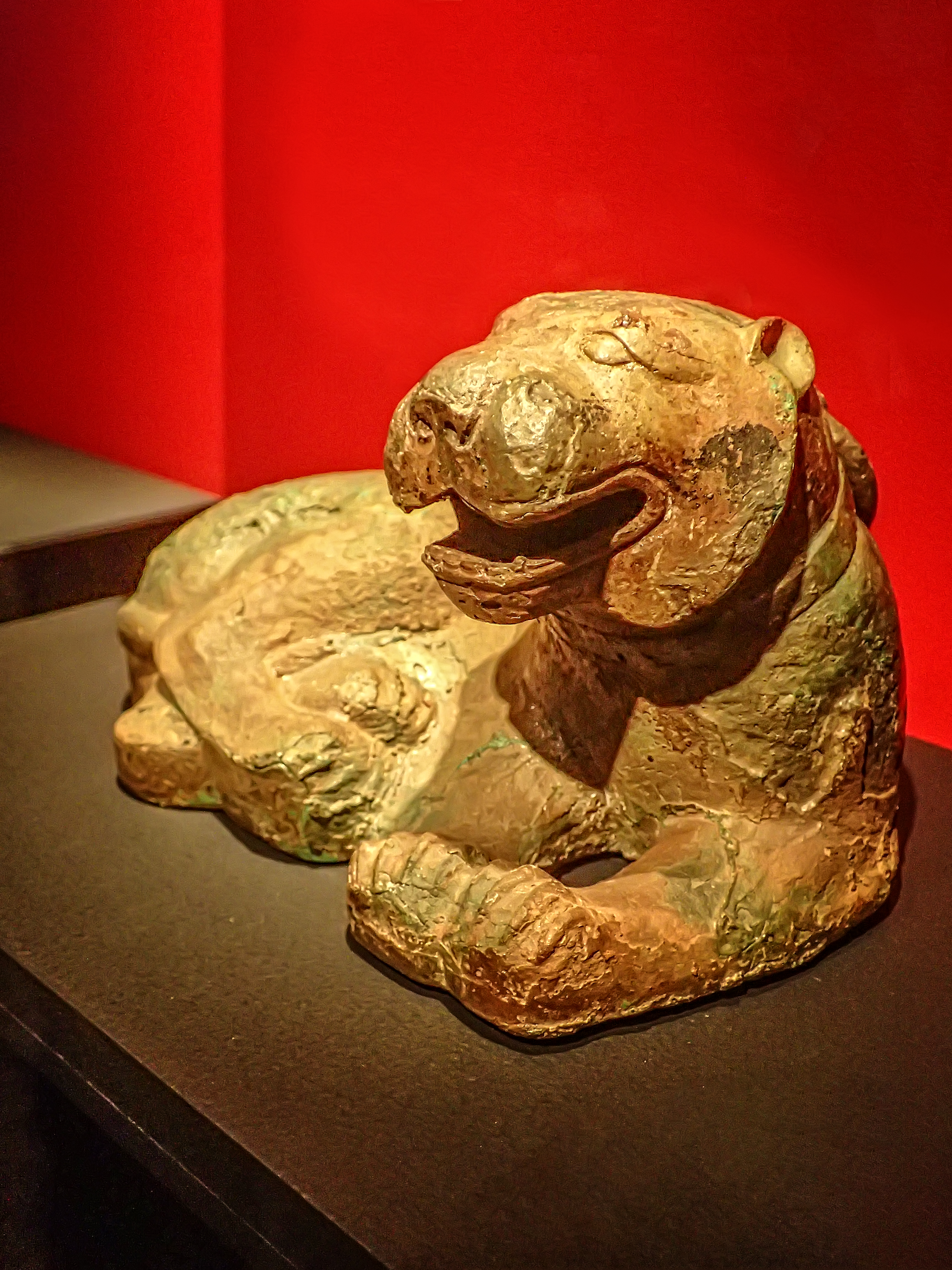
Mat weight in the shape of a leopard in bronze and lead from the Tomb of the King of Chu Shizi Mountain Xuzhou Jiangsu Western Han 2nd century BCE

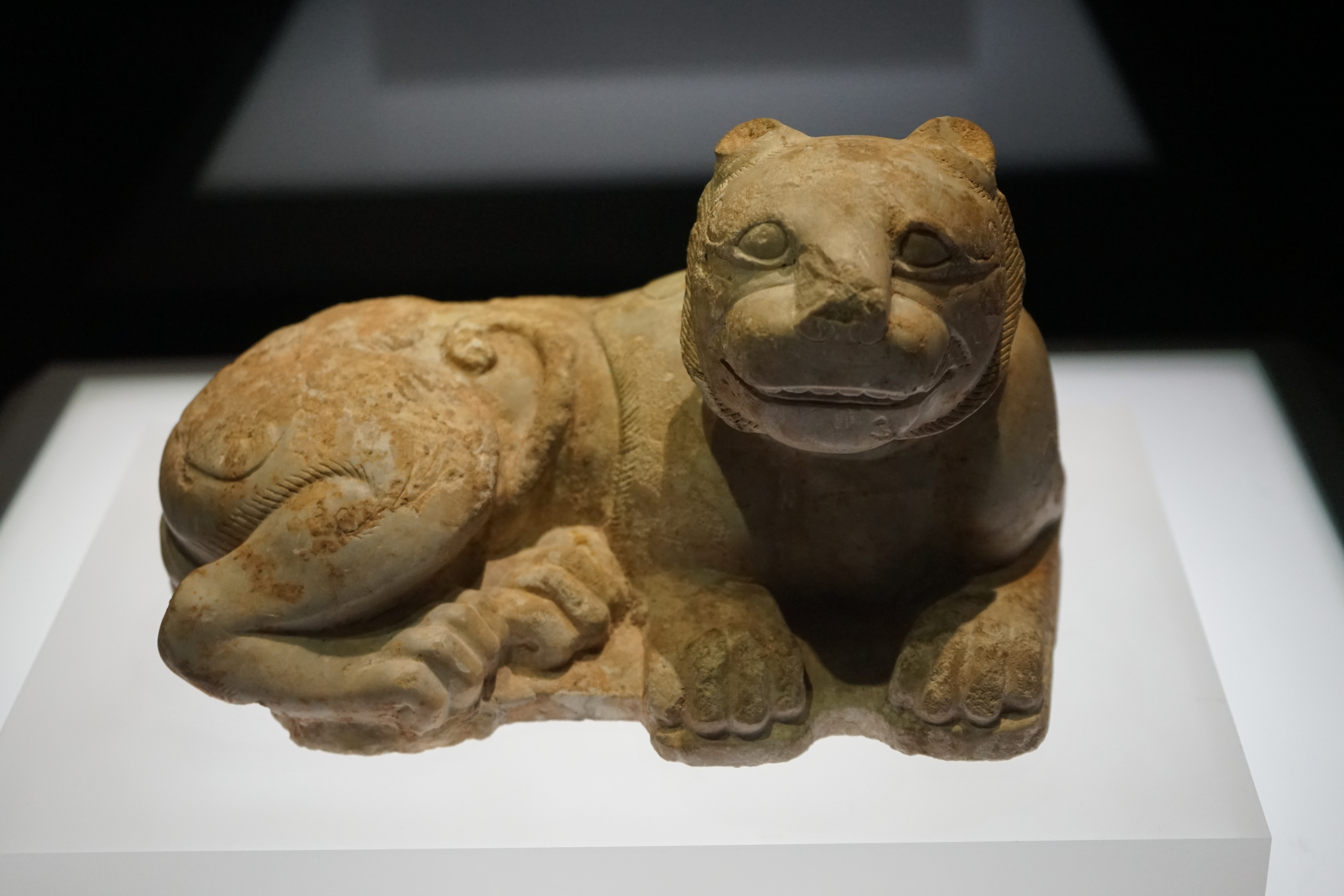
Leopard-shaped stone weight

== Han Dynasty Terracotta Warriors and Horses ==
The terracotta warriors and horses excavation site covers 6,000 square meters (1.5 acres) and includes 4,800 pieces of terracotta warriors and horses interred during the burial of Liu Wu, the third king of the Chu Kingdom during the Western Han dynasty. The sculptures were found in 1984 in six pits, three infantry pits, one pottery-guard pit, one cavalry pit and one chariot pit. But, only two infantry pits and the pottery-guard pit have been fully excavated. The two infantry pits yielded 2,393 figures but they are smaller in size, about a foot tall, than the life-sized Xi'an terracotta warriors and horses from the Qin dynasty. The figures were arranged in a battle formation of the Chu Kingdom and soldiers still armed with crossbows and wearing armor of the period are posed both standing and kneeling. As subjects of the dead Chu king, the warriors are depicted with respectful though sorrowful expressions. Since citizens of the period between 18 and 55 were required to join the army in times of conflict, the sculptures portray both young and older soldiers.

== Other Archaeology ==
Museum archaeologists have also participated in excavations of Western Zhou and Han dynasty sites at Miao Taizi and Jiaozhuang in Jiawang, the Woniushan Tombs, the Wanda Plaza Tombs, the Kuishan Tombs, and the Tiechashan Tombs.
