= Li Lianyu =

Chinese politician

- 李连玉

Deputy Party Secretary of Ili Kazakh Autonomous Prefecture
- In office August 2013 – September 2014

Vice-Mayor of Xuzhou
- In office January 2006 – September 2014

Communist Party Secretary of Pizhou
- In office December 2002 – January 2006

Mayor of Pizhou
- In office December 2000 – December 2002

Personal details
- Born: December 1959 (age 66) Feng County, Jiangsu, China
- Party: Chinese Communist Party (1985–2017; expelled)
- Education: Nanjing University of Science and Technology

Chinese name
- Traditional Chinese: 李連玉
- Simplified Chinese: 李连玉
Transcriptions
Standard Mandarin
- Hanyu Pinyin: Lǐ Liányù

Li Lianyu (Chinese: 李连玉; born December 1959) is a former Chinese politician who spent most of his career in Jiangsu province. Through his career he successively served as the Communist Party Secretary of the county-level city of Pizhou, the Vice-Mayor of Xuzhou, and Deputy Communist Party Secretary of the Ili Kazakh Autonomous Prefecture, in Xinjiang. He was removed from office in September 2014, and was investigated by the Chinese Communist Party's anti-graft agency in November 2014.

Li was known nationally for the massive "red carpet reception" held for him when he returned to his hometown after attending the 17th Party Congress in 2007. Thousands of locals lined the city's streets to receive the Secretary. The event drew significant ridicule and criticism for its unnecessary extravagance and what seemed to be a local cult of personality.

== Early career ==
Li was born and raised in Feng County, Jiangsu. Li began his political career in August 1975, and joined the Chinese Communist Party in February 1985.

In August 1975, Li was appointed as an official in Xuzhou Coal Mining Bureau and over a period of eight years worked his way up to the position of Deputy Secretary of the Communist Youth League of Feng County. He then spent six years serving in various political roles at the Organization Department of CCP Feng County Committee, before serving as CCP Party Chief of Dahe Town.

In December 1998 he was promoted to become the Vice-County Governor of Feng County, a position he held until December 2000. He entered the College of Humanities of Nanjing University of Science and Technology in September 1998 as a part-time student. There he studied political theory; he graduated in November 2000.

== 17th Party Congress incident ==
He became the Mayor of Pizhou, a county-level city under the jurisdiction of Xuzhou, in December 2000, and then the Communist Party Secretary, the top political position in the city, beginning in December 2002. By 2006, Li further was elevated to the concurrent post of the Vice-Mayor of Xuzhou.

In 2007, Li was selected as a local delegate to the 17th National Congress of the Chinese Communist Party, an event that occurs once every five years. A total of 2,213 delegates attended the Congress. Upon returning to Pizhou after attending the Party Congress, thousands of city residents from all walks of life, including the local paramilitary forces, soldiers, officials, nurses, students, and ordinary farmers, mobilized to greet his 'victorious return' in an unprecedented display, including a full "red carpet reception".

Images of the event quickly went viral around the Chinese internet. They included depictions of Li shaking hands with ordinary people who lined the streets to greet him, a giant red banner hoisted that read "Our most heartfelt welcome for the victorious return of Secretary Li Lianyu from Beijing!", various lion dancers and live fireworks. The fact that such a high-profile ceremony was planned for a county-level official for simply coming back to town after a party congress was ridiculed and heavily criticized online. In response, the city officials responded that the reception ceremony was planned by Pizhou residents; they also pointed out that no other county-level official in Northern Jiangsu had earned the distinction of being a delegate to the Congress. According to Pizhou officials, Li was the first Pizhou resident to become a delegate to the National Congress of the Communist Party since the party organization was founded in the county in 1928, asserting that this brought great pride to the people of Pizhou and was a cause worthy of "celebration". Prior to his departure for the Congress, high-profile receptions were held at 4-star hotels in the city to "send off" the Secretary.

== Leading Pizhou ==
After the incident, Li was dubbed pejoratively by some Chinese-language media as the "Red Carpet Secretary" and the "most niu Secretary" in China (roughly translates to "most kick-ass Secretary"). In the face of national criticism, Li returned to work with a lower profile, generally avoided the media, and was given less 'face time' in local television stations. Li reputedly held his subordinates to very high standards. According to one local official, Li told them, "I work ten hours a day, you all should be working 16 hours a day. If you don't like it, then leave." The local official also said that Li called meetings on demand, and subordinates were expected to simply show up regardless of which hour of the day it was. The turnover of local government staff was high; Li routinely shuffled his rank and file. Li reportedly had say in the transfer and promotion of even ordinary office staff.

Li's supporters point to his various achievements in Pizhou. They assert that Li presided over a time of almost uninterrupted economic growth in Pizhou, making the county stand out in relation to other counties in the relatively stagnant northern Jiangsu region. The county-level city quickly moved up the ranks in the province for its economic and social indicators, was the top-performing county-level jurisdiction in Xuzhou by "comprehensive indicators" (zonghe shili), and even entered the ranks of the "top 100 counties in China".

During Li's ten-year tenure in the city, his government reportedly spent some 12 million yuan (~$1.96 million) to hire a Peking University architecture professor to oversee the redesign of the entire city core. Within the city core, a large and elaborate government complex was constructed modeled on classical Chuyun Hanfeng (楚韵汉风) style architecture. The imposing and elaborate nature of the complex has elicited comparisons with Zhongnanhai, the residential compound of China's leaders. Li's government also spent some 70 million yuan ($11.42 million) for the Ruyi Avenue project, a giant axial thoroughfare through the city that was decorated with 9,999 lotus flowers, and reputed to be the longest Hanbaiyu (a form of alabaster) road in the world. A giant water fountain that could reach a height of 100 meters was also constructed. While some residents criticized these projects as needlessly extravagant, Li's supporters believed that the projects increased the prestige and image of Pizhou and played a role in attracting further investment into the city. They also asserted that these projects were mostly completed without much cost to the local taxpayer.

== Villagers violence incident ==
On January 7, 2010, local villagers were involved in a mass altercation during a protest against land surveyors who were surveying local farmland for development projects. The violence resulted in the death of one villager and the serious injury of another. Various city officials passed by the scene of the violence but reportedly did not intervene, and did not further address the issue. Both Li Lianyu and the mayor (second highest official) of Pizhou were removed from office as a result of the fallout from the scandal. Li, however, retained his position as Vice-Mayor of Xuzhou; his dismissal, in practice, meant that he would become a 'full-time' vice mayor working in Xuzhou. On April 11, a crowd that had earlier caught wind of Li's departure gathered at Li's office in an attempt to prevent him from leaving. The crowd consisted mainly of transient city contractors who were promised permanent positions in return for the city government's planned privatization of a formerly state-owned enterprise. They feared that if Li were to depart without bringing the matter to a close, they would soon lose their jobs and livelihoods. Li was able to get past the crowd and departed for Xuzhou shortly thereafter.

== Investigation ==
Li was transferred to the far west region of Xinjiang as part of an 'aid the frontier' campaign led by the Jiangsu provincial government. He served as the Deputy Party Secretary of the Ili Kazakh Autonomous Prefecture between August 2013 to September 2014.

In September 2014, a party disciplinary working group commissioned by Beijing was dispatched to Jiangsu to conduct anti-corruption work. The group reportedly received many complaints about Li Lianyu. Li was soon removed from office. On November 15, 2014, it was publicly announced that he would be undergoing investigation by the Central Commission for Discipline Inspection for "serious violations of laws and regulations".

On February 15, 2017, he was expelled from the Chinese Communist Party (CCP) and removed from public office. On August 11, he received a sentence of 8 years in prison and fine of 300,000 yuan for taking bribes and abusing his power by the Yangzhou Intermediate People's Court. All his illegal gains will be confiscated and handed over to the State.
