= Lady Xu (Eastern Wu) =

2nd-century Chinese noble woman

Lady Xu 徐氏
- Born: 2nd century
- Died: 3rd century
- Other names: Xushi
- Occupation: Noblewoman
- Spouse: Sun Yi
- Children: Sun Song

Lady Xu (徐氏, 2nd century) was a Chinese noble woman during the late Eastern Han Dynasty to the Three Kingdoms period. She was married to Sun Yi, who was the brother of Sun Quan, the founder of the Eastern Wu state. She was also the mother of Sun Song. Her true name has been lost to history. Lady Xu was known for her beauty and skill in I Ching, a divination technique. She created a plan and secretly conspired with other generals to ambush and kill her husband's assassins, killing them one by one. Her deeds made her honored and admired throughout the empire.

She was acclaimed as a woman of courage and loyalty, devoted to her family and sovereign amidst the escalating desertions and betrayals of the chaotic period preceding the formation of the Three Kingdoms; orchestrating the execution of traitors while simultaneously safeguarding the territory of the Sun clan against the traitors' attempt to deliver it to a rival warlord.

== Biography ==
In 204, officials from various counties in Danyang County gathered to meet Sun Yi. Sun Yi asked his wife, Lady Xu, to perform divination for him regarding the banquet. Lady Xu warned him that the divination was unfavorable and advised him to postpone the banquet. However, Sun Yi, feeling that the officials had been waiting for a long time, decided to proceed with the banquet. Normally, Sun Yi would carry a sword with him, but due to his drunken state, he was unarmed, providing an opportunity for Bian Hong to assassinate him. Amidst the chaos, Bian Hong fled to the mountains but was later captured by Lady Xu's pursuit. Gui Lan and Dai Yuan, complicit in Sun Yi's murder, shifted blame onto Bian Hong, whom they publicly executed as the scapegoat. Meanwhile, they seized control of Sun Yi's household and assets.

Following Sun Yi's death, Sun He, a relative of Sun Quan's family, arrived in Wanling County, the capital of Danyang Commandery, seeking to restore order. He held Gui Lan and Dai Yuan responsible for Sun Yi's murder but struggled to assert control over the commandery's military forces. Fearing further repercussions, Gui Lan and Dai Yuan conspired to eliminate Sun He, recognizing the potential threat posed by Sun Quan's direct involvement in the investigation. Subsequently, they dispatched a messenger to Liu Fu, the Inspector of Yang Province, expressing their readiness to defect to his side.

Despite knowledge of Gui Lan and Dai Yuan's betrayal, Sun Yi's officers were powerless to act due to their limited authority. Taking advantage of Sun Yi's absence, Gui Lan forcefully occupied Sun Yi's residence, claiming his concubines and attendants, including Lady Xu. Lady Xu, enduring humiliation, pretended to agree, stating that she needed time to mourn her husband properly before complying with Gui Lan's demands. She secretly contacted Sun Yi's trusted generals, Sun Gao and Fu Ying, and sought their help in avenging her husband's death.

Lady Xu tearfully implored Sun Gao and Fu Ying to assist her in killing Gui Lan, explaining the injustice done to her husband. Touched by her loyalty, they pledged their support. Together, they orchestrated a plan to eliminate Gui Lan and Dai Yuan. During a memorial ceremony for Sun Yi, Lady Xu feigned grief and later invited Gui Lan to her quarters. As Gui Lan entered, Lady Xu signaled Sun Gao and Fu Ying to attack, resulting in Gui Lan's death. Meanwhile, Xu Yuan and others outside killed Dai Yuan. Lady Xu's courage and strategic prowess earned the soldiers' admiration viewing it as miraculous when she honored her husband's grave with Gui Lan and Dai Yuan's heads. Within a day, Sun Quan arrived, witnessing Lady Xu's justice. He appointed Sun Gao and Fu Ying as key military officers, executed Gui Lan and Dai Yuan's remaining followers and allowed Lady Xu to retire peacefully. The people of Jiangdong praised Lady Xu's virtues.

== Family ==
=== Spouse ===
- Sun Yi

=== Children ===
- Sun Song

== In Romance of the Three Kingdoms ==
Lady Xu makes her debut in Chapter 38 of the novel, Romance of the Three Kingdoms, as a skilled diviner. She foresaw misfortune looming over Sun Yi and urged him to avoid the meeting with the local leaders of Danyang, to no avail. Ignoring her warnings, Sun Yi fell victim to Bian Hong's treachery after the banquet. Gai Lan and Dai Yuan, harboring disdain for Sun Yi, orchestrated the plot, using Bian Hong as a scapegoat before seizing Sun Yi's estate, including his concubines.

Captivated by Lady Xu's beauty, Gai Lan coveted her for himself. Agreeing to marry him after a month of mourning, Lady Xu instead used the time to conspire with Sun Gao and Fu Ying, loyal to Sun Yi. When Gai Lan returned, Lady Xu deceived him into a false sense of security with a feast and wine. As he succumbed to drunkenness, the hidden officers emerged, assassinating Gai Lan. Dai Yuan met a similar fate when invited to dine at Lady Xu's home, where the officers executed him as well.

With her adversaries eliminated, Lady Xu returned to mourning attire, presenting Gai Lan and Dai Yuan's heads at her husband's coffin. Despite shock in Danyang, Sun Quan rewarded Sun Gao and Fu Ying for their loyalty and took Lady Xu under his protection. A poem extolling her bravery was composed:

Full of resource and virtuous, few in the world are like her,

Guilefully wrought she and compassed the death of the lusty assassins,

Faithful servants are always ready to deal with rebellion,

None can ever excel that heroine famous in Wu.

== Appraisal ==
In later generations, poems lauded her deeds. "The wife of Sun Yi, with her ability to protect herself and courage to avenge her husband's enemies, stands unparalleled in history." These lines aptly depict Lady Xu's exemplary virtues and intelligence. Faced with the threat of her husband's murderers, she remained composed and ultimately devised a plan for vengeance, earning her the title of an exemplary and heroic woman. Thus, the people of Jiangdong held Lady Xu in high esteem, as reflected in the verse: "Rare is the individual who possesses both talent and integrity, yet when confronted with treachery, they can be brought to ruin in an instant. Mediocre officials may betray their lords, loyal ministers may meet their end, but none can compare to the women of Eastern Wu in their loyalty.

== Sources ==
- Records of the Three Kingdoms, Book of Wu, Genealogy of the Imperial Family
