= Sun Yi =

Han dynasty general (184-204)

- 孫翊

Administrator of Danyang (丹楊太守) (under Sun Quan)
- In office 204
- Monarch: Emperor Xian of Han
- Preceded by: Wu Jing

Personal details
- Born: c. 184
- Died: 204 (aged 20)
- Spouse: Lady Xu
- Children: Sun Song
- Parents: Sun Jian (father); Empress Wulie (mother)
- Relatives: See Eastern Wu family trees
- Occupation: General, politician
- Courtesy name: Shubi (叔弼)
- Other name: Sun Yan (孫儼)

Sun Yi (c. 184–204), courtesy name Shubi, was Chinese military general and politician. He was a younger brother of Sun Quan, the founding emperor of the Eastern Wu dynasty in the Three Kingdoms period of China. He was the husband of Lady Xu.

== Life ==
Sun Yi was the third son of the warlord Sun Jian and his wife Lady Wu; he had a younger full brother, Sun Kuang. He was known for his martial valour and fiery personality, which made him resemble his eldest brother Sun Ce. He was nominated as a xiaolian (civil service candidate) by Zhu Zhi and served in the office of the Minister of Works. After Sun Jian was killed in action at the Battle of Xiangyang in 191, Sun Ce succeeded him and took over command of his troops. Between 194 and 199, Sun Ce launched a series of conquests in the Jiangdong region and established his power base there. In 200 CE, when Sun Ce was mortally wounded during a hunting expedition, his adviser Zhang Zhao and other subjects believed that he would designate Sun Yi as his successor, but Sun Ce chose his second brother Sun Quan instead.

In 202, Sun Quan killed Sheng Xian, the Administrator (太守) of Wu Commandery. Some of Sheng Xian's associates and protégés went into hiding in the mountainous areas of Jiangdong. In the following year, Wu Jing, the maternal uncle of Sun Quan and his brothers, died in office while serving as the Administrator of Danyang Commandery (丹楊郡). Sun Yi, who was 19 years old then and held the rank of a Lieutenant-General (偏將軍), was appointed as the new Administrator of Danyang. Danyang was adjacent to Wu Commandery, so Sun Yi reached out to some of the disgruntled followers of Sheng Xian, enticing them to Danyang and offering them positions in the Danyang administration in order to stabilise the region. Two of these men, Gui Lan (媯覽) and Dai Yuan (戴員) came to work for Sun Yi. Dai Yuan was appointed as a Civil Assistant (郡丞) while Gui Lan was given a high military command with the slightly irregular title "Grand Chief Controller" (大都督).

Gui Lan and Dai Yuan were still dissatisfied and they harboured the intention of rebelling. They forged close ties with Bian Hong (邊鴻, also rendered 邊洪), an aide of Sun Yi. Once, when Sun Quan was away on a campaign, they took advantage of the situation to set their plans into motion. At the time, the various chiefs of the counties in Danyang were scheduled to meet Sun Yi in the commandery capital. Before the meeting, Sun Yi asked his wife, Lady Xu (徐氏), who was versed in divination, to predict the events of the meeting. Lady Xu predicted ill luck and advised her husband to postpone the meeting, but Sun Yi wanted to settle the meeting quickly because the Chiefs had been waiting for some time since they arrived, so he hosted a banquet for them. Sun Yi often carried a sword with him when he travelled around, but he became tipsy after the feast so he was unarmed when he saw the guests off. Just then, Bian Hong attacked him from behind. The scene was thrown into disarray and no one came to Sun Yi's rescue so Sun died at the hands of Bian Hong. Bian Hong escaped to the hills after murdering Sun Yi, but was later killed by Gui Lan and Dai Yuan.

== Post-mortem events ==
After Sun Yi's death, Sun He (孫河), a relative of Sun Quan's family, came to Wanling County (宛陵縣; present-day Xuancheng, Anhui), the capital of Danyang Commandery, to restore order. He blamed Gui Lan and Dai Yuan for Sun Yi's murder but was unable to exert control over the military forces in the commandery. Gui Lan and Dai Yuan became worried because Sun He, who had no blood relations with Sun Yi, was already so upset over Sun Yi's death. They believed that they would be in deeper trouble if Sun Quan (Sun Yi's brother) personally came to Danyang to pursue the matter, so they murdered Sun He as well. They then sent a messenger to Liu Fu, the Inspector (刺史) of Yang Province, and expressed their willingness to defect to Liu's side.

The other officers in Danyang were well aware that Gui Lan and Dai Yuan were the masterminds behind Sun Yi's murder but were unable to take action against the two men because their powers were limited. Gui Lan took over Sun Yi's residence and seized Sun's concubines and servants for himself. When he wanted to take Lady Xu (Sun Yi's widow), she declined, said that it was too soon after her husband's death to remarry, and told him to wait for a month. During the intervening period, Lady Xu secretly contacted Sun Gao (孫高), Fu Ying (傅嬰) and other former subordinates of Sun Yi, informed them of the circumstances, and plotted with them to avenge her husband. On the appointed day, Lady Xu changed out of her mourning garments and invited Gui Lan to her personal quarters, where Sun Gao and Fu Ying, in disguise as maids, ambushed and killed Gui Lan while the others slew Dai Yuan. Gui Lan and Dai Yuan's heads were cut off and offered as propitiation at Sun Yi's altar. This incident shocked everyone in Danyang. Shortly thereafter, Sun Quan came to Danyang to reward those who remained loyal to Sun Yi and punish those who conspired with Gui Lan and Dai Yuan.

== Family and descendants ==
Sun Yi's son, Sun Song (孫松), served as a Colonel of Trainee Archers (射聲校尉) and was made a Marquis of a Chief District (都鄉侯). Sun Song was known for being a gregarious and generous person and was the closest to Sun Quan among all of Sun Quan's younger male relatives. When Sun Song was stationed in Baqiu (巴丘), he was often reprimanded by Lu Xun, a senior Wu general and minister, for not maintaining good discipline in his unit and allowing his men to fool around. On one occasion, Lu Xun punished Sun Song's subordinates by ordering their heads to be shaved. Sun Song died in 231.

== See also ==
- Lists of people of the Three Kingdoms
