= Guan Zhaozhi =

Chinese mathematician

Guan Zhaozhi (Chinese: 关肇直; February 13, 1919 – November 12, 1982) was a Chinese mathematician. He was a member of the Chinese Academy of Sciences.

In 1962, Guan and Song Jian were recruited by Qian Xuesen to establish China's first cybernetics laboratory with him.

== Personal life ==
His younger male cousin Guan Zhaoye was an architect and member of the Chinese Academy of Engineering (CAE).
