= Sihu, Jiangsu =

Sihu 四户镇
- Town
- Location in Jiangsu
- Coordinates: 34°37′45″N 117°58′8″E
- Country: People's Republic of China
- Province: Jiangsu
- Prefecture-level city: Xuzhou
- County-level city: Pizhou
- Time zone: UTC+8 (China Standard)

Sihu (Chinese: 四户; pinyin: Sìhù) is a town in Pizhou, Jiangsu province, China. As of 2020, it has 17 villages under its administration:

- Sihu Village
- Gaobanqiao Village (高板桥村)
- Duzhuang Village (杜庄村)
- Guqiao Village (顾桥村)
- Zhaobu Village (找埠村)
- Xiadun Village (夏墩村)
- Zhaojia Village (赵家村)
- Lijia Village (栗家村)
- Daokou Village (道口村)
- Zhuyuan Village (竹园村)
- Baimasi Village (白马寺村)
- Fenghuangzhuang Village (凤凰庄村)
- Gouya Village (沟涯村)
- Gangzi Village (岗子村)
- Beitaoyuan Village (北桃园村)
- Shiyang Village (石羊村)
- Dongtang Village (董塘村)

== See also ==
- List of township-level divisions of Jiangsu
