= Zhaodun Township =

Zhaodun Township 赵墩乡
- Township
- Location in Gansu
- Coordinates: 35°21′51″N 105°56′31″E
- Country: People's Republic of China
- Province: Gansu
- Prefecture-level city: Pingliang
- County: Zhuanglang County
- Time zone: UTC+8 (China Standard)

Zhaodun Township (simplified Chinese: 赵墩乡; traditional Chinese: 趙墩鄉; pinyin: Zhàodūn Xiāng) is a township under the administration of Zhuanglang County, Gansu, China. As of 2020, it has thirteen villages under its administration:

- Zhaodun Village
- Dazhuang Village (大庄村)
- Jinggou Village (井沟村)
- Yangchuan Village (阳川村)
- Sunmiao Village (孙庙村)
- Jiaosi Village (蛟寺村)
- Jiaozhang Village (蛟掌村)
- Liwan Village (梨湾村)
- Peipu Village (裴堡村)
- Shizui Village (石咀村)
- Guandao Village (关道村)
- Wangpu Village (王堡村)
- Mudan Village (牡丹村)
