= Courtesy name =

Name given to adults in East Asia

Courtesy name (Zi)
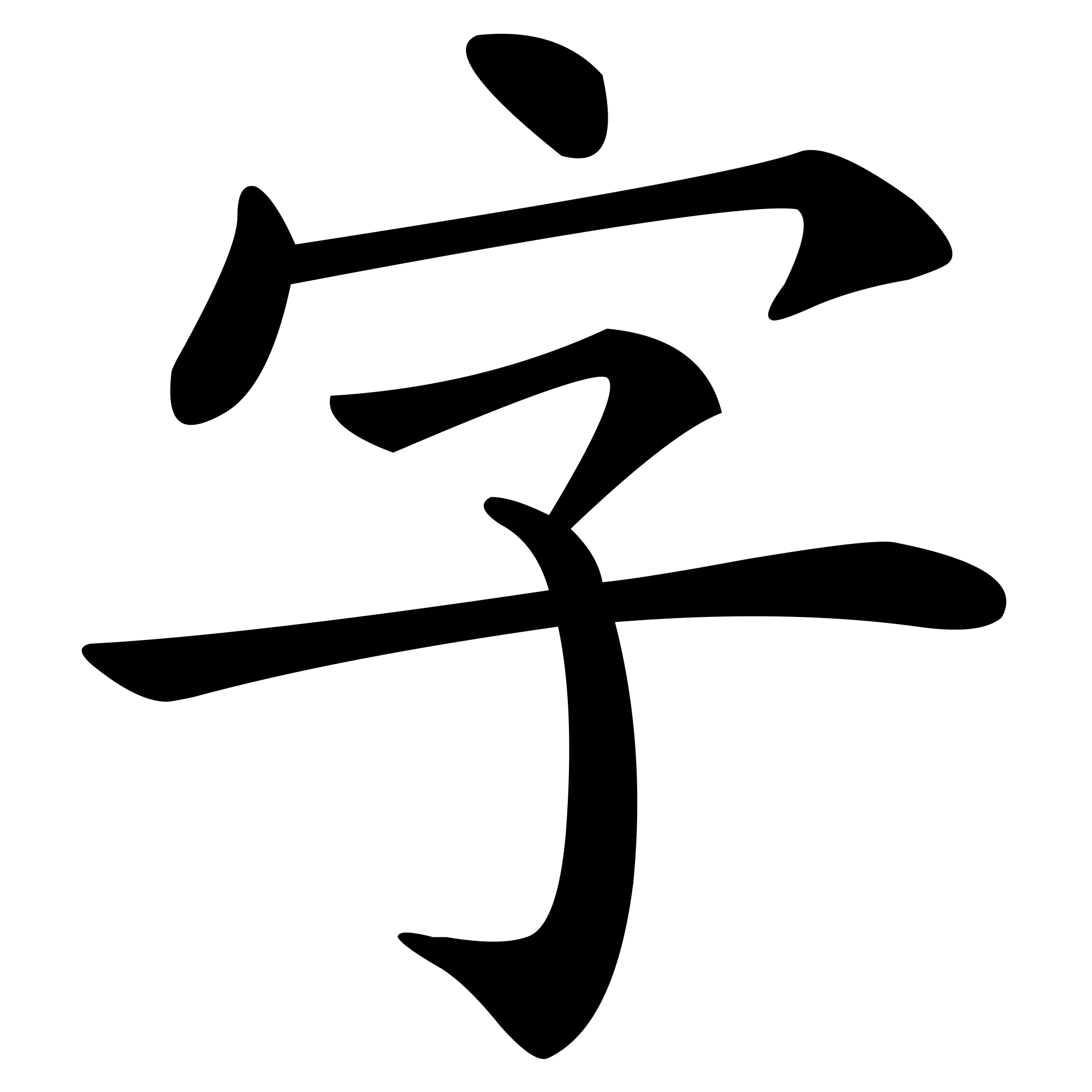

Chinese name
- Traditional Chinese: (表) 字
- Hanyu Pinyin: (biǎo) zì
- Wade–Giles: (piao)-tzu

Vietnamese name
- Vietnamese alphabet: biểu tự tên tự tên chữ
- Chữ Hán: 表字
- Chữ Nôm: 𠸜字 𠸜𡨸

Korean name
- Hangul: 자
- Hanja: 字
- Revised Romanization: ja
- McCune–Reischauer: cha

Japanese name
- Kanji: 字
- Hiragana: あざな
- Revised Hepburn: azana

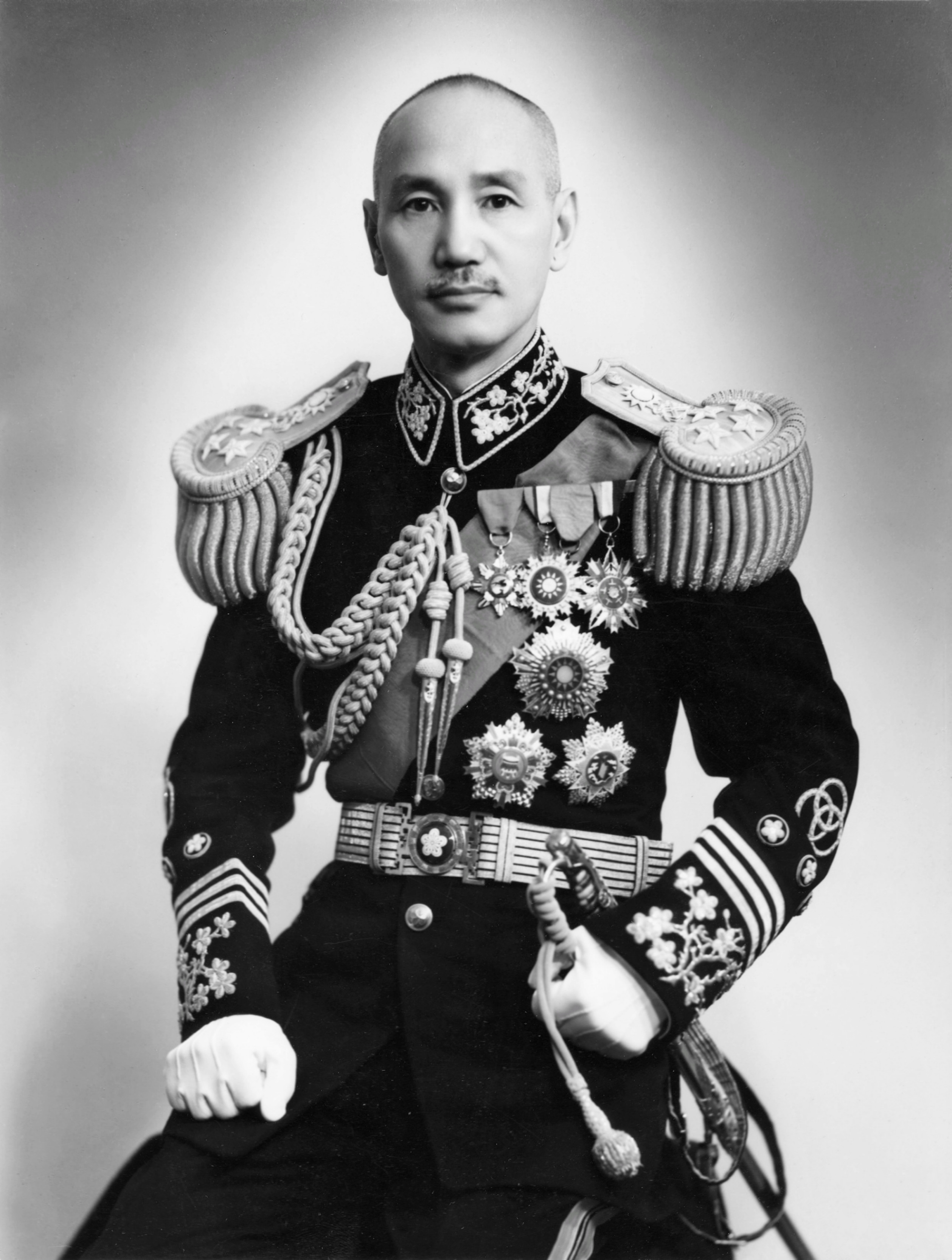
Chiang Kai-shek is known both in the West and Sinosphere by his courtesy name "Kai-shek" (介石) rather than his given name "Chung-cheng" (中正)

A courtesy name (Chinese: 字; pinyin: zì; lit. 'character') is a name bestowed upon a person at adulthood in addition to their given name. This tradition is prevalent in the East Asian cultural sphere, particularly in China, Japan, Korea, Taiwan and Vietnam.

A courtesy name is not to be confused with an art name, another frequently mentioned term for an alternative name in East Asia, which is closer to the concept of a pen name or a pseudonym.

== Usage ==
A courtesy name is a name traditionally given to Chinese men at the age of 20 sui, marking their coming of age. It was sometimes given to women, usually upon marriage. The practice is no longer common in modern Chinese society. According to the Book of Rites, after a man reached adulthood, it was disrespectful for others of the same generation to address him by his given name. Thus, the given name was reserved for oneself and one's elders, whereas the courtesy name would be used by adults of the same generation to refer to one another on formal occasions or in writing. Another translation of zi occasionally encountered is the "style name", but this translation has been criticised as misleading since it could imply an official or legal title and is more often used for the hao or art name.

Generally speaking, courtesy names before the Qin dynasty were one syllable, and from the Qin to the 20th century they were mostly disyllabic, consisting of two Chinese characters. Courtesy names were often relative to the meaning of the person's given name; the relationship could be synonyms, relative affairs, or rarely but sometimes antonym. For example, Chiang Kai-shek's given name (中正, romanized as Chung-cheng) and courtesy name (介石, romanized as Kai-shek) are both from the yù (豫) hexagram 16 of I Ching.

Another way to form a courtesy name is to use the homophonic character zi (子) – a respectful title for a man – as the first character of the disyllabic courtesy name. Thus, for example, Gongsun Qiao's courtesy name was Zichan (子產), and Du Fu's was Zimei (子美). It was also common to construct a courtesy name by using as the first character one which expresses the bearer's birth order among male siblings in his family. Thus Confucius, whose name was Kong Qiu (孔丘), was given the courtesy name Zhongni (仲尼), where the first character zhong indicates that he was the second son born into his family. The characters commonly used are bo (伯) for the first, zhong (仲) for the second, shu (叔) for the third, and ji (季) typically for the youngest, if the family consists of more than three sons. General Sun Jian's four sons, for instance, were Sun Ce (伯符, Bófú), Sun Quan (仲謀, Zhòngmóu), Sun Yi (叔弼, Shūbì) and Sun Kuang (季佐, Jìzuǒ).

Reflecting a general cultural tendency to regard names as significant, the choice of what name to bestow upon one's children was considered very important in traditional China. Yan Zhitui of the Northern Qi dynasty asserted that whereas the purpose of a given name was to distinguish one person from another, a courtesy name should express the bearer's moral integrity.

Prior to the twentieth century, sinicized Koreans, Vietnamese, and Japanese were also referred to by their courtesy name. The practice was also adopted by some Mongols and Manchus after the Qing conquest of China.

== Examples ==
Common name	Family name	Given name	Courtesy name
Chinese
Lǎozǐ 老子	Lǐ 李	Ěr 耳	Bóyáng 伯陽
Kǒngzǐ (Confucius) 孔子	Kǒng 孔	Qiū 丘	Zhòngní 仲尼
Sūnzǐ (Sun Tzu) 孫子	Sūn 孫	Wǔ 武	Chángqīng 長卿
Cáo Cāo 曹操	Cáo 曹	Cāo 操	Mèngdé 孟德
Sūn Quán 孫權	Sūn 孫	Quán 權	Zhòngmóu 仲謀
Guān Yǔ 關羽	Guān 關	Yǔ 羽	Yúncháng 雲長
Liú Bèi 劉備	Liú 劉	Bèi 備	Xuándé 玄德
Zhūgé Liàng 諸葛亮	Zhūgé 諸葛	Liàng 亮	Kǒngmíng 孔明
Zhào Yún 趙雲	Zhào 趙	Yún 雲	Zǐlóng 子龍
Lǐ Bái 李白	Lǐ 李	Bái 白	Tàibái 太白
Sū Dōngpō 蘇東坡	Sū 蘇	Shì 軾	Zǐzhān 子瞻
Bāo Zhěng 包拯	Bāo 包	Zhěng 拯	Xīrén 希仁
Yuè Fēi 岳飛	Yuè 岳	Fēi 飛	Péngjǔ 鵬舉
Yuán Chónghuàn 袁崇煥	Yuán 袁	Chónghuàn 崇煥	Yuánsù 元素
Liú Jī 劉基	Liú 劉	Jī 基	Bówēn 伯溫
Táng Yín 唐寅	Táng 唐	Yín 寅	Bóhǔ 伯虎
Sūn Zhōngshān (Sun Yat-sen) 孫中山	Sūn 孫	Démíng 德明; Wén 文	Zàizhī 載之
Jiǎng Jièshí (Chiang Kai-shek) 蔣介石	Jiǎng 蔣	Zhōutài 周泰; Zhōngzhèng 中正	Jièshí 介石
Máo Zédōng 毛澤東	Máo 毛	Zédōng 澤東	Rùnzhī 潤之
Korean
I Sunsin 李舜臣	I 李	Sunsin 舜臣	Yeohae 汝諧
Yun Po-sun 尹潽善	Yun 尹	Posun 潽善	Gyeongcheon 敬天
Japanese
Tokugawa Yoshinobu 德川慶喜	Tokugawa 德川	Yoshinobu 慶喜	Shihō 子邦
Itō Hirobumi 伊藤博文	Itō 伊藤	Hirobumi 博文	Shunsuke 俊輔
Vietnamnese
Lê Quý Đôn 黎貴惇	Lê 黎	Quý Đôn 貴惇	Doãn Hậu 允厚
Lý Thường Kiệt 李常傑	Lý 李	Tuấn 俊	Thường Kiệt 常傑

== See also ==
- Cognomen, the third name of a citizen of ancient Rome
