= Sun Zhong =

Sun Zhong (孫忠, unknown) was a prominent Song merchant active between China and Japan during the Xining through Yuanfeng eras of the Northern Song (1065–1085, roughly corresponding to the Jiryaku to Ōtoku eras in Japan). At a time when Song and Japan lacked formal diplomatic relations, Sun Zhong frequently crossed the East China Sea. He not only engaged in private cross-border trade but also took on duties such as transmitting political documents, transporting religious personnel, and conducting semi-official diplomatic negotiations. He was a representative figure in eleventh-century Sino-Japanese economic and cultural exchange.

== Life and Major Activities ==
Over the twenty years from 1065 to 1085, historical sources explicitly record as many as seven round trips by Sun Zhong between China and Japan. Japan then enforced strict entry controls at Dazaifu, and Sun Zhong repeatedly faced the risk of forced repatriation. During his stays in Japan, he repeatedly pursued litigation to defend his rights, actively protecting the lawful trading rights and interests of Song merchants.

In Enkyū 4 (1072, the fifth year of Xining in the Song), the Japanese Tendai monk Jōjin and his disciples, seeking to make a pilgrimage to China, secretly departed from Hizen Province aboard Song merchant ships, including those of Sun Zhong and others, and safely reached Mingzhou in Song.

In the sixth year of Xining (1073), Jōjin's disciple Raien and others took Sun Zhong's ship home, carrying with them Emperor Shenzong of Song's autograph document and gifts for Japan. In the first year of Yuanfeng (1078), Sun Zhong, entrusted by Emperor Shenzong, served as a "Local Products Envoy"(方物使) and took to Japan a Song official dispatch and gifts "bestowed upon Fujiwara no Tsunehira(藤原經平) of the Dazaifu of Japan." Because of his status as a commoner merchant, the Japanese court had doubts about him on behalf of Song, and negotiations and discussions dragged on for several years.

Between 1080 and 1082, Sun Zhong ultimately helped the Japanese court carry its reply dispatch to the Mingzhou authorities back to Song, bringing about a de facto exchange of documents between China and Japan.

Because Sun Zhong had remained in Japan for a long time without returning, Emperor Shenzong specially sent the state envoy Huang Feng(黄逢) to Japan to search for Sun Zhong. Against the backdrop of the absence of formal diplomatic relations between Song and Japan, the court's special dispatch of a state envoy to find a private merchant was extremely rare in history.

== Historical Assessment ==
As a commoner merchant, Sun Zhong formed an important link in Song-Japanese exchange during the mid-to-late Northern Song. He broke through the limitations imposed by the severance of official diplomacy between the two countries. He not only maintained the circulation of goods along the Maritime Silk Road but also objectively acted as a "people's ambassador," promoting covert contacts between the two governments and the cross-border spread of Buddhist culture.
