= Yuan Hong (historian) =

4th-century Eastern Jin historian, official and calligrapher

Yuan Hong (Chinese: 袁宏; Wade–Giles: Yüan Hung, 328?–376? (Note: According to Yuan Hong's biography in Book of Jin, he died aged 49 (by East Asian reckoning) during the early part of the Taiyuan era (376-396) of Sima Yao's reign. By calculation, his birth year should be 328 or after.)), courtesy name Yanbo (彦伯), was a scholar, historian and politician from the Eastern Jin. He was born in Zhoukou, Henan, and served as an advisor to generals Xie Shang and Huan Wen on a number of military campaigns. He was also a descendant of Yuan Huan.

While on one of the latter general's campaigns, Yuan was asked to compose an official document. While leaning against his horse, he managed to complete seven pages, which led to the chengyu yǐmǎkědài (traditional Chinese: 倚馬可待; simplified Chinese: 倚马可待).

Yuan is best known for his literary works, especially the Annals of the Later Han, which served as the basis for the more famous Book of Later Han by Fan Ye. An original collection of works by him, in thirty volumes, is no longer extant. Around twenty poems and essays have been preserved.

Politically, Yuan Hong was against Huan Wen usurping the throne. In 373, when Huan was gravely ill and craved to be given the Nine bestowments, (Note: Being granted the nine bestowments was often seen as the prelude to usurpation.) Yuan worked together with Xie An (Note: Xie Shang's cousin), Wang Tanzhi and Wang Biaozhi (王彪之) to delay the bestowment. (Note: Due to his literary prowess and calligraphy, Yuan was assigned to draft the edict.) Huan died in August that year without receiving the bestowments.

== Anecdotes ==
Yuan Hong was serving under Huan when he composed the Dong Zheng Fu (东征赋), which commemorated many northerners who came south to join the Eastern Jin court. However, the poem did not mention Huan's father Huan Yi. Yuan's friend, Fu Tao (伏滔), who was also under Huan, urged Yuan to include Huan Yi; Yuan merely smiled and did not reply. When Huan Wen knew of the omission, he was angry but due to Yuan's literary reputation, Huan did not want to question Yuan openly. One day, Huan Wen went on a boat trip and ordered Yuan to come along. Many who were on the boat trip were fearful for Yuan. After sailing several li, Huan then asked Yuan, "I heard that you composed the Dong Zheng Fu and praised many pioneers; why leave out my father?" Yuan replied, "I was thinking about how to properly address your father. Since I haven't reached a decision, I didn't dare to reveal what I have written." Huan, still suspicious that Yuan wasn't truthful, then asked, "What were you planning to write?" Yuan's reply moved Huan to tears. (Note: The Dong Zheng Fu also did not mention Tao Kan; armed with a blade, Tao Kan's son Tao Fan (childhood name Hunu) confronted Yuan in a confined chamber over this. On the spot, Yuan gave Tao a satisfactory reply.)

== See also ==
- Book of Later Han
