= Zhaodun, Jiangsu =

Zhaodun 赵墩镇
- Town
- Location in Jiangsu
- Coordinates: 34°18′14″N 117°51′14″E
- Country: People's Republic of China
- Province: Jiangsu
- Prefecture-level city: Xuzhou
- County-level city: Pizhou
- Time zone: UTC+8 (China Standard)

Zhaodun (simplified Chinese: 赵墩; traditional Chinese: 趙墩; pinyin: Zhàodūn) is a town under the administration of Pizhou, Jiangsu, China. As of 2020, it administers Yanpu (闫家) Residential Neighborhood and the following 27 villages:

- Zhaodun Village
- Guokou Village (郭口村)
- Penghu Village (彭湖村)
- Qianliu Village (前刘村)
- Zhongliu Village (中刘村)
- Maohu Village (毛湖村)
- Guohe Village (过河村)
- Xingtang Village (兴唐村)
- Gengting Village (更厅村)
- Tianmiao Village (天庙村)
- Zhangzhuang Village (张庄村)
- Chenghe Village (城河村)
- Henglou Village (衡楼村)
- Tandong Village (滩东村)
- Tanxi Village (滩西村)
- Xipaifang Village (西牌坊村)
- Guzhuang Village (顾庄村)
- Hujia Village (胡家村)
- Hewan Village (河湾村)
- Niqiao Village (倪桥村)
- Yihe Village (义合村)
- Zhaihe Village (寨河村)
- Guzi Village (崮子村)
- Liuyuan Village (柳园村)
- Shaji Village (沙集村)
- Liutai Village (刘台村)
- Gengbu Village (耿埠村)
