= Annals of the Later Han =

- Author: Yuan Hong
- Original title: Hou Hanji
- Translator: 後漢紀
- Language: Chinese
- Discipline: Historical
- No. of books: 30

Annals of the Later Han or Hou Hanji (後漢紀) is a Chinese history book of the Eastern Han dynasty. It was written by Yuan Hong (328–376) during the Jin dynasty (266–420). Yuan spent eight years to complete his Annals. The annals contain 30 books with some 210,000 Chinese characters. It covers the period from the farmers' revolts of the later years of Wang Mang to the years when Cao Pi, and Liu Bei became emperors; therefore it covers roughly 200 years. The annals were written 50 years earlier than Fan Ye's Book of the Later Han, and it is one of two surviving history books of Eastern Han dynasty.

== Contents ==
- Book 1 光武皇帝 Emperor Guangwu
- Book 2 光武皇帝
- Book 3 光武皇帝
- Book 4 光武皇帝
- Book 5 光武皇帝
- Book 6 光武皇帝
- Book 7 光武皇帝
- Book 8 光武皇帝
- Book 9 孝明皇帝 (1/2) Emperor Ming
- Book 10 孝明皇帝 (2/2)
- Book 11 孝章皇帝 (1/2) Emperor Zhang
- Book 12 孝章皇帝 (2/2)
- Book 13 孝和皇帝 (1/2) Emperor He
- Book 14 孝和皇帝 (2/2)
- Book 15 孝殤皇帝 Emperor Shang
- Book 16 孝安皇帝 (1/2) Emperor An
- Book 17 孝安皇帝 (2/2)
- Book 18 孝順皇帝 (1/2) Emperor Shun
- Book 19 孝順皇帝 (2/2)
- Book 20 孝質皇帝 Emperor Zhi
- Book 21 孝桓皇帝 (1/2) Emperor Huan
- Book 22 孝桓皇帝 (2/2)
- Book 23 孝靈皇帝 (1/3) Emperor Ling
- Book 24 孝靈皇帝 (2/3)
- Book 25 孝靈皇帝 (3/3)
- Book 26 孝獻皇帝 Emperor Xian
- Book 27 孝獻皇帝
- Book 28 孝獻皇帝
- Book 29 孝獻皇帝
- Book 30 孝獻皇帝
