= Tushan, Jiangsu =

Tushan 土山镇
- Town
- Location in Jiangsu
- Coordinates: 34°13′29″N 117°50′8″E
- Country: People's Republic of China
- Province: Jiangsu
- Prefecture-level city: Xuzhou
- County-level city: Pizhou
- Time zone: UTC+8 (China Standard)

Tushan (Chinese: 土山; pinyin: Tǔshān) is a town under the administration of Pizhou, Jiangsu, China. As of 2023, it administers the following 21 villages:

- Jiebei Village (街北村)
- Jienan Village (街南村)
- Huangshan Village (黄山村)
- Wuzhuang Village (吴庄村)
- Zhangsong Village (张宋村)
- Songxu Village (宋圩村)
- Suzhuang Village (苏庄村)
- Niege Village (聂阁村)
- Sunzhuang Village (孙庄村)
- Liujing Village (刘井村)
- Xueji Village (薛集村)
- Lizhuang Village (李庄村)
- Jiahe Village (夹河村)
- Lütai Village (吕台村)
- Chenli Village (陈李村)
- Loulou Village (娄楼村)
- Luzhuang Village (卢庄村)
- Caolou Village (曹楼村)
- Weizhuang Village (魏庄村)
- Xuezhuang Village (薛庄村)
- Hexi Village (河西村)
