= Pizhou =

Pizhou 邳州市
- County-level city
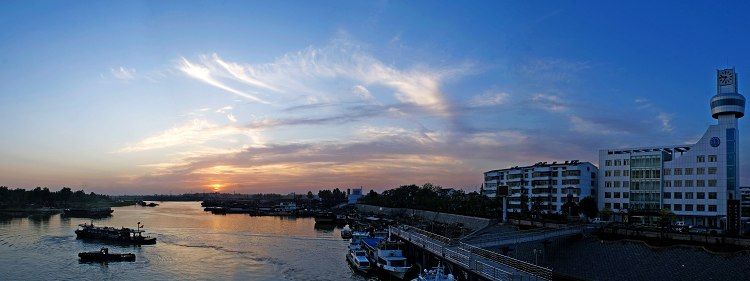
- View of the Grand Canal of China in Pizhou

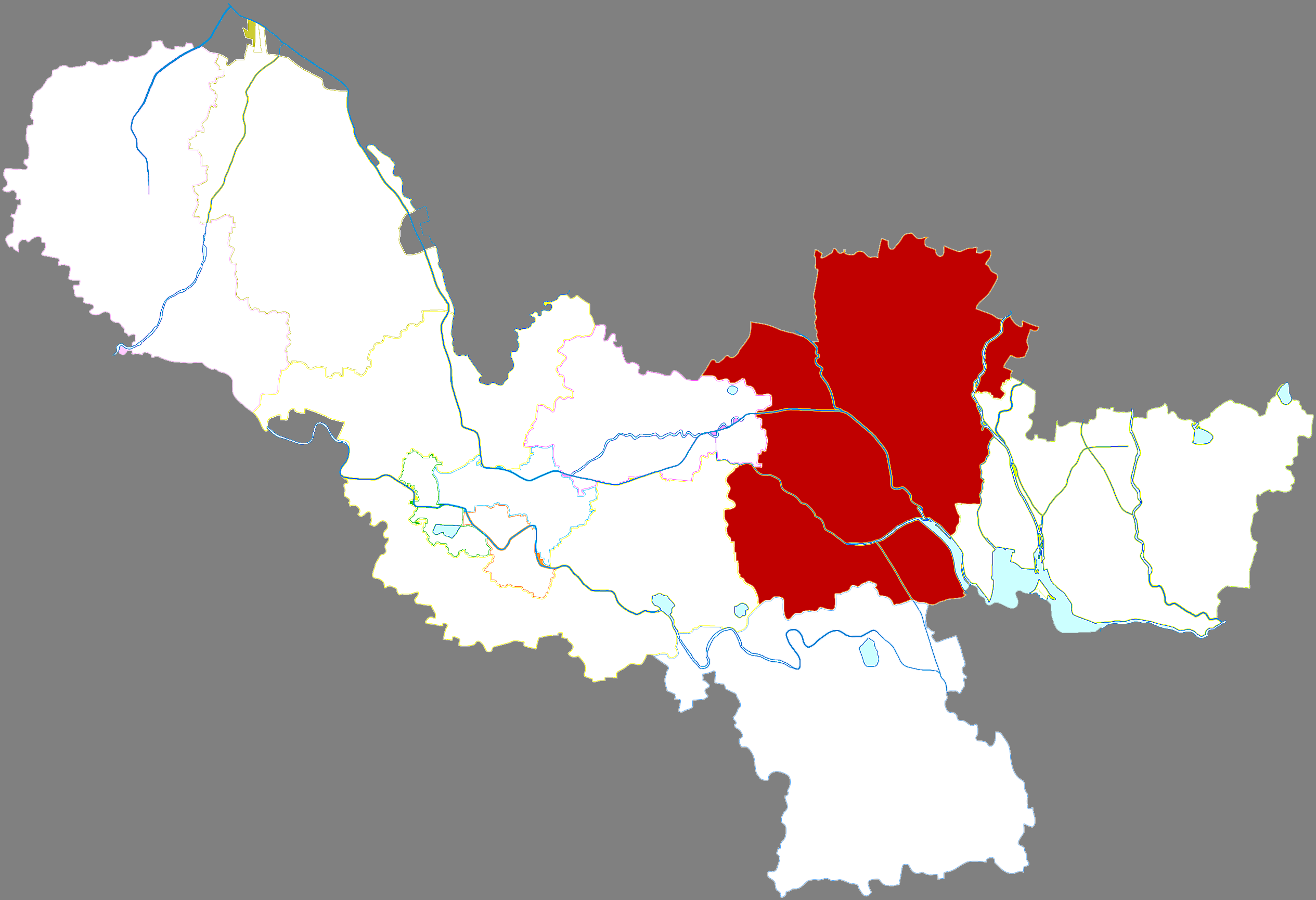
- Location in Xuzhou

- Location in Jiangsu
- Coordinates: 34°23′53″N 117°53′24″E
- Country: People's Republic of China
- Province: Jiangsu
- Prefecture-level city: Xuzhou

Area
  - County-level city: 2,088 km^{2} (806 sq mi)
  - Urban: 80 km^{2} (31 sq mi)

Population (2020 census)
  - County-level city: 1,462,563
  - Density: 700.5/km^{2} (1,814/sq mi)
  - Urban: 850,815
- Time zone: UTC+8 (China Standard)
- Postal Code: 221300
- Website: www.pz.gov.cn

Pizhou (Chinese: 邳州; pinyin: Pīzhōu) is a county-level city under the administration of Xuzhou, Jiangsu province, China. As of 2020 it had a population of 1,462,563; it borders the Shandong prefecture-level cities of Linyi to the northeast and Zaozhuang to the northwest.

== History ==
The city was formerly called Pi County (邳县; 邳縣), and before that, Xiapi (下邳) which was at one time the capital of the Zhou dynasty (1046–256 BCE) vassal State of Pi. During the Han dynasty (206 BCE–220 CE), Pi was a famous city. At the time of the Eastern Han and Three Kingdoms period, the city is known for the battle between warlords Lü Bu and Cao Cao fought there. It is the location Lü Bu retreated to when under siege by Cao Cao at Xiaopei. He first moved his family there and then he himself after being advised by Chen Gong. It was here that Lü Bu was ultimately defeated at the Battle of Xiapi.

During World War II, the Battle of Taierzhuang took place in Tengzhou. In the Chinese Civil War, it was the scene of the Huaihai Campaign. The area is relatively impoverished when compared to the rest of Jiangsu Province. In October 2007, when its party secretary Li Lianyu returned as a delegate from the 17th Party Congress, the entire city was mobilized to greet him in an unprecedented display, drawing immense criticism.

== Geography ==
Pizhou lies to the northeast of Xuzhou City at the intersection of the Grand Canal and Longhai Railway. To the north of Pizhou, there is the well-known Tai'erzhuang District of Zaozhuang City, Shandong Province.

Pizhou City is home to the longest Dawn redwood Metasequoia glyptostroboides avenue in the world. The avenue is approximately 60 km (37 mi) long with over one million trees.

== Climate ==
Climate data for Pizhou, elevation 26 m (85 ft), (1991–2020 normals, extremes 1981–present)
Month	Jan	Feb	Mar	Apr	May	Jun	Jul	Aug	Sep	Oct	Nov	Dec	Year
Record high °C (°F)	16.8 (62.2)	25.6 (78.1)	33.0 (91.4)	32.6 (90.7)	36.2 (97.2)	38.4 (101.1)	39.6 (103.3)	37.9 (100.2)	35.9 (96.6)	33.8 (92.8)	27.6 (81.7)	21.0 (69.8)	39.6 (103.3)
Mean daily maximum °C (°F)	5.5 (41.9)	8.8 (47.8)	14.3 (57.7)	20.9 (69.6)	26.0 (78.8)	29.8 (85.6)	31.2 (88.2)	30.6 (87.1)	26.9 (80.4)	21.8 (71.2)	14.4 (57.9)	7.7 (45.9)	19.8 (67.7)
Daily mean °C (°F)	0.6 (33.1)	3.5 (38.3)	8.8 (47.8)	15.2 (59.4)	20.6 (69.1)	24.7 (76.5)	27.2 (81.0)	26.4 (79.5)	22.0 (71.6)	16.1 (61.0)	9.1 (48.4)	2.6 (36.7)	14.7 (58.5)
Mean daily minimum °C (°F)	−3.0 (26.6)	−0.5 (31.1)	4.1 (39.4)	10.1 (50.2)	15.6 (60.1)	20.3 (68.5)	23.9 (75.0)	23.2 (73.8)	18.2 (64.8)	11.8 (53.2)	4.9 (40.8)	−1.1 (30.0)	10.6 (51.1)
Record low °C (°F)	−12.3 (9.9)	−17.0 (1.4)	−8.8 (16.2)	−0.8 (30.6)	4.1 (39.4)	11.5 (52.7)	16.2 (61.2)	13.5 (56.3)	7.2 (45.0)	−2.1 (28.2)	−7.3 (18.9)	−13.3 (8.1)	−17.0 (1.4)
Average precipitation mm (inches)	17.5 (0.69)	22.2 (0.87)	33.2 (1.31)	38.8 (1.53)	64.4 (2.54)	112.5 (4.43)	207.8 (8.18)	168.4 (6.63)	69.2 (2.72)	36.6 (1.44)	31.7 (1.25)	17.4 (0.69)	819.7 (32.28)
Average precipitation days (≥ 0.1 mm)	4.5	5.2	5.8	6.6	7.3	8.0	12.5	11.3	7.6	5.6	5.9	4.2	84.5
Average snowy days	3.1	2.8	1.2	0.1	0	0	0	0	0	0	0.5	1.6	9.3
Average relative humidity (%)	67	66	63	64	69	72	82	83	78	73	71	68	71
Mean monthly sunshine hours	138.2	144.4	187.0	212.3	221.9	191.4	185.4	185.6	178.0	176.6	148.5	145.4	2,114.7
Percentage possible sunshine	44	46	50	54	51	44	42	45	48	51	48	48	48
Source: China Meteorological Administration

== Administrative divisions ==
At present, Pizhou City has 24 towns.

24 towns

- Yunhe (运河镇)
- Picheng (邳城镇)
- Guanhu (官湖镇)
- Sihu (四户镇)
- Suyangshan (宿羊山镇)
- Bayiji (八义集镇)
- Tushan (土山镇)
- Nianzhuang (碾庄镇)
- Gangshang (港上镇)
- Zouzhuang (邹庄镇)
- Zhancheng (占城镇)
- Xinhe (新河镇)
- Balu (八路镇)
- Paoche (炮车镇)
- Tiefu (铁富镇)
- Chahe (岔河镇)
- Daixu (戴圩镇)
- Chenlou (陈楼镇)
- Xinglou (邢楼镇)
- Daizhuang (戴庄镇)
- Chefushan (车辐山镇)
- Yanzibu (燕子埠镇)
- Zhaodun (赵墩镇)
- Yitang (议堂镇)
