= Battle of Qi Mountains =

Battle between warlords Cao Cao and Zhang Lu (214)

- Part of end of the Han dynasty
Date	214 CE
Location	Various locations on and surrounding the Qi Mountains
Result	Cao Cao victory

Belligerents
Cao Cao	Zhang Lu; Qiang people Di people

Commanders and leaders
Xiahou Yuan	Ma Chao; Han Sui

Strength
5,000+	

The Battle of Qi Mountains was fought in 214 CE between the forces of the warlords Cao Cao and Zhang Lu. The battle was part of Ma Chao's multiple attacks on Cao Cao following the Battle of Tong Pass in 211.

== Background ==
Following Ma Chao's crushing defeat against Cao Cao's great numbers at Weinan, Ma Chao went on to fight without the strength he once had with the Guandong coalition and he started to besiege Jicheng in 213 when Cao Cao was fighting Sun Quan in Ruxukou with fellow officer Yang Ang (楊昂). The siege was a success, but it did not take long until an uproar against Ma Chao occurred causing the Battle of Lucheng.

Yang Fu defeated Ma Chao, and as Ma fled from the scene, he re-met with Yang. This time, Ma took the offensive and struck Yang Fu violently with his spear. Thus, injuring him severely.

To add on, Ma Chao's generals Pang De and Ma Dai fled from Liang Province to take refuge with the warlord Zhang Lu. Ma Chao would end up joining them as well.

== The battle ==
=== Zhang Lu gives troops to Ma Chao ===
It did not take long until Ma Chao took another attempt to wage war with Cao Cao. He persuaded Zhang Lu to lend him troops in order to wage war with Cao in the Spring of 214. The troops were lent so Ma Chao could attempt to recapture Liang Province. Zhang Lu sent Ma Chao off to besiege Qi Mountain.

=== Zhang He leads the vanguard ===
When the threat started, Xiahou Yuan was informed of Ma's advance by Jiang Xu. However, Xiahou Yuan was counseled by his officers who recommended that they wait for orders directly from Cao Cao. Xiahou Yuan replied reasoning that Cao Cao was in Ye, and it was too far for reports to be swapped if Jiang Xu and his people were to survive.

Xiahou Yuan began his advance, sending general Zhang He as the vanguard of 5,000 troops. Ma Chao was quickly defeated and fled.

=== Xiahou Yuan defeats Han Sui ===
Xiahou Yuan then planned to attack Han Sui with surprise while he was stationed in Xianqin, hoping to capture him. However, Han Sui escaped. Xiahou Yuan ordered his forces to begin pursuit, chasing him into Lueyang. At the time, Xiahou Yuan was 15,000 meters away from Han Sui and many encouraged the continuation of the pursuit. However, another suggestion was given that favored attacking the Di barbarians from Xingguo. Xiahou Yuan knew that Han Sui's men were well trained and that the walls of Xingguo were strong, therefore quick victory was not an option. He then suggested attacking the Qiang at Changli. He suggested that since many of the Qiang's people have joined Han Sui's ranks, attacking the Qiang will draw the people to leave him to provide aid in the Qiang's defense. This would weaken Han Sui's forces. On the other hand, if Han Sui reinforced Changli he would be vulnerable to an offensive.

Xiahou Yuan split up with the rest of the army and led light troops to the Qiang camp of the Shaodang Qiang and Han Sui provided no assistance.

When Xiahou Yuan's officers saw the size of Han Sui's army, they strongly suggested building a moat and stockades. However, Xiahou Yuan declined the suggestion reasoning that the troops would tire after the long march. Xiahou Yuan ordered the drum to be sounded, and Han Sui's forces were wiped out entirely.

After that, he besieged Xingguo and forced King Qianwan of the Di people to flee to Ma Chao. The remaining forces under him surrendered to Xiahou Yuan. Immediately after, Xiahou Yuan also successfully attacked Gaoping and the Chuge people of the Xiongnu.
