= Jiang Xu =

Early 3rd century Chinese military general

- 姜叙

General Who Pacifies the Barbarians (撫夷將軍)
- In office ?–?
- Monarch: Emperor Xian of Han
- Chancellor: Cao Cao

Personal details
- Born: Unknown Tianshui, Gansu
- Died: Unknown
- Relations: Yang Fu (relative)
- Children: one unnamed son
- Occupation: General
- Courtesy name: Boyi (伯弈)

Jiang Xu (fl. 211–213), courtesy name Boyi, was a military general who lived in the late Eastern Han dynasty of China. He is best known for his involvement in the conflict between the warlord Ma Chao and the Han central government (under the control of the warlord Cao Cao) in the 210s CE.

== Life ==
Jiang Xu was from Tianshui Commandery (天水郡), which is around present-day Tianshui, Gansu. He was very close to his relative, (Note: The exact relationship between Jiang Xu and Yang Fu is unclear. The Sanguozhi mentioned that they were half-brothers (same mother but different fathers), while the Lie Nü Zhuan by Huangfu Mi recorded that they were cousins (Yang Fu's mother was Jiang Xu's paternal aunt).) Yang Fu, whom he grew up with. Yang Fu served as a subordinate of Wei Kang, the Inspector (刺史) of Liang Province (covering parts of northwestern China).

In 211, a coalition of warlords from northwestern China, under the leadership of Ma Chao and Han Sui, started a rebellion in Liang Province against the Han central government, which was headed by Cao Cao. Cao Cao's forces defeated Ma Chao and the coalition at the Battle of Tong Pass.

In the subsequent years, Ma Chao, with support from the Qiang tribes and the warlord Zhang Lu, constantly raided and attacked the lands in Liang Province. At the time, Wei Kang was stationed in Liang Province's capital, Ji (兾; also called Jicheng, in present-day Gangu County, Gansu), which came under siege by Ma Chao. As the siege dragged on, Wei Kang took pity on the plight of the defenders and civilian population, so in 213 he surrendered to Ma Chao – against the advice of Zhao Ang, Yang Fu and his other subordinates. After taking over the city, Ma Chao killed Wei Kang, seized control of Liang Province, and forced Wei Kang's subordinates to submit to him.

At the time, Jiang Xu held the appointment General Who Pacifies the Barbarians (撫夷將軍) and was stationed in the county of Li (歷; also called Licheng, within present-day Tianshui, Gansu). Yang Fu secretly harboured the intention of avenging Wei Kang, so when his wife died, he used her death as an excuse to take leave from work. He then visited Jiang Xu and his mother in Li county. During the visit, Yang Fu lamented about how Ma Chao had committed atrocities and occupied Liang Province illegitimately, and expressed his desire to get rid of Ma Chao. Jiang Xu's mother agreed with what Yang Fu said, and urged her son to support Yang Fu in the name of righteousness. Yang Fu and Jiang Xu secretly contacted several others, including Wei Kang's former subordinates, and made plans to force Ma Chao out of Liang Province. The others involved in the plot included: Jiang Yin (姜隱), Zhao Ang, Yin Feng (尹奉), Yao Qiong (姚瓊), Kong Xin (孔信), Li Jun (李俊), Wang Ling (王靈), Liang Kuan (梁寬), Zhao Qu (趙衢), Pang Gong (龐恭), and Yang Fu's relatives Yang Yue (楊岳) and Yang Mo (楊謨).

In October 213, (Note: In Zizhi Tongjian Kaoyi, Sima Guang noted that while Yang Fu's biography in Sanguozhi recorded that he rebelled against Ma Chao in the 9th month of the 17th year of the Jian'an era (corresponding to 13 Oct to 11 Nov 212 in the Julian calendar), Cao Cao's biography in the same work recorded that Ma Chao became a menace in Hanyang again in the 18th year (corresponding to c.213), and that Zhao Qu and co. defeated Ma and drove him to Hanzhong in the 1st month of the 19th year (corresponding to 29 Jan to 26 Feb 214). Sima opinioned that since Jiang Xu rose in rebellion in the 9th month of the 18th year (corresponding to 3 to 31 Oct 213), the battle shouldn't have lasted until the 1st month of the following year. He thought that it was news of Ma Chao's defeat that had reached Yecheng in the 1st month of the 19th year.) Jiang Xu and Yang Fu started a rebellion against Ma Chao in another county, Lu (鹵; also called Lucheng, in present-day southeastern Gansu). At the same time, Zhao Qu and the others who were with Ma Chao in Ji City pretended to urge Ma Chao to suppress the rebellion. Ma Chao then led troops from Ji City to attack Lu County in an attempt to suppress the revolt. After failing to retake Lu County, Ma Chao decided to return to Ji City. However, while he was away, Zhao Qu, Liang Kuan and the others had seized control of Ji City and killed his wife and child(ren). In anger, Ma Chao led his forces to attack Li County, where Jiang Xu's family members were. The defenders at Li County heard that Ma Chao had fled to Hanzhong Commandery after his defeat so they lowered their guard. They mistook Ma Chao for Jiang Xu, and unsuspectingly allowed him to enter. Ma Chao occupied Li County by force and captured Jiang Xu's mother and son. Jiang Xu's mother scolded Ma Chao, "You're an unfilial son who betrays his own father and a treacherous villain who murders his superior. Heaven and Earth will not forgive you. You should die immediately. How dare you look at me straight in the eye!" The enraged Ma Chao killed her and Jiang Xu's son and then burnt down Li County. Jiang Xu's subsequent fate was not recorded in history.

== See also ==
- Lists of people of the Three Kingdoms
