= Wang Yi (wife of Zhao Ang) =

3rd-century military leader, wife of Zhao Ang

Wang Yi 王異
- Born: Unknown
- Died: Unknown
- Occupations: Military general, warrior
- Spouse: Zhao Ang
- Children: Zhao Ying; Zhao Yue; two other sons

Wang Yi or Shi Yi (Note: In his annotations to Zizhi Tongjian, Hu Sanxing claimed that the surname of Zhao Ang's wife was recorded as "Shi" in Huangfu Mi's Lie Nü Zhuan. Zizhi Tongjian itself only used her given name "Yi" to refer to her.) (fl. 210s) was a Chinese military general and warrior from the Three Kingdoms period. She was the wife of Zhao Ang, an official who lived during the late Eastern Han dynasty and was aligned with the faction that would later become the state of Wei during the Three Kingdoms period. She is known as the heroic woman for her morally upright character and for fighting alongside her family and the Wei Kingdom in various conflicts with the warlord Ma Chao in the 210s.

== Background ==
Wang Yi's exact origins are not recorded in history. All that is known of her heritage was that her family name was "Wang" (or "Shi"), and that she married Zhao Ang, an official who lived in the late Eastern Han dynasty. She bore Zhao Ang three sons and a daughter.

== As Liang Shuang's captive ==
When Zhao Ang was serving as the Prefect of Qiangdao County (羌道縣; around present-day Zhugqu County, Gansu), he left his family in Xi District (西鄉) of the county. Around the time, Liang Shuang (梁雙) started a revolt in the county and occupied Xi District. Wang Yi's two sons were killed during the conflict, leaving behind Wang Yi and her six-year-old daughter, Zhao Ying (趙英). When Wang Yi saw that her two sons had died, she feared that Liang Shuang would violate her, so she attempted to slit her throat with a sword. However, she gave up when she saw her daughter and she said: "If I killed myself and abandoned you, who will take care of you? I heard that people will cover their noses if someone wore unclean clothing – even if the person was Xi Shi. Besides, my looks aren't even comparable to Xi Shi's." She then rubbed dirt and excrement on her clothes, and fasted to make herself become thin. This lasted for about a year.

Wang Yi was spared from disaster when Liang Shuang reconciled with the authorities in Qiangdao County. Zhao Ang sent his men to fetch his wife and daughter. When they were about 30 li away from their destination, Wang Yi suddenly stopped and told Zhao Ying: "I'd have never left that place if your father didn't send someone to fetch us. Whenever I read the stories of Lady Jiang (Note: Lady Jiang is better known as "Zhen Jiang" (貞姜; literally "Chaste Jiang"). She was the wife of King Zhao of the Chu state in the Spring and Autumn period. One day, King Zhao went on a tour with her, and left her on a platform on the riverbank while he sailed down the river. Later, he noticed that the river was overflowing and the platform was in danger of being flooded, so he sent a messenger to inform Lady Jiang to move away from the river. However, the king forgot to give a royal tablet – a symbol of his authority – to the messenger, so Lady Jiang refused to move when she saw that the messenger did not have the tablet. To her, it meant that the messenger was not authorised by the king. The messenger rushed back to retrieve the tablet, but by the time he returned to the platform, the platform had been completely submerged and Lady Jiang had drowned. King Zhao was very impressed with her devotion to him that he gave her the posthumous name "Zhen Jiang". Lady Jiang's story was later compiled into the Biographies of Exemplary Women.) and Lady Bo, (Note: Lady Bo (伯姬) was the wife of Duke Gong of the Song state (宋共公) in the Spring and Autumn period. She probably lived to an old age because she was still living when her great-grandson, Duke Jing (宋景公), became the duke of Song. One night, a fire broke out in the palace and the servants wanted to bring her out. However, she refused because, according to palace customs at the time, she was not allowed to leave the palace without being accompanied by her ladies-in-waiting. Her ladies-in-waiting had already fled for their lives. Lady Bo firmly refused to leave the palace and died in the blaze. Her firm devotion to the palace rules earned her the praise of many people. Lady Bo's story was later compiled into the Biographies of Exemplary Women.) I feel inspired by their devotions and convictions. However, I am still alive after having gone through a similar experience, so wouldn't I feel ashamed when I face those ladies after I die? I didn't choose death then because of you. Now, since we are close to safety and within the protection of the authorities, I can leave you and die." Having said that, she attempted suicide by consuming poison but luckily for her, an antidote was available, so she received medical treatment quickly and survived.

== Siege of Jicheng ==
Sometime during the Jian'an era (196–220) of the reign of Emperor Xian, Zhao Ang was reassigned to be an Army Adviser (參軍事) and relocated to Ji County (兾縣; present-day Gangu County, Gansu). In 211, the warlord Ma Chao started a rebellion against Cao Cao, the warlord who controlled the Han central government, but was defeated along with his allies by Cao Cao's forces at the Battle of Tong Pass. In the following two or three years after the battle, Ma Chao constantly raided the lands in Liang Province (covering roughly present-day Gansu and Ningxia) and attacked the cities in the area.

When Ma Chao attacked Ji County, Wang Yi donned a battledress, armed herself with a bow and arrows, and assisted Zhao Ang in defending the city from Ma Chao's forces. She also handed out her personal accessories as rewards to the soldiers and substantially raised the defenders' morale. However, as Ma Chao pressed on the attack, the city gradually ran short of supplies and its defenders and civilian population began to suffer from hunger. Zhao Ang's superior, Wei Kang, the governor of Liang Province, took pity on the plight of the people and planned to start peace talks with Ma Chao. Zhao Ang tried to dissuade Wei Kang from doing so but was ignored. Zhao Ang returned home and told his wife about it. Wang Yi replied: "A ruler has advisers to provide him counsel; officials also have the right to disregard the command hierarchy and take matters into their own hands when the situation calls for it. There's nothing wrong with you being dictatorial under the current circumstances. Who knows whether reinforcements will arrive soon? We should encourage all the troops to perform their duties to the utmost and lay down their lives if necessary. We must never give in to the rebels' demands." However, by the time Zhao Ang went back to see Wei Kang, the latter had already concluded his negotiations with Ma Chao, with both sides agreeing to end the conflict.

== Living under Ma Chao's control ==
Ma Chao broke his word later – he killed Wei Kang, captured Zhao Ang, and kept Zhao Ang and Wang Yi's son, Zhao Yue (趙月), as a hostage in Nanzheng County. He hoped that Zhao Ang would comply with his demands and serve him, but was uncertain about Zhao Ang's intentions. Ma Chao's wife, Lady Yang (楊氏), heard of Wang Yi's reputation, so she hosted a feast and invited Wang Yi to attend. Wang Yi planned to make use of that opportunity to help her husband gain Ma Chao's trust and wait for a chance to take revenge. She told Lady Yang: "In the past, Guan Zhong became the chancellor of Qi and made great achievements; You Yu entered Qin and played an important role in Duke Mu's rise to power. Now that Ji County has just been pacified, we need men of talent to govern and maintain the city. Only in this way can Liang Province's armies compete with those in the Central Plains. As such, it's imperative that talented people be employed and their abilities put to good use." Lady Yang was very impressed with Wang Yi and thought that Wang Yi was loyal to her husband's faction. She gradually became close to Wang Yi, and Zhao Ang began to gain Ma Chao's trust. Zhao Ang was able to survive under Ma Chao's control because of his wife's efforts.

== Driving Ma Chao out of Liang Province ==
When Zhao Ang secretly plotted with Yang Fu and others to drive Ma Chao out of Liang Province, he conveyed his worries about Zhao Yue – who was still held hostage by Ma Chao – to Wang Yi. However, Wang Yi sternly replied: "Loyalty and righteousness are the core virtues a person should possess. Now, we are going to erase our earlier humiliation. We might end up sacrificing our lives and this isn't a cause for concern, so does the loss of our son still mean anything? Xiang Tuo and Yan Hui left their good names in history because they valued righteousness." Zhao Ang agreed with his wife.

The plot turned out successful. They managed to lure Ma Chao out of Ji County to suppress a revolt in Lu County, and then block him from entering Ji County again when he returned to the city after failing to defeat the rebels. Ma Chao fled to Hanzhong Commandery, borrowed troops from the warlord Zhang Lu, and returned to attack Liang Province. Zhao Ang and Wang Yi had moved to Mount Qi (祁山; the mountainous regions around present-day Li County, Gansu) by then. Ma Chao's army besieged Zhao Ang's forces at Mount Qi for about 30 days until reinforcements led by Cao Cao's generals Xiahou Yuan and Zhang He arrived and lifted the siege. After his defeat, Ma Chao went to Nanzheng County and killed Zhao Yue, after which he, Ma Dai and Pang De fled back to Hanzhong Commandery. Throughout the whole period of time from the siege at Ji County to the battle at Mount Qi, Zhao Ang had launched nine attacks on Ma Chao and Wang Yi participated in all of them.

== In Romance of the Three Kingdoms ==
Wang Yi briefly appears in the 14th-century historical novel Romance of the Three Kingdoms, in which she is referred to as Lady Wang (王氏).

The narrative depicts Zhao Ang and Wang Yi's son, Zhao Yue, as a Major-General (裨將) in Ma Chao's army. After Ma Chao murders Wei Kang, Zhao Ang wants to avenge his superior, but he hesitates because his son is with Ma Chao, so he consults his wife. Lady Wang's response to her husband is similar to the one documented in the Lie Nü Zhuan, but the last sentence about Xiang Tuo and Yan Hui has been changed to: "If you do not carry out your plan because of our son, I will die first." Ma Chao feels so angry at Zhao Ang's betrayal that he kills Zhao Yue and seeks revenge for his losses by massacring several civilians in the area. Lady Wang survives because she is with her husband all that while.

== In popular culture ==
Wang Yi is a playable character in Koei's Dynasty Warriors 7: Xtreme Legends, Dynasty Warriors 8, Warriors Orochi 3, and Romance of the Three Kingdoms video game series.

== See also ==
- Lists of people of the Three Kingdoms
