= Zhao Ang =

3rd century official serving warlord Cao Cao

- 趙昂

Inspector of Yi Province (益州刺史) (nominal)
- In office ?–?
- Monarch: Emperor Xian of Han
- Chancellor: Cao Cao

Personal details
- Born: Unknown Tianshui, Gansu
- Died: Unknown/219^{ZY}
- Spouse: Wang Yi
- Children: Zhao Ying; Zhao Yue; two other sons
- Occupation: Politician
- Courtesy name: Weizhang (偉章/偉璋)

Zhao Ang (fl. 210s), courtesy name Weizhang, was a Chinese politician who lived in the late Eastern Han dynasty and was aligned with the faction that would later become the state of Cao Wei in the Three Kingdoms period. He is best known for resisting the warlord Ma Chao in Liang Province (covering roughly present-day Gansu and Ningxia) in the 210s. His wife, Wang Yi, is famous for supporting her husband throughout their conflict with Ma Chao.

== Early career ==
Zhao Ang was from Tianshui Commandery (天水郡), which is in present-day Tianshui, Gansu. In his early years, he served as an Assistant Officer (從事) in Liang Province, alongside Yang Fu and Yin Feng (尹奉), who were also from Tianshui Commandery.

Later, while Zhao Ang was serving as the Prefect (令) of Qiangdao County (羌道縣; around present-day Zhugqu County, Gansu), Liang Shuang (梁雙) started a revolt in the county and conquered Xi (西), a district in Qiangdao where Zhao Ang's family members lived. Zhao Ang's two sons were killed, while his wife Wang Yi and his daughter Zhao Ying (趙英) were held hostage by Liang Shuang. They survived and were reunited with him after Liang Shuang made peace with the local authorities.

== Siege of Jicheng ==
Sometime during the Jian'an era (196–220) in the reign of Emperor Xian, Zhao Ang was reassigned to be an Army Advisor (參軍事) and relocated to Ji (兾; also called Jicheng, in present-day Gangu County, Gansu), the provincial capital of Liang Province. In 211, the northwestern warlord Ma Chao started a rebellion against Cao Cao, the de facto head of the Han central government. Cao Cao defeated Ma Chao and his allies at the Battle of Tong Pass later that year. In the subsequent years after the battle, Ma Chao constantly raided the lands in Liang Province and attacked the counties in the area.

When Ma Chao attacked Ji, Zhao Ang and his troops put up a firm defence and managed to hold off the enemy for some time. However, over time, the city gradually ran out of supplies and its defenders and civilian population began to suffer. Zhao Ang's superior, Wei Kang, the Inspector (刺史) of Liang Province, took pity on the plight of the people and planned to start peace talks with Ma Chao. Zhao Ang tried to dissuade Wei Kang from doing so but was ignored. When he told Wang Yi about the problem, she urged him to fight on and encourage his men to do the same. However, by the time Zhao Ang went back to see Wei Kang, the latter had already concluded his negotiations with Ma Chao, with both sides agreeing to end the conflict.

== Driving Ma Chao out of Liang Province ==
Ma Chao broke his word later – he killed Wei Kang, captured Zhao Ang, and kept Zhao and Wang Yi's son, Zhao Yue (趙月), as a hostage in Nanzheng County. He hoped that Zhao Ang would comply with his demands and serve him, but was uncertain about Zhao's intentions. Wang Yi met Lady Yang (楊氏), Ma Chao's wife, and managed to get close to her and convince her that Zhao Ang was loyal to Ma Chao. Ma Chao's suspicions towards Zhao Ang gradually decreased.

Zhao Ang had been secretly planning with Yang Fu, Yin Feng (尹奉), Jiang Xu and others to avenge Wei Kang and drive Ma Chao out of Liang Province. However, he was worried that Ma Chao would harm Zhao Yue, who was still being held hostage, but eventually agreed with his wife to sacrifice their son for the sake of upholding righteousness.

The plan turned out to be a success: Yang Fu and Jiang Xu started a rebellion against Ma Chao in Lu (鹵; or Lucheng, in present-day southeastern Gansu), while Yin Feng and the others who were with Ma Chao in Ji (兾; also called Jicheng, in present-day Gangu County, Gansu) at the time pretended to urge Ma Chao to lead troops to Lu to suppress the revolt. Ma Chao failed to recapture Lu from the rebels so he returned to Ji, but found himself locked out because while he was away, Yin Feng and the others had seized control of Lu and killed his wife and child(ren). Ma Chao retreated to Hanzhong Commandery, borrowed troops from the warlord Zhang Lu, and returned to attack Liang Province. Zhao Ang and Wang Yi had moved to Mount Qi (祁山; the mountainous regions around present-day Li County, Gansu) by then. Ma Chao's army besieged Zhao Ang's forces at Mount Qi for about 30 days until reinforcements led by Cao Cao's generals Xiahou Yuan and Zhang He arrived and lifted the siege. After his defeat, Ma Chao went to Nanzheng County and killed Zhao Yue. For the whole period of time from the siege at Ji to the battle at Mount Qi, Zhao Ang had launched a total of nine attacks on Ma Chao.

== Later career ==
Zhao Ang eventually rose to the position of Inspector (刺史) of Yi Province (covering present-day Sichuan and Chongqing), but never assumed office in reality because Yi Province was under the control of the warlord Liu Bei, one of Cao Cao's key rivals.

In 219, during the Battle of Mount Dingjun, Liu Bei's general Huang Zhong defeated and killed Cao Cao's general Xiahou Yuan and an official Zhao Yong (趙顒; 赵颙; Zhào Yóng). Zhao Yong held the appointment of Inspector of Yi Province. This "Zhao Yong" is believed to be Zhao Ang because the Chinese characters for yong 顒 and ang 昂 had similar meanings: namely, 舉 "to (be) lift(ed) / to (be) raise(d)"; and also because yong 顒 and ang 昂 were pronounced almost similarly: *ŋuoŋ and *ŋɑŋ, respectively, in Eastern Han Chinese. Moreover, they held the same appointment and lived around the same period of time. Therefore, it is possible that the name "Zhao Ang" was erroneously recorded as "Zhao Yong".

== See also ==
- Lists of people of the Three Kingdoms
