= Siege of Jicheng =

Part of campaign by Ma Chao to retake Liang Province (213)

- Part of the wars at the end of the Han dynasty
Date	213 CE
Location	Gangu County, Gansu, China
Result	Ma Chao victory

Belligerents
Ma Chao; Zhang Lu; Qiang people Hu people	Cao Cao

Commanders and leaders
Ma Chao; Yang Ang	Wei Kang (surrendered) (executed); Yang Yue (surrendered)

Strength
10,000	1,000

Siege of Jicheng
- Traditional Chinese: 冀城之圍
- Simplified Chinese: 冀城之围
Transcriptions
Standard Mandarin
- Hanyu Pinyin: Jìchéng Zhī Wéi

The siege of Jicheng was a part of the campaign Ma Chao initiated in an attempt to retake Liang Province after the coalition of Guanxi (west of Hangu Pass) was defeated at the Battle of Tong Pass in the winter of 211 in the late Eastern Han dynasty.

== Background ==
After the coalition melted down, Ma Chao took the remainder of his army towards Lantian, where he could prepare a stand against Cao Cao. Unexpectedly, Su Bo in Hejian rebelled, and Cao Cao decided to lead his main army to quell the uprising, sparing Ma Chao the time to recuperate. Thus, Ma Chao gradually regained his strength, and once again wielded great influence over local non-Han people. To resist Cao Cao, Ma Chao had recruited many Qiang and Hu soldiers, and received reinforcements from Zhang Lu of Hanzhong. He had planned to conquer all counties in Longxi (west of Long Ridges), and within a year, all cities except Jicheng (capital of Tianshui Commandery) in the area surrendered to the allied force.

== Siege ==
In 213, Ma Chao started to besiege Jicheng, but it proved to be difficult. Even though the Inspector of Liang Province, Wei Kang, faced a large numerical disadvantage, his assistant, Yang Fu, greatly encouraged the defenders by taking the lead in protecting the city. Yang Fu recruited around 1,000 scholars and clansmen to place under the command of his cousin, Yang Yue, and he himself acted as Yang Yue's strategist. Yang Fu told Yang Yue to set up the crescent moon formation atop the city wall to counter Ma Chao's siege and wait for reinforcements from the east. However, from the first month to the eighth month, there was no sign that a relief force was on its way, so Wei Kang sent his subordinate, Yan Wen, to sneak out under cover of darkness to get help from Xiahou Yuan, who was stationed at Chang'an.

However, Yan Wen was caught by Ma Chao's soldiers, and Ma Chao tried to use the respected elder to his advantage. The warlord forced the captive to go to the city walls and tell the defenders that no help would come from Chang'an. However, the stubborn old man shouted, "A grand force from the east is coming, keep holding until they arrive!" For this Ma Chao asked Yan Wen whether the latter treasured his very own life, but Yan did not reply. Since Ma Chao had been struggling to breach the city wall for a long time, he wanted to lure the influential Yan Wen to change allegiance, so he gave Yan Wen another chance, asking whether the latter knew anyone inside the city who would welcome the invaders, but the old man still remained silent. Now Ma Chao was irritated and censured the elder venomously, causing Yan Wen to finally stand up and say, "A gentleman serving a lord can die for him but not betray him, yet you desired an old man to conduct evil speeches! Am I a person who would rather live in shame?" Then, a speechless Ma Chao executed Yan Wen in rage.

After witnessing the death of Yan Wen, however, both Wei Kang and the Administrator of Jicheng were terrified, and they hesitated to resist further. Although Yang Fu strongly opposed surrender, Wei Kang opened the city gates and let Ma Chao in. Once Ma Chao got inside the fortress-city, he arrested Yang Yue, and asked Zhang Lu's officer, Yang Ang (楊昂), to murder Wei Kang and the Administrator of Jicheng.

== Aftermath ==
At the beginning of the siege, Cao Cao was fighting Sun Quan in Ruxukou, and after he returned to the city of Ye, he was busy launching the establishment of the principality of Cao Wei. Therefore, he was too occupied to send reinforcements, and only in the eighth month did he let Xiahou Yuan lead a relief force to Jicheng. Not knowing the city had already fallen, Xiahou Yuan's unit ran into that of Ma Chao's 200 li outside of Jicheng, where Xiahou was defeated. Such a victory greatly impressed Qianwan, leader of the Di tribe, so the latter allied with Ma Chao, who now named himself General Who Conquers the West and Governor of Bing Province.

By conquering Jicheng, Ma Chao had gained a base from which to command the majority of Liang Province and exert influence around the area. However, Ma Chao's success would not last long, as Yang Fu contacted some former officers of Wei Kang to rebel against Ma Chao simultaneously in the ninth month of 213. At the end, Ma Chao, Pang De, and his cousin Ma Dai fled Liang Province and took refuge under Zhang Lu.

== In popular culture ==
The siege on Jicheng is featured in Koei's video game Dynasty Warriors 5: Xtreme Legends and is called Battle of Ji Castle.
