= Battle of Lucheng =

Battle between Yang Fu and warlord Ma Chao (213)

- Part of the wars at the end of the Han dynasty
Date	213 CE
Location	present-day southeastern Gansu
Result	Yang Fu victory; Ma Chao flees

Belligerents
Ma Chao	Yang Fu; Cao Cao

Commanders and leaders
Ma Chao	Yang Fu; Jiang Xu; Xiahou Yuan

Battle of Lucheng
- Traditional Chinese: 鹵城之戰
- Simplified Chinese: 卤城之战
Transcriptions
Standard Mandarin
- Hanyu Pinyin: Lǔchéng Zhī Zhàn

The Battle of Lucheng of 213 was part of a rebellion led by Yang Fu against the warlord Ma Chao in the late Eastern Han dynasty. The revolt was initiated by disgruntled parties under the new rule of Ma Chao, who forcefully took over governorship of Liang Province from Wei Kang (韋康) in the siege of Jicheng.

== Background ==
Yang Fu wanted to rebel against Ma Chao to avenge his former lord Wei Kang. He had the support of his two friends Zhao Qu (趙衢), and Liang Kuan (梁寬). One day he went to Ma Chao and told him his wife died and he wanted to take two months off to bury her. On the way he visited his cousin Jiang Xu for aid. He decided to take action along with his two aides, Zhao Ang, and Yin Feng.

== Battle ==
Zhao Qu gave Ma Chao false advice to attack Jiang Xu, Yang Fu, Zhao Ang, Wang Yi, and Yin Feng immediately, and he would guard Jicheng in Ma's absence. After Ma Chao left with Ma Dai and Pang De to put down the rebellion, Zhao Qu and Liang Kuan took over and slaughtered Ma Chao's family. Meanwhile, Ma Chao, Ma Dai, and Pang De went to oppose Yang Fu and Jiang Xu in Lucheng. At first it looked like the defenders had no chance, so they retreated and Ma Chao pursued. They kept on retreating until the second army led by Zhao Ang and Yin Feng arrived. Then Xiahou Yuan's army sent by Cao Cao arrived. Ma Chao was unable to withstand an attack from three sides so he retreated.

== Retreat from Jicheng ==
Ma Chao retreated back to Jicheng. He hailed the gates, but his response was a flight of arrows. Zhao Qu and Liang Kuan appeared and they threw his wife's dead body down. Ma Chao, filled with rage, almost fell off his horse. Eventually they reached Lucheng, the night guards thought that they were their own troops returning. As soon as they were inside they began the slaughter of every one. They even killed Jiang Xu's mother and son.

The next day, Xiahou Yuan arrived and Ma Chao retreated west, only to run into Yang Fu seven miles later. He gripped his spear in rage and charged towards Yang Fu, injuring him five times, but Yang lived. Ma Chao then retreated with Ma Dai and Pang De and took refuge under the warlord Zhang Lu of Hanzhong.

== Aftermath ==
Ma Chao later grew unhappy with Zhang Lu, so he and his cousin Ma Dai went to join the warlord Liu Bei, who, around that time, had just seized control of Yi Province (covering present-day Sichuan and Chongqing). Pang De later went to serve Cao Cao after Zhang Lu surrendered Hanzhong to Cao following the Battle of Yangping.
