= Ma Ai =

Administrator of Dunhuang who died on duty, triggering a rebellion (late Eastern Han)

- 馬艾

Administrator of Dunhuang Commandery (敦煌太守)
- In office c. 218 – 220
- Monarchs: Emperor Xian of Han/ Cao Pi
- Preceded by: ?
- Succeeded by: Zhang Gong

Personal details
- Born: Unknown
- Died: 219 or 220 CE Dunhuang, Liang Province

Ma Ai (fl.218–220) was the Administrator of Dunhuang Commandery in the western Hexi Corridor during the end of the Eastern Han dynasty.

Ma Ai
- Traditional Chinese: 馬艾
- Simplified Chinese: 马艾
Transcriptions
Standard Mandarin
- Hanyu Pinyin: Mǎ Ài

== Background ==
He was appointed Administrator of Dunhuang in 218.

== Death and frontier crisis ==
Ma Ai died at his post and was replaced by Zhang Gong, who led an attack against rebels during his time at post.

== See also ==
- Hexi Corridor
- Liang Province
