= Yang Fu (Han dynasty) =

3rd century Cao Wei state official and politician

- 楊阜

Minister Steward (少府)
- In office ?–?
- Monarch: Cao Pi / Cao Rui

Colonel of the City Gates (城門校尉)
- In office ?–?
- Monarch: Cao Pi / Cao Rui

Administrator of Wudu (武都太守)
- In office ?–?
- Monarch: Cao Pi / Cao Rui
- In office ? – 220
- Monarch: Emperor Xian of Han
- Chancellor: Cao Cao

Attendant Officer to the Inspector of Liang Province (涼州刺史別駕)
- In office ?–?
- Monarch: Emperor Xian of Han
- Chancellor: Cao Cao

Personal details
- Born: Unknown Gangu County, Gansu
- Died: Unknown (Note: While the year of Yang Fu's death was not recorded, it is likely that he died during Cao Rui's reign; Cao Rui himself died in Jan 239.)
- Relations: Yang Yue (cousin); Yang Mo (cousin); Jiang Xu (relative); Yang Bao (grandson)
- Occupation: Politician
- Courtesy name: Yishan (義山)
- Peerage: Secondary Marquis (關內侯)

Yang Fu (fl. 210s–230s), courtesy name Yishan, was a Chinese politician of the state of Cao Wei during the Three Kingdoms period of China. He previously served as a regional official in Liang Province during the late Eastern Han dynasty. In the 210s, when the warlord Ma Chao rebelled against the Han central government, occupied Liang Province by force and murdered some of the provincial officials, Yang Fu and his colleagues pretended to submit to Ma Chao. Later, they plotted a revolt against him and succeeded in forcing him out of Liang Province. During the reign of the second Wei emperor Cao Rui, Yang Fu proposed to the emperor to scale down his extravagant construction projects but the emperor ignored him.

== Early life ==
Yang Fu was from Ji County (冀縣; or Jicheng 冀城), Tianshui Commandery (天水郡), which is around present-day Gangu County, Gansu. He served as a minor official in the local commandery office in his youth. Once, when the military officers in his home commandery sought his opinion on who would win the battle of Guandu, he replied that "Lord Yuan (Yuan Shao) is lenient but indecisive, foxy but inconclusive; people won't be afraid of his might since he is indecisive, and he'll let opportunities slip by since he is inconclusive. Even he may be powerful now, he won't achieve anything great in the end. On the other hand, Lord Cao (Cao Cao) has ambition and vision, and he is able to make decisions without hesitation. His army is disciplined and strong, his officers come from a diverse range of backgrounds and are hardworking, so his forces will win." His prediction turned out to be accurate and he became famous throughout Liang Province for his foresight and brilliance. Later, Wei Kang, the Inspector of Liang Province, recruited him to be an Attendant Officer.

== Struggle for Liang Province ==
In 211, a coalition of warlords from the west of Hangu Pass started a rebellion against the Han central government, which was under the control of the warlord Cao Cao. Cao Cao led his forces to fight the warlords at the Battle of Tong Pass and defeated them. Ma Chao, one of the leading warlords in the coalition, managed to escape to the territory of the Qiang and Hu tribes to recuperate. Cao Cao pressed on his attacks against the remnants of the coalition and pursued Ma Chao to Anding Commandery, but pulled back his forces after hearing about unrest in his territories in the east. During this time, Yang Fu warned Cao Cao, "Ma Chao has the courage of Ying Bu and Han Xin, and he has the support of the Qiang and Hu tribes. If you order the army to retreat now and don't make enough preparations here, we'll forfeit the commanderies in the area." Cao Cao applauded Yang Fu's proposal but could not adopt it because he had to deal with Su Bo's rebellion in Hejian Commandery and Sun Quan's attack on Ruxu.

In 213, as soon as Cao Cao and his army left Liang Province, as Yang Fu foresaw, Ma Chao attacked the commanderies in Liang Province with support from Zhang Lu, a warlord in Hanzhong Commandery. Ma Chao soon besieged Ji County, the last stronghold in Liang Province which remained under Han control. Despite Yang Fu's valiant efforts to resist the enemy, Ji County still fell to Ma Chao, and Yang Fu was forced to submit to Ma Chao. Disgruntled by Ma Chao's cruelty and treachery (including his murder of Wei Kang, the Inspector of Liang Province), Yang Fu and other officials in Liang Province secretly hatched a plot to drive Ma Chao out of Liang Province. Yang Fu lied to Ma Chao that he wanted to see to the funeral arrangements for his recently deceased wife and gained permission to leave Ji County. He then used the opportunity to contact the other officials and prepare for their revolt against Ma Chao.

In October 213, (Note: In Zizhi Tongjian Kaoyi, Sima Guang noted that while Yang Fu's biography in Sanguozhi recorded that he rebelled against Ma Chao in the 9th month of the 17th year of the Jian'an era (corresponding to 13 Oct to 11 Nov 212 in the Julian calendar), Cao Cao's biography in the same work recorded that Ma Chao became a menace in Hanyang again in the 18th year (corresponding to c.213), and that Zhao Qu and co. defeated Ma and drove him to Hanzhong in the 1st month of the 19th year (corresponding to 29 Jan to 26 Feb 214). Sima opinioned that since Jiang Xu rose in rebellion in the 9th month of the 18th year (corresponding to 3 to 31 Oct 213), the battle should not have lasted until the 1st month of the following year. He thought that it was news of Ma Chao's defeat that had reached Yecheng in the 1st month of the 19th year.) Yang Fu started a rebellion against Ma Chao in Lu County to lure Ma Chao to lead his troops out of Ji County to attack him. In the meantime, while Ma Chao was away, the other officials in Ji County responded to Yang Fu's call and killed Ma Chao's wife and child(ren), who were in Ji County. Ma Chao was unable to retake Lu County so he retreated to Ji County, only to find his family dead and the city gates shut. He then led his remaining forces to attack Li County, where some of Yang Fu's relatives and the families of the officials who rebelled against him were, and killed them in revenge. During the battles against Ma Chao, Yang Fu sustained five wounds over his body and lost seven relatives. Ma Chao eventually gave up on Liang Province and fled to Hanzhong Commandery to join the warlord Zhang Lu.

== Service under Cao Wei ==
Yang Fu continued serving in the Cao Wei state, founded by Cao Cao's son and successor Cao Pi, after the end of the Han dynasty in 220. He lived through the reigns of the first two Wei emperors, Cao Pi and Cao Rui, and was enfeoffed as a Secondary Marquis.

After he became emperor, Cao Rui once attempted to tug at Empress Dowager Guo's clothing as he begged her to play some music; Lady Guo was well known for her playing of the pipa. At the time, Yang Fu was by his side; he then asked the emperor, "The Empress Dowager is Your Majesty's dimu; (Note: used to denote the main wife of one's father in the traditional Chinese marriage system.) where is your decorum?" Ashamed, Cao Rui withdrew his hand. After Lady Guo left, the emperor said to Yang, "I know you emphasize greatly on proper behavior. But I am indeed feeling troubled. Now that I have listened to you, isn't it like standing beside the flowing waters of the Xiang River and being unable to see that person? (Note: referring to Lady Guo's pipa playing.)"

In 230, the Wei general Cao Zhen led an army to invade Wei's rival state Shu, but the advancement was thwarted by heavy rainfall, which lasted for more than a month and rendered the mountainous paths untraversable. Yang Fu, along with others, advised Cao Rui to order Cao Zhen to withdraw the Wei troops.

Later, when Cao Rui started on his extravagant construction projects and expansion of his imperial harem, Yang Fu repeatedly advised the emperor against such actions. However, Cao Rui ignored his advice. Yang Fu then sought permission to resign from his position as Minister Steward, but was denied. Since then, Cao Rui applauded Yang Fu for his suggestions, but seldom acted on them.

When Cao Rui's daughter Cao Shu (曹淑) died in infancy (less than one month old) on 15 February 232, (Note: Cao Shu's name was recorded as Tai in Tang Kaiyuan Zhanjing ([魏太和]六年正月甲戌, 皇女泰薨.上及羣臣皆為之服.) Tang Kaiyuan Zhanjing, vol.13) Cao Rui insisted on taking part in the funeral procession. Yang Fu noted that he did not do so during the funerals of Cao Pi and Empress Dowager Bian, and advised him not to join in the funeral procession. Cao Rui ignored Yang's advice.

Yang Fu died in an unknown year without much family property. He was succeeded by his grandson, Yang Bao (楊豹), presumably because his son(s) died early.

== See also ==
- Lists of people of the Three Kingdoms
