= Pan'an, Gangu =

Pan'an 磐安镇
- Town
- Location within Gansu
- Coordinates: 34.75°N 105.11°E
- Province: Gansu
- City: Tianshui
- County: Gangu County
- Elevation: 1,360 m (4,460 ft)

Population
  - Total: 80,000

Pan'an is a town in Gangu County, Tianshui, China.

The history of Pan'an can be traced back to the Tang dynasty, when it was a stop on the Silk Road. The present town was founded in 1718 as a marketplace after the 1718 Tongwei–Gansu earthquake destroyed the historical town called Yongning.

Nowadays it is known for the cultivation of chives.
