= Bian Zhang =

Chinese Han dynasty official (died 186)

- 邊章

Prefect of Xin'an (新安令)
- In office ?–?
- Monarch: Emperor Ling of Han

Personal details
- Born: Unknown
- Died: 187
- Occupation: Official, rebel
- Original name: Bian Yun (邊允) (Note: The Xiandi Chunqiu recorded that Bian changed his name along with Han Sui after the Han authorities offered a fiefdom of 1000 households for their capture during the Liang Province rebellion.)

Bian Zhang (died 187), (Note: Vol.58 of Zizhi Tongjian recorded that Bian Zhang was killed in the 3rd or 4th month of the 4th year of the Zhongping era of the reign of Emperor Ling of Han; the two months correspond to 28 March to 25 May 187 in the Julian calendar. Tongjian recorded that Bian was killed before Fu Xie, grandfather of Fu Xuan.) originally named Bian Yun, was an official who lived in the Eastern Han dynasty of China. He served as the Prefect of Xin'an County.

In 185, Beigong Boyu of the Qiang tribe rebelled in Liang Province. Beigong Boyu took Bian Zhang and Han Sui, another Han official, hostage and stopped all attempts to return them. Bian Zhang was forced to participate in the rebellion or else he would be killed. He became the overall commander of the rebels, but was defeated in battle with Dong Zhuo and Sun Jian and died of illness shortly after; according to other sources, he was killed by Han Sui.

== See also ==
- Lists of people of the Three Kingdoms
