= Ma Teng =

Chinese Han dynasty warlord (died 212)

- 馬騰
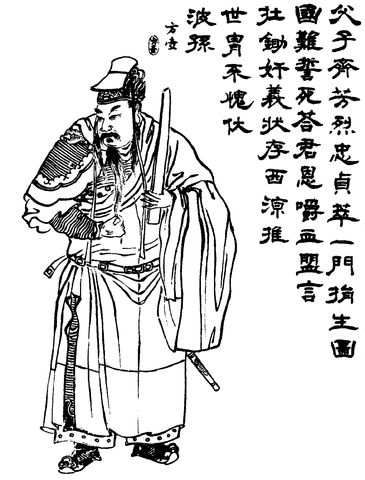
- A Qing dynasty illustration of Ma Teng

Minister of the Guards (衛尉)
- In office 208 – 211
- Monarch: Emperor Xian of Han
- Chancellor: Cao Cao

General of the Vanguard (前將軍)
- In office 208
- Monarch: Emperor Xian of Han

General Who Attacks the South (征南將軍)
- In office 202 – 208
- Monarch: Emperor Xian of Han

General Who Pacifies the Di (安狄將軍)
- In office 195 – 202
- Monarch: Emperor Xian of Han

General who Guards the West (鎮西将軍)
- In office 192 – 195
- Monarch: Emperor Xian of Han

Personal details
- Born: Unknown (Note: Although Ma Teng's age was not recorded, his eldest son Ma Chao was born in c.176. Thus, Ma Teng's birth year should be 163 or before.) Xingping, Shaanxi
- Died: June or July 212 Handan, Hebei
- Children: Ma Chao; Ma Xiu; Ma Tie
- Parent: Ma Ping (father)
- Relatives: Ma Dai (nephew)
- Occupation: Military general, warlord
- Courtesy name: Shoucheng (壽成)
- Peerage: Marquis of Huaili (槐里侯)

Ma Teng (died June or July 212), (Note: According to the annals of Liu Xie (Emperor Xian) in Book of the Later Han and vol.66 of Zizhi Tongjian, Ma Teng was executed on the guiwei day of the 5th month of the 17th year of the Jian'an era. However, there is no guiwei day in that month; the month corresponds to 17 Jun to 16 Jul 212 in the Julian calendar.) courtesy name Shoucheng, was a Chinese military general and warlord who lived during the late Eastern Han dynasty of China. He controlled Liang Province (涼州; covering parts of present-day Shaanxi and Gansu) with another warlord, Han Sui. Ma Teng and Han Sui were involved in efforts to gain autonomy from the Han central government.

== Life ==
Ma Teng was born in Maoling County (茂陵縣), Fufeng Commandery (扶風郡) (present-day Xingping, Shaanxi). He was a descendant of Ma Yuan. His father, Ma Ping (馬平), whose courtesy name was Zishuo (子碩), was a minor official in Tianshui Commandery during the reign of Emperor Huan of Han. Due to unknown reasons, he was dismissed from his post, and went to live among the Qiang people. Ma Ping's family was poor and without connections. Therefore, he married a Qiang woman, who gave birth to Ma Teng.

Ma Teng grew up in extreme poverty and made a living selling firewood to the city markets that he collected in the mountains. He was extremely tall, more than eight chi tall (approximately 1.84 metres), his appearance large and imposing, his face and nose majestic. He was also known to be virtuous therefore many people admired him.

In 184, towards the end of Emperor Ling's reign, the Qiang people in Liang Province rose up against the local government under Beigong Yu (北宫玉) and Liwen Hou (李文侯). They were joined by members of the local gentry Han Sui and Bian Zhang. The official Han governor of Liang Province, Geng Bi (耿鄙), gathered forces to put down the rebellion. He recruited among the locals, people known to be courageous and strong wishing to suppress the rebels. Ma Teng volunteered as a foot soldier.

He impressed the provincial government and local officials; therefore, he was promoted to Assistant Officer in the army, whose role was to manage the troops. His skills in battle against the rebels were further recognised and he was appointed as Major (軍司馬). For his merits, he was reassigned to Lieutenant-General (偏將軍) and General Who Subdues the West (征西將軍) stationed in the Shaanxi region.

However, when Geng Bi was killed in battle by the rebel army, Ma Teng switched sides and joined Han Sui. The rebellion was eventually suppressed by the Han general Huangfu Song but Ma Teng escaped along with the rebels. In the end, the central government granted military titles to some of the rebel leaders in order to appease them.

During the Chuping era (初平; 190–193) of the reign of Emperor Xian of Han, he was appointed as General Who Subdues the East (征東將軍). He remarked that the western regions were short of food and wrote a memorial to the court, asking for further provisions. He also moved his troops eastwards. However, the local General Wang Cheng and his subordinates feared he would harm them. Therefore, they attacked his camp. Ma Teng was surprised and not ready for the sudden betrayal; he was defeated and fled westward.

When Li Jue and Guo Si seized power over Chang'an after Dong Zhuo's assassination in May 192, Ma Teng and Han Sui at first pledged allegiance to them, and were appointed as General who Attacks the West (征西将軍) and General who Guards the West (鎮西将軍) respectively. However, the relationship between the two sides quickly soured, and Ma Teng and Han Sui led their armies in an attempt to seize Chang'an. They allied themselves with the warlord Liu Yan, but suffered defeats from the hands of Li Jue's forces led by Guo Si, Fan Chou and Li Li. Not only was the loss of 10,000 soldiers a heavy blow to the morale of the allied forces, they also faced a supply shortage at the time, so the eloquent Han Sui asked Fan Chou for a private talk, during which Han Sui successfully persuaded Fan Chou to abort the pursuit because they shared the same hometown. The allied forces then retreated back to Liang Province safely.

Ma Teng was initially on good terms with Han Sui; they were said to be as close as brothers. However, as conflict arose between their respective retainers, the two went to war against each other over control of Liang Province. The fighting escalated to a point where they became sworn enemies. Once, Ma Teng forced Han Sui to flee, but the latter came back and killed Ma Teng's wife and children. From then on, the conflict escalated.

Cao Cao, who at this point had decisively defeated Yuan Shao at the Battle of Guandu, and had Zhong Yao along with Wei Duan (韋端) brokered peace between Ma Teng and Han Sui, who then pledged allegiance to the Han dynasty and sent troops to assist Cao Cao in defeating Yuan Shao's successors and remnants. Ma Teng was appointed as General of the Vanguard (前將軍) and enfeoffed as the Marquis of Huaili (槐里侯).

While he was in the West, Ma Teng was known to have well defended his lands against aggressive tribes and bandits, caring for the learned scholars and promoting talented people, protected and treated generously the common people therefore he was greatly respected for his achievements.

In 208, (Note: There are conflicting records on when Ma Teng was made Minister of the Guards; the Dianlve recorded a date of 210, while Zhang Ji's biography in Sanguozhi recorded that Cao Cao sent Zhang to persuade Ma Teng before the Jing expedition, which took place in 208. In his Zizhi Tongjian Kaoyi, Sima Guang agreed with the record found in Zhang Ji's biography in Sanguozhi, and opinioned that the Dianlve erroneously recorded the year as the 15th year of the Jian'an era instead of the 13th (盖“三”字误为“五”耳。).) Cao Cao wanted to conquer Jing, but feared Ma Teng's influence in Guanzhong. He summoned Ma Teng to Ye city with most of his family and wanted them to disband their personal troops. Cao Cao sent Zhang Ji to persuade Ma Teng. As Ma Teng was still hesitant about this, Zhang Ji ordered the counties to prepare supplies for his arrival and had officials of high position sent to welcome him. Ma Teng had no choice but to go east. (Note: Ma Chao's biography in Sanguozhi also recorded that one reason why Ma Teng went east was his bad relationship with Han Sui.) Already in his old age, he was appointed Minister of the Guards (衛尉) while his younger sons, Ma Xiu (馬休) and Ma Tie (馬鐵), were appointed Commandant of Equipage (奉車都尉) and Commandant of Iron Cavalry (鐵騎都尉) respectively. His eldest son, Ma Chao, remained behind in Liang Province with Han Sui.

Around early 211, Cao Cao ordered Zhong Yao and Xiahou Yuan to pass through Guanzhong to attack Zhang Lu in Hanzhong. Ma Chao suspected this to be a feint to invade Liang Province. He formed a coalition with Han Sui and other minor warlords in Liang, and started a rebellion against the Han dynasty. While persuading Han Sui to join him, Ma Chao said, "[...] Now, I abandon my father, and I'm willing to acknowledge you as my father. You should also abandon your son, and treat me like your son." Cao Cao defeated Ma Chao and his coalition at the Battle of Tong Pass in September 211. In June or July 212, Emperor Xian issued an imperial decree ordering the execution of Ma Teng and the rest of his family who were with him in Ye city at the time.

== In Romance of the Three Kingdoms ==
In the 14th-century historical novel Romance of the Three Kingdoms, Ma Teng is portrayed as a loyalist of the declining Han dynasty. He participates in a plot with Liu Bei and Dong Cheng to assassinate Cao Cao, who is depicted as a villain monopolising power and holding Emperor Xian hostage. However, the plot is unsuccessful and Ma Teng returns to Liang Province.

When Ma Teng is later recalled to the imperial capital Xuchang, he decides to again join a plot to assassinate Cao Cao, this time with Huang Kui (黄奎). However, the plot is discovered and he is executed along with his sons Ma Xiu (馬休) and Ma Tie (馬鐵). Upon hearing of the death of his father and brothers, Ma Chao becomes filled with rage and goes to war with Cao Cao to avenge his family, starting the Battle of Tong Pass.

== In popular culture ==
Ma Teng is a warlord and playable character in the game Total War: Three Kingdoms. Ma Teng also appears in the Dynasty Warriors games, specifically 5 and 9.

== See also ==
- Lists of people of the Three Kingdoms
