= Wei Kang =

Chinese official and politician (died 213)

- 韋康

Inspector of Liang Province (涼州刺史)
- In office ? – 213
- Monarch: Emperor Xian of Han
- Chancellor: Cao Cao

Personal details
- Born: Unknown (Note: Wei Kang was older than Wei Dan, who was born in 179; the Taiping Guangji, citing Shu Duan, recorded that Wei Dan was 75 (by East Asian reckoning) when he died in the 5th year of the Jiaping era of Cao Fang's reign (c.253).) Xi'an, Shaanxi
- Died: 213 Gangu County, Gansu
- Relations: Wei Dan (younger brother)
- Parent: Wei Duan (father)
- Occupation: Politician
- Courtesy name: Yuanjiang (元將)

Wei Kang (died 213), courtesy name Yuanjiang, was a Chinese politician who lived in the late Eastern Han dynasty of China.

== Early life and career ==
Wei Kang was from Jingzhao Commandery (京兆郡), which is around present-day Xi'an, Shaanxi. His father, Wei Duan (韋端), initially served as the Governor (牧) of Liang Province (涼州), but was later recalled to the imperial capital to serve as Minister Coachman (太僕). Kong Rong once told Wei Duan, "Two days ago, Yuanjiang visited me. He is knowledgeable, talented, bright, elegant and resilient. He will become a great man." Wei Kang also had a younger brother, Wei Dan (韋誕), (Note: Wei Dan was also a master calligrapher. According to Hu Zhao's biography in Records of the Three Kingdoms, Wei Dan's calligraphy was widely emulated by others, alongside those of Hu, Handan Chun, Zhong Yao, and Wei Ji (卫觊; father of Wei Guan).) who served as a Household Counsellor (光祿大夫) in the Han imperial court. The Sanfu Juelu recorded that Wei Kang was already eight chi and five cun tall (approximately 1.96 metres) when he was just 14 years old.

Wei Kang was recommended by Xun Yu to join the Han civil service. He initially served as a Registrar (主簿) in Jingzhao Commandery. After Wei Duan was recalled to the imperial capital, Wei Kang took over his father's duties and served as the Inspector (刺史) of Liang Province. The people in Liang Province regarded him highly.

== Siege of Jicheng ==
In 211, a coalition of warlords from northwestern China, under the leadership of Ma Chao and Han Sui, started a rebellion in Liang Province against the Han central government, which was headed by Cao Cao. Cao Cao's forces defeated Ma Chao and the coalition at the Battle of Tong Pass.

In the subsequent years, Ma Chao, with support from the Qiang tribes and the warlord Zhang Lu, constantly raided and attacked the lands in Liang Province. At the time, Wei Kang was stationed in Liang Province's capital, Ji (兾; also called Jicheng, in present-day Gangu County, Gansu), which came under siege by Ma Chao. When reinforcements did not show up, Wei Kang sent his subordinate Yan Wen (閻溫) to report the situation to the general Xiahou Yuan and seek help, but Yan Wen was caught and executed by Ma Chao after refusing to surrender. Wei Kang and the defenders continued to put up a firm defence.

However, over time, the city gradually ran out of supplies and its defenders and civilian population began to suffer. Wei Kang took pity on the plight of the people and wanted to start peace talks with Ma Chao. Zhao Ang attempted to dissuade him from doing so but was ignored. Yang Fu also tearfully pleaded with Wei Kang to defend the city to the death. However, Wei Kang managed to conclude peace negotiations with Ma Chao, with both sides agreeing to end the conflict. Wei Kang then opened the city gates and surrendered. Ma Chao broke his promise later, killed Wei Kang, seized control of Liang Province, and forced Wei Kang's subordinates to submit to him.

== See also ==
- Lists of people of the Three Kingdoms
