= Battle of Ruxu (213) =

Battle between warlords Cao Cao and Sun Quan (213)

- Part of the wars at the end of the Han dynasty
Date	213
Location	Ruxu, Yang Province, on the eastern side of present-day Lake Chaohu, Anhui.
Result	Sun Quan overall victory; Cao Cao retreat

Belligerents
Cao Cao	Sun Quan

Commanders and leaders
Cao Cao; Sun Guan † (possibly in the 217 battle)	Sun Quan; Lü Meng

Strength
400,000	70,000

Battle of Ruxu
- Traditional Chinese: 濡須之戰
- Simplified Chinese: 濡须之战
Transcriptions
Standard Mandarin
- Hanyu Pinyin: Rúxū Zhī Zhàn

Battle of Ruxukou
- Traditional Chinese: 濡須口之戰
- Simplified Chinese: 濡须口之战
Transcriptions
Standard Mandarin
- Hanyu Pinyin: Rúxūkǒu Zhī Zhàn

The Battle of Ruxu, also known as the Battle of Ruxukou, was fought between the warlords Cao Cao and Sun Quan in 213 during the late Eastern Han dynasty of China. The battle consisted of multiple attacks led by Cao Cao, but all were eventually lifted after efforts by Sun Quan's forces.

== Background ==
Before 213, Cao Cao was waging war with Ma Chao and Sun Quan following his defeat during the Battle of Red Cliffs. One of the moves that Cao Cao wanted to make in his war against Sun Quan was to intimidate Sun Quan by stationing one of his officers, Xie Qi (謝奇), at Wancheng (皖城; present-day Qianshan County, Anhui) and spread his forces to Qichun County in order to agitate Sun Quan.

In order to stop Cao Cao's harassment, Sun Quan sent his general Lü Meng to demand Xie Qi surrender. Xie Qi refused, and Lü Meng attacked. Xie Qi went down easily and retreated. Two of Xie Qi's subordinates, Sun Zicai and Song Hao, surrendered to Lü Meng, boosting morale. Cao Cao then began to mobilise troops to attack Ruxu (濡須). He captured Gongsun Yang, an officer under Sun Quan. Sun Quan, in response, personally led an army to stop Cao Cao's advance towards Ruxu, and ordered Lü Meng to join him.

== The battle ==
Lü Meng came up with a defence plan against Cao Cao's attack consisting of warships readied at a quickly established dock, to be used to backfire Cao Cao's advance after a flood that was supposed to occur not long into the battle.

Sun Guan, who died in battle at Ruxu in either 213 or 217, was perhaps fatally injured in his attack onto Sun Quan's line of defence by Xu Sheng. Sun Guan died not long after his rescue at Cao Cao's camp.

Lü Meng's prediction quickly was proven correct, Sun Quan then started to send out his warships onto Cao Cao's army, but a few of their ships were blown off course, but not much. (This could have been the death of Dong Xi.) Having realised the experience of Sun's army, Cao Cao eventually decided to withdraw.

In a momentum burst, a few other generals of Sun Quan joined Lü Meng in a following assault onto Wancheng and Lujiang.

== Aftermath ==
Zhang Liao, following this withdrawal, stationed his troops at Hefei, where in 215 he played a major role in the Battle of Xiaoyao Ford.

== Order of battle ==
=== Cao Cao's forces ===
- Cao Cao, in command.
  - Sun Guan †?, perhaps attacked the front lines and was fatally injured by Xu Sheng. He died immediately after his attack in Cao Cao's main camp.
  - Zhu Guang, administrator of Wancheng, captured by Gan Ning afterwards.

=== Sun Quan's forces ===
- Sun Quan, in command.
  - Lü Meng, aided Sun Quan in the commanding of their forces. Came up with the plan to use the docks to their advantage.
    - Ling Tong, helped Lü Meng with Gan Ning to take Wancheng and Lujiang.
    - Gan Ning, helped Lü Meng with Ling Tong to take Wancheng and Lujiang.
  - Zhou Tai, helped protect Sun Quan's defence lines.
    - Xu Sheng, assisted Zhou Tai. Injured Sun Guan.
    - Zhu Ran, assisted Zhou Tai.
  - Dong Xi, possibly could have been involved and died during this battle.
