= Ma Dai =

3rd century State of Shu Han general

- 馬岱
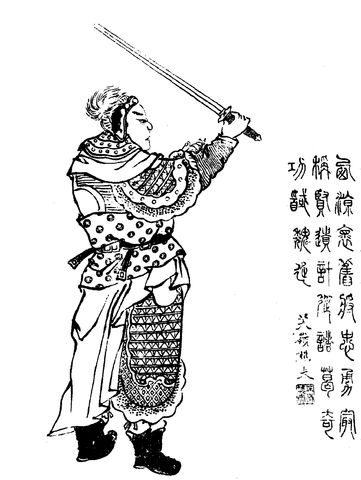
- A Qing dynasty illustration of Ma Dai

General Who Pacifies the North (平北將軍)
- In office ?–?
- Monarch: Liu Shan

Personal details
- Born: Unknown
- Died: Unknown
- Relatives: Ma Teng (uncle); Ma Chao (cousin)
- Occupation: Military general
- Peerage: Marquis of Chencang (陳倉侯)

Ma Dai (fl. 222–235) was a Chinese military general of the state of Shu Han during the Three Kingdoms period of China. He previously served under his uncle Ma Teng, a warlord in northwestern China, during the late Eastern Han dynasty. After Ma Teng's death, he followed his cousin Ma Chao (Ma Teng's eldest son) and they joined the warlord Zhang Lu in Hanzhong for a short period of time. Ma Chao later defected to another warlord Liu Bei, and Ma Dai accompanied him. Ma Dai served under Liu Bei and later in the state of Shu Han (founded by Liu Bei).

Not much information on Ma Dai is found in historical records. It is known that in 234, he participated in the fifth Northern Expedition led by Shu's chancellor Zhuge Liang to attack the Shu's rival state Cao Wei. Ma Dai was also credited with slaying the Shu general Wei Yan, who was alleged to have turned against Shu after the death of Zhuge Liang.

== Life ==
Ma Dai was a younger cousin of Ma Chao. He does not have a biography in the Records of the Three Kingdoms (Sanguozhi), the authoritative source for the history of the Three Kingdoms period; he is mentioned occasionally in the biographies of other people such as Ma Chao and Wei Yan. He is first mentioned in Ma Chao's biography in a letter written by Ma Chao to Liu Bei before his death. Ma Chao wrote: "Over 200 members of my family were killed by Cao Cao. I only have my cousin Ma Dai left with me. He will be the one to continue my family line. I entrust him to Your Majesty's care. That is all I have to say." Ma Dai served in the state of Shu Han as a military general. The highest position he attained was "General Who Pacifies the North" (平北將軍). He was also enfeoffed as the "Marquis of Chencang" (陳倉侯).

Ma Dai is mentioned in Wei Yan's biography. In 234, when conflict broke out between Yang Yi and Wei Yan after Zhuge Liang's death, Yang Yi ordered Ma Dai to attack Wei Yan. Ma Dai caught up with Wei Yan while the latter was fleeing towards Hanzhong, decapitated him, brought his head back, and threw it in front of Yang Yi.

Ma Dai is also briefly mentioned in Sima Yi's biography in the Book of Jin. In 235, he led Shu forces to attack Shu's rival state, Cao Wei, but was defeated and driven back by the Wei general Niu Jin. He lost about 1,000 troops in battle.

== In Romance of the Three Kingdoms ==
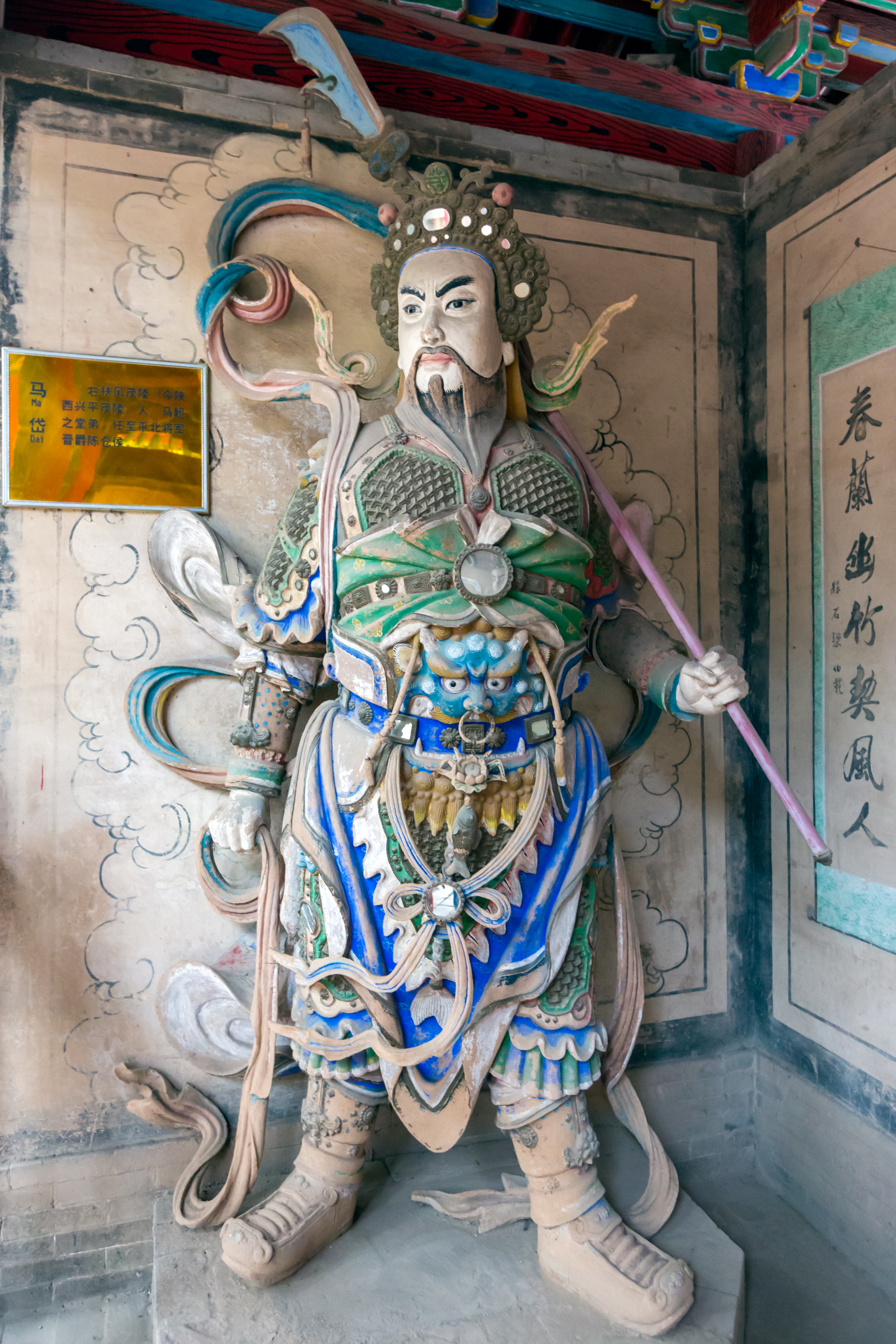
Statue of Ma Dai in the Zhuge Liang Memorial Temple in the Wuzhang Plains, Shaanxi

Ma Dai is a character in the 14th-century historical novel Romance of the Three Kingdoms, which romanticises the historical events and figures of the late Eastern Han dynasty and Three Kingdoms period. In the novel, he follows Ma Teng to the capital on a summon from Cao Cao, and survives when Ma Teng and his sons are killed by Cao Cao's men in a trap. He joins his cousin Ma Chao in the Battle of Tong Pass against Cao Cao, and accompanies Ma Chao when the latter is defeated and has to seek refuge under Zhang Lu of Hanzhong. He follows Ma Chao and comes to serve Liu Bei when his cousin defects to Liu Bei's side during the takeover of Yi Province. Ma Dai participates actively in southern campaign against the Nanman and the Northern Expeditions against the rival state of Cao Wei. After Zhuge Liang's death, the Shu general Wei Yan rebels, and Ma Dai pretends to support him but kills him later.

== In popular culture ==
Ma is sometimes venerated as a door god in Chinese and Taoist temples in Hebei, usually in partnership with Ma Chao.

Ma Dai is first introduced as a playable character in the seventh instalment of Koei's Dynasty Warriors video game series. He is characterized as Ma Chao's elder brother and keeper in the games. He, along with the rest of the Xiliang warriors of the time, appear alongside a unique cavalry unit in any level they are present, a reference to the Ma clan's namesake horsemanship.

== See also ==
- Lists of people of the Three Kingdoms
