= Ma Chao =

Chinese military general and warlord (176–222)

- 馬超
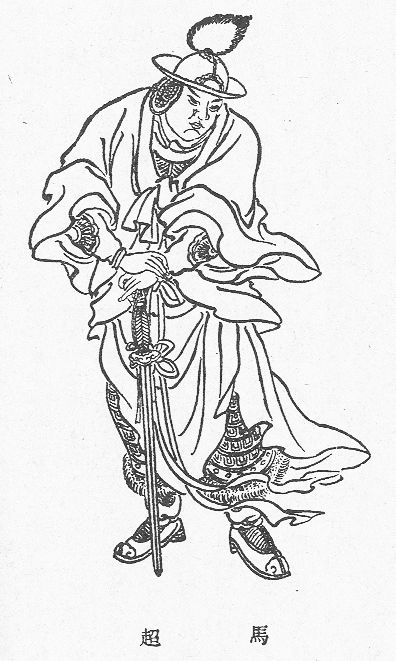
- A Qing dynasty illustration of Ma Chao

General of Agile Cavalry (驃騎將軍)
- In office 221 – 222
- Monarch: Liu Bei
- Chancellor: Zhuge Liang

Governor of Liang Province (涼州牧) (nominal)
- In office 221 – 222
- Monarch: Liu Bei
- Chancellor: Zhuge Liang

General of the Left (左將軍)
- In office 219 – 221
- Monarch: Liu Bei

General Who Pacifies the West (平西將軍) (under Liu Bei)
- In office 215 – 219
- Monarch: Emperor Xian of Han

General Who Attacks the West (征西將軍) (self-appointed)
- In office 213 – 215
- Monarch: Emperor Xian of Han

Lieutenant-General (偏將軍) (under Ma Teng)
- In office ? – 211
- Monarch: Emperor Xian of Han

Personal details
- Born: 176 (Note: Ma Chao's biography in the Sanguozhi recorded that he died in the 2nd year of the Zhangwu era of Liu Bei's reign at the age of 47 (by East Asian age reckoning). (Note: ([章武]二年卒，時年四十七。) Sanguozhi vol. 36.) By calculation, Ma Chao's year of birth should be 176.) Xingping, Shaanxi
- Died: 222 (aged 46)
- Spouses: Lady Yang; Lady Dong
- Children: Ma Qiu; Ma Cheng; Liu Li's wife; at least one other child
- Parent: Ma Teng (father)
- Relatives: Ma Xiu (brother); Ma Tie (brother); Ma Dai (cousin)
- Occupation: Military general
- Courtesy name: Mengqi (孟起)
- Posthumous name: Marquis Wei (威侯)
- Peerage: Marquis of Tai District (斄鄉侯)
- Nickname: "Ma Chao the Splendid" (錦馬超)

Ma Chao (176–222), courtesy name Mengqi, was a Chinese military general and warlord who lived in the late Eastern Han dynasty and early Three Kingdoms period of China. A descendant of the general Ma Yuan, Ma Chao was the eldest son of Ma Teng, a prominent warlord in Liang Province (covering parts of northwestern China). In 211, after Cao Cao moved forces west for a campaign against Zhang Lu, Ma Chao joined Han Sui and other northwestern warlords in resisting Cao Cao's advance. The coalition broke up after losing the Battle of Tong Pass against Cao Cao's forces. Ma Chao initially retreated, but later returned, captured Ji County, killed the provincial inspector Wei Kang, and forced Wei Kang's subordinates to submit. About a year after Ma Chao started his uprising, Emperor Xian issued an imperial decree ordering the execution of Ma Chao's family members, who were in Ye city at the time. In the meantime, Wei Kang's subordinates, led by Zhao Ang, Yang Fu and others, rebelled against Ma Chao and forced him out of Liang Province. Ma Chao retreated to Hanzhong Commandery, where he borrowed troops from the warlord Zhang Lu, and returned to attack Liang Province but was ultimately defeated and driven back. Ma Chao took shelter under Zhang Lu for a while until around 214, when he heard that the warlord Liu Bei was fighting for control over Yi Province (covering present-day Sichuan and Chongqing) with Yi Province's governor, Liu Zhang. He defected to Liu Bei, and his arrival outside Chengdu helped compel Liu Zhang to surrender. Ma Chao had served as a general under Liu Bei since then and participated in the Hanzhong Campaign in 219. He died in 222.

In the 14th-century historical novel Romance of the Three Kingdoms, Ma Chao is romanticised as a heroic warrior and one of the Five Tiger Generals under Liu Bei. In the novel, the descriptions of his character and personality, as well as the order of some events involving him, have been significantly modified for dramatic effect. For example, in the novel he started the Battle of Tong Pass to take revenge against Cao Cao for murdering his family, but historically he waged war against Cao Cao first, and then his family members were implicated and executed about one year later. In the novel, he also engaged Xu Chu and Zhang Fei in one-on-one duels at the Battle of Tong Pass and Battle of Jiameng Pass respectively, but historically the duels never took place and the Battle of Jiameng Pass is actually a fictional battle.

== Family background ==
Ma Chao was from Maoling County (茂陵縣), Youfufeng Commandery (右扶風郡), which is located northeast of present-day Xingping, Shaanxi. He was the eldest son of Ma Teng, who descended from Ma Yuan, a general who lived in the early Eastern Han dynasty. Ma Teng's father, Ma Ping (馬平), (Note: (獻帝傳曰：「騰父平，扶風人。為天水蘭干尉，失官，遂留隴西，與羌雜居。家貧無妻，遂取羌女，生騰。」) Xiandi Zhuan annotation in Houhanshu vol. 72.) whose courtesy name was Zishuo (子碩), served as a military officer in Tianshui Commandery (天水郡) during the reign of Emperor Huan. After losing his post, Ma Ping went to live among the Qiang tribes in the region, married a Qiang woman and had a son, Ma Teng. (Note: (典略曰：騰字壽成，馬援後也。桓帝時，其父字子碩，甞為天水蘭干尉。後失官，因留隴西，與羌錯居。家貧無妻，遂娶羌女，生騰。) Dianlue annotation in Sanguozhi vol. 36.) Ma Teng, along with Han Sui and others, were warlords who held considerable influence in Liang Province (covering parts of present-day Shaanxi and Gansu) towards the end of the Eastern Han dynasty and were reluctant to submit to Han rule. In 192, Ma Teng accepted the appointment of General Who Attacks the West (征西將軍) from the Han imperial court and garrisoned his army at Mei County (郿縣). However, he rebelled against the Han dynasty later and attacked the city of Chang'an but failed to conquer it so he retreated back to Liang Province. (Note: (馬超字孟起，右扶風茂陵人也。父騰，靈帝末與邊章、韓遂等俱起事於西州。初平三年，遂、騰率衆詣長安。漢朝以遂為鎮西將軍，遣還金城，騰為征西將軍，遣屯郿。後騰襲長安，敗走，退還涼州。) Sanguozhi vol. 36.)

== Early career ==
During the early Jian'an (建安; 196–220) era, Ma Teng and Han Sui battled against each other. Around age twenty, Ma Chao was famous for his strength and fought on his father's side. During a battle, Yan Xing stabbed him with his spear. As the spear broke, he used it to strike Ma Chao's neck and nearly killed him. (Note: (建安初，約與馬騰相攻擊。騰子超亦號為健。行嘗刺超，矛折，因以折矛撾超項，幾殺之。) Weilue annotation in Sanguozhi vol. 15.) Conflict between Ma Teng and Han Sui ended in 200, when Zhong Yao and Wei Duan (韋端) convinced them to reconcile. (Note: (建安之初，國家綱紀殆弛，乃使司隸校尉鍾繇、涼州牧韋端和解之。) Dianlue annotation in Sanguozhi vol. 36.)

In 197, the warlord Cao Cao – who had become the de facto head of the Han central government – placed Zhong Yao, the Colonel-Director of Retainers (司隷校尉), in charge of guarding the Guanzhong region. Zhong Yao wrote to Ma Teng and Han Sui, explaining to them the benefits of submitting to the Han court and the negative consequences of not doing so. (Note: (司隷校尉鍾繇鎮關中，移書遂、騰，為陳禍福。) Sanguozhi vol. 36.) When Cao Cao became the Imperial Chancellor (丞相), he wanted to recruit Ma Chao to serve in the Han government, but Ma refused. (Note: (初，曹公為丞相，辟騰長子超，不就。) Dianlue annotation in Sanguozhi vol. 36.)

In 202, when Cao Cao was on a series of campaigns to unify northern China after his victory over Yuan Shao at the Battle of Guandu two years earlier, he ordered Zhong Yao to attack Yuan's allies Gao Gan and Guo Yuan in Pingyang (平陽; in present-day Linfen, Shanxi). Ma Teng sent Ma Chao to assist Zhong Yao. Ma Chao served as an Assistant Officer Who Supervises the Army (督軍從事) under Zhong Yao. During the battle, he was hit by a stray arrow in the foot, but he wrapped his foot in a pouch and continued fighting. His subordinate Pang De slew Guo Yuan and they defeated the enemy. (Note: (超後為司隷校尉督軍從事，討郭援，為飛矢所中，乃以囊囊其足而戰，破斬援首。) Dianlue annotation in Sanguozhi vol. 36.) (Note: (騰遣超隨繇討郭援、高幹於平陽，超將龐德親斬援首。) Sanguozhi vol. 36.)

Ma Teng got into conflict with Han Sui later, so he requested to leave Liang Province and work in the capital. He was granted permission and appointed as the Minister of the Guards (衞尉) by the Han court. Ma Chao was appointed as a Lieutenant-General (偏將軍), made a Marquis of a Chief Village (都亭侯), and placed in charge of his father's troops in Liang Province. (Note: (後騰與韓遂不和，求還京畿。於是徵為衞尉，以超為偏將軍，封都亭侯，領騰部曲。) Sanguozhi vol. 36.) Ma Chao's younger brothers Ma Xiu (馬休) and Ma Tie (馬鐵) were appointed as a Commandant of Equipage (奉車都尉) and a Commandant of Iron Cavalry (鐵騎都尉) respectively, and were ordered to bring all their family members with them to Ye (in present-day Handan, Hebei). Only Ma Chao remained behind in Liang Province. (Note: (及騰之入，因詔拜為偏將軍，使領騰營。又拜超弟休奉車都尉，休弟鐵騎都尉，徙其家屬皆詣鄴，惟超獨留。) Dianlue annotation in Sanguozhi vol. 36.)

== Uprising against the Cao Cao-controlled Han Government ==
=== Battle of Tong Pass ===
In April 211, (Note: The Zizhi Tongjian recorded that Zhong Yao was sent to attack Hanzhong in the 3rd month of the 16th year of the Jian'an era of the reign of Emperor Xian of Han; the month corresponds to 1 to 30 Apr 211 in the Julian calendar. Gao Rou advised Cao that by sending a large army westwards, Ma Chao and Han Sui would believe that the army was targeted at them; they would then rise in rebellion. What Cao Cao should do was to first pacify the Guanzhong region; once the region is stabilised, Zhang Lu would surrender once an edict was issued to him. Cao Cao ignored Gao.) Cao Cao sent Zhong Yao and Xiahou Yuan to lead an army to attack Zhang Lu in Hanzhong Commandery. They were due to pass through the Guanzhong region along the way. Ma Chao suspected that Cao Cao was planning to attack him, so he contacted Han Sui to form an alliance. He told Han Sui, "Previously, Zhong Yao ordered me to harm you. Now, I know that the people from Guandong (east of Tong Pass) cannot be trusted. Now, I abandon my father, and I'm willing to acknowledge you as my father. You should also abandon your son, and treat me like your son." Han Sui's subordinate, Yan Xing, urged his superior not to cooperate with Ma Chao but Han still agreed to the alliance. (Note: (及約還，超謂約曰：「前鍾司隸任超使取將軍，關東人不可複信也。今超棄父，以將軍為父，將軍亦當棄子，以超為子。」行諫約，不欲令與超合。約謂行曰：「今諸將不謀而同，似有天數。」乃東詣華陰。) Weilue annotation in Sanguozhi vol. 15.) Ma Chao also contacted Yang Qiu, Li Kan (李堪), Cheng Yi (成宜), Hou Xuan (侯選), Cheng Yin (程銀), Zhang Heng (張橫), Liang Xing (梁興), Ma Wan (馬玩) and others, and they formed a 100,000 strong coalition army to attack Tong Pass (present-day Tongguan County, Shaanxi). (Note: (超旣統衆，遂與韓遂合從，及楊秋、李堪、成宜等相結，進軍至潼關。) Sanguozhi vol. 36.) (Note: (典略曰：建安十六年，超與關中諸將侯選、程銀、李堪、張橫、梁興、成宜、馬玩、楊秋、韓遂等，凡十部，俱反，其衆十萬，同據河、潼，建列營陣。) Dianlue annotation in Sanguozhi vol. 36.) Liu Zhang, the governor of Yi Province (covering present-day Sichuan and Chongqing), wanted to marry his daughter to Ma Chao to build ties with Ma, but Wang Shang (王商), a commandery administrator under Liu Zhang, opposed the idea and said that Ma Chao was courageous but inhumane and untrustworthy. (Note: (超勇而不仁，見得不思義，不可以為脣齒。) Sanguozhi vol. 38.)

Cao Cao led an army to Tong Pass to attack Ma Chao and the coalition, resulting in the Battle of Tong Pass. After both sides clashed in a few engagements, Cao Cao had talks with Ma Chao and Han Sui. Ma Chao relied on his great strength and secretly harboured the intention of dashing forth and capturing Cao Cao when they met. However, he did not dare to make his move when Xu Chu, one of Cao Cao's close aides, glared at him. Cao Cao later followed Jia Xu's strategy to sow discord between Ma Chao and Han Sui and make them become suspicious of each other. Taking advantage of the hostility between Ma Chao and Han Sui, Cao Cao launched an attack on the northwestern warlords and defeated them. (Note: (曹公與遂、超單馬會語，超負其多力，陰欲突前捉曹公，曹公左右將許褚瞋目眄之，超乃不敢動。 ... 曹公用賈詡謀，離間超、遂，更相猜疑，軍以大敗。) Sanguozhi vol. 36.) (Note: (是歲，曹公西征，與超等戰於河、渭之交，超等敗走。) Dianlue annotation in Sanguozhi vol. 36.)

Earlier on, when Cao Cao's forces were at Puban (蒲阪; east of present-day Dali County, Shaanxi) and were planning to cross the Wei River and head west, Ma Chao told Han Sui, "We should resist them at the north of the Wei River. Within 20 days, their supply stores on the east of the river will be depleted, after which they will definitely retreat." However, Han Sui rejected his idea and said, "We should send our forces to engage the enemy on the river. Isn't this more direct?" When Cao Cao heard of Ma Chao's plan, he remarked, "If the young horse (Note: Ma Chao's family name "Ma" literally means "horse".) doesn't die, I can't have a proper burial place." (Note: (山陽公載記曰：初，曹公軍在蒲阪，欲西渡，超謂韓遂曰：「宜於渭北拒之，不過二十日，河東穀盡，彼必走矣。」遂曰：「可聽令渡，蹙於河中，顧不快耶！」超計不得施。曹公聞之曰：「馬兒不死，吾無葬地也。」) Shanyang Gong Zaiji annotation in Sanguozhi vol. 36.)

=== Battles in Guanzhong ===
Ma Chao retreated further west after his defeat at Tong Pass. Cao Cao pursued him to Anding (安定; around present-day Pingliang, Gansu) but gave up on the pursuit and headed east after receiving news about unrest in northern China. Yang Fu warned Cao Cao, "Ma Chao has the courage of Han Xin and Ying Bu, and both the Qiang and Rong peoples deeply respect him. If we retreat now and don't station defences here, we'll forfeit all the territories in this area." After Cao Cao left, as Yang Fu predicted, Ma Chao led the various tribes in the region to attack the commanderies and counties in Guanzhong, while the people responded to his call and joined him in the revolt. Ma Chao killed Wei Kang, the Inspector (刺史) of Liang Province, and seized control of Liang Province's capital Jicheng (兾城; in present-day Gangu County, Gansu) and forced Wei Kang's subordinates to submit to him. He then appointed himself General Who Attacks the West (征西將軍) and Governor (牧) of Bing Province, and took charge of military affairs in Liang Province. (Note: (超走保諸戎，曹公追至安定，會北方有事，引軍東還。 ... 楊阜說曹公曰：「超有信、布之勇，甚得羌、胡心。若大軍還，不嚴為其備，隴上諸郡非國家之有也。」 ... 超果率諸戎以擊隴上郡縣，隴上郡縣皆應之，殺涼州刺史韋康，據兾城，有其衆。超自稱征西將軍，領并州牧，督涼州軍事。) Sanguozhi vol. 36.)

While Ma Chao besieged Wei Kang, Xiahou Yuan wanted to lead reinforcements to help him but arrived too late as Ji had already fallen to Ma Chao with Xiahou Yuan still more than 200 li away from Ji. Ma Chao led an army out to face Xiahou Yuan who would prove unable to defeat Ma Chao and decided to withdraw his troops when he heard that the Di tribes in Qian County (汧縣) had started a rebellion. (Note: (馬超圍涼州刺史韋康於兾，淵救康，未到，康敗。去兾二百餘里，超來逆戰，軍不利。汧氐反，淵引軍還。) Sanguozhi vol. 9.)

Wei Kang's former subordinates – Yang Fu, Jiang Xu, Liang Kuan (梁寬), Zhao Qu (趙衢) and others – were unhappy with Ma Chao so they plotted to get rid of him. Yang Fu and Jiang Xu rebelled against Ma Chao in Lucheng (鹵城; in present-day southeastern Gansu), while the others in Jicheng pretended to urge Ma to suppress the revolt. Ma Chao followed their advice and led an army to attack Lucheng but could not conquer the city. When he returned to Jicheng, he saw that Liang Kuan and Zhao Qu had closed the city gates and barred him from entering. (Note: (康故吏民楊阜、姜叙、梁寬、趙衢等合謀擊超。阜、叙起於鹵城，超出攻之，不能下；寬、衢閉兾城門，超不得入。) Sanguozhi vol. 36.) Zhao Qu and the others also killed Ma Chao's wife and child(ren) in Jicheng. (Note: (十九年，趙衢、尹奉等謀討超，姜叙起兵鹵城以應之。衢等譎說超，使出擊叙，於後盡殺超妻子。) Sanguozhi vol. 9.)

In the summer of 212, about a year after Ma Chao rebelled against the Cao Cao controlled Han court, Cao Cao forced Emperor Xian to issue a decree ordering the execution of Ma Chao's father Ma Teng and the rest of his family who were with him at the time in Ye (in present-day Handan, Hebei). (Note: (超至安定，遂奔涼州。詔收滅超家屬。超復敗於隴上。) Dianlue annotation in Sanguozhi vol. 36.) (Note: (十七年夏五月癸未，誅衞尉馬騰，夷三族。) Houhanshu vol. 9.)

Ma Chao fled to Hanzhong, where he borrowed troops from the warlord Zhang Lu, and returned to attack those who drove him out of Guanzhong. He besieged Jiang Xu, Zhao Ang and their allies at Mount Qi (祁山; the mountainous regions around present-day Li County, Gansu) for about 30 days until reinforcements led by Cao Cao's generals Xiahou Yuan and Zhang He showed up and lifted the siege. (Note: (超奔漢中，還圍祁山。叙等急求救，諸將議者欲須太祖節度。淵曰：「公在鄴，反覆四千里，比報，叙等必敗，非救急也。」遂行，使張郃督步騎五千在前，從陳倉狹道入，淵自督糧在後。郃至渭水上，超將氐羌數千逆郃。未戰，超走，郃進軍收超軍器械。淵到，諸縣皆已降。) Sanguozhi vol. 9.) (Note: (遂共閉門逐超，超奔漢中，從張魯得兵還。異復與昂保祁山，為超所圍，三十日救兵到，乃解。超卒殺異子月。凡自兾城之難，至于祁山，昂出九奇，異輒參焉。) Lie Nü Zhuan annotation in Sanguozhi vol. 25.)

== Service under Zhang Lu ==
Ma Chao returned to Hanzhong Commandery after his defeat at Mount Qi and sought shelter under Zhang Lu. (Note: (進退狼狽，乃奔漢中依張魯。) Sanguozhi vol. 36.) Zhang Lu planned to marry his daughter to Ma Chao, but one of Zhang's aides advised him against it, saying, "If a person can't even love his family and relatives, can he still love others?" Zhang Lu then aborted his plan. (Note: (後奔漢中，張魯以為都講祭酒，欲妻之以女，或諫魯曰：「有人若此不愛其親，焉能愛人？」魯乃止。) Dianlue annotation in Sanguozhi vol. 36.)

On one New Year's Day, a relative of Ma Chao who had also escaped to Hanzhong came to visit him. Ma Chao beat his chest, coughed blood, and said to his relative, "A big family with over a hundred members all sharing the same fate in one day. Now, are there only the two of us to give greetings to each other?" (Note: (初，超未反時，其小婦弟种留三輔，及超敗，种先入漢中。正旦，种上壽於超，超搥胷吐血曰：「闔門百口，一旦同命，今二人相賀邪？」) Dianlue annotation in Sanguozhi vol. 36.)

Ma Chao constantly asked Zhang Lu to give him some troops to attack Liang Province. Zhang Lu agreed, but Ma Chao failed to make any gains from the campaign. Yang Bai (楊白), an officer under Zhang Lu, was jealous of Ma Chao's ability and wanted to harm him. When Ma Chao heard about it, he escaped from Wudu (武都; around present-day Longnan, Gansu) and went to live with the Di people around the area. (Note: (後數從魯求兵，欲北取涼州，魯遣往，無利。又魯將楊白等欲害其能，超遂從武都逃入氐中， ...) Dianlue annotation in Sanguozhi vol. 36.)

== Service under Liu Bei ==
Around 214, the warlord Liu Bei was fighting for control over Yi Province with the provincial governor Liu Zhang. Ma Chao distrusted Zhang Lu and felt that he was not capable of great achievements, so he planned to defect to Liu Bei. When he heard that Liu Bei was besieging Liu Zhang in Chengdu (Yi Province's capital), he wrote a secret letter to Liu Bei, expressing his desire to serve the latter. Liu Bei was pleased to receive Ma Chao's letter and he exclaimed, "Yi Province is mine." He then sent Li Hui to meet Ma Chao and provide supplies and additional troops to Ma, after which Ma led his forces to the north of Chengdu and joined the siege. When the people of Chengdu saw Ma Chao and his troops below the city walls, they were greatly demoralized and fearful. Within ten days of Ma Chao's arrival, Liu Zhang gave up resistance and surrendered to Liu Bei. (Note: (魯不足與計事，內懷於邑，聞先主圍劉璋於成都，密書請降。 ... 先主遣人迎超，超將兵徑到城下。城中震怖，璋即稽首， ...) Sanguozhi vol. 36.) (Note: (先主嘉之，從至雒城，遣恢至漢中交好馬超，超遂從命。) Sanguozhi vol. 43.) (Note: (... 轉奔往蜀。是歲建安十九年也。 ... 典略曰：備聞超至，喜曰：「我得益州矣。」乃使人止超，而潛以兵資之。超到，令引軍屯城北，超至未一旬而成都潰。) Dianlue annotation in Sanguozhi vol. 36.)

After occupying Yi Province, Liu Bei appointed Ma Chao as General Who Pacifies the West (平西將軍) and put him in charge of Linju (臨沮; northeast of present-day Yuan'an County, Hubei). Liu Bei defeated Cao Cao in the Hanzhong Campaign in 219 and declared himself "King of Hanzhong" (漢中王), after which he appointed Ma Chao as General of the Left (左將軍). (Note: (... 以超為平西將軍，督臨沮，因為前都亭侯。 ... 先主為漢中王，拜超為左將軍，假節。) Sanguozhi vol. 36.)

In 221, Liu Bei declared himself emperor and established the state of Shu Han. He appointed Ma Chao as General of Agile Cavalry (驃騎將軍) and Governor (牧) of Liang Province. Ma Chao was enfeoffed as the Marquis of Tai District (斄鄉侯). (Note: (章武元年，遷驃騎將軍，領涼州牧，進封斄鄉侯， ...) Sanguozhi vol. 36.) Liu Bei's imperial edict to Ma Chao was as follows:

"I am unworthy, but I have ascended the throne to preserve the Han dynasty. Cao Cao and Cao Pi will be remembered for their sins. I am disconsolate by their wrongdoings. The people loathe them and hope that the Han dynasty will be restored, with the Di, Qiang, Xunyu and other ethnic minorities willingly submitting to our rule. The northerners look up to you, and your valour is well known among them. I have an important task for you. I hope you will use your influence to govern the northern border well and bring prosperity to the people there. You must show them the benefits of our government, and be impartial in rewarding the good and punishing the evil. You have the blessings of the Han emperors, and you must not let the people down." (Note: (... 策曰：「朕以不德，獲繼至尊，奉承宗廟。曹操父子，世載其罪，朕用慘怛，疢如疾首。海內怨憤，歸正反本，曁于氐、羌率服，獯粥慕義。以君信著北土，威武並昭，是以委任授君，抗颺虓虎，兼董萬里，求民之瘼。其明宣朝化，懷保遠邇，肅慎賞罰，以篤漢祐，以對于天下。」) Sanguozhi vol. 36.)

=== Peng Yang's case ===
When Peng Yang, an official under Liu Bei, was about to leave Chengdu to assume his new appointment in Jiangyang, he visited Ma Chao and told him: "You are outside while I am inside. The Empire can be pacified." Ma Chao had recently joined Liu Bei's forces and he was often fearful that he would get into trouble. After hearing what Peng Yang told him, he was shocked as he thought that Peng Yang was asking him to participate in a coup d'état against Liu Bei. However, he remained silent and did not respond. After Peng Yang left, Ma Chao secretly reported him and caused him to be arrested and executed. (Note: (羕聞當遠出，私情不恱，往詣馬超。超問羕曰：「卿才具秀拔，主公相待至重，謂卿當與孔明、孝直諸人齊足並驅，寧當外授小郡，失人本望乎？」羕曰：「老革荒悖，可復道邪！」又謂超曰：「卿為其外，我為其內，天下不足定也。」超羇旅歸國，常懷危懼，聞羕言大驚，默然不荅。羕退，具表羕辭，於是收羕付有司。 ... 羕竟誅死，時年三十七。) Sanguozhi vol. 40.)

=== Conflict with Guan Yu and Zhang Fei ===
The Shanyang Gong Zaiji (山陽公載記; Records of the Duke of Shanyang), by Yue Zi (樂資), recorded an incident as follows:

Ma Chao saw that Liu Bei treated him very generously after he defected to his side, so he often addressed Liu Bei by his courtesy name ("Xuande") when he spoke to him. Guan Yu was furious when he heard about it (because he saw Ma Chao as being disrespectful) so he asked Liu Bei to execute Ma Chao. However, Liu Bei said, "He was in dire straits when he came to join me. Why are you so angry about this? How can I ever explain myself if I executed someone just because he called me by my courtesy name?" Zhang Fei agreed, "Yes, you should show civility towards him." The following day, Liu Bei invited Ma Chao to attend a banquet. Guan Yu and Zhang Fei stood nearby and carried swords. After Ma Chao took his seat, he was surprised to see that Guan Yu and Zhang Fei were still standing. After that, he never called Liu Bei by his courtesy name again. The following day, he sighed, "Now I know why he (Liu Bei) suffered defeats. I was almost killed by Guan Yu and Zhang Fei just because I called my lord by his courtesy name." From then on, he behaved more humbly in front of Liu Bei. (Note: (山陽公載記曰：超因見備待之厚，與備言，常呼備字，關羽怒，請殺之。備曰：「人窮來歸我，卿等怒，以呼我字故而殺之，何以示於天下也！」張飛曰：「如是，當示之以禮。」明日大會，請超入，羽、飛並杖刀立直，超顧坐席，不見羽、飛，見其直也，乃大驚，遂止不復呼備字。明日歎曰：「我今乃知其所以敗。為呼人主字，幾為關羽、張飛所殺。」自後乃尊事備。) Shanyang Gong Zaiji annotation in Sanguozhi vol. 36.)

Pei Songzhi, who annotated Ma Chao's biography in the Sanguozhi, disputed the Shanyang Gong Zaiji account as untruthful and nonsensical. He commented as follows:

I believe Ma Chao would not have behaved so arrogantly in front of Liu Bei to the extent of calling him by his courtesy name. After all, he was on the run before Liu Bei accepted him and granted him official titles. Besides, when Liu Bei entered Yi Province, he left Guan Yu behind to defend Jing Province, so Guan Yu had never stepped into Yi Province before. When Guan Yu heard that Ma Chao had joined Liu Bei's forces, he wrote a letter (from Jing Province) to Zhuge Liang to ask him, "Who can compete with Ma Chao?" This account says something completely different. How was it possible that Guan Yu and Zhang Fei actually stood side by side (in Yi Province)? When a normal person does something, he will do it if he knows he can. If he knows he cannot, he will not do it. If Ma Chao really did address Liu Bei by his courtesy name, he would be aware of the circumstances under which he could do so. Ma Chao should not even know that Guan Yu asked Liu Bei to execute him. How was it possible that Ma Chao managed to deduce that Guan Yu and Zhang Fei wanted to kill him for calling their lord by his courtesy name just by seeing them standing nearby and carrying swords? This is totally absurd and illogical. The records written by Yuan Wei (袁暐) (Note: Yuan Wei (袁暐) wrote the Xiandi Chunqiu (獻帝春秋; Chronicles of Emperor Xian), which was also used by Pei Songzhi in his annotations to the Sanguozhi.) and Yue Zi are disorganised, unreliable and nonsensical. Their works should not even be mentioned. (Note: (臣松之按，以為超以窮歸備，受其爵位，何容傲慢而呼備字？且備之入蜀，留關羽鎮荊州，羽未甞在益土也。故羽聞馬超歸降，以書問諸葛亮「超人才可誰比類」，不得如書所云。羽焉得與張飛立直乎？凡人行事，皆謂其可也，知其不可，則不行之矣。超若果呼備字，亦謂於理宜爾也。就令羽請殺超，超不應聞，但見二子立直，何由便知以呼字之故，云幾為關、張所殺乎？言不經理，深可忿疾也。袁暐、樂資等諸所記載，穢雜虛謬，若此之類，殆不可勝言也。) Pei Songzhi's annotation in Sanguozhi vol. 36.)

== Death ==
Ma Chao died in 222 at the age of 47 (by East Asian age reckoning). His cause of death was not recorded in history. Before his death, he wrote to Liu Bei: "Over 200 members of my family were killed by Cao Cao. I only have my cousin Ma Dai left with me. He will be the one to continue my family line. I entrust him to Your Majesty's care. That is all I have to say." In October or November 260, Liu Bei's son and successor, Liu Shan, granted Ma Chao the posthumous title "Marquis Wei" (威侯). (Note: (二年卒，時年四十七。臨沒上疏曰：「臣門宗二百餘口，為孟德所誅略盡，惟有從弟岱，當為微宗血食之繼，深託陛下，餘無復言。」追謚超曰威侯， ...) Sanguozhi vol. 36.) (Note: (三年秋九月，追謚故將軍關羽、張飛、馬超、龐統、黃忠。) Sanguozhi vol. 33.)

== Family and relatives ==
Ma Chao's title, Marquis of Tai District (斄鄉侯), was inherited by his son, Ma Cheng (馬承). Ma Chao's daughter married Liu Bei's son Liu Li (劉理), the Prince of Anping (安平王). (Note: (... 子承嗣。 ... 超女配安平王理。) Sanguozhi vol. 36.)

Ma Chao had at least two spouses. The first was Lady Yang (楊氏), who was with him when he seized control of Liang Province after the Battle of Tong Pass. (Note: ([馬]超妻楊聞[王]異節行，請與讌終日。) Lie Nü Zhuan annotation in Sanguozhi vol. 25.) She probably bore Ma Chao at least one child, because the Sanguozhi mentioned that Zhao Qu (趙衢), Yin Feng (尹奉) and others killed Ma's family (wife and child(ren)) when they rebelled against him and drove him out of Liang Province. Ma Chao had a second wife, Lady Dong (董氏), who bore him a son, Ma Qiu (馬秋). When Ma Chao escaped from Zhang Lu and defected to Liu Bei, he left them behind in Hanzhong Commandery. Zhang Lu was later defeated by Cao Cao, to whom he surrendered. Cao Cao gave Lady Dong to Yan Pu (閻圃), a former adviser to Zhang Lu, and gave Ma Qiu to Zhang Lu. Zhang Lu personally killed Ma Qiu. (Note: (典略曰：初超之入蜀，其庶妻董及子秋，留依張魯。魯敗，曹公得之，以董賜閻圃，以秋付魯，魯自手殺之。) Dianlue annotation in Sanguozhi vol. 36.) It is not known who the mother(s) of Ma Chao's two other children (Ma Cheng and the daughter) were, but she (or they) was probably neither Lady Yang nor Lady Dong.

Ma Chao's younger cousin, Ma Dai, served as a general in Shu Han. His highest appointment was General Who Pacifies the North (平北將軍) and he was also enfeoffed as the Marquis of Chencang (陳倉侯). (Note: (岱位至平北將軍，進爵陳倉侯。) Sanguozhi vol. 36.)

Ma Ying-jeou, the President of Taiwan from 2008 to 2016, is an alleged descendant of Ma Chao. Researchers purportedly visited the old residence of Ma's father, Ma Ho-ling, in Kaiyun Town, Hengshan County, Hunan, where they discovered a genealogy book stating that Ma descended from Ma Chao.

== Appraisal ==
Ma Chao was known for his exceptional strength (Note: (騰子超亦號為健。) Weilue annotation in Sanguozhi vol. 15.) (Note: (超負其多力) Sanguozhi vol. 36.) and for the great admiration he possessed among the ethnic tribes of the North. (Note: (「暨于氐、羌率服，獯鬻慕義。以君信著北土，威武並昭，」) Sanguozhi vol. 36.) (Note: (「超有信、布之勇，甚得羌、胡心」) Sanguozhi vol. 36.) Chen Shou, who wrote Ma Chao's biography in the Sanguozhi, commented on him as such: "Ma Chao relied solely on his relation with the foreign tribes (Xirong people) and his martial valor yet caused the extermination of his entire clan. What a great pity! However, he was able to break free from danger and finally reach peace, did all of his actions led him to a better fate?" (Note: (馬超阻戎負勇，以覆其族，惜哉！能因窮致泰，不猶愈乎！) Sanguozhi vol. 36.)

Guan Yu once wrote to Zhuge Liang to ask who could compete with Ma Chao when he heard that Ma had recently joined Liu Bei's force. Zhuge Liang replied, "Mengqi (Ma Chao) is proficient in both civil and military affairs. He is fierce and mighty, and a hero of his time. He is comparable to Qing Bu and Peng Yue. He can compete with Yide, but is not as good as the peerless beard." (Note: (亮知羽護前，乃荅之曰：「孟起兼資文武，雄烈過人，一世之傑，黥、彭之徒，當與益德並驅爭先，猶未及髯之絕倫逸羣也。」) Sanguozhi vol. 36.) (Note: The "peerless beard" referred to Guan Yu because Guan was known for sporting a beard regarded as beautiful in his time.) (Note: (羽美鬚髯，故亮謂之髯。) Sanguozhi vol. 36.)

Yang Fu, one of the officials who opposed Ma Chao in Liang Province, once visited his colleague and relative Jiang Xu and Jiang Xu's mother. He lamented about Ma Chao's murder of Wei Kang and forceful occupation of Liang Province: "[...] Ma Chao betrayed his father, rebelled against the Emperor, and massacred the officers in our province. [...] Ma Chao is strong but iniquitous. He is morally weak and susceptible to temptation and trickery." Yang Fu, Jiang Xu and several others later plotted against Ma Chao and drove him out of Liang Province. Ma Chao fought his way into Licheng (歷城) and captured Jiang Xu's mother. She scolded him, "You're an unfilial son who betrays his own father and a treacherous villain who murders his superior. Heaven and Earth will not forgive you. You should die immediately. How dare you look at me straight in the eye!" Ma Chao was furious and he killed her. (Note: (阜內有報超之志，而未得其便。頃之，阜以喪妻求葬假。阜外兄姜叙屯歷城。阜少長叙家，見叙母及叙，說前在兾中時事，歔欷悲甚。叙曰：「何為乃爾？」阜曰：「守城不能完，君亡不能死，亦何面目以視息於天下！馬超背父叛君，虐殺州將，豈獨阜之憂責，一州士大夫皆蒙其恥。君擁兵專制而無討賊心，此趙盾所以書殺君也。超彊而無義，多釁易圖耳。」 ... 叙母慨然，勑叙從阜計。計定，外與鄉人姜隱、趙昂、尹奉、姚瓊、孔信、武都人李俊、王靈結謀，定討超約，使從弟謨至兾語岳，并結安定梁寬、南安趙衢、龐恭等。約誓旣明，十七年九月，與叙起兵於鹵城。超聞阜等兵起，自將出。而衢、寬等解岳，閉兾城門，討超妻子。超襲歷城，得叙母。叙母罵之曰：「汝背父之逆子，殺君之桀賊，天地豈乆容汝，而不早死，敢以面目視人乎！」超怒，殺之。) Sanguozhi vol. 25.)

Yang Xi, who wrote the Ji Han Fuchen Zan (季漢輔臣贊; pub. 241), a collection of praises of notable persons who served in the Shu Han state, appraised him as follows: "General of Agile Cavalry (驃騎將軍; Ma Chao) rose up, formed alliances, started an uprising in the Three Qins, and conquered the river and Tong Pass. He rebelled against the imperial court, regardless of whether his followers agreed or disagreed with him. In doing so, he provided an opportunity for the enemy to sow discord between him and his men, resulting in the destruction of his family and forces. He defied morals and ethics, and ended up having to rely on dragons and phoenixes." (Note: "Rely on dragons and phoenixes" or tuo feng pan long (託鳳攀龍) is an archaic Chinese idiom used to refer to a person who heavily relies on nobles or wealthy and influential people.) (Note: (驃騎奮起，連橫合從，首事三秦，保據河、潼。宗計於朝，或異或同，敵以乘舋，家破軍亡。乖道反德，託鳳攀龍。－－贊馬孟起) Sanguozhi vol. 45.)

The Jin dynasty historian Sun Sheng compared Ma Chao's betrayal of his father Ma Teng to other historical examples of extreme cruelty and inhumaneness, including:

- the conflict between the Zhou dynasty and the vassal state of Zheng in 720 BCE, following the death of King Ping of Zhou;
- in 203 BCE, after Xiang Yu captured Liu Bang's father and threatened to boil him alive if Liu Bang did not surrender, but then Liu Bang asked Xiang Yu to share a bowl of his father's flesh with him;
- Wei Ao (隗嚣) raising troops against Liu Xiu (Emperor Guangwu of Han) despite his son being a political hostage at Liu's court; Liu later killed Wei's son. (Note: (孫盛曰： ... 是以周、鄭交惡，漢高請羹，隗嚻捐子，馬超背父，其為酷忍如此之極也，安在其因質委誠，取任永固哉？) Sun Sheng's annotation in Sanguozhi vol. 24. "嚻" is an alternate form of "囂"; both "隗" (wěi, kuí) and "囂" (áo, xiāo) have multiple pronunciations.)

== In Romance of the Three Kingdoms ==
Ma Chao is featured as a prominent character in some chapters in the 14th-century historical novel Romance of the Three Kingdoms. However, in the novel, the descriptions of his character and personality, as well as the order of some events involving him, had been modified to very large extents for dramatic effect. In the novel, he was nicknamed "Ma Chao the Splendid" for his elaborate armour and grand skill as a warrior, and was one of the Five Tiger Generals under Liu Bei.

Ma Chao is introduced in Chapter 10, where he participates in a campaign led by his father and Han Sui against Li Jue and Guo Si in Chang'an in 192, during which he slays the enemy officers Wang Fang (王方) and Li Meng (李蒙). He does not reappear until Chapter 57, in which he suggests to his father that he could lead the army against Cao Cao at Xuchang in 211 to follow Emperor Xian's orders to slay Cao Cao, but his father tells him to remain in Liang Province and command the Qiang troops there. After his father is killed by Cao Cao, Ma Chao, Han Sui and another eight officers fight against Cao Cao at the Battle of Tong Pass, during which Ma Chao fights with Cao Cao's generals Xu Chu, Yu Jin, Cao Hong and Zhang He, and slays Li Tong. Later, Cao Cao's strategist, Jia Xu, suggests to Cao Cao to send a letter containing errors and markings (making it seem as though the recipient has something to hide) to Han Sui to make Ma Chao falsely believe that Han Sui is maintaining secret contact with Cao Cao. Ma Chao gradually becomes more suspicious of Han Sui, who also has the intention of defecting to Cao Cao's side after learning that Ma Chao no longer trusts him. Han Sui manages to escape when Ma Chao tries to kill him, but his left hand is cut off by Ma during the fight. Ma Chao is eventually defeated by Cao Cao's forces, but manages to escape and find shelter among the Qiang tribes.

Ma Chao later joins forces with Zhang Lu to attack Cao Cao, but fails to make any significant gains. Zhang Lu, who distrusts Ma Chao, sends Yang Bo to spy on Ma, but Yang Bo is later killed. Ma Chao then helps Liu Zhang, the governor of Yi Province, deal with an invasion on Yi Province by Liu Bei. He duels with Liu Bei's sworn brother, Zhang Fei, at the Battle of Jiameng Pass. Later, he is convinced by Li Hui to defect to Liu Bei, who accepts him and makes him a general. He fights for Liu Bei in the Hanzhong Campaign and is later posted to Xiping, where he defends Liu Bei's strongholds from the Xianbei chieftain Kebineng.

Although Ma Chao historically died in 222, in the novel, he is mentioned to be still alive during Zhuge Liang's southern campaign against the Nanman and is in charge of guarding Hanzhong from possible attacks by the state of Cao Wei. He died of illness after Zhuge Liang returned from the campaign. Zhuge Liang tells Zhao Yun that Ma Chao's death felt like the loss of an arm to him.

== In popular culture ==
Ma is sometimes venerated as a door god in Chinese and Taoist temples in Hebei and Henan, usually in partnership with Ma Dai or Zhao Yun.

Ma Chao appears as a strong general in Koei's Romance of the Three Kingdoms strategy game series.

Ma Chao appears as a playable character in Koei's Dynasty Warriors and Warriors Orochi video game series.

In the collectible card game Magic: The Gathering, there is a card named "Ma Chao, Western Warrior" in the Portal Three Kingdoms set.

He appeared as a playable character in Total War: Three Kingdoms, being featured as the heir of Ma Teng's faction.

== See also ==
- Lists of people of the Three Kingdoms
