= Tianshui Commandery =

Historic commandery of China

Tianshui Commandery (Chinese: 天水郡), known as Hanyang Commandery (Chinese: 漢陽郡) during the Eastern Han dynasty, was a historical commandery of China in eastern Gansu. The modern city of Tianshui receives its name from the commandery.

== History ==
The commandery was established from lands of Longxi and Beidi commanderies in 114 BC. In 2 AD, the commandery had 16 counties: Pingxiang (平襄), Jiequan (街泉), Rongyidao (戎邑道), Wangyuan (望垣), Hanjian (罕幵), Mianzhudao (綿諸道), Ayang (阿陽), Lueyangdao (略陽道), Ji (冀), Yongshi (勇士), Chengji (成紀), Qingshui (清水), Fengjie (奉捷), Long (隴), Huandao (豲道) and Langan (蘭干). The total population was 261,348 (60,370 households). The name was changed to Hanyang in 74 AD. The Eastern Han census in 140 AD documented a population of 130,138 (27,423 households), and the number of counties was 13.

The name "Tianshui" was restored during the Cao Wei. In 280 AD, it administered 6 counties and the population was 8,500 households. During the Northern Wei, it was split into Tianshui and Hanyang commanderies.

During the Sui and Tang dynasties, Tianshui Commandery was an alternative name for Qin Prefecture. The commandery administered 6 counties, and had a population 52,130 households.
