= Gangu County =

Gangu County 甘谷县
- County
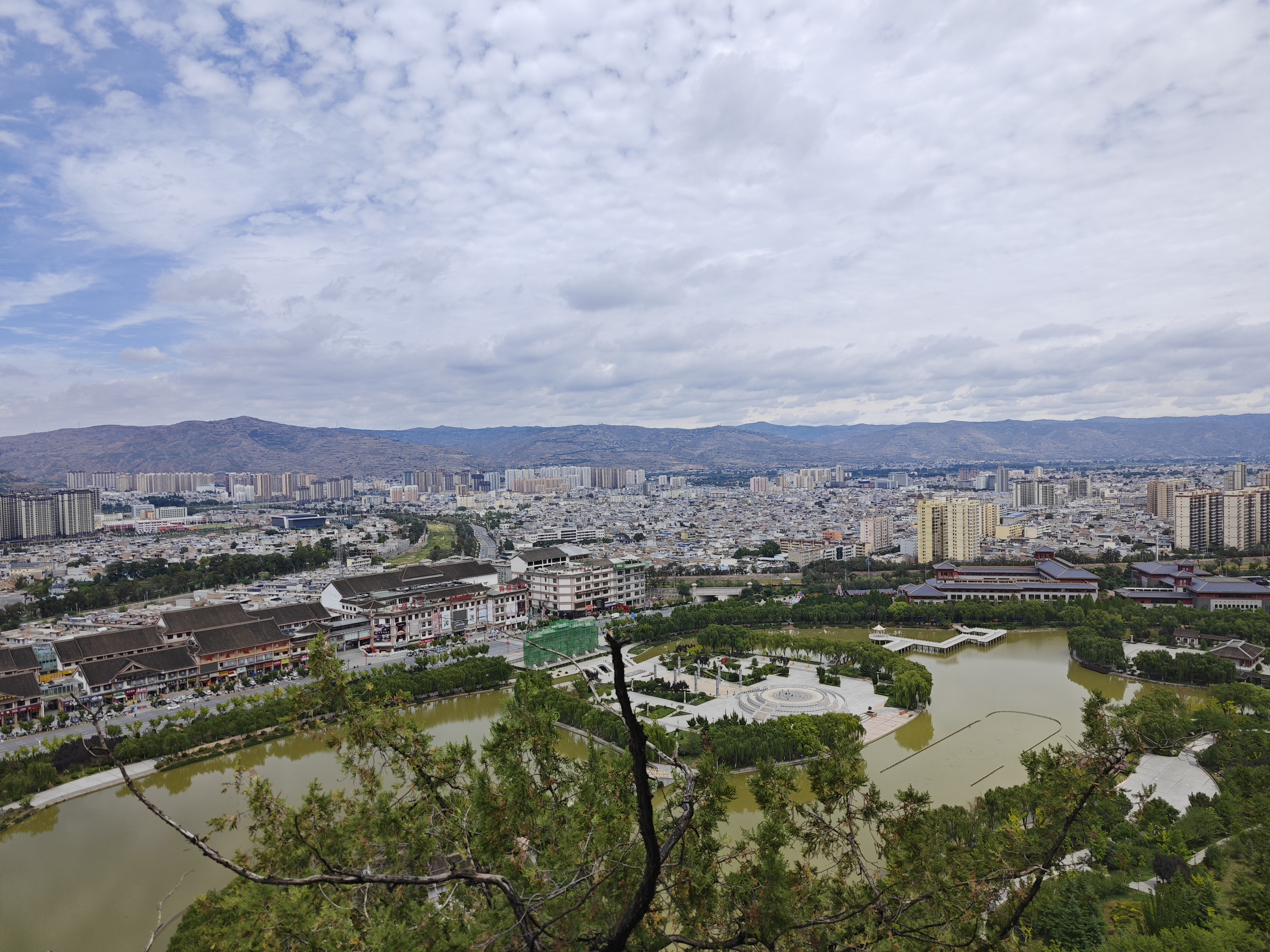
- Daxiang'shan (seat of Gangu county), 2025

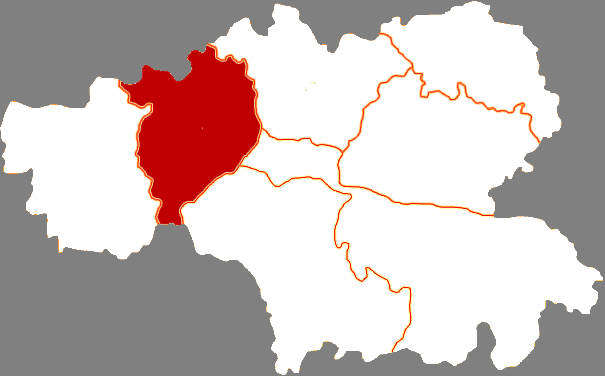
- Gangu in Tianshui

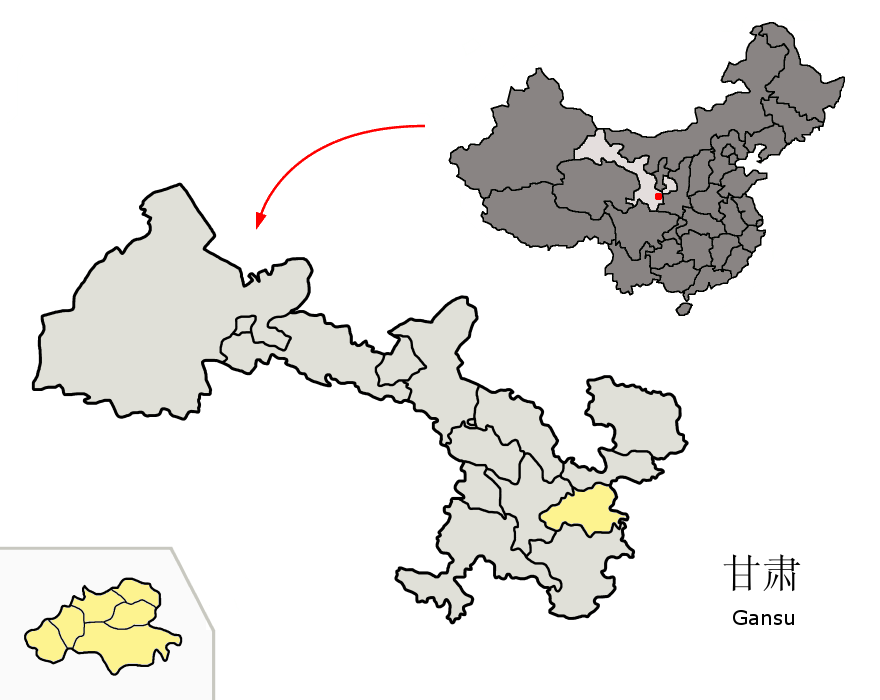
- Tianshui in Gansu
- Coordinates: 34°44′43″N 105°20′27″E
- Country: China
- Province: Gansu
- Prefecture-level city: Tianshui
- County seat: Daxiangshan

Area
  - County: 1,572.6 km^{2} (607.2 sq mi)
  - Urban: 18 km^{2} (6.9 sq mi)
- Highest elevation: 2,716 m (8,911 ft)
- Lowest elevation: 1,228 m (4,029 ft)

Population (2017)
  - County: 575,500
  - Density: 366.0/km^{2} (947.8/sq mi)
- Time zone: UTC+8 (China Standard)
- Postal code: 741200

Gangu County (Chinese: 甘谷县; pinyin: Gāngǔ Xiàn) is a county in the southeast of Gansu province, China. It is under the administration of Tianshui City and is the most populous county in Gansu. Its postal code is 741200, and in 1999 its population was 570,318 people.

It was established by Duke Wu of Qin in 688 BC as Ji County (冀县), this has led it to be called the 'oldest Chinese county. Gangu was a stop on the Silk Road, as a tea and horse market, and as a stopover for traders. It remains a regional trading centre.

Between 1958 and 1962, Gangu and Wushan County were merged.

== Culture ==
Gangu is known for its pepper variety, sold in China as Gangu pepper. Local culture includes Wushu martial arts and the sculpturing of animal ornaments on traditional Chinese roofs.

== Administrative divisions ==
Gangu County is divided to 13 towns and 2 townships.

Towns

- Daxiangshan (大像山镇)
- Xinxing (新兴镇)
- Pan'an (磐安镇)
- Liufeng (六峰镇)
- Anyuan (安远镇)
- Jinshan (金山镇)
- Dashi (大石镇)
- Lixin (礼辛镇)
- Wujiahe (武家河镇)
- Dazhuang (大庄镇)
- Gupo (古坡镇)
- Baliwan (八里湾镇)
- Xiping (西坪镇)

Townships

- Xiejiawan Township (谢家湾乡)
- Baijiawan Township (白家湾乡)

== Climate ==
Climate data for Gangu, elevation 1,272 m (4,173 ft), (1991–2020 normals, extremes 1981–present)
Month	Jan	Feb	Mar	Apr	May	Jun	Jul	Aug	Sep	Oct	Nov	Dec	Year
Record high °C (°F)	12.5 (54.5)	20.2 (68.4)	27.4 (81.3)	31.0 (87.8)	33.3 (91.9)	35.8 (96.4)	38.3 (100.9)	35.7 (96.3)	34.8 (94.6)	27.2 (81.0)	20.7 (69.3)	13.2 (55.8)	38.3 (100.9)
Mean daily maximum °C (°F)	3.8 (38.8)	7.7 (45.9)	13.8 (56.8)	20.1 (68.2)	23.9 (75.0)	27.5 (81.5)	29.4 (84.9)	28.0 (82.4)	22.5 (72.5)	16.8 (62.2)	10.8 (51.4)	5.1 (41.2)	17.5 (63.4)
Daily mean °C (°F)	−2.2 (28.0)	1.8 (35.2)	7.4 (45.3)	13.2 (55.8)	17.1 (62.8)	21.0 (69.8)	23.3 (73.9)	22.0 (71.6)	17.0 (62.6)	11.1 (52.0)	4.6 (40.3)	−1.0 (30.2)	11.3 (52.3)
Mean daily minimum °C (°F)	−6.4 (20.5)	−2.5 (27.5)	2.4 (36.3)	7.2 (45.0)	11.0 (51.8)	15.2 (59.4)	18.1 (64.6)	17.2 (63.0)	12.9 (55.2)	6.9 (44.4)	0.4 (32.7)	−5.1 (22.8)	6.4 (43.6)
Record low °C (°F)	−17.7 (0.1)	−14.4 (6.1)	−9.5 (14.9)	−3.1 (26.4)	−0.2 (31.6)	4.6 (40.3)	9.1 (48.4)	7.2 (45.0)	2.8 (37.0)	−6.0 (21.2)	−11.0 (12.2)	−16.9 (1.6)	−17.7 (0.1)
Average precipitation mm (inches)	5.2 (0.20)	6.6 (0.26)	15.8 (0.62)	26.8 (1.06)	53.5 (2.11)	66.2 (2.61)	77.4 (3.05)	75.5 (2.97)	61.6 (2.43)	37.4 (1.47)	9.3 (0.37)	2.3 (0.09)	437.6 (17.24)
Average precipitation days (≥ 0.1 mm)	4.5	5.0	6.8	7.3	10.1	10.6	10.6	10.4	11.7	9.7	5.0	2.4	94.1
Average snowy days	8.0	6.9	3.2	0.5	0	0	0	0	0	0.4	2.2	4.5	25.7
Average relative humidity (%)	63	61	57	56	60	63	66	70	76	77	74	66	66
Mean monthly sunshine hours	156.7	142.9	176.4	207.3	215.7	205.1	215.7	201.1	136.1	132.3	140.8	160.7	2,090.8
Percentage possible sunshine	50	46	47	53	50	47	49	49	37	38	46	53	47
Source: China Meteorological Administration all-time extreme temperature all-time extreme temperatureall-time January high (also occurred in January 1966)

== Famous residents ==
- Jiang Wei (202-264), general
- Yang Fu (Han dynasty), politician
- Shi Yanjue, president of the Buddhist Association of China

== See also ==
- List of administrative divisions of Gansu
