= Liang Province =

Province in the northwest of ancient China

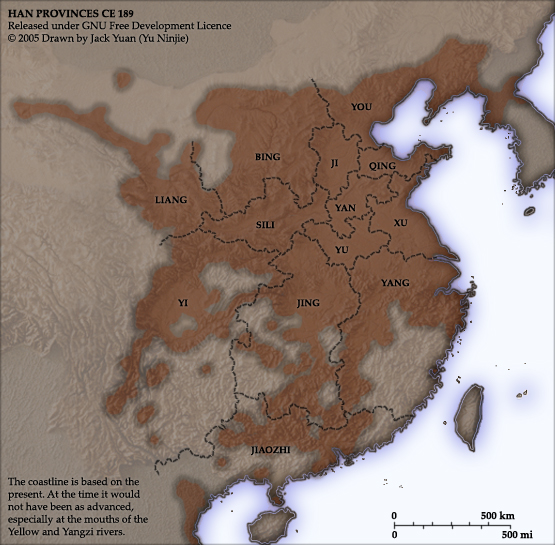
Provinces of the Eastern Han dynasty in 189 CE.

Liang Province or Liangzhou (涼州) was a province in the northwest of ancient China, in the approximate location of the modern-day province of Gansu. It was bordered in the east by Sili Province.

== History ==
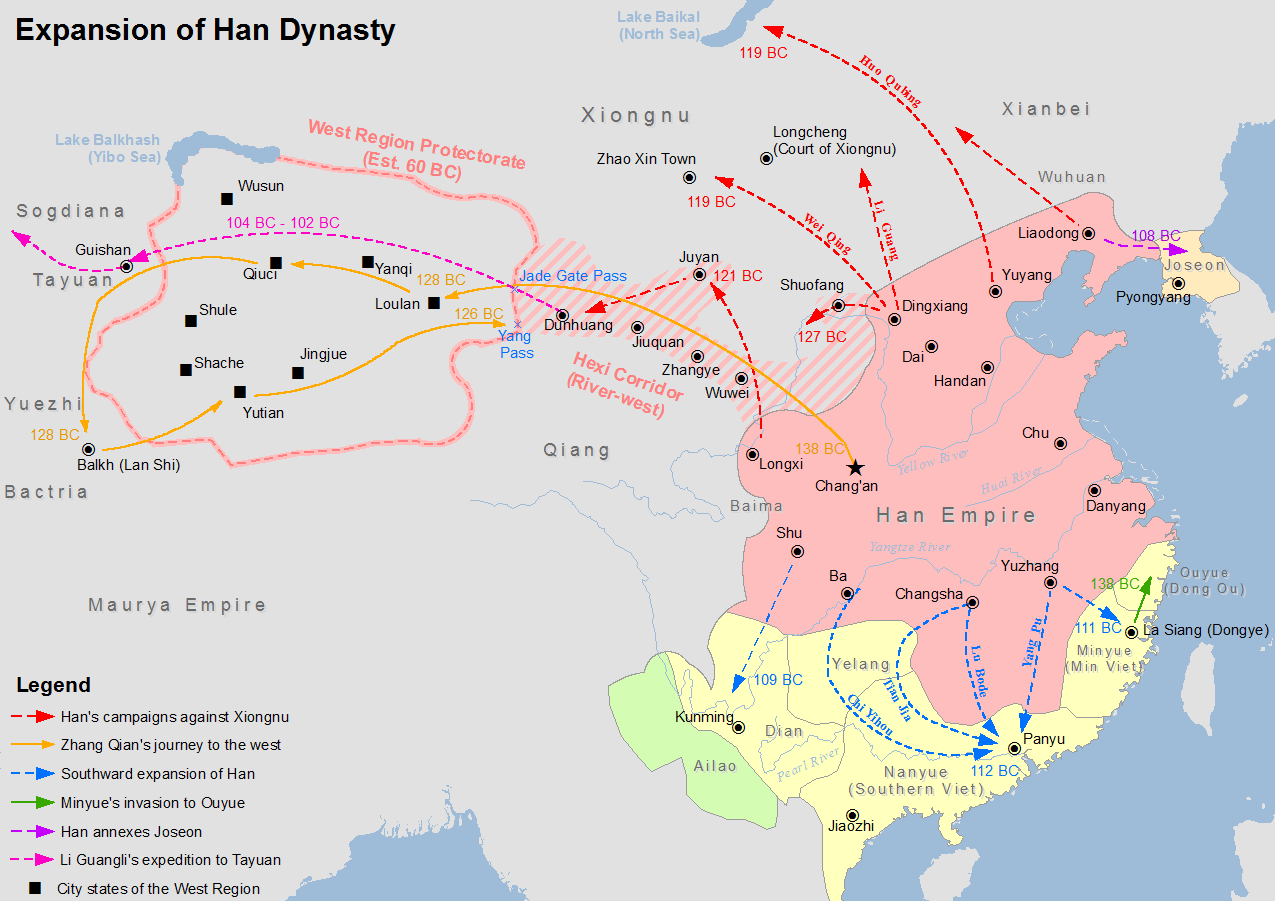
Map of the Han–Xiongnu War.

=== Establishment ===
The province was first conquered by the Han Chinese in the 120s BCE during the Han–Xiongnu War, and settled in the decades thereafter. The Hexi Corridor served to connect China proper with the Western Regions, which helped secure important parts of the Silk Road into Central Asia.

=== Qiang rebellions ===
In 107 CE, the Xianlian Qiang rebelled against Han authority. After heavy fighting, and proposals to abandon Liang Province, this First Great Qiang Rebellion was quelled in 118. Efforts were made to resettle the province from 129 to 144, although large parts of Liang remained without effective government. General Duan Jiong conducted another successful campaign against Qiang rebels in 167–169, committing a massacre at Shoot-Tiger Valley.

=== End of Han rule ===
In 184, concurrent with the outbreak of the Yellow Turban Rebellion in large parts of China, the Liang Province rebellion commenced. Han campaigns to retake the area remained inconclusive, and by 189 Liangzhou was a de facto independent warlord state ruled by Han Sui and Ma Teng. Warlord Cao Cao started an offensive against Liang Province in 211, winning a key victory in the Battle of Tong Pass (211), and finally conquering the entire province in 215.
