= Battle of Tong Pass =

Battle between warlord Cao Cao and coalition from Guanxi (211)

- Part of the wars at the end of the Han dynasty
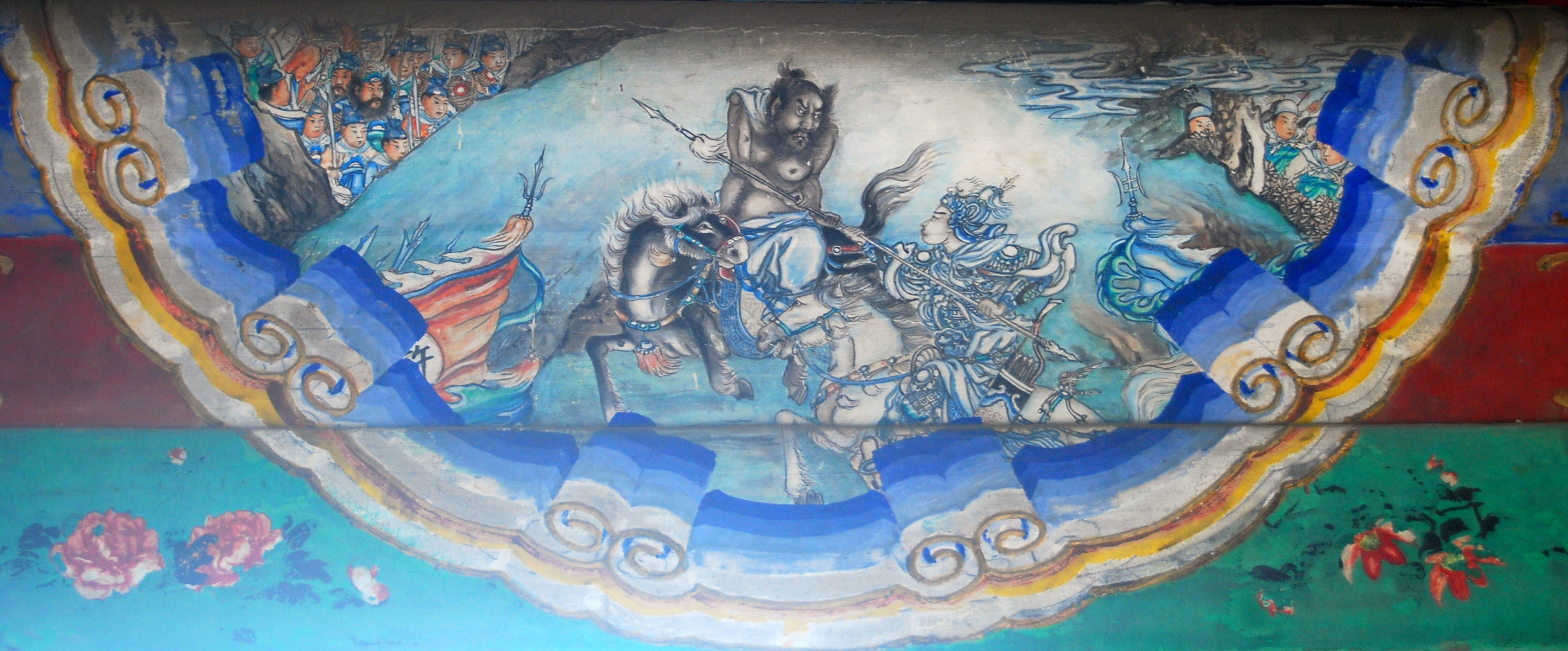
- The fictional duel between Xu Chu and Ma Chao, portrait at the Long Corridor of the Summer Palace, Beijing
Date	c. April – November 211 (Note: The Zizhi Tongjian recorded that the Battle of Tong Pass took place between the third and ninth months of the 16th year of the Jian'an era of the reign of Emperor Xian of the Eastern Han dynasty. This period corresponds to 1 April to 22 November 211 in the Gregorian calendar.)
Location	Tong Pass (in present-day Tongguan County, Shaanxi, China)
Result	Cao Cao victory

Belligerents
Cao Cao	Coalition of Guanxi forces

Commanders and leaders
Cao Cao; Cao Ren; Xu Huang; Zhang He; Xu Chu; Jia Xu; Zhu Ling	Ma Chao; Han Sui; Hou Xuan; Cheng Yin; Yang Qiu; Li Kan †; Zhang Heng; Liang Xing; Cheng Yi †; Chenggong Ying

Strength
60,000	100,000

Battle of Tong Pass
- Traditional Chinese: 潼關之戰
- Simplified Chinese: 潼关之战
Transcriptions
Standard Mandarin
- Hanyu Pinyin: Tóngguān zhī zhàn

Battle of Weinan
- Traditional Chinese: 渭南之戰
- Simplified Chinese: 渭南之战
Transcriptions
Standard Mandarin
- Hanyu Pinyin: Wèinán zhī zhàn

The Battle of Tong Pass, also known as the Battle of Weinan, (Note: "Weinan" means "south of the Wei (River)". Much of the fighting in the battle took place at the southern bank of the Wei River.) was fought between the warlord Cao Cao and a coalition of forces from Guanxi (Note: west of Tong Pass) between April and November 211 in the late Eastern Han dynasty of China. The battle was initiated by Cao Cao's western expansion, which triggered uprisings in Guanxi. Cao Cao scored a decisive victory over the Guanxi coalition and established a hold of the Guanzhong region.

== Background ==
Towards the end of the Eastern Han dynasty, the warlord Ma Teng commanded a sizable army in the northwestern frontiers of China that threatened the North China Plain under the dominion of Cao Cao. When Cao Cao finished his unification of northern China in 207, he wished to turn south to attack the warlords Liu Bei and Sun Quan. To avoid a potential attack from behind, Cao Cao appointed Ma Teng as an official and summoned him to Ye (Note: in present-day Handan, Hebei). Ma Teng and some of his family members were effectively held hostage to prevent Ma Teng's son, Ma Chao, from invading Cao Cao's territory.

Cao Cao's southern expedition failed and he was defeated by the combined forces of Sun Quan and Liu Bei at the Battle of Red Cliffs in 208. He turned his attention west instead and prepared to invade the Guanzhong region.

In April 211, Cao Cao ordered Zhong Yao to lead an army against the warlord Zhang Lu in Hanzhong Commandery and sent Xiahou Yuan at the head of another force from Hedong Commandery to support Zhong Yao. Gao Rou cautioned Cao Cao against such a move, saying that sending troops west could draw suspicion from the warlords in the area and cause them to revolt.

The various warlords in the Guanzhong region feared that Cao Cao would to attack them because Zhong Yao's army would pass by the Guanzhong region on the way to Hanzhong Commandery. As soon as Zhong Yao's army entered Guanzhong, the warlords, under the leadership of Ma Chao and Han Sui, formed a coalition (Note: known as the "Guanxi Coalition", or "coalition from the west of Tong Pass") and rebelled against the Han imperial court. The warlords included Hou Xuan (侯選), Cheng Yin (程銀), Yang Qiu, Li Kan (李堪), Zhang Heng (張橫), Liang Xing (梁興), Cheng Yi (成宜), and Ma Wan (馬玩). The coalition comprised a mixture of Han Chinese, Qiang, and Hu soldiers. Many counties in the area joined the uprising. Some civilians escaped to Hanzhong via Ziwu Valley (子午谷) to avoid the war.

In response, Cao Cao sent Cao Ren against the coalition at Tong Pass (in present-day Tongguan County, Shaanxi) and gave strict orders to his generals to refrain from engaging the enemy.

== Crossing of the Wei River ==
In late July or August 211, Cao Cao personally led an army against the rebels; he probably left behind his son Cao Pi to guard his base in Ye (in present-day Handan, Hebei). (Note: Cao Pi was made General of the Household for All Purposes (五官中郎将) and Vice Imperial Chancellor (副丞相) in that year, per his biography in Sanguozhi. It was probable that he was given the important task of guarding Ye.) Some of his subordinates advised him: "The Guanxi soldiers are warlike and they specialise in using long spears. Only an elite vanguard force can stop them." Cao Cao replied: "I am in charge of the war, not the rebels. They may be skilled in using long spears, but I will make them unable to use their spears. Gentlemen, just watch."

Upon reaching Tong Pass, Cao Cao ordered Xu Huang and Zhu Ling to lead their units across the Wei River via Puban Ford (蒲阪津) at night and set up a camp on the west bank. (Note: In his Zizhi Tongjian Kaoyi, Sima Guang pointed out that Xu Huang's biography in Sanguozhi attributed the two generals crossing Puban Ford to Xu Huang's advice. Sima opinioned that Chen Shou created this contradiction in his attempts to praise both Cao Cao and Xu Huang in their respective biographies.) While Cao Cao and his men were preparing to cross the Wei River to the north bank, they suddenly came under attack by Ma Chao's forces, but Cao remained seated and refused to move. Zhang He and the other officers saw that the situation was very critical, so they led Cao Cao on board a ferry. As the river current was very strong, Cao Cao's vessels quickly sailed four or five li away from the south bank. Ma Chao ordered his troops to rain arrows upon the enemy boats. Ding Fei (丁斐), a colonel under Cao Cao, had released the cattle and horses to distract the enemy, so the Guanxi soldiers immediately gave up on attacking and started to seize whatever livestock they could lay their hands on. Cao Cao's officers were worried and panicky when they lost sight of their lord during the chaos, and they shed tears of joy when they reunited with him later. Cao Cao laughed and remarked: "I was almost trapped by that little scoundrel today!"

== Construction of sand walls ==
After crossing the river, Cao Cao and his forces then headed south along the riverbank. The coalition retreated and made camp along the Wei River. Cao Cao set up many decoys to confuse the enemy while secretly sending troops to sail across the river and construct pontoon bridges. His forces crossed the river that night and built camps on the south bank. On the same night, the coalition attacked but were driven back by ambush forces deployed earlier by Cao Cao. Ma Chao and his allies also garrisoned at the south bank and they sent a messenger to meet Cao Cao, requesting to give up the territories west of the river in exchange for peace, but Cao Cao refused.

In late October or November 211, Cao Cao's forces attempted to cross the Wei River again, but came under attack by Ma Chao and his cavalry each time they tried to cross. Their camps were not stable and they could not build ramparts because the terrain was too sandy. Lou Gui suggested to Cao Cao: "The weather is cold. We can mix sand with water and use the mixture to construct walls. They will be ready after one night." Cao Cao heeded Lou Gui's suggestion and ordered his troops to work through the night to build the walls, which were ready by the following day. Cao Cao and his forces were hence able to cross the Wei River while the enemy was kept at bay by the walls. Ma Chao led his men to attack the walls but were repelled by Cao Cao's ambushes.

However, there have been suspicions that the building of the sand walls did not actually occur, because the incident took place in late autumn or early winter (late October to November) and the weather was probably not cold enough to cause water to freeze. The fifth-century historian Pei Songzhi commented that the Wei Shu stated that Cao Cao's army reached Tong Pass in late August or September 211, and crossed the Wei River to the north bank in late September or October. The weather could not possibly be that cold in late autumn (late September to October) to cause water to freeze.

== Cao Cao sowing discord between the coalition members ==
Ma Chao and the coalition repeatedly challenged Cao Cao to come out and engage them in battle but Cao ignored them. The rebels then offered to cede territories and send a hostage to Cao Cao's side in exchange for peace. As suggested by Jia Xu, Cao Cao pretended to agree to accept their offer.

Han Sui had a meeting with Cao Cao later. Han Sui's father and Cao Cao were nominated as xiaolian (civil service candidates) in the same year, while Cao and Han were also former colleagues when they were working in the old capital Luoyang. When they met at close quarters (Note: They were on horseback and their steeds were side by side but facing opposite directions.), they spoke nothing about military affairs and had a mere lighthearted conversation about old times. When Han Sui returned to his camp later, Ma Chao asked him: "What did Cao Cao say?" Han Sui replied: "Nothing." Ma Chao and the others became suspicious of Han Sui.

When Cao Cao was going to meet Han Sui again later (Note: The other coalition members were with Han this time.), his subordinates cautioned him: "My lord, when you meet the rebels, you may not be able to leave easily. How about using wooden horses as barriers?" Cao Cao agreed to their suggestion and spoke to Han Sui and his allies from behind the barriers. The coalition members greeted Cao Cao when they met him while their soldiers pushed their way forward to get a closer look at him. Cao Cao laughed and said: "You wish to see how I look like? I am also an ordinary person. I don't have four eyes or two mouths, but I am more intelligent." Cao Cao had brought along 5,000 armoured horsemen and instructed them to arrange themselves in an impressive formation. The rebel forces were shocked when they saw this display of military might by Cao Cao.

Some days later, Cao Cao wrote a letter to Han Sui which contained several "amendments", making it seem as though the recipient had deliberately edited the letter's contents to cover up something. Ma Chao and the others became even more suspicious of Han Sui after they saw the letter. In the meantime, Cao Cao was preparing for war with the coalition. He sent lightly armed troops to attack first, and then dispatched his elite cavalry to launch a pincer attack. Cao Cao scored a major victory over the coalition: Cheng Yi, Li Kan, and others were killed in action; Yang Qiu fled to Anding Commandery (安定郡; around present-day Pingliang, Gansu); Ma Chao and Han Sui retreated back to Liang Province. The Guanzhong region was pacified.

== Aftermath ==
In late November or December 211, Cao Cao led an army from Chang'an to attack Yang Qiu and his forces besieged Anding Commandery (安定郡; around present-day Pingliang, Gansu). Yang Qiu surrendered and was allowed to retain his former titles and remain in his domain to pacify the people there.

Ma Chao retreated further west after his defeat at Tong Pass. Cao Cao pursued him to Anding Commandery but gave up on the pursuit after two months and headed back to Ye (in present-day Handan, Hebei) upon receiving news about unrest in northern China. He left Xiahou Yuan behind to defend Chang'an.

About a year after Ma Chao rebelled against the Han imperial court, Emperor Xian issued a decree ordering the execution of Ma Chao's family members in Ye.

After Cao Cao left, Ma Chao led the various tribes in the region to attack the commanderies and counties in Guanzhong, while the people responded to his call and joined him in the revolt. In 213, Ma Chao killed Wei Kang, the Inspector of Liang Province, seized control of Jicheng (兾城) and forced Wei Kang's subordinates to submit to him. He took control of Liang Province. Wei Kang's former subordinates were unhappy with Ma Chao so they plotted to get rid of him. Later that year, they rebelled against him and succeeded in driving him out of Guanzhong.

Ma Chao fled to Hanzhong, where he borrowed troops from the warlord Zhang Lu, and returned to attack those who drove him out of Guanzhong. He besieged Jiang Xu, Zhao Ang, Wang Yi, and their allies at Mount Qi (祁山; the mountainous areas around present-day Li County, Gansu) for about 30 days until reinforcements led by Cao Cao's generals Xiahou Yuan and Zhang He showed up and lifted the siege.

== Cao Cao's analysis of the battle ==
After the battle, Cao Cao's officers asked their lord: "Earlier on, when the rebels were at Tong Pass, the north of the Wei River was not guarded. Why didn't you attack Pingyi (馮翊) from the east bank, and instead choose to defend Tong Pass and cross the river later?" Cao Cao replied, "The rebels were at Tong Pass. If I went to the east bank, they would definitely increase their defences at the fords and we wouldn't be able to cross over to the west. Hence, I chose to deploy our forces at Tong Pass so that the rebels would concentrate their defences on the south bank and lower their guard in the west. This was why our two generals (Note: referring to Xu Huang and Zhu Ling) were able to capture the west bank first, after which our main army crossed over to the north bank. The rebels were unable to fight for control of the west bank with us because our two generals had already occupied the area. When I gave orders for our carts to be linked together, wooden fences to be erected as defensive structures, and for our army to head south along the riverbank, I knew that we couldn't win then so I decided to display our weakness to the enemy. When we crossed the river back to the south bank and built solid walls, I didn't allow our men to engage the enemy because I wanted the enemy to become overconfident. As such, the rebels didn't attack our walls and instead requested to cede territories in exchange for peace. I pretended to agree so that they would be at ease and would not be on guard while our troops prepared for battle. When we attacked, it was indeed a case of 'a sudden crash of thunder leaves no time for one to cover his ears'. There are more than one way to how the situation on a battlefield can change."

Earlier on, during the battle, whenever Cao Cao received news of the arrival of enemy forces, he would express joy. After the battle, his officers asked him why, to which he replied: "Guanzhong is a very vast area. If the rebels garrisoned at the various strategic locations and we attack (all those places one by one), it would take a year or two to defeat all of them. However, they gathered (at Tong Pass) instead. They may have had superiority in numbers, but they were very disunited and they lacked a suitable leader, so they could be defeated in one strike. I was happy because it turned out to be much easier (than I expected)."

== In Romance of the Three Kingdoms ==
In the 14th century historical novel Romance of the Three Kingdoms, Chapters 58 and 59 are dedicated to this battle.

Ma Chao rallied an army to attack Cao Cao in revenge after Cao murdered his father Ma Teng and younger brothers Ma Xiu and Ma Tie.

Cao Cao was defeated by Ma Chao in the first skirmish of the battle. In the midst of the chaos, Cao Cao fled and was pursued by Ma Chao. Ma Chao shouted that the man dressed in the red robe was Cao Cao, so Cao took off his robe and discarded it to avoid being recognised. When Ma Chao saw that he shouted again that the man with a long beard was Cao Cao, so Cao drew his sword and quickly trimmed his beard until it was very short. Ma Chao then shouted that the man with a short beard was Cao Cao, and Cao responded by wrapping a flag around his jaw. Cao Hong appeared and held off Ma Chao long enough for Cao Cao to escape.

The following day, Ma Chao engaged Cao Cao's general Xu Chu in a duel. Xu Chu removed his upper garments, fighting topless against Ma Chao both on horseback and on foot. Neither of them managed to overcome his opponent.

Cao Cao eventually followed Jia Xu's strategy to turn Ma Chao and his ally Han Sui against each other. Ma Chao fell for the ruse and believed that Han Sui was planning to betray him so he barged into Han Sui's tent and attacked him. Han Sui lost his left arm during the fight and narrowly escaped under the protection of his subordinates. Cao Cao then took advantage of their internal conflict to attack them and defeated Ma Chao. Ma Chao fled to join the warlord Zhang Lu in Hanzhong after his defeat.

=== Historicity ===
Both Ma Chao and Cao Cao's biographies in the Sanguozhi confirmed that Ma Chao started a rebellion in 211 together with Han Sui, Yang Qiu, Li Kan, and Cheng Yi in Guanzhong and they formed a coalition army to attack Cao Cao, leading to the Battle of Tong Pass. The Dianlue stated that around a year after Ma Chao rebelled, Emperor Xian issued an imperial decree to Cao Cao, ordering him to have Ma Chao's entire family executed. This proves that the order of events had been reversed in Sanguo Yanyi, because Ma Chao started a rebellion in the first place, and then his clan was exterminated by Cao Cao about a year later.

The duel between Ma Chao and Xu Chu is not documented in the Sanguozhi and is likely to be fictional. Ma Chao, Cao Cao, and Xu Chu's biographies gave an account of a meeting between Cao Cao, Ma Chao, and Han Sui during the battle. Cao Cao rode forth on horseback to speak with Ma Chao and Han Sui. Cao Cao was accompanied only by Xu Chu. Ma Chao had confidence in himself and secretly harboured the intention of charging forward and capturing Cao Cao when they met. However, he had heard of Xu Chu before and suspected that the man with Cao Cao was Xu Chu. He then asked Cao Cao: "Where is your Tiger Marquis?" Cao Cao pointed at Xu Chu, and Xu glared at Ma Chao. Ma Chao was afraid and did not dare to make his move.

Ma Chao, Cao Cao, and Jia Xu's biographies all mentioned Cao Cao heeding Jia Xu's suggestion to sow discord between Ma Chao and Han Sui and turn them against each other. Cao Cao's biography gave a detailed account of this incident, which is mainly similar to the description in Sanguo Yanyi, except that there is no mention about Ma Chao cutting off Han Sui's arm in a fight. Besides, the generals Cheng Yi, Li Kan, Yang Qiu, and others were not subordinates of Han Sui, but rather, independent members who joined Ma Chao's alliance.

== In popular culture ==
The Battle of Tong Pass is one of the playable stages in Koei's video game series Dynasty Warriors. If the player is on Cao Cao's side and follows the order of events in both history and the novel by making Han Sui defect, it is an easy victory. In the original releases of Dynasty Warriors 6 for the PS3 and the Xbox 360, the stage was removed, but the stage was brought back, along with the Battle of Ruxukou and the Battle of Jieting, in the later release for the PS2.
