= Tungkuan =

Tungkuan may refer to one of the following locations in China:

- The old name of Dongguan, Guangdong
- Tongguan County, Shaanxi, famous for its historical pass
- Tungkuan, Taiwan
