= Yang Qiu =

Yang Qiu may refer to:

- Yang Qiu (Fangzheng) (陽球), style name Fangzheng (方正), Eastern Han dynasty official, see Book of the Later Han
- Yang Qiu (warlord) (楊秋), Eastern Han dynasty warlord who sided with Ma Chao in the Battle of Tong Pass (211)
