= Chenggong Ying =

3rd-century Chinese official serving under warlord Han Sui

- 成公英

Army Adviser (參軍)
- In office c. 220–?
- Monarch: Cao Pi

Military Adviser (軍師)
- In office c. 210s–?
- Monarch: Emperor Xian of Han
- Chancellor: Cao Cao

Personal details
- Born: Unknown Yuzhong County, Gansu
- Died: Unknown
- Occupation: Official

Chenggong Ying (fl. 180s–220s) was an official serving under the warlord Han Sui during the late Eastern Han dynasty of China. After Han Sui's death, Chenggong Ying served under the warlord Cao Cao and later in the state of Cao Wei during the Three Kingdoms period.

== Life ==
Chenggong Ying was from Jincheng Commandery (金城郡), which is around present-day Yuzhong County, Gansu. He became a subordinate and trusted aide of the warlord Han Sui sometime during the reign of Emperor Ling (r. 168–189) in the Eastern Han dynasty.

In 211, Han Sui joined Ma Chao and a coalition of warlords in the Guanzhong region to attack Cao Cao, the warlord who controlled the Han central government and the figurehead Emperor Xian. Both sides clashed at the Battle of Tong Pass, which resulted in a victory for Cao Cao. As Han Sui fled after the defeat, many of his men abandoned him but Chenggong Ying remained loyal and stayed with him. After Yan Xing, Han Sui's son-in-law, attempted to murder him, Han Sui felt so disillusioned that he wanted to retreat to Yi Province (covering present-day Sichuan and Chongqing) and take shelter under the warlord Liu Bei, a rival of Cao Cao. However, Chenggong Ying strongly objected as he felt that Han Sui should not simply abandon the power base he had built up over the years and become a vassal of another warlord. He urged Han Sui to take shelter under the Qiang tribes and wait for an opportunity to rise up again.

After Han Sui's death in 215, Chenggong Ying pledged allegiance to Cao Cao, who appointed him as a Military Adviser (軍師) and awarded him the title of a marquis. One day, when Chenggong Ying accompanied Cao Cao on a hunting excursion, he fired three consecutive arrows and shot down three deer. Cao Cao then asked him, "You were able to fulfil your loyalty towards Han Sui, so can you do the same with me?" Chenggong Ying knelt down and replied, "In all honesty, if Han Sui were still alive today, I wouldn't be here with you." He then shed tears. Cao Cao admired him for his loyalty towards his previous lord and treated him respectfully.

Chenggong Ying continued serving in the state of Cao Wei, established by Cao Cao's successor Cao Pi, during the Three Kingdoms period after the end of the Eastern Han dynasty. During this time, he served as an Army Adviser (參軍) under Zhang Ji, the Inspector of Liang Province, and accompanied him on a campaign against the Lushuihu people in Liang Province. He died of illness in an unknown year.

== See also ==
- Lists of people of the Three Kingdoms

== General references ==
- Chen Shou (1977) [429]. Pei Songzhi (ed.). Annotated Records of the Three Kingdoms 三國志注. Taipei: Dingwen Printing.
