= Tong Pass =

Historical mountain pass in northwest China

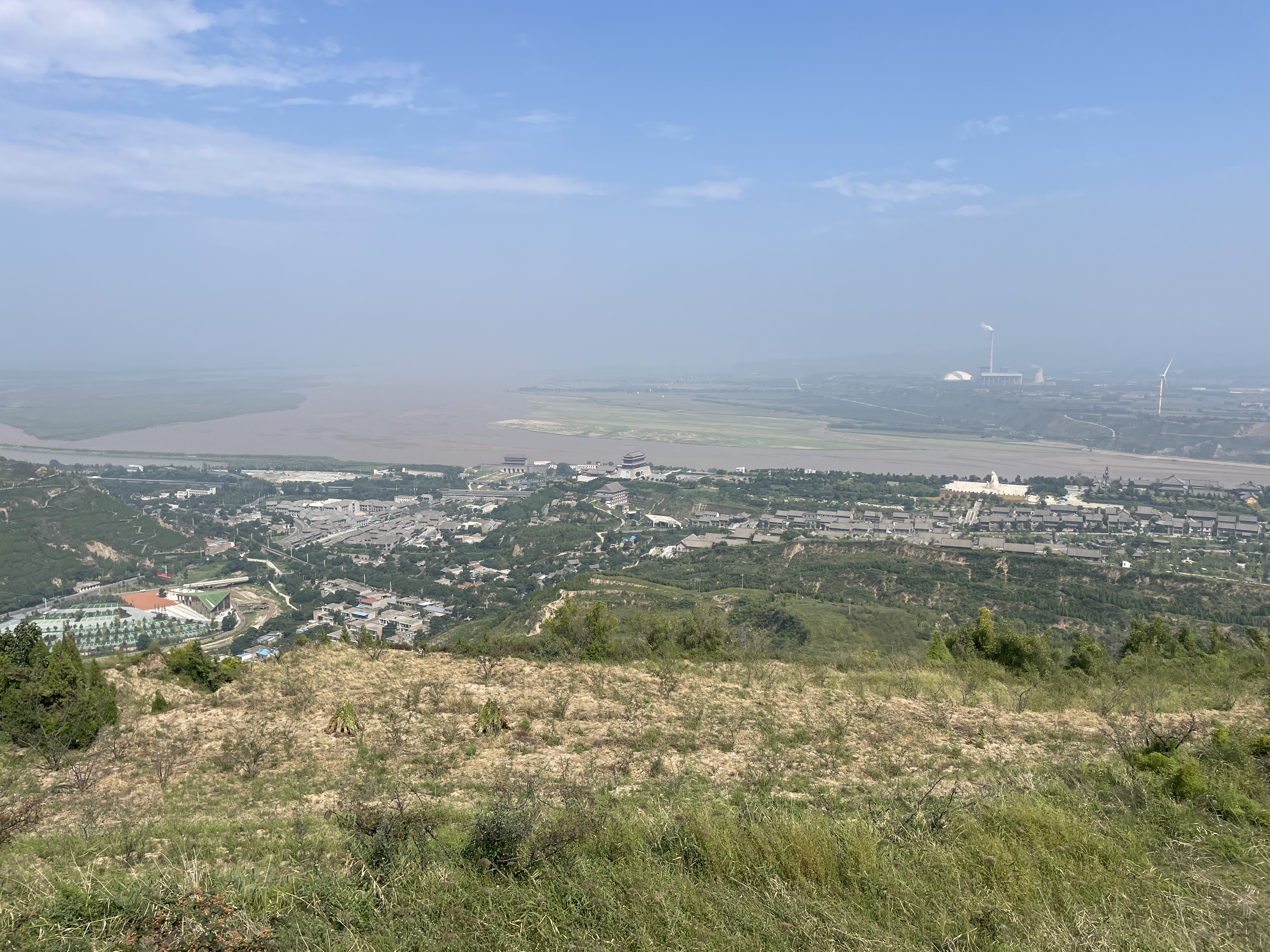
- Remote view of the Tong Pass (Ming)

- Location within Northern China Location within China
- Traversed by: Longhai railway, G30

Location
- Location: Tongguan County, Shaanxi, China
- Range: Gap between Qinling and Taihang Mountains
- Coordinates: 34.606°N 110.286°E

Tongguan
- Traditional Chinese: 潼關
- Simplified Chinese: 潼关
- Literal meaning: High Pass
Transcriptions
Standard Mandarin
- Hanyu Pinyin: Tóngguān
- Wade–Giles: Tʻung^{2}-kuan^{1}

Tongguan, or Tong Pass, was a former mountain pass and fortress located south of the confluence of the Wei and Yellow Rivers, in today's Tongguan County, Weinan, Shaanxi, China. It was an important chokepoint, protecting Xi'an and the surrounding Guanzhong region from the North China Plain. Tong Pass was built in 196 AD by the warlord Cao Cao during the late Eastern Han dynasty. The fortress was the seat of Tongguan County, but was demolished in the 1950s to make way for the Sanmenxia Dam and reservoir.

== History ==
Chinese civilization first grew up along the Wei, Luo, and Yellow River valleys of the Loess Plateau before expanding out into the "barbarian" regions. The state of Qin fortified the Hangu Pass to the east of Tongguan as its eastern border and it continued to protect the Chinese heartland from outside attack during the Qin and Han dynasties. During the Eastern Han that succeeded Wang Mang's short-lived "Xin dynasty", the guards at Hangu reversed themselves and protected Luoyang, capital of Easter Han, in the plains from attacks coming from the west. From the time of the AD 211 Battle of Tongguan, however, Tongguan replaced the Hangu Pass as the principal strategic post between the Guanzhong area and the North China Plain. Under the Tang, the fall of Tongguan to An Lushan's rebels led directly to their capture of the capital Chang'an (now Xi'an, Shaanxi).

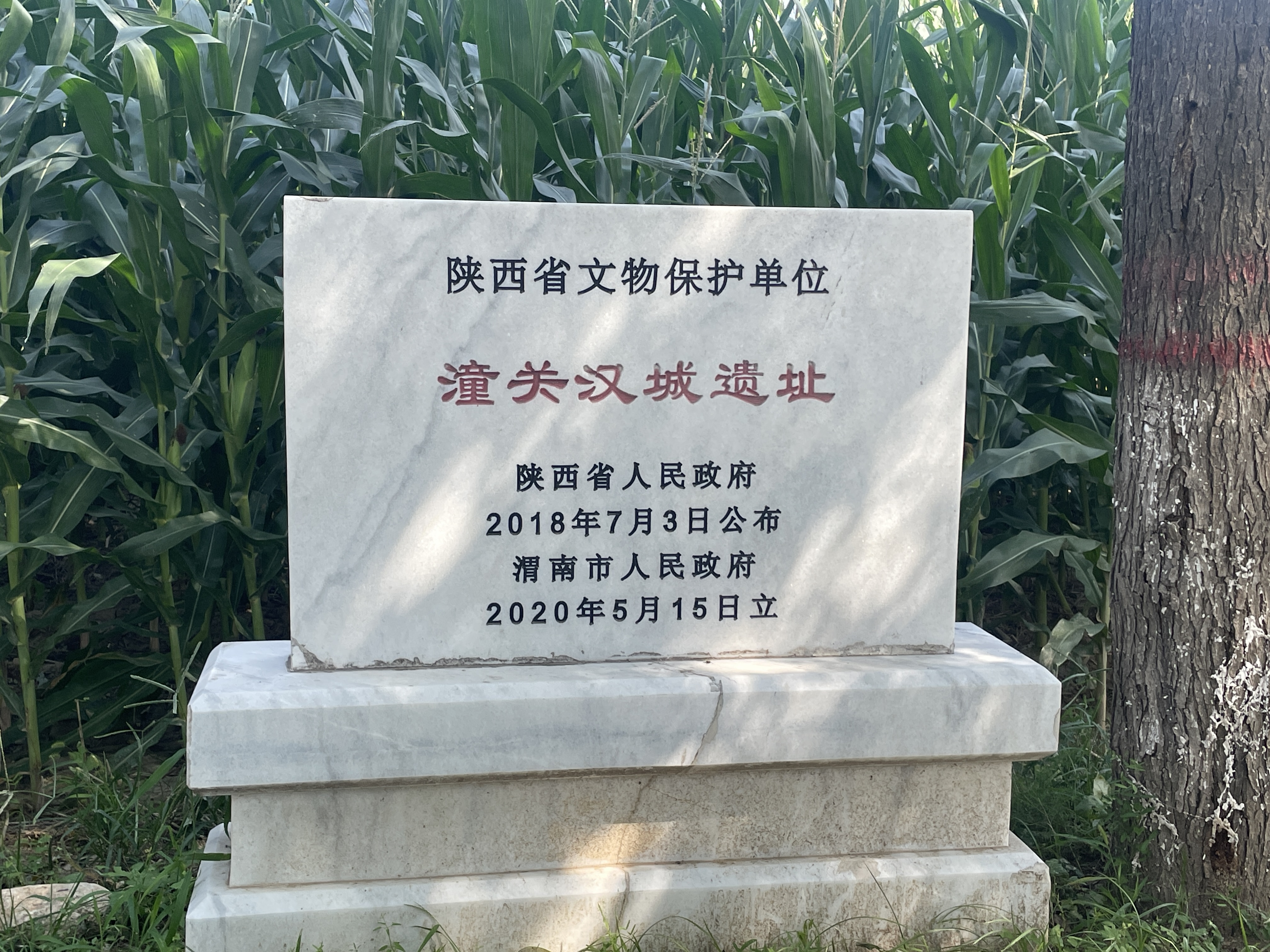
Site of ruins of Tong Pass (Han)

Old photo

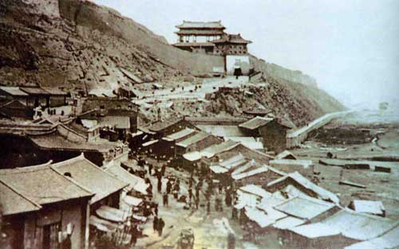
The Tong Pass in 1941

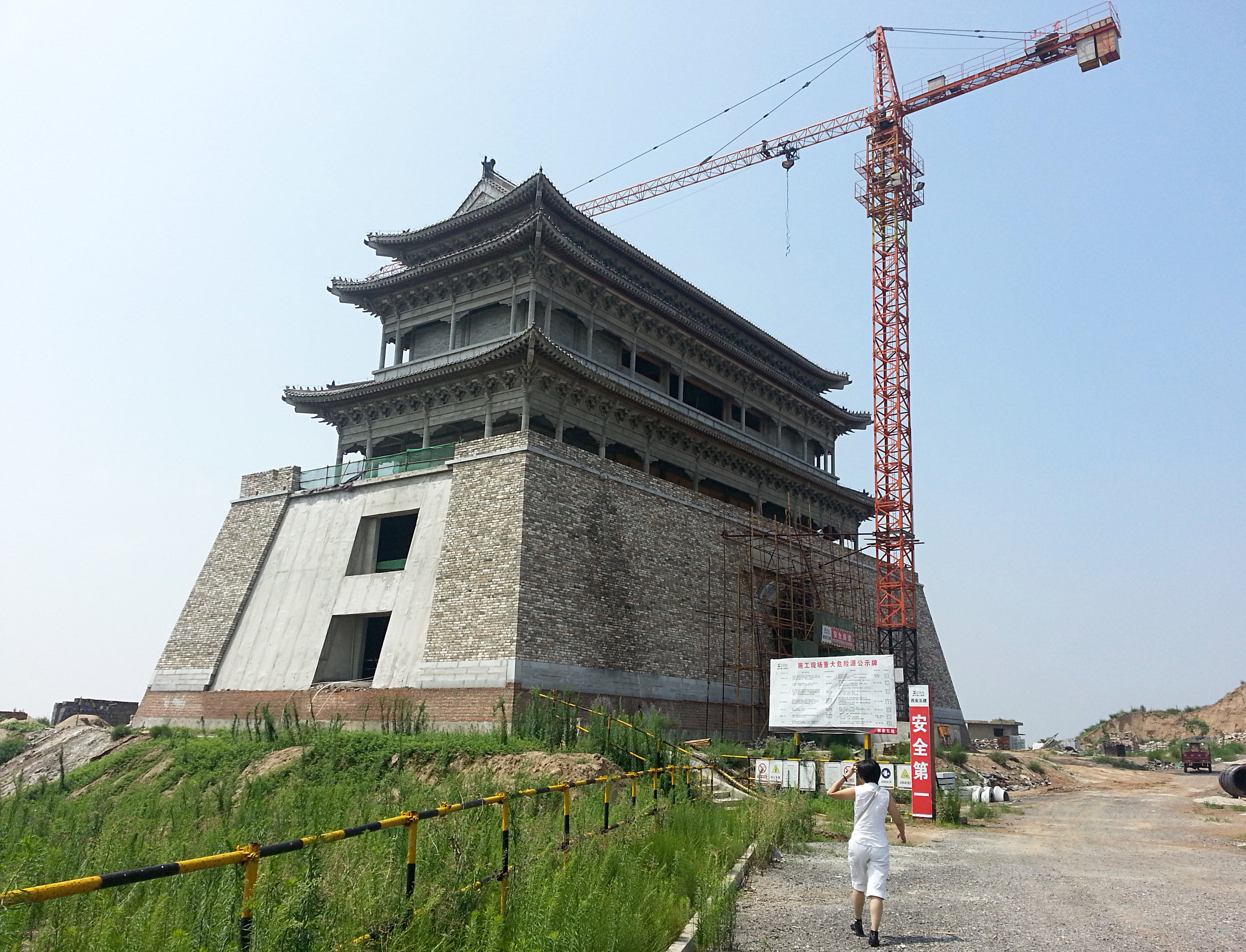
Modern recreation of the fortress' western gate
