= Lou Gui =

Chinese official and adviser serving Cao Cao

Lou Gui 婁圭
- Born: Unknown; Nanyang, Henan
- Died: Unknown
- Other names: Zibo (子伯)
- Occupation(s): Official, adviser

Lou Gui (fl. 190s–211), courtesy name Zibo, was an official and adviser serving under the warlord Cao Cao during the late Eastern Han dynasty of China.

== Life ==
Lou Gui was from Nanyang Commandery (南陽郡), which is around present-day Nanyang, Henan. In his younger days, he was arrested and sentenced to death for providing shelter to fugitives, but he managed to break out of prison, disguise himself to fool the guards and successfully escape. In the early 190s, he gathered a group of followers and brought them along to join Liu Biao, the Governor of Jing Province. During his brief stay in Jing Province, he helped Liu Biao recruit many members of the scholar-gentry who had fled south to Jing Province to evade the chaos in central and northern China. Around the time, he encountered Wang Zhong, who had fled to Jing Province to avoid a famine in the Guanzhong region. When Lou Gui tried to recruit Wang Zhong to join Liu Biao, Wang Zhong attacked him, induced his followers to defect to his side, and brought them along to join the warlord Cao Cao.

Lou Gui later left Liu Biao and joined Cao Cao as well. Cao Cao treated him respectfully and commissioned him as an army general. However, Lou Gui never held command of any troops and instead served as a military adviser. In 208, when Cao Cao led his forces to attack Jing Province, the provincial governor Liu Cong (Liu Biao's son) surrendered and offered his fu (a tally symbolising authority) to Cao Cao. When Cao Cao's other advisers suspected that Liu Cong was pretending to surrender, Lou Gui argued that Liu Cong was sincere since he had given up his fu, and managed to convince Cao Cao to accept Liu Cong's surrender.

In 211, during the Battle of Tong Pass, Lou Gui advised Cao Cao to order his troops to mix water and sand and use the mixture to build defensive walls and structures. As the weather was freezing, the water-and-sand mixture froze overnight and became an instantly-built fortress for Cao Cao's forces.

Over the years, Lou Gui and his family managed to amass a huge fortune. Cao Cao once remarked, "Lou Zibo may be wealthier than me, but he doesn't have as much power as me." One day, while he was with Xi Shou (習授), Lou Gui saw Cao Cao and his son(s) out on a trip. Xi Shou remarked, "Both father and son(s) look really happy." Lou Gui remarked, "When you live in this world, you should strive to be self-reliant. Why should you keep looking at other people?" Xi Shou later secretly reported to Cao Cao what Lou Gui said. Cao Cao, thinking that Lou Gui was showing disrespect towards him, then ordered him to be executed.

== In Romance of the Three Kingdoms ==
Lou Gui appears as a minor character in the 14th-century historical novel Romance of the Three Kingdoms. In the novel, he is a hermit from Jingzhao Commandery (京兆郡; around present-day Xi'an, Shaanxi) living in the Zhongnan Mountains. His nickname was "Mengmei Householder" (夢梅居士). He appears during the Battle of Tong Pass to assist Cao Cao. After Cao Cao wins the battle, he wants to thank Lou Gui by rewarding him, but Lou Gui declines and leaves.

== See also ==
- Lists of people of the Three Kingdoms
