= Yang Qiu (warlord) =

3rd-century Chinese warlord

- 楊秋

General Who Attacks Bandits (討寇將軍)
- In office c. 220s–?
- Monarch: Cao Pi

Personal details
- Born: Unknown
- Died: Unknown
- Occupation: General
- Peerage: Marquis of Linjing (臨涇侯)

Yang Qiu (fl. 211–220) was a warlord from northwestern China who lived during the late Eastern Han dynasty.

== Life ==
Around 211, Yang Qiu joined a coalition of warlords in the Guanzhong region, led by Ma Chao and Han Sui, and rebelled against the Han central government, which was under the control of the warlord Cao Cao. Cao Cao's forces defeated the coalition at the Battle of Tong Pass, after which Yang Qiu fled to Anding Commandery (安定郡; around present-day Pingliang, Gansu). In the winter of 211, Cao Cao led an army from Chang'an to attack and besiege Yang Qiu in Anding Commandery. Yang Qiu surrendered. He was restored of his former titles awarded by the Han imperial court and allowed to remain in his former territory in northwestern China and pacify the people there.

Yang Qiu served in the state of Cao Wei during the Three Kingdoms period after the fall of the Han dynasty in 220. In Cao Pi's reign, he was appointed as General Who Attacks Bandits (討寇將軍) and gradually rose through the ranks until he was enfeoffed as the Marquis of Linjing (臨涇侯). He died of natural causes.

== See also ==
- Lists of people of the Three Kingdoms
