= Wang Zhong (Three Kingdoms) =

Chinese Cao Wei state general (died 242)

- 王忠

General of Light Chariots (輕車將軍)
- In office 220 – 242
- Monarch: Cao Pi / Cao Rui / Cao Fang

General Who Spreads Martial Might (揚武將軍)
- In office ? – 220
- Monarch: Emperor Xian of Han
- Chancellor: Cao Cao

General of the Household (中郎將)
- In office ?–?
- Monarch: Emperor Xian of Han

Personal details
- Born: Unknown Xingping, Shaanxi
- Died: 3 October 242
- Occupation: General
- Peerage: Marquis of a Chief Village (都亭侯)

Chinese name
- Chinese: 王忠
- Hanyu Pinyin: Wáng Zhōng
- Wade–Giles: Wang^{2} Chung^{1}

Wang Zhong (died 242) was a military general of the state of Cao Wei during the Three Kingdoms period of China. He previously served under the warlord Cao Cao in the late Eastern Han dynasty.

== Life ==
Wang Zhong was from Fufeng Commandery (扶風郡), which is around present-day Xingping, Shaanxi. He served as a Canton Chief (亭長) in his early career. When a famine broke out in the Guanzhong region, Wang Zhong fled south to Jing Province, where he encountered Lou Gui, who tried to persuade him to join Liu Biao, the Governor of Jing Province. Wang Zhong refused, attacked Lou Gui and induced his followers to defect to his side, and brought them along to join Cao Cao, the warlord who controlled the Han central government and the figurehead Emperor Xian.

Cao Cao appointed Wang Zhong as a General of the Household (中郎將). Around 200 CE, Cao Cao ordered him and Liu Dai (劉岱) (Note: This Liu Dai was not the same person as Liu Dai, brother of Liu Yao, who died in 192.) to lead troops to attack Liu Bei in Xu Province but they were defeated and driven back. Wang Zhong was later promoted to General Who Spreads Martial Might (揚武將軍) and awarded the title of a Marquis of a Chief Village (都亭侯). In 213, Wang Zhong, along with Xiahou Dun, Liu Xun, Liu Ruo (劉若) and others, urged Emperor Xian to enfeoff Cao Cao as the Duke of Wei (魏公). Cao Cao's son and heir apparent, Cao Pi, heard that Wang Zhong had resorted to cannibalism before during the famine in the Guanzhong region, so he played a prank on Wang Zhong by attaching a skeleton to the saddle of Wang Zhong's horse.

In 220, following Cao Cao's death, Cao Pi inherited his father's vassal king title, "King of Wei" (魏王), and remained a nominal subject of Emperor Xian. He then appointed Wang Zhong as General of Light Chariots (輕車將軍). Later that year, Wang Zhong, along with Cao Ren, Liu Ruo (劉若), Xianyu Fu (鮮于輔) and others, urged Cao Pi to usurp the throne from Emperor Xian and declare himself emperor. Cao Pi did so, ended the Eastern Han dynasty and established the state of Cao Wei to replace it. This event marked the beginning of the Three Kingdoms period in China.

Wang Zhong continued serving in the Cao Wei state. In 224, when the general Cao Zhen returned from a campaign, Cao Pi ordered Wu Zhi to host a banquet in his residence in Cao Zhen's honour. During the banquet, Wu Zhi instructed actors to put up a skit to make fun of Cao Zhen and Zhu Shuo (朱鑠), who were fat and thin respectively. Cao Zhen was enraged and he shouted at Wu Zhi, "Are you and your men seeking a fight with me and my men?" Cao Hong and Wang Zhong egged Wu Zhi on by saying, "If you want to make the General (Cao Zhen) admit that he is fat, you have to show that you're thin." Cao Zhen drew his sword, glared at them and said, "I'll kill whoever dares to mock me."

In 242, Wang Zhong died.

== In Romance of the Three Kingdoms ==
Wang Zhong appears as a minor character in the 14th-century historical novel Romance of the Three Kingdoms. His only appearance in the novel is when Cao Cao orders him and Liu Dai to lead troops to attack Liu Bei in Xu Province. Liu Bei's general Guan Yu defeats and captures Wang Zhong, but releases him later. When Wang Zhong returns to Cao Cao after his failure, Cao Cao wants to execute him, but spares him after Kong Rong pleads for leniency.

== See also ==
- Lists of people of the Three Kingdoms
