= Tongguan County =

Coordinates: 34°29′11″N 110°15′49″E

Tongguan County 潼关县 Tungkwan, T'ung-kuan
- County
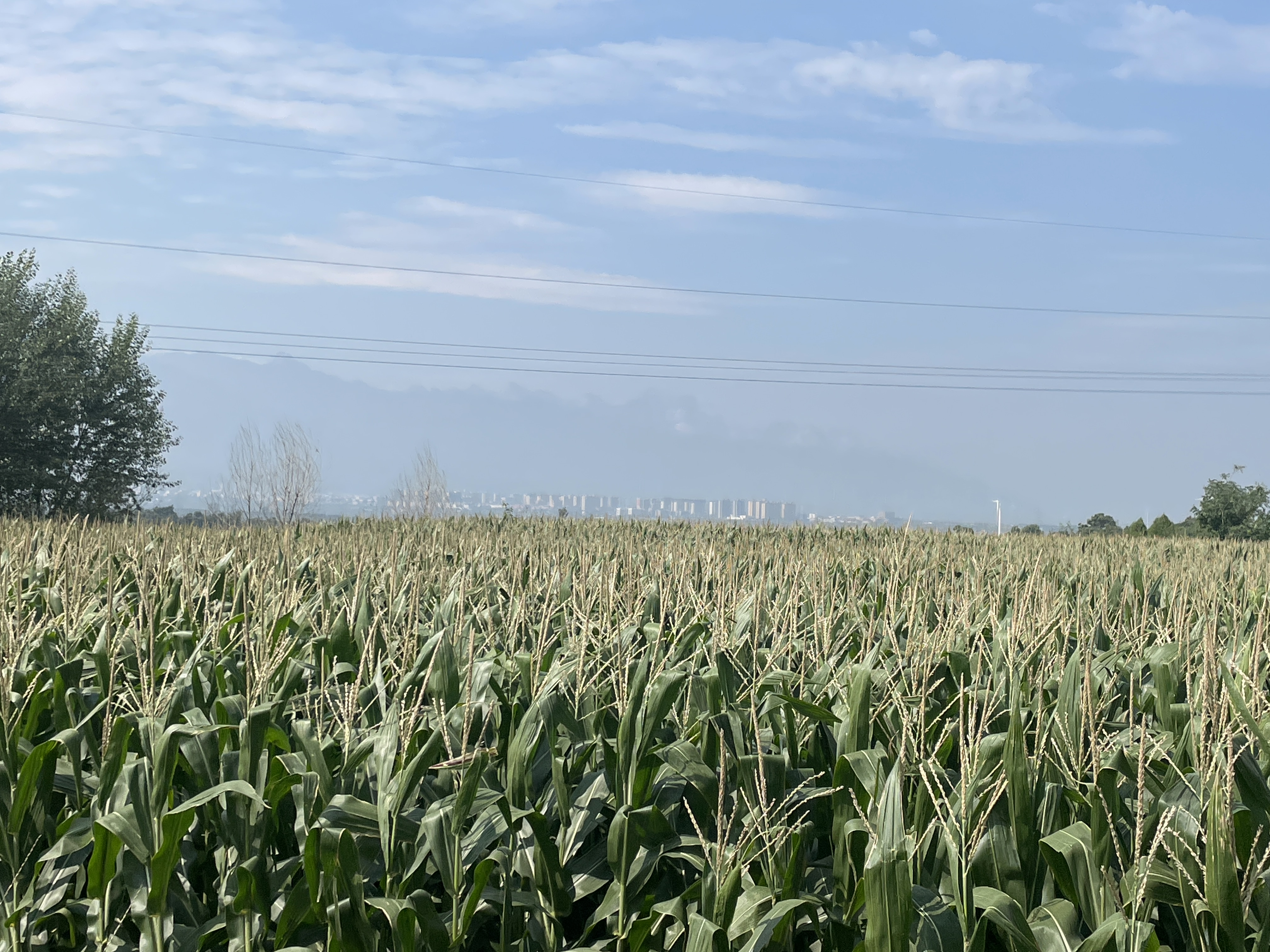
- Tongguan

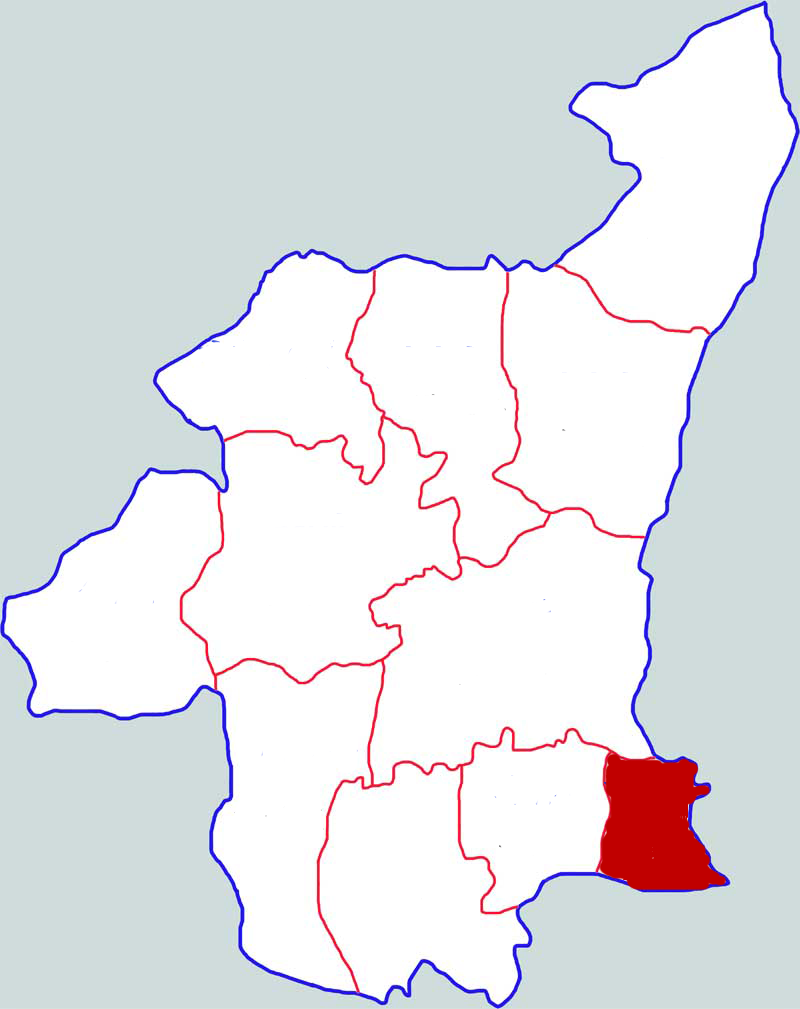
- Tongguan in Weinan

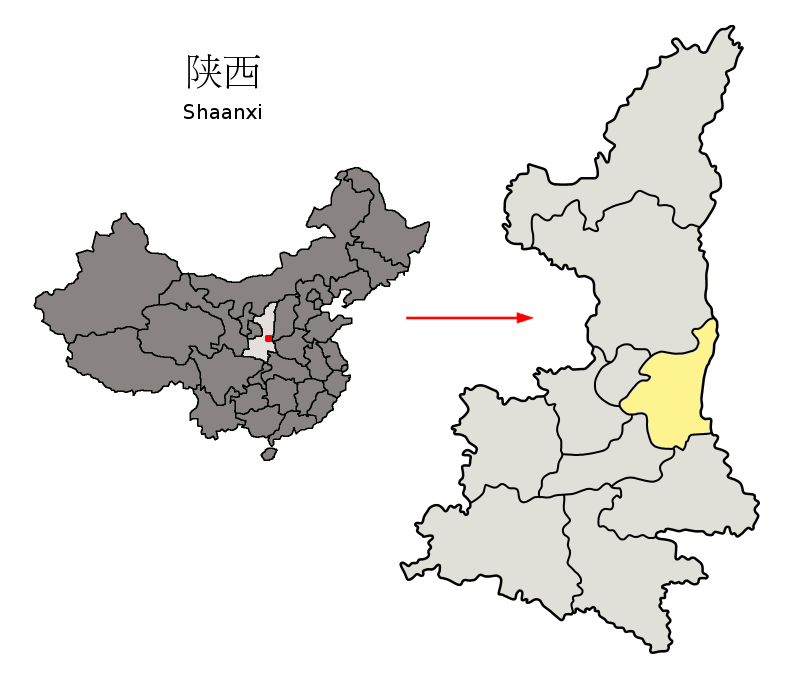
- Weinan in Shaanxi
- Country: People's Republic of China
- Province: Shaanxi
- Prefecture-level city: Weinan

Area
  - Total: 526 km^{2} (203 sq mi)

Population (2018)
  - Total: 154,200
  - Density: 293/km^{2} (759/sq mi)
- Time zone: UTC+8 (China Standard)
- Postal Code: 714300
- Website: http://www.tongguan.gov.cn/

Tongguan
- Traditional Chinese: 潼關
- Simplified Chinese: 潼关
- Postal: Tungkwan
- Literal meaning: High Pass
Transcriptions
Standard Mandarin
- Hanyu Pinyin: Tóngguān
- Wade–Giles: Tʻung^{2}-kuan^{1}

Tongguan County (alternately romanized as Tungkwan (Note: Tongguan has also been romanized as Tung-kwan.)) is a county in the east of Shaanxi province, China, administered as part of the prefecture-level city of Weinan. It is named after the Tong Pass, a historical fortress located south of the confluence of the Wei and Yellow Rivers. It is the southeastern corner of the Ordos Loop, the point at which the Qin Mountains turn the Yellow River sharply eastward, forcing it into the North China Plain, and borders the provinces of Shanxi to the north and Henan to the east.

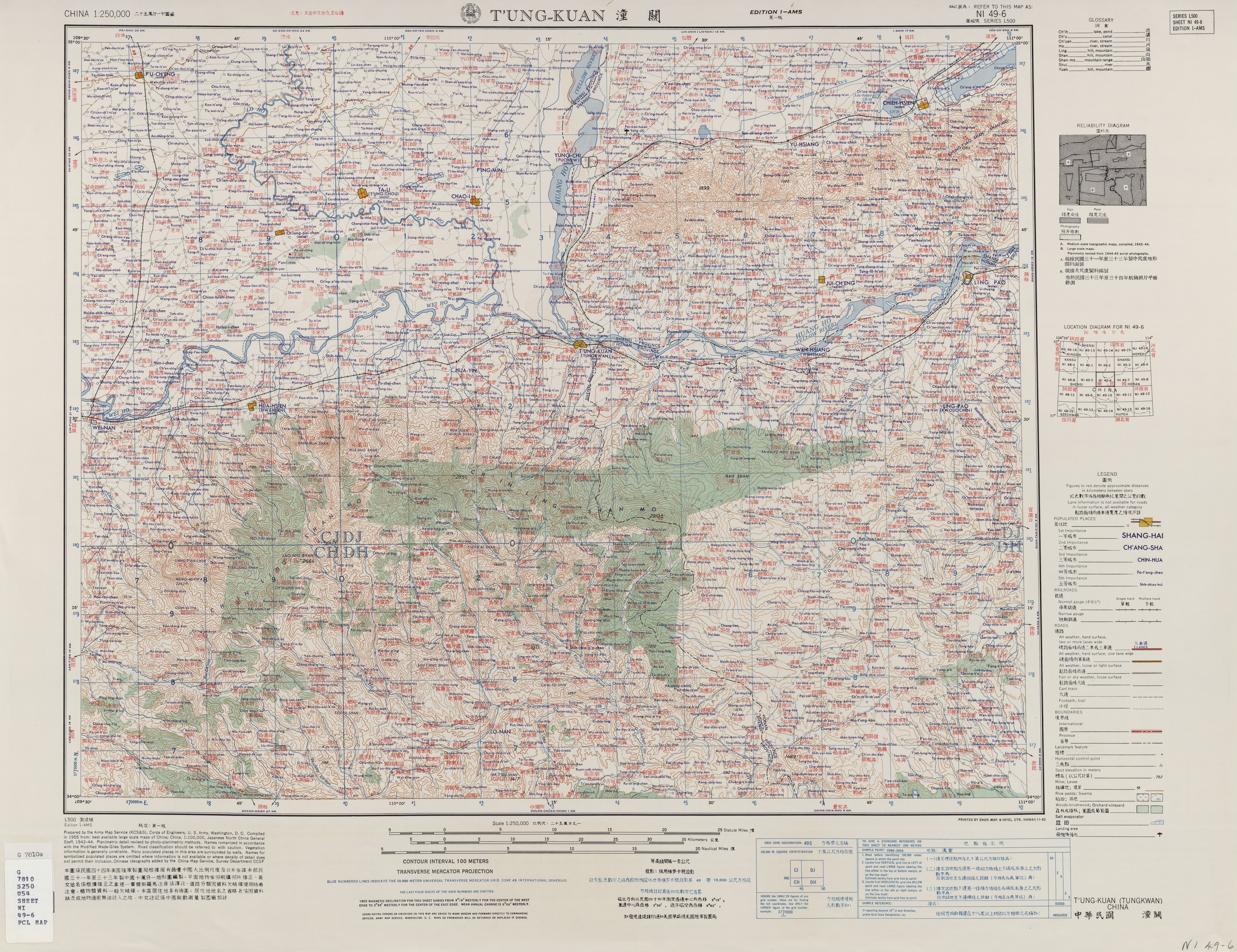
Map including Tongguan (labeled as 潼關 T'UNG-KUAN (TUNGKWAN) (walled)) (AMS, 1955)

== Administrative divisions ==
Tongguan County is divided to 5 towns and 1 townships.

Towns

- Chengguan (城关镇)
- Qingdong (秦东镇)
- Taiyao (太要镇)
- Tongyu (桐峪镇)
- Daiziying (代字营镇)

Townships

- Anle (安乐乡)

== Economy ==
Tongguan County is rich in gold. Located in the Qinling Mountain region, it is estimated to have more than 110 metric tons of gold deposits. Mining and related activities account for over 70% of the local economy.

Since the early 2000s, financial institutions in Tongguan, including rural credit cooperatives, began offering gold-backed loans, leveraging the county's gold reserves. By 2016, more than 83% of the 1.5 billion yuan in loans issued by the Tongguan Rural Credit Cooperative were secured with gold collateral, contributing significantly to local lending income.

Tongguan was also the center of one of the largest gold collateral fraud cases in China, involving up to 46 tons of adulterated gold and affecting more than 19 local lenders. The incident had a lasting impact on regional financial stability and led to regulatory reforms and criminal prosecutions.

== Climate ==
Climate data for Tongguan, elevation 542 m (1,778 ft), (1991–2020 normals, extremes 1981–2010)
Month	Jan	Feb	Mar	Apr	May	Jun	Jul	Aug	Sep	Oct	Nov	Dec	Year
Record high °C (°F)	14.3 (57.7)	21.1 (70.0)	28.6 (83.5)	35.8 (96.4)	38.0 (100.4)	40.2 (104.4)	38.9 (102.0)	38.5 (101.3)	38.5 (101.3)	31.0 (87.8)	23.2 (73.8)	18.8 (65.8)	40.2 (104.4)
Mean daily maximum °C (°F)	4.1 (39.4)	8.6 (47.5)	15.0 (59.0)	21.7 (71.1)	26.7 (80.1)	30.9 (87.6)	31.7 (89.1)	29.9 (85.8)	25.0 (77.0)	19.0 (66.2)	11.9 (53.4)	5.6 (42.1)	19.2 (66.5)
Daily mean °C (°F)	−0.2 (31.6)	3.6 (38.5)	9.5 (49.1)	15.9 (60.6)	20.9 (69.6)	25.3 (77.5)	26.7 (80.1)	25.0 (77.0)	20.3 (68.5)	14.4 (57.9)	7.4 (45.3)	1.4 (34.5)	14.2 (57.5)
Mean daily minimum °C (°F)	−3.3 (26.1)	0.1 (32.2)	5.3 (41.5)	11.1 (52.0)	15.9 (60.6)	20.4 (68.7)	22.5 (72.5)	21.2 (70.2)	16.6 (61.9)	10.8 (51.4)	4.0 (39.2)	−1.7 (28.9)	10.2 (50.4)
Record low °C (°F)	−13.1 (8.4)	−9.3 (15.3)	−5.3 (22.5)	−0.2 (31.6)	5.2 (41.4)	12.0 (53.6)	16.5 (61.7)	13.2 (55.8)	7.0 (44.6)	0.5 (32.9)	−8.7 (16.3)	−14.0 (6.8)	−14.0 (6.8)
Average precipitation mm (inches)	7.6 (0.30)	10.4 (0.41)	19.8 (0.78)	39.2 (1.54)	64.5 (2.54)	65.7 (2.59)	114.2 (4.50)	95.4 (3.76)	92.7 (3.65)	54.2 (2.13)	24.3 (0.96)	5.3 (0.21)	593.3 (23.37)
Average precipitation days (≥ 0.1 mm)	4.2	4.1	5.3	7.3	8.8	8.1	10.7	10.4	10.6	8.6	6.0	3.2	87.3
Average snowy days	5.0	3.8	1.6	0.2	0	0	0	0	0	0	1.9	3.2	15.7
Average relative humidity (%)	56	56	53	54	54	56	68	72	71	68	65	58	61
Mean monthly sunshine hours	146.5	148.8	187.2	211.9	221.0	222.6	226.4	208.3	164.3	154.0	143.5	153.6	2,188.1
Percentage possible sunshine	47	48	50	54	51	51	52	51	45	44	47	51	49
Source: China Meteorological Administration
