= Han Sui =

Han dynasty general and warlord (died 215)

- 韓遂
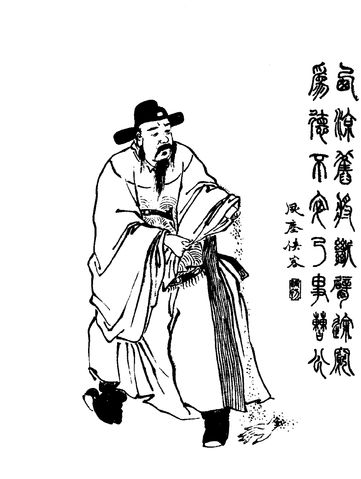
- A Qing dynasty illustration of Han Sui from Romance of the Three Kingdoms (Note: The fictional loss of his arm was from the Romance.)

General Who Attacks the West (征西將軍)
- In office 201–211
- Monarch: Emperor Xian of Han

General Who Pacifies the Qiang (安羌將軍)
- In office 195–201
- Monarch: Emperor Xian of Han

General Who Guards the West (鎮西將軍)
- In office 192–195
- Monarch: Emperor Xian of Han

Personal details
- Born: 140s
- Died: 215
- Occupation: General, warlord
- Courtesy name: Wényuē (文約)
- Other name: Han Yue (韓約)

Han Sui (140s (Note: The Dianlüe recorded that Han Sui was in his 70s when he died. Thus by calculation, his birth year should be in the 140s.) - June or July 215 (Note: According to Cao Cao's biography in Sanguozhi, Han Sui was killed in the 5th month of the 20th year of the Jian'an era of Liu Xie's reign. This corresponds to 15 June to 13 July 215 on the Julian calendar.)), courtesy name Wenyue, originally named Han Yue, (Note: The Xiandi Chunqiu recorded that Han changed his name along with Bian after the Han authorities offered a fiefdom of 1000 households for their capture during the Liang Province rebellion.) was a military general and minor warlord who lived during the late Eastern Han dynasty of China. For most of his life, he was active in Liang Province (涼州; covering parts of present-day Shaanxi and Gansu) and was involved in several rebellions against the Han government and the warlord Cao Cao.

== Life and background ==
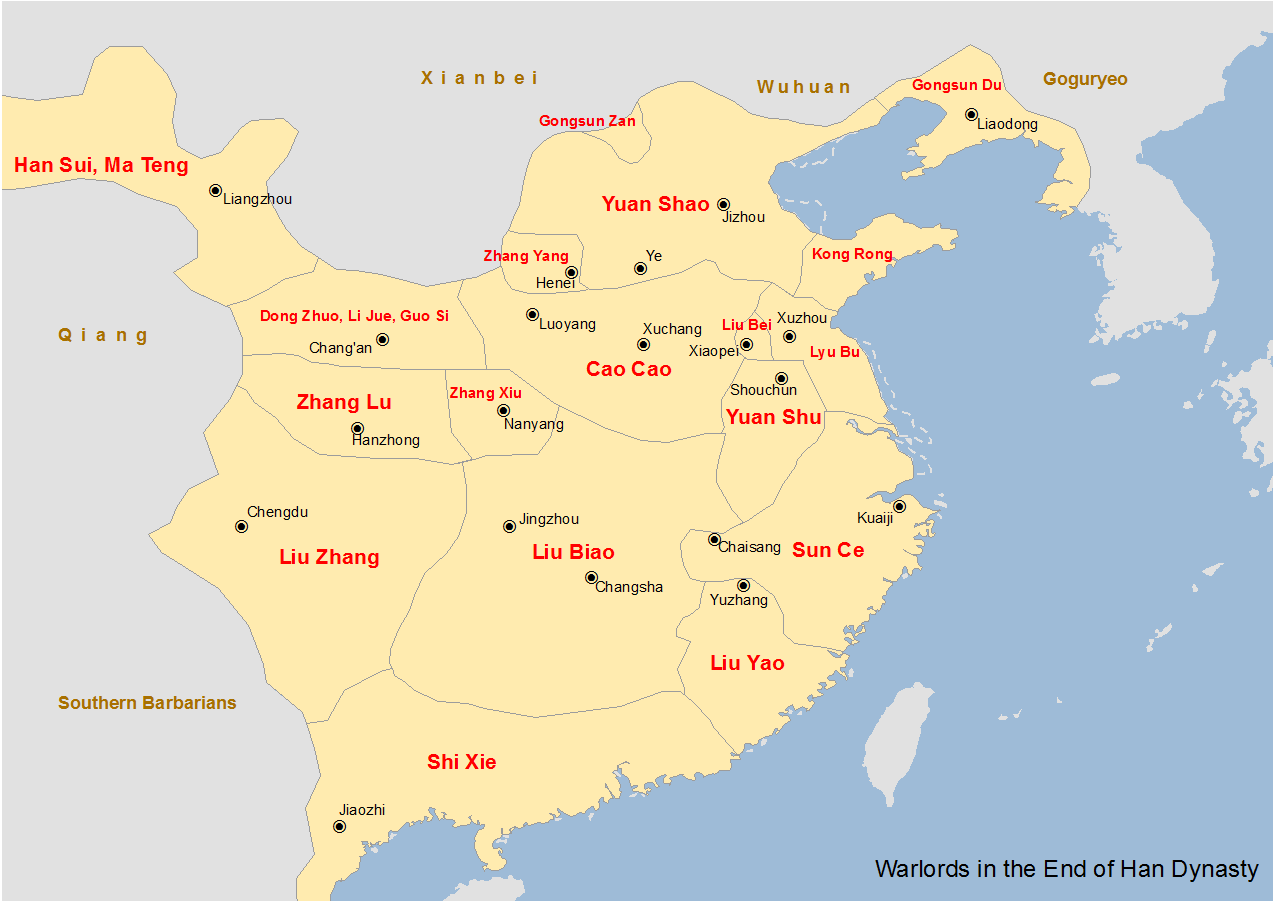
Map showing the major warlords of the Han dynasty in the 190s, including Han Sui

Han Sui's unnamed father was nominated as a xiaolian in c.174, the same year as Cao Cao.

Han Sui once served under Yin Hua (殷华), Administrator of Jincheng; after Yin died on 7 October 178, Han Sui and other officials who had served under Yin eventually erected a plaque for him.

With the backing of the Qiang people who populated much of Liang Province, Han Sui, who was then a minor official, (Note: The Xiandi Chunqiu recorded that he was a congshi (从事) just before he joined the rebellion, while the Dianlüe recorded that he and Bian Zhang enjoyed renown in the western provinces.) participated in the Liang Province rebellion against the Han dynasty in the name of killing eunuchs during the rule of Emperor Ling. (Note: According to the Dianlüe, before the Liang Province rebellion, Han Sui once went to the capital Luoyang, where he advised He Jin to eliminate the eunuch faction. After He refused, Han returned to Liang province.) He joined forces with others in the area, such as Bian Zhang, Beigong Boyu (北宮伯玉) and Li Wenhou (李文侯). Despite suffering a defeat by government forces under Dong Zhuo, Han Sui maintained the support of the Qiang people and maintained his territory in Liang Province. Han Sui is thought to have preferred to remain somewhat behind the scenes, placing someone else in the position of leadership while holding real power himself. When Bian Zhang and the other leaders passed from the scene, he placed Wang Guo (王國) in power with the help of his ally Ma Teng, whom he pledged a pact of brotherhood with. The arrangement did not last long, however, and Wang Guo was removed from power after being defeated by the Han general Huangfu Song. It was at this point that Han Sui and Ma Teng declared themselves co-rulers of Liang Province, now mostly autonomous due to turmoil in the Han dynasty.

Early in 192, the two of them submitted to the Han central government, then under Dong Zhuo's control, but Dong Zhuo was assassinated by Lü Bu and Wang Yun in May. After Li Jue, Guo Si and other former followers of Dong Zhuo seized control of the Han central government later that year, Han Sui and Ma Teng allied themselves with Liu Yan and led their armies to attack the Han imperial capital, Chang'an. After suffering a major defeat 13 miles west of Chang'an, and running short on supplies, the warlords retreated back to Liang Province.

Not long afterwards, however, Han Sui and Ma Teng's relationship soured and the two of them battled each other for control of Liang Province. Their battle escalated to the point where both were killing each other's wives and children. Cao Cao, having achieved victory at the Battle of Guandu in 200CE, sent Zhong Yao to broker a peace between the two sides and to place Liang Province under Cao Cao's authority. After the terms were agreed to, Han Sui and Ma Teng would give assistance to Cao Cao in the remainder of his battles against Yuan Shao. After this, Ma Teng was forcibly summoned to Ye and Han Sui placed Ma Teng's son Ma Chao in charge of Liang Province.

When Cao Cao began gathering armies with the intent of invading Hanzhong Commandery, then under the rule of Zhang Lu, Han Sui and Ma Chao suspected that it was they, and not Zhang Lu who would be attacked. The two of them gathered warlords from the western regions and went to war against Cao Cao. In the course of the conflict, however, Cao Cao managed to turn Ma Chao and Han Sui against each other. Han Sui realised that there was no hope for victory with the forces divided against each other in suspicion, and retreated once again to Liang Province. Cao Cao captured and killed Han Sui's children and grandchildren.

When Xiahou Yuan began his subjugation of Liang Province, Han Sui fought against Xiahou, but was ultimately defeated and forced to retreat. He discussed the idea of retreating to Yi Province (covering present-day Sichuan and Chongqing), but his subordinate Chenggong Ying encouraged him to continue his fight against Cao Cao instead. At this point, he was either murdered by some of his own followers or died of illness. In either case, his head was brought to Cao Cao by Han Sui's subordinates as they all surrendered. He was believed to have been over 70 years old at the time of his death.

== In Romance of the Three Kingdoms ==
In the 14th-century historical novel Romance of the Three Kingdoms, Han Sui is depicted as Ma Teng's sworn brother and subordinate, when historically he was actually a warlord of equal footing as Ma Teng. Han Sui's preference to remain out of the scenes may have been a reason for this depiction.

In the novel, during Ma Chao's battles against Cao Cao's forces, Han Sui has eight elite officers serving under him. After Cao Cao successfully used a scheme to turn Ma Chao and Han Sui against each other, Ma Chao grew suspicious of Han Sui and attacked him, cutting off his left arm in the process. Han Sui managed to escape and defect to Cao Cao, who accepted his surrender and allowed him to continue serving as a general in Liang Province alongside Xiahou Yuan.

== See also ==
- Lists of people of the Three Kingdoms
