= Bu Zhi =

Eastern Wu official and general (died 247)

- 步騭

Imperial Chancellor of Eastern Wu
- In office September or October 246 – June or July 247
- Monarch: Sun Quan
- Preceded by: Lu Xun
- Succeeded by: Zhu Ju

Area Commander of Xiling (西陵督)
- In office 229 – September or October 246
- Monarch: Sun Quan

General of Agile Cavalry (驃騎將軍)
- In office 229 – September or October 246
- Monarch: Sun Quan

Personal details
- Born: Unknown Huai'an, Jiangsu
- Died: June or July 247 (Note: Sun Quan's biography in the Sanguozhi recorded that Bu Zhi died in the 5th month of the 10th year of the Chiwu era of Sun Quan's reign. This month corresponds to 20 June to 19 July 247 in the Gregorian calendar.)
- Relations: Bu Lianshi (relative)
- Children: Bu Xie; Bu Chan
- Occupation: Military general, politician
- Courtesy name: Zishan (子山)
- Peerage: Marquis of Linxiang (臨湘侯)

Bu Zhi (died June or July 247), courtesy name Zishan, was the fourth Imperial Chancellor of the state of Eastern Wu during the Three Kingdoms period of China. Originally a scholar of humble background, he became a subordinate of the warlord Sun Quan in the late Eastern Han dynasty and gradually rose through the ranks. Between 210 and 220, he served as the governor of the remote and restive Jiao Province in southern China. During the Battle of Xiaoting/Yiling of 221–222, he quelled local uprisings in Sun Quan's territories in southern Jing Province and maintained peace in the area. After Sun Quan became emperor in 229, Bu Zhi oversaw the Wu armed forces guarding the Wu–Shu border at Xiling (present-day Yichang, Hubei) for about 20 years. During this time, he also gave advice to Sun Quan's first heir apparent, Sun Deng, and spoke up for officials affected by Lü Yi's abuses of power. In 246, he became the fourth Imperial Chancellor of Wu, but died in office in the following year.

Bu Zhi was known for being magnanimous, generous and capable of putting up with indignities – these traits earned him much respect from many people, including his enemies. He was able to hide his emotions well and project a calm and serious demeanour. However, the historian Pei Songzhi criticised Bu Zhi for supporting Sun Quan's fourth son Sun Ba in the succession struggle against Sun Quan's second heir apparent Sun He, and added that this incident left a huge stain on Bu Zhi's good reputation.

== Family background ==
Bu Zhi was from Huaiyin County (淮陰縣), Linhuai Commandery (臨淮郡), which is around present-day Huai'an, Jiangsu. He traced his ancestry to Yangshi (揚食), an aristocrat of the Jin state in the Spring and Autumn period. As Yangshi's estate was located in an area called "Bu" (步; around present-day Linfen County, Shanxi), his descendants adopted "Bu" as their family name. One of Yangshi's descendants was Bu Shusheng (步叔乘; or Bu Shucheng), a disciple of Confucius. Sometime in the early Western Han dynasty, a certain General Bu received the peerage "Marquis of Huaiyin" (淮陰侯) from the emperor as a reward for his contributions in battle. Bu Zhi descended from this General Bu, whose marquisate was in Huaiyin County.

== Early life ==
When chaos broke out in central China towards the end of the Eastern Han dynasty, Bu Zhi fled south to the Jiangdong region to avoid trouble. Alone and penniless, he befriended one Wei Jing (衞旌) (Note: Wei Jing's courtesy name was Ziqi (子旗). He became a Master of Writing (尚書) later in the state of Eastern Wu during the Three Kingdoms period.) from Guangling Commandery (廣陵郡) who was around the same age as him. They farmed crops to feed themselves. Bu Zhi tirelessly toiled in the fields in the day and diligently read books at night. He became very well-read and well-versed in various arts and crafts. He was known for being magnanimous, deep thinking, and able to put up with indignities.

Bu Zhi and Wei Jing settled in Kuaiji Commandery (會稽郡), where they encountered an influential landlord, Jiao Zhengqiang (焦征羌), (Note: Jiao Zhengqiang's actual name was Jiao Jiao (焦矯). He was called "Zhengqiang" because he was formerly the Prefect (令) of Zhengqiang County (征羌縣; around present-day Shaoling District, Luohe, Henan).) who allowed his retainers to behave lawlessly. As Bu Zhi and Wei Jing feared that Jiao Zhengqiang would seize the plot of land on which they farmed, they decided to offer him some of their produce as tribute. When they arrived at his residence, he was asleep so they had to wait outside. After some time, Wei Jing became impatient and wanted to leave, but Bu Zhi stopped him and said, "We came here because we feared he would seize our land. If we come here to visit him and then leave without even meeting him, he might think that we're insulting him and we'll only end up antagonising him." After a while, Jiao Zhengqiang woke up, saw them through the window, and instructed his servants to lay mats on the ground for them to sit outside while he remained indoors. Wei Jing was enraged but Bu Zhi remained calm and composed. When it was time for lunch, Jiao Zhengqiang feasted on tasty dishes and did not invite them to join him. Instead, he had scraps of food served to them in small bowls. Wei Jing, who received only vegetables and mushrooms, was so unhappy that he did not eat at all. In contrast, Bu Zhi finished all the food he got. They then bid farewell to Jiao Zhengqiang and left. Wei Jing later scolded Bu Zhi, "How can you put up with this?" Bu Zhi replied, "We're of lowly status. He treated us in a manner befitting our status. What's there to be ashamed of?"

== Service under Sun Quan ==
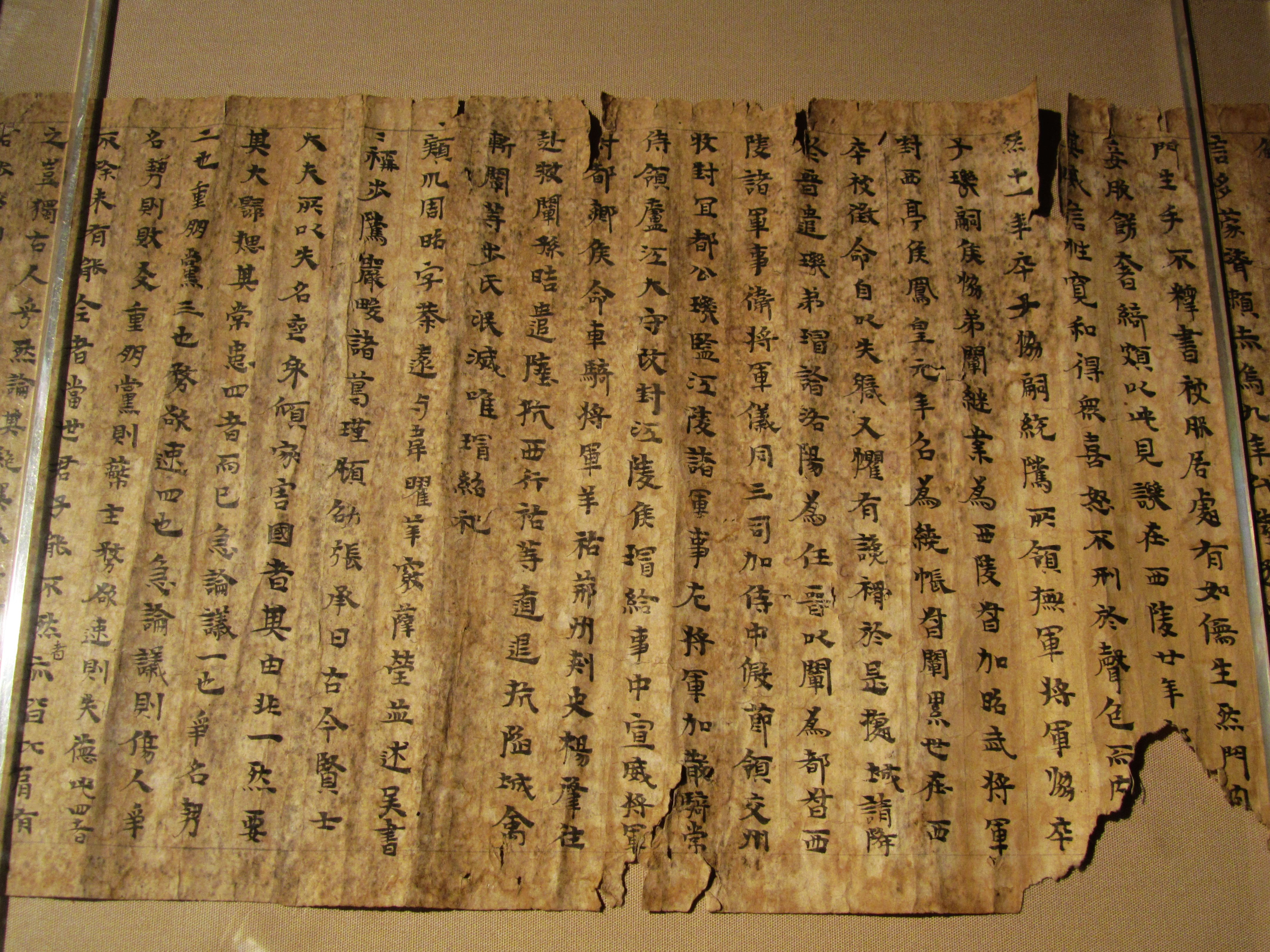
A fragment of the biography of Bu Zhi from the Records of the Three Kingdoms, part of the Dunhuang manuscripts

Sometime in the 200s, when the warlord Sun Quan held the nominal appointment General Who Attacks Barbarians (討虜將軍), (Note: Sun Quan was appointed General Who Attacks Barbarians in 200 CE.) he recruited Bu Zhi to serve as his Chief Scribe (主記), and later appointed him as the Chief (長) of Haiyan County (海鹽縣; present-day Pinghu, Zhejiang). After holding office in Haiyan County for a few years, Bu Zhi claimed that he was ill and resigned. He then travelled around the Wu territories with Zhuge Jin and Yan Jun. During this time, he earned himself a fine reputation as a learned man.

In 209, Sun Quan was appointed as acting General of Chariots and Cavalry (車騎將軍) and acting Governor (牧) of Xu Province. Bu Zhi returned to serve under Sun Quan as an Assistant in the East Bureau (東曹掾) of the office of the General of Chariots and Cavalry and Assistant Officer in the Headquarters Office (治中從事) of the Governor of Xu Province. Sun Quan also nominated Bu Zhi as a maocai (茂才).

=== Governorship of Jiao Province ===
In 210, Sun Quan appointed Bu Zhi as the Administrator (太守) of Poyang Commandery (鄱陽郡; around present-day Poyang County, Jiangxi). Within the same year, however, he promoted Bu Zhi to Inspector (刺史) of Jiao Province. Bu Zhi was also concurrently appointed General of the Household of Martial Establishment (立武中郎將) and put in charge of a military unit comprising over 1,000 elite archers for his mission to Jiao Province.

Since the time of Emperor Ling (r. 168–189), Jiao Province, being a remote province in the south, had posed serious problems for the Han central government. The locals, unwilling to submit to Han rule, had caused much trouble for their Han-appointed governors – two governors, Zhu Fu (朱符) and Zhang Jin (張津), were killed while in office.

In the following year, Sun Quan granted Bu Zhi greater authority and promoted him to General of the Household Who Attacks the South (征南中郎將). When Bu Zhi arrived in Jiao Province, Wu Ju (吴巨), a commandery administrator in the province, pretended to cooperate with him while harbouring ill intentions. Bu Zhi lured Wu Ju into a trap and executed him. His actions shocked the other elites in Jiao Province including the minor warlord Shi Xie, who led his followers to submit to Bu Zhi and pledge allegiance to Sun Quan. The whole of Jiao Province thus came under Sun Quan's control, with Bu Zhi as the governor.

Sometime in the 210s, Yong Kai (雍闓), a tribal chief in Yi Province (covering present-day Sichuan and Chongqing), killed Zheng Ang (正昂), a commandery administrator appointed by the warlord Liu Bei. Yong Kai contacted Shi Xie and asked to defect to Sun Quan's side. Shi Xie relayed the message to Bu Zhi, who sent an emissary to meet Yong Kai and accept his allegiance. In recognition of Bu Zhi's achievements, Sun Quan appointed him as General Who Pacifies the Rong (平戎將軍) and enfeoffed him as the Marquis of Guangxin (廣信侯).

=== Maintaining peace in southern Jing Province ===
In 220, Sun Quan ordered Lü Dai to replace Bu Zhi as the Inspector of Jiao Province. Bu Zhi then led over 10,000 volunteer troops from Jiao Province to Changsha Commandery (長沙郡; around present-day Changsha, Hunan). About a year later, Liu Bei, the emperor of the state of Shu Han, launched a military campaign to attack Sun Quan in retaliation against Sun Quan's seizing of his territories in Jing Province in late 219. This subsequently led to the Battle of Xiaoting/Yiling of 221–222. During this time, some local tribes in Wuling Commandery (武陵郡; around present-day Changde, Hunan) in southern Jing Province rebelled against Sun Quan's rule. Sun Quan ordered Bu Zhi to lead troops to Yiyang County (益陽縣; east of present-day Yiyang County, Hunan) to guard against attacks from the rebels.

Even after Sun Quan's forces defeated Liu Bei at the Battle of Xiaoting/Yiling in mid 222, there was still much unrest in Lingling (零陵; around present-day Yongzhou, Hunan) and Guiyang (桂陽; around present-day Chenzhou, Hunan) commanderies in southern Jing Province. Bu Zhi led his troops to quell the uprisings and restored peace in the region.

In 223, Sun Quan promoted Bu Zhi to General of the Right (右將軍) and Left Protector of the Army (左護軍), and changed his marquis title to "Marquis of Linxiang" (臨湘侯). In 226, he granted greater powers to Bu Zhi and ordered him to move to a garrison at Oukou (漚口).

== Service in the state of Eastern Wu ==
In 229, after Sun Quan declared himself emperor and established the state of Eastern Wu, he appointed Bu Zhi as General of Agile Cavalry (驃騎將軍) and the nominal Governor (牧) of Ji Province. (Note: Ji Province was controlled by Eastern Wu's rival state, Cao Wei, so Bu Zhi was only the Governor in name.) In the following year, he reassigned Bu Zhi to Xiling (西陵; present-day Xiling District, Yichang, Hubei) and replace Lu Xun as the military commander guarding the border between Eastern Wu and its ally state, Shu Han. He was relieved of his nominal gubernatorial appointment of Ji Province later. (Note: In 229, the allied states of Eastern Wu and Shu Han reached an agreement on how to divide, between the two of them, all the provinces controlled by their rival state, Cao Wei, if they managed to conquer it one day. Under the agreement, Yu, Qing, Xu and You provinces would go to Eastern Wu, while Yan, Ji and Bing provinces would go to Shu Han.)

=== Advice to Sun Deng ===
Around the time, Sun Quan's heir apparent, Sun Deng, who was stationed in Wuchang (武昌; present-day Ezhou, Hubei), was actively networking with many people. He wrote to Bu Zhi, seeking his advice on whom he should talk to first because he knew little about the officials in Eastern Wu. In his reply to Sun Deng, Bu Zhi named 11 notable officials serving in Jing Province – Zhuge Jin, Lu Xun, Zhu Ran, Cheng Pu, Pan Jun, Pei Xuan (裴玄), Xiahou Cheng (夏侯承), Wei Jing (衞旌), Li Su (李肅), Zhou Tiao (周條) and Shi Gan (石幹) – and appraised them individually. He also advised Sun Deng to refrain from micromanaging, and instead learn from great rulers such as Duke Huan of Qi and Emperor Gao of Han, who delegated the task of governing their empires to their premiers (e.g. Guan Zhong, Xiao He). He also urged Sun Deng to attract as many talents as possible to join him.

=== Saving officials from Lü Yi's abuses of power ===
Sun Quan had appointed Lü Yi, whom he highly trusted, as the supervisor of the audit bureau. Lü Yi abused his powers by picking on trivialities and framing numerous officials under his watch for committing serious offences. He also freely abused his powers to investigate and prosecute officials, some of whom were arrested, imprisoned and tortured. Even officials like Zhu Ju, a high-ranking general, and Gu Yong, the Imperial Chancellor, fell victim to Lü Yi's malice.

Bu Zhi wrote to Sun Quan at least four times to speak up against Lü Yi's abuses of power. He also advised Sun Quan to rely on capable officials such as Gu Yong, Lu Xun and Pan Jun. He pointed out that there were far too many bureaucrats in the administration and urge Sun Quan to dismiss them.

Sun Quan eventually discovered the truth, understood the gravity of the situation, and had Lü Yi removed from office and executed. Throughout this entire saga, Bu Zhi wrote to Sun Quan numerous times, recommending him to rehabilitate Lü Yi's victims and defending those who were wrongly accused. Sun Quan, however, did not accept every piece of advice from Bu Zhi. Nevertheless, Bu Zhi's efforts ultimately saved many officials from doom.

=== Role in the succession struggle between Sun He and Sun Ba ===
Sometime in the 240s, a power struggle broke out between two of Sun Quan's sons – Sun He, the Crown Prince and Sun Ba, the Prince of Lu – with both of them fighting over the succession to their father's throne. The conflict had a polarising effect on Sun Quan's subjects and led to the emergence of two opposing factions: On one side, Lu Xun, Zhuge Ke, Gu Tan, Zhu Ju, Teng Yin, Shi Ji, Ding Mi (丁密) and Wu Can believed that Sun He was the rightful heir apparent so they supported him. On the other side, Bu Zhi, Lü Dai, Quan Cong, Lü Ju, Sun Hong (孫弘), Quan Ji (全寄), Yang Zhu (楊笁), Wu An (吳安) and Sun Qi (孫奇) supported Sun Ba. In 250, Sun Quan put an end to the conflict by forcing Sun Ba to commit suicide, and deposing Sun He and replacing him with Sun Liang as Crown Prince. Some of the officials involved in the succession struggle were executed, exiled or removed from office, but Bu Zhi remained unaffected.

The historian Pei Songzhi criticised Bu Zhi for supporting Sun Ba, because he deemed Sun Ba's claim to the succession as illegitimate given that Sun Quan had already designated Sun He as the heir apparent. He also remarked that this incident had a huge negative impact on Bu Zhi in particular, because Bu Zhi had a reputation for being virtuous and generous.

=== Final years as Imperial Chancellor ===
Bu Zhi once wrote a memorial to Sun Quan to tell him that he heard from Wang Qian (王潛) and other defectors that the Wei forces were planning to fill up the Yangtze River with sandbags and launch an attack on the Wu-controlled territories in Jing Province. Sun Quan doubted it and said that if that really happened, he would have 1,000 cattle slaughtered for a feast in Bu Zhi's honour. Some years later, he told Lü Fan and Zhuge Ke: "Every time I read Bu Zhi's memorial, I can't stop laughing. The river has existed since the beginning of life. How can anyone use sandbags to fill it up?"

In 246, Bu Zhi succeeded Lu Xun as the Imperial Chancellor (丞相). Even after assuming the highest office in the Wu government, he never stopped reading and giving lectures to his students. His attire and living quarters also resembled those of a Confucian scholar. However, behind the walls of his residence, his wife and concubine(s) wore expensive dresses and jewellery. Some people ridiculed him because of that.

Over the 20 years he was stationed in Xiling (西陵; present-day Xiling District, Yichang, Hubei), Bu Zhi had gained the respect of enemies from the neighbouring areas. He was known for being magnanimous and generous, and was able to win the hearts of people. He was also able to hide his emotions well and project a calm and serious demeanour. He died sometime between 20 June and 19 July 247.

== Descendants and relatives ==
Bu Zhi had two sons: Bu Xie (步恊) and Bu Chan (步闡), as well as a relative, Lady Bu.

=== Bu Xie ===
After Bu Zhi's death, Bu Xie inherited his father's peerage "Marquis of Linxiang" (臨湘侯) and took command of the troops which used to be under his father's command. Bu Xie also received the rank General Who Pacifies the Army (撫軍將軍). After Bu Xie died, his son, Bu Ji (步璣), inherited the peerage "Marquis of Linxiang".

=== Bu Chan ===
Bu Chan inherited his father's legacy and became the new military commander stationed at Xiling (西陵; present-day Xiling District, Yichang, Hubei) to guard the border. He was also appointed as General of Illustrious Martial Might (昭武將軍) and enfeoffed as the Marquis of Xi Village (西亭侯). In 272, during the reign of the last Wu emperor Sun Hao, Bu Chan was recalled to the imperial capital to serve as the Controller of the Imperial Guards (繞帳督). As Bu Chan and his family had been living in Xiling for several years, he thought that he was being recalled because he had failed to perform his duty well in Xiling. He also feared that he would become a victim of slander and end up in deep trouble, so he defected to the Jin dynasty (Note: In 263, Eastern Wu's rival state, Cao Wei, conquered Eastern Wu's ally state Shu Han. About two years later, the Jin dynasty (266–420) replaced the state of Cao Wei. The Jin dynasty became Eastern Wu's new rival and eventually conquered the latter in 280.) and surrendered Xiling to the enemy.

Bu Chan sent Bu Xie's sons, Bu Ji (步璣) and Bu Xuan (步璿), to the Jin imperial capital, Luoyang. The Jin imperial court permitted him to continue overseeing military affairs in Xiling, in addition to appointing him as General of the Guards (衞將軍) with honours equivalent to those of the Three Ducal Ministers; Palace Attendant (侍中); and Governor (牧) of Jiao Province with imperial authority. Bu Chan was also enfeoffed as the Duke of Yidu (宜都公). Bu Ji was put in charge of supervising military affairs in Jiangling (江陵) and awarded the following appointments: General of the Left (左將軍); Regular Mounted Attendant (散騎常侍); and Administrator (太守) of Lujiang Commandery (廬陵郡). His original peerage, "Marquis of Linxiang", was changed to "Marquis of Jiangling" (江陵侯). Bu Xuan was appointed as an Official Who Concurrently Serves in the Palace (給事中) and General Who Declares Might (宣威將軍), and enfeoffed as a Marquis of a Chief District (都鄉侯).

The Jin imperial court then ordered Yang Hu (General of Chariots and Cavalry) and Yang Zhao (楊肇; Inspector of Jing Province) to lead troops to Xiling to reinforce Bu Chan. The Wu emperor Sun Hao ordered Lu Kang (Lu Xun's son) to lead troops to suppress Bu Chan's rebellion. Lu Kang succeeded in his mission – he drove back the Jin forces, retook Xiling, and captured and executed Bu Chan. The entire Bu family, except for Bu Xuan's branch, was exterminated.

=== Lady Bu ===
Lady Bu, personal name Bu Lianshi (步練師) (Note: While Records of the Three Kingdoms did not record Lady Bu's personal name, the Jiankang Shilu mentioned that her personal name was "Lianshi," so she was also known as "Bu Lianshi."), also known as Empress Bu, was a relative of Bu Zhi who originally lived in Lujiang, but after Sun Ce conquered the region, she moved to Jiangdong, where she became the concubine of Sun Ce's brother, Sun Quan. They had two daughters, Sun Luban and Sun Luyu.

== In Romance of the Three Kingdoms ==
Bu Zhi is a minor character in the 14th-century historical novel Romance of the Three Kingdoms, which romanticises the events before and during the Three Kingdoms period. He first appears in chapter 43 as one of the scholars from Wu who challenged Zhuge Liang to a debate just before the Battle of Red Cliffs. He appears again in chapter 68 as Sun Quan's representative to meet Cao Cao to discuss peace terms after the Battle of Ruxu (217). His final appearance is in Chapter 83 before the Battle of Yiling. When Liu Bei is leading his forces to attack Sun Quan, Bu Zhi suggests to Sun Quan to arrest Fan Qiang (范疆) and Zhang Da (張達) – the men who murdered Zhang Fei – and send them, along with Zhang Fei's head, to Liu Bei as an act of appeasement. Later in the chapter, he voices his objection to Sun Quan putting Lu Xun in command of the Wu army to resist Liu Bei's invasion.

== See also ==
- Lists of people of the Three Kingdoms
