= Empress Jinghuai =

Concubine of Eastern Wu emperor, Sun Quan

Lady Wang 王夫人
- Born: Unknown
- Died: Unknown
- Burial: Gong'an (modern-day Gong'an, Hubei); Jing Tombs (modern location unknown) (reinterment)
- Spouse: Sun Quan
- Issue: Sun Xiu
Posthumous name
- Empress Jinghuai (敬懷皇后)

Empress Jinghuai, known during her life as Lady Wang, was a concubine of Sun Quan, the founding emperor of the state of Eastern Wu and mother to future Emperor Sun Xiu, during the Three Kingdoms period of China. She had active participation in the various succession disputes to the throne, being on the warfoot with Sun Luban, daughter of Sun Quan.

== Life ==
Lady Wang was from Nanyang (南陽, modern-day Nanyang, Henan), and was referred to as Lady Wang of Nanyang to distinguish her from Lady Wang of Langye (posthumously known as Empress Dayi, another concubine of Sun Quan who shared the same surname). She entered Sun Quan's harem during the Jiahe period (232-238), presumably before 235 when she gave birth to Sun Xiu. When Sun He became heir apparent, Lady Wang of Langye became esteemed, and all other consorts who had been favoured by Sun Quan were expelled from the palace, including Lady Wang of Nanyang, who was exiled to Gong'an (公安, modern-day Gong'an, Hubei), where she died and was initially buried.

== Family and relatives ==
When Sun Xiu became emperor in 258, he posthumously honoured Lady Wang as Empress Jinghuai (敬懷皇后 Attentive Remembering Empress) and had her remains reinterred at the Jing Tombs (敬陵), the modern location of which is unknown. As the Wang family had no male-line descendants, her maternal half-brother Wen Yong (文雍) was given a commune marquisate.
