= Sun Luyu =

Eastern Wu imperial princess (died 255)

Sun Luyu 孫魯育
- Princess Zhu (朱公主)
- Born: Unknown (Note: While Lady Sun's birth year is not recorded, her mother joined Sun Quan's harem after 199 (Sun Ce's invasion of Lujiang). In additional, she was of a suitable age for marriage in 229. Thus, her birth year should be between 199 and 220.)
- Died: August or September 255; Nanjing, Jiangsu
- Spouse: Zhu Ju, Marquis of Yunyang (m. 229); Liu Zuan (m. 250)
- Issue: Empress Jing
Names
- Family name: Sun (孫); Given name: Luyu (魯育); Courtesy name: Xiaohu (小虎)
- House: House of Sun
- Father: Sun Quan
- Mother: Bu Lianshi

Sun Luyu (died August or September 255), courtesy name Xiaohu, was an imperial princess of the state of Eastern Wu during the Three Kingdoms period of China. She was the younger daughter of Sun Quan, the founding emperor of Wu, and his concubine Bu Lianshi. She is also referred to as Princess Zhu (朱公主/朱主) because of her marriage to Zhu Ju.

== Life ==
Sun Luyu was the younger daughter of Sun Quan, the founding emperor of Eastern Wu, and his concubine Bu Lianshi. She had an elder sister, Sun Luban. The sisters' courtesy names, Xiaohu (小虎) and Dahu (大虎), respectively mean "small tiger" and "big tiger". Sun Luyu initially married Zhu Ju, a general who briefly served as the fifth Imperial Chancellor of Wu. She and Zhu Ju had a daughter, who married Sun Quan's sixth son, Sun Xiu, who was also a half-brother of Sun Luyu.

In the 240s, a power struggle broke out between two of Sun Quan's sons – Sun He, the Crown Prince and Sun Ba, the Prince of Lu – with both of them fighting over the position of Crown Prince. The power struggle had a polarising effect on Sun Quan's subjects; two opposing factions, each supporting either Sun He or Sun Ba, emerged from among them. During this time, Sun Luyu's husband Zhu Ju supported Sun He, while Sun Luyu's sister Sun Luban and her husband Quan Cong sided with Sun Ba. When Sun Luban tried to get Sun Luyu to support Sun Ba, Sun Luyu refused and became estranged from her sister as a result.

In 250, the power struggle came to an end when Sun Quan forced Sun Ba to commit suicide and deposed Sun He from his position as Crown Prince. Many of the officials involved in the power struggle were executed, exiled or removed from office. Sun Luyu's husband, Zhu Ju, was demoted and reassigned to a new post in Xindu Commandery (新都郡; around present-day Chun'an County, Zhejiang). While Zhu Ju was en route to Xindu Commandery, Sun Hong (孫弘), one of Sun Ba's supporters, took advantage of Sun Quan's poor health to issue a fake imperial decree ordering Zhu Ju to commit suicide. Zhu Ju thought that the decree was genuine so he killed himself as ordered. The general Liu Zuan (劉纂) had previously married Sun Quan's second daughter (a half-sister of Sun Luban and Sun Luyu), but she died early, so Sun Quan arranged for him to marry the widowed Sun Luyu.

In August or September 255 during Sun Liang's reign, Sun Yi (孫儀) and others plotted to overthrow the regent Sun Jun, but were discovered and executed before they could carry out their plan. Sun Luban, who had a secret affair with Sun Jun after her husband Quan Cong died in 249, seized the opportunity to falsely accuse her estranged sister Sun Luyu of being involved in the plot. Sun Jun believed Sun Luban and had Sun Luyu arrested and executed. She was buried at Shizigang (石子崗; literally "stones hill"), a hill in present-day Yuhuatai District, Nanjing, Jiangsu.

== Postmortem events ==
After Sun Jun died in 256, his cousin Sun Chen succeeded him as the regent for the Wu emperor Sun Liang. Sometime between 256 and 258, Sun Liang suspected that Sun Luban had something to do with Sun Luyu's death, so he summoned his half-sister and questioned her. A fearful Sun Luban lied to him, "I really don't know. I heard it from Zhu Ju's sons, Zhu Xiong (朱熊) and Zhu Sun (朱損). (Note: Although Zhu Xiong (朱熊) and Zhu Sun (朱損) were Zhu Ju's sons, it is not known who their mother(s) was/were. They were most probably born to Zhu Ju's concubine(s), so Sun Luyu, as Zhu Ju's wife, would have been their stepmother.)" Sun Liang thought that Zhu Xiong and Zhu Sun betrayed Sun Luyu to Sun Jun – especially since Zhu Sun married Sun Jun's younger sister – so he ordered Ding Feng to execute Zhu Xiong and Zhu Sun.

In 258, Sun Chen deposed Sun Liang and replaced him with Sun Xiu, Sun Quan's sixth son, as the third emperor of Wu. Sun Xiu's wife, Lady Zhu, was the daughter of Zhu Ju and Sun Luyu. On 18 January 259, Sun Xiu staged a coup d'état against the regent Sun Chen, succeeded in ousting him from power, and ordered Sun Chen and his entire family to be executed. Sun Xiu also had Sun Jun's dead body unearthed and stripped of the honours accorded to him, and posthumously rehabilitated the people who were executed during Sun Jun and Sun Chen's regencies. Sun Luyu was one of them.

Sometime between 6 November and 5 December 264, Sun Hao, the fourth emperor of Wu, ordered Sun Luyu's remains to be unearthed and reburied with honours befitting her status as a princess. The Soushen Ji recorded an account as follows:

[Sun Hao] wanted to have [Sun Luyu]'s remains unearthed and properly reburied, but the graves all looked the same and he could not tell which was hers. Some palace servants claimed they could remember the clothes she wore when she died, so [Sun Hao] ordered two shamans to separately summon her spirit and observe closely. After some time, the shamans saw a woman in her 30s dressed in purple and white, wearing a blue patterned headpiece and red silk shoes. She walked up the hill to the middle, placed her hands on her knees and sighed, and stopped there for a while before walking towards a grave. She wandered around the grave and disappeared suddenly. The descriptions given separately by the two shamans were very similar. When her coffin was opened, they saw that her appearance was exactly as described.

== See also ==
- Lists of people of the Three Kingdoms
- Eastern Wu family trees#Sun Quan
