= Quan Cong =

3rd-century Chinese Eastern Wu general

- 全琮

Left Military Adviser (左軍師)
- In office September or October 246 – 247 or 249
- Monarch: Sun Quan

Right Grand Marshal (右大司馬)
- In office September or October 246 – 247 or 249
- Monarch: Sun Quan

Governor of Xu Province (徐州牧) (nominal)
- In office 229 – September or October 246
- Monarch: Sun Quan

Left Protector of the Army (左護軍)
- In office 229 – September or October 246
- Monarch: Sun Quan

General of the Guards (衛將軍)
- In office 229 – September or October 246
- Monarch: Sun Quan

Administrator of Dong'an (東安太守)
- In office 226 – 229
- Monarch: Sun Quan

Administrator of Jiujiang (九江太守)
- In office 223 – 226
- Monarch: Sun Quan

General who Pacifies the South (綏南將軍)
- In office 223 – 229
- Monarch: Sun Quan

Lieutenant-General (偏將軍)
- In office 220 – 223
- Monarch: Sun Quan

Colonel of Vehement Might (奮威校尉)
- In office ? – 220

Personal details
- Born: 196 or 198 (Note: Quan Cong's biography in the Sanguozhi recorded that he died in the 12th year of the Chiwu era of Sun Quan's reign. This corresponds to the year 249 in the Gregorian calendar. However, Sun Quan's biography in the Sanguozhi recorded that Quan Cong died in the 1st month of the 10th year of the Chiwu era. This month corresponds to 22 February to 23 March 247 in the Gregorian calendar. It is unclear which date is the correct one. The Jiankang Shilu also recorded that Quan Cong was 52 (by East Asian age reckoning) when he died in the winter of the 12th year of the Chiwu era. By calculation, Quan Cong was born in either 196 or 198 depending on whether his year of death was 247 or 249.) Hangzhou, Zhejiang
- Died: 247 or 249 (aged 51)
- Spouse: Sun Luban
- Relations: see this section
- Children: Quan Xu; Quan Ji; Quan Yi; Quan Wu
- Parent: Quan Rou (father)
- Occupation: Military general
- Courtesy name: Zihuang (子璜)
- Peerage: Marquis of Qiantang (錢塘侯)

Quan Cong (196–247 or 198–249), courtesy name Zihuang, was a Chinese military general of the state of Eastern Wu during the Three Kingdoms period of China. Born in present-day Hangzhou towards the end of the Eastern Han dynasty, Quan Cong became famous at a young age when he performed acts of charity by giving grain to people suffering from famine and providing shelter to refugees from central China. He started his career under the warlord Sun Quan as a military officer and achieved success in his early career by pacifying the restive Shanyue tribes in the Jiangdong territories. After Sun Quan became an independent ruler of Wu in 222, Quan Cong rose to the rank of General and participated in battles against Wu's rival state Wei. He also pacified rebellions by local tribes in Danyang, Wu and Kuaiji commanderies. After Sun Quan became emperor in 229, Quan Cong married his daughter Sun Luban and became one of his most trusted generals. During this time, although he was less active in battles, he became more outspoken on state affairs. He strongly objected to Sun Quan's decision to let his heir apparent Sun Deng lead troops into battle because it was against traditions, and attempted to dissuade Sun Quan from launching an invasion of Zhuya (present-day Hainan) and Yizhou (believed to be present-day Taiwan). Towards the end of his life, he became embroiled in a power struggle between Sun Quan's sons Sun He and Sun Ba over the succession to their father's throne. Although he supported Sun Ba, he died before he could see the power struggle end in 250 with neither Sun He nor Sun Ba becoming the new heir apparent. Throughout his life, Quan Cong was known for being a respectful and agreeable man who remained humble despite his high social status and prestige. As a military commander, he was known for being courageous and decisive, and for conducting himself with dignity and often taking the bigger picture into consideration.

== Early life ==
Quan Cong was born in Qiantang County (錢唐縣), Wu Commandery (吳郡), which is in present-day Hangzhou, Zhejiang, towards the end of the Eastern Han dynasty. His father, Quan Rou (全柔), served as the Administrator of Guiyang Commandery (桂陽郡; around present-day Chenzhou, Hunan) under the warlord Sun Quan. (Note: Quan Rou (全柔) was nominated as a xiaolian (civil service candidate) during the reign of Emperor Ling (r. 168–189) and served in the Han imperial capital Luoyang as a secretarial assistant. When the warlord Dong Zhuo came to power and controlled the Han central government between 189 and 192, Quan Rou resigned, left Luoyang and returned to his hometown. The governor of Yang Province, which Wu Commandery was part of, recruited Quan Rou to serve as an assistant officer in the provincial office. The Han central government later commissioned Quan Rou as the Commandant of the East Section of Kuaiji Commandery (會稽東部都尉). Between 194 and 199, when the warlord Sun Ce led his forces to attack and conquer the territories in the Jiangdong (or Wu) region, Quan Rou was one of the first few local leaders to rally his men to support Sun Ce. In return, Sun Ce nominated Quan Rou to the Han central government to serve as the Commandant of Danyang Commandery. Around early 210, after Sun Quan received the nominal appointment of General of Chariots and Cavalry (車騎將軍) from the Han central government, he designated Quan Rou as his Chief Clerk (長史) and later appointed him as the Administrator of Guiyang Commandery (桂陽郡; around present-day Chenzhou, Hunan).)

Sometime in the 210s, Quan Cong received instructions from his father to sell a shipment of a few thousand hu of grain in Wu Commandery. However, he distributed the grain for free in Wu Commandery instead of selling it, and returned to Guiyang Commandery with nothing. When his angry father demanded an explanation, Quan Cong knelt down, kowtowed and said: "Selling the grain wasn't the most important issue. Many county officials were facing a desperate crisis as their people didn’t have enough food, so I decided to use the grain to help those needy people. As it was very urgent, I didn't have enough time to inform you and seek your permission." After hearing his son's explanation, Quan Rou felt very impressed with his charitable actions. (Note: The fourth-century historian Xu Zhong (徐衆) argued that it was improper for a son, while serving his father, to have personal wealth or perform charitable acts because he would overshadow his father. His view was that Quan Cong did not fulfil his role as a son because he abandoned the task assigned to him by his father in favour of performing actions to boost his own fame. The fifth-century historian Pei Songzhi had a different view. Although he agreed that Quan Cong failed in his duty as a son when he gave away his father's grain for free, he also pointed out that Quan Cong did so for a greater purpose – to help needy people facing a food shortage. He remarked that Xu Zhong would have had misunderstood the good intentions behind the charitable acts of Quan Cong and other historical figures such as Feng Nuan (馮煖) and Ji An (汲黯) if he actually believed that they did so to boost their personal fame.)

At the time, there were many refugees who fled their homes in war-ravaged central China and crossed the Yangtze to take shelter in the south. Quan Cong took in hundreds of these refugees and spent his entire family fortune on providing them with necessities. He became famous for his kind deeds.

== Career in the Eastern Han dynasty ==
Sun Quan later commissioned Quan Cong as Colonel of Vehement Might (奮威校尉), put him in command of a few thousand troops, and ordered him to attack the restive Shanyue tribes, who started rebellions from time to time. Quan Cong also managed to recruit over 10,000 elite soldiers to serve in his army and stationed them at Niuzhu (牛渚; in present-day Ma'anshan, Anhui). He was then promoted to Lieutenant-General (偏將軍) for his achievements.

=== Invasion of Jing Province ===
Between August and December 219, Guan Yu, a general serving under Sun Quan's ally Liu Bei, led his troops to attack Fancheng (樊城; in present-day Xiangyang, Hubei), a stronghold guarded by Cao Ren, a general serving under Sun Quan and Liu Bei's rival Cao Cao. During this time, Quan Cong wrote a letter to Sun Quan to urge him to take advantage of the opportunity to break his alliance with Liu Bei and seize control of Liu Bei's territories in southern Jing Province, which were guarded by Guan Yu.

Around the same time, Sun Quan had already secretly ordered his general Lü Meng to lead a stealth invasion of Liu Bei's territories in Jing Province. He was worried that his plan would be leaked out so he did not respond to Quan Cong's letter and kept it hidden.

By early February 220, Lü Meng had successfully conquered all of Liu Bei's territories in Jing Province. Guan Yu was captured in an ambush and subsequently executed on Sun Quan's order after he refused to surrender. After the victory, Sun Quan threw a feast in Gong'an County to honour Lü Meng for his achievement and celebrate their success. During the feast, he told Quan Cong: "Although I didn't respond to the letter you sent me earlier, I still want to give you credit for today's victory." He then enfeoffed Quan Cong as the Marquis of Yanghua Village (陽華亭侯).

== Career in Eastern Wu ==
In December 220, Cao Pi usurped the throne from Emperor Xian, the last emperor of the Eastern Han dynasty, and established the state of Wei with himself as the new emperor. This event marked the end of the Eastern Han dynasty and the beginning of the Three Kingdoms period in China.

On 23 September 221, Cao Pi awarded Sun Quan the title "King of Wu" (吳王) after the latter pledged allegiance to him and agreed to become a vassal of Wei. However, in November 222, Sun Quan broke ties with Cao Pi and proclaim himself an independent ruler of his Wu state. He continued to rule under the title "King of Wu" and did not declare himself emperor until 229.

=== Battle of Dongkou ===
In October 222, the Wei emperor Cao Pi sent a naval fleet to attack the Wu position at Dongkou (洞口; along the Yangtze near present-day Liyang, Jiangsu). In response, Sun Quan ordered Lü Fan, Quan Cong and others to lead the Wu forces to resist the invaders.

During the battle, Quan Cong led armoured soldiers to patrol the riverbank round the clock, and repel frequent raids by small groups of Wei marines. Some time later, a Wei general Yin Lu (尹盧) led a few thousand troops to cross the river and launch an attack. Quan Cong led his men to engage the enemy and succeeded in driving them back and killing Yin Lu in battle.

As a reward for his achievement, Quan Cong was promoted to General Who Pacifies the South (綏南將軍). He was also elevated from the status of a village marquis to a county marquis under the title "Marquis of Qiantang" (錢唐侯).

In 225, Sun Quan granted Quan Cong acting imperial authority and appointed him as the Administrator of Jiujiang Commandery (九江郡; around present-day Quanjiao County, Anhui).

=== Battle of Shiting ===
In 228, Sun Quan moved to Wan County (皖縣; present-day Qianshan County, Anhui), where he ordered Quan Cong to join Lu Xun in launching an attack on Wei forces led by Cao Xiu. They succeeded in their mission and defeated Cao Xiu at the Battle of Shiting.

=== As the Administrator of Dong'an ===
Around the time, the local tribes in Danyang, Wu and Kuaiji commanderies frequently rebelled against Wu imperial rule and attacked counties in the region. Sun Quan identified the more restive areas within the three commanderies and created a new commandery, Dong'an Commandery (東安郡), to administer these areas. He then appointed Quan Cong as the Administrator of this commandery, whose headquarters were at Fuchun County (富春縣; in present-day Hangzhou, Zhejiang).

After arriving in Fuchun County, Quan Cong took careful measures to reestablish law and order by ensuring that rewards and punishments were given out fairly. He also managed to persuade and induce the local tribes to surrender to him. Throughout the many years he held office, Quan Cong succeeded in getting over 10,000 people to submit to Wu imperial rule.

=== Visiting his hometown ===
Following Quan Cong's success in pacifying the local tribes, Sun Quan abolished Dong'an Commandery and reassigned Quan Cong back to his previous post at Niuzhu (牛渚; in present-day Ma'anshan, Anhui). On his journey to Niuzhu, Quan Cong passed by Qiantang County (錢唐縣; in present-day Hangzhou, Zhejiang) and decided to visit his hometown. He paid his respects at his ancestors' tombs and had them repaired and cleaned up. When he travelled around, he had a ceremonial procession to accompany him. Before leaving, he hosted a party for all his relatives, friends and fellow townsfolk, and generously gave out gifts and presents to them. He was the pride of his hometown.

=== Marriage to Sun Luban ===
After Sun Quan formally declared himself emperor on 23 May 229, he promoted Quan Cong to the position of General of the Guards (衞將軍) with the concurrent appointments of Left Protector of the Army (左護軍) and nominal Governor of Xu Province (徐州牧). In the same year, Quan Cong married Sun Luban, the elder daughter of Sun Quan and his concubine Bu Lianshi.

=== Objection to sending Sun Deng into battle ===
On one occasion, Sun Quan ordered his eldest son and crown prince, Sun Deng, to lead troops into battle. None of his subjects dared to object to his decision.

Quan Cong wrote a secret memorial to the emperor as follows: "Since ancient times, there has never been an instance of a crown prince independently leading troops into battle. A crown prince either plays a supporting role if he accompanies the ruler into battle or serves as regent if he guards the state during the ruler's absence. I am deeply concerned and worried because now the Crown Prince is not acting in accordance with established customs by leading troops into battle."

Sun Quan heeded Quan Cong's advice and ordered Sun Deng to turn back immediately. When it was revealed later that Quan Cong was the one who convinced Sun Quan to change his mind, the former earned much praise for possessing the dignity of a respectable subject of a ruler.

=== Refusing to capture civilians ===
In 233, when Quan Cong led 50,000 infantry and cavalry to attack the Wei-controlled Lu'an County, the people in Lu'an County were so terrified that they fled and scattered in all directions. When his officers suggested sending their men to capture and bring back the civilians, Quan Cong said: "It doesn't reflect well on our State if we exploit the people's plight for such small gains, and make such a risky move without considering the bigger picture. If we send our troops to capture civilians, our potential gains and losses will balance out each other. Is this a well-conceived move then? Even if we manage to capture some civilians, we will neither deal significant damage to the enemy nor fulfil the hopes of our State. If our troops encounter enemy forces along the way, they will sustain heavy casualties. I would rather be held responsible for making no gains in this battle than be blamed for making an ill-calculated and risky move. I won't seek personal glory at the expense of letting down my State."

Sometime between 28 September and 26 October 246, (Note: Sun Quan's biography in the Sanguozhi recorded that Quan Cong was appointed Right Grand Marshal in the 9th month of the 9th year of the Chiwu era of Sun Quan's reign. This month corresponds to 28 September to 26 October 246 in the Gregorian calendar.) Quan Cong was appointed concurrently as Right Grand Marshal (右大司馬) and Left Military Adviser (左軍師).

=== Objection to the Zhuya and Yizhou campaign ===
When Sun Quan wanted to send troops to conquer Zhuya (珠崖; present-day Hainan) and Yizhou (夷州; possibly present-day Taiwan), he asked Quan Cong for his opinion. Quan Cong replied: "Given the imperial might of our State, there is no territory that we can't conquer. However, these are distant and remote lands separated from the mainland by the sea. The local climate and geography may have been quite dangerous for mainlanders since ancient times. When soldiers and civilians live together, they are more likely to fall sick and contagious diseases will spread more easily. When that happens, our soldiers will never be able to come home. What gains would we have made then? I feel very unsettled by the thought of sending our troops, who are supposed to be guarding our borders, on such a risky mission with only a very small chance of success."

Sun Quan did not heed Quan Cong's advice and proceeded with sending forces to invade Zhuya and Yizhou. After 80 to 90 percent of his troops died from illness and disease within the first year of the campaign, Sun Quan started to deeply regret his decision. When he spoke to Quan Cong again, the latter told him: "I think that those who didn't attempt to dissuade Your Majesty from launching this campaign aren't loyal towards Your Majesty."

=== Battle of Quebei ===
In the summer of 241, Quan Cong led Wu forces into battle at Quebei (芍陂; south of present-day Shou County, Anhui) against Wei forces led by Wang Ling. The battle did not go well for the Wu side initially, and they lost five units to the Wei forces. Two Wu officers, Zhang Xiu and Gu Cheng, led their units to resist the Wei forces and managed to halt their advance. Quan Cong's eldest son Quan Xu (全緒) and relative Quan Duan (全端), who were also serving in the Wu army, led their troops to attack the Wei forces after they stopped advancing, and succeeded in driving them back.

After the battle, when Sun Quan was giving rewards to the officers who participated in the battle, he deemed Zhang Xiu and Gu Cheng's contributions greater than those of Quan Xu and Quan Duan because he believed that it was more difficult to halt the enemy advance than to drive back the enemy. As a result, he promoted Zhang Xiu and Gu Cheng to the rank of General, while Quan Xu and Quan Duan were respectively promoted to Lieutenant-General and Major-General only. Due to this incident, the Quans bore a grudge against Gu Cheng and Zhang Xiu and, by extension, against Gu Cheng's brother Gu Tan as well.

=== Role in the succession struggle ===
In the 240s, a power struggle broke out between two of Sun Quan's sons, Sun He and Sun Ba, over the succession to their father's throne. Although Sun Quan had already designated Sun He as crown prince in 242 after his eldest son Sun Deng died in the previous year, he also treated Sun Ba exceptionally well at the same time. Many Wu officials strongly urged Sun Quan to uphold Confucian rules of propriety and ensure that Sun He, as the crown prince, received greater honours and privileges compared to Sun Ba and the other princes. However, Sun Quan failed to clearly distinguish between the relative statuses of the two princes, so a succession struggle broke out between them as Sun Ba started vying for their father's attention and favour while Sun He saw Sun Ba as a threat and tried to counter him.

The succession struggle led to the emergence of two opposing factions from among Sun Quan's subjects. On one side, Lu Xun, Zhuge Ke, Gu Tan, Zhu Ju, Teng Yin, Shi Ji, Ding Mi (丁密) and Wu Can believed that Sun He was the rightful heir apparent so they supported him. On the other side, Bu Zhi, Lü Dai, Quan Cong and his second son Quan Jì, Lü Ju, Sun Hong (孫弘), Yang Zhu (楊笁), Wu An (吳安) and Sun Qi (孫奇) supported Sun Ba.

During the succession struggle, the Quans found an opportunity to take revenge against Gu Cheng and Zhang Xiu. They accused Gu Cheng and Zhang Xiu of secretly collaborating with a staff officer to make false submissions about their contributions during the Battle of Quebei. As a result, Gu Cheng and Zhang Xiu were arrested and thrown into prison, while Gu Cheng's brother Gu Tan, a key supporter of Sun He, was implicated in the case because of his relationship with them. Sun Quan was reluctant to convict Zhang Xiu and the Gu brothers so he asked Gu Tan to publicly apologise for the mistake on behalf of his brother and Zhang Xiu, in the hope that his apology would appease the Quans. However, Gu Tan refused to apologise and insisted that they were innocent. When some officials called for Gu Tan's execution on the grounds of being disrespectful towards the emperor, Sun Quan refused to execute Gu Tan and instead exiled him, Gu Cheng and Zhang Xiu to the remote Jiao Province.

Sun Quan eventually grew tired of the succession struggle and ended it in 250 by deposing Sun He and replacing him with Sun Liang, as well as forcing Sun Ba to commit suicide. A number of the officials involved in the succession struggle, including Quan Cong's second son Quan Jì, were executed, forced to commit suicide, demoted, removed from office, or exiled to distant commanderies.

== Death ==
Before the succession struggle ended in 250, Quan Cong had already died either sometime between 22 February and 23 March 247 (according to Sun Quan's biography in the Sanguozhi) or in the winter of 249 (according to the Jiankang Shilu and his biography in the Sanguozhi) at the age of 52 (by East Asian age reckoning).

In Rafe de Crespigny's A Biographical Dictionary of Later Han to the Three Kingdoms 23-220 AD, Quan Cong's name is romanised as Quan Zong and his year of death is recorded as 247.

== Family and relatives ==
In 229, Quan Cong married Sun Luban, the elder daughter of Sun Quan and his concubine Bu Lianshi. They had two sons: Quan Yì (全懌) and Quan Wu (全吳).

=== Quan Xu ===
Quan Cong's eldest son, Quan Xu (全緒), was already famous since he was an adolescent. Through an invitation from the Wu government, he was commissioned as a military officer upon reaching the age of adulthood. He gradually rose through the ranks to the position of General Who Spreads Martial Might (揚武將軍), and served as the area commander of the Wu garrison at Niuzhu (牛渚; in present-day Ma'anshan, Anhui). He was further promoted to General Who Guards the North (鎮北將軍) after Sun Liang came to the throne. During the Battle of Dongxing in 253, Quan Xu and Ding Feng led a head-on assault on the Wei positions and scored a tactical victory over the enemy. As a reward for his achievement, one of Quan Xu's sons was enfeoffed as a village marquis. Quan Xu died in an unknown year at the age of 43.

Quan Xu had at least two sons: Quan Yī (全禕) and Quan Yí (全儀).

=== Quan Jì ===
Quan Cong's second son, Quan Jì (全寄), did not get along well with Gu Tan, a grandson of the second Wu chancellor Gu Yong, because Gu Tan deemed his behaviour immoral. Quan Jì was involved in the succession struggle between Sun Quan's sons Sun He, and Sun Ba, in the 240s. (Note: See here for details.) After the power struggle ended in 250, Quan Jì, who supported Sun Ba, was forced to commit suicide.

=== Quan Yì ===
Quan Yì (全懌), the elder son of Quan Cong and Sun Luban, succeeded his father as the next Marquis of Qiantang (錢塘侯) and inherited control over the military units that used to be under his father's command. Between 257 and 258, the Wu regent Sun Chen ordered Quan Yì to lead Wu forces to Shouchun (壽春; present-day Shou County, Anhui) to assist the Wei general Zhuge Dan in his rebellion against Wei. The rebellion was ultimately suppressed by Wei forces under the leadership of their regent Sima Zhao. Quan Yì surrendered to Wei after falling for a ruse by Sima Zhao. The Wei government appointed him as General Who Pacifies the East (平東將軍) and enfeoffed him as the Marquis of Linxiang (臨湘侯).

=== Quan Wu ===
Quan Wu (全吳), the younger son of Quan Cong and Sun Luban, was also the youngest among Quan Cong's sons. He was enfeoffed as a Marquis of a Chief District (都鄉侯) by the Wu government.

=== Other relatives ===
Apart from Quan Yì (全懌), the Wu regent Sun Chen had also ordered other members of the Quan clan to lead Wu forces to Shouchun to assist Zhuge Dan in his rebellion against Wei between 257 and 258. They included Quan Jing (全靜), a grandson of Quan Cong; Quan Duan (全端), Quan Pian (全翩) and Quan Jī (全緝), the sons of Quan Cong's cousin(s). Three of Quan Cong's grandsons, Quan Hui (全輝) and Quan Xu's sons Quan Yí (全儀) and Quan Yī (全禕), remained behind in the Wu imperial capital Jianye (present-day Nanjing, Jiangsu). After an internal conflict broke out within the Quan clan, Quan Hui, Quan Yí and Quan Yī brought along their mother and followers, and defected to Wei. Zhong Hui, a close aide to the Wei regent Sima Zhao, instructed Quan Hui and Quan Yí to write a letter to their uncle Quan Yì (全懌), who was in Shouchun with Zhuge Dan. In the letter, Quan Hui and Quan Yí lied that the Wu regent Sun Chen was unhappy with Quan Yì's performance in battle and wanted to execute his entire clan, so they decided to bring along their mother and followers and defect to Wei. Quan Yì believed his nephews and managed to persuade Quan Jing, Quan Duan, Quan Pian and Quan Jī to join him in surrendering to Wei. The Wei regent Sima Zhao was so pleased with the Quans' defection to Wei that he appointed them as commandery-level military officers and awarded each of them a marquis title.

Quan Huijie, the daughter of Quan Cong's relative Quan Shang (全尚), married Sun Liang, the second emperor of Wu, and became his empress consort on 16 February 253. Because of his status as the emperor's father-in-law, Quan Shang was made a marquis and he held high positions in the Wu government. In 258, with Sun Liang's tacit support, Quan Shang and his son Quan Ji (全紀) and the general Liu Cheng (劉承) attempted to launch a coup d'état against the Wu regent Sun Chen. However, Sun Chen caught wind of the plot because Quan Shang had unsuspectingly revealed it to his wife, who was Sun Chen's cousin. Sun Chen had Quan Shang arrested and exiled to Lingling Commandery (零陵郡; around present-day Yongzhou, Hunan), and then sent assassins to kill Quan Shang while he was en route to Lingling. Sun Chen also deposed Sun Liang, replaced him with Sun Xiu, and forced Sun Liang and Quan Huijie to relocate to Houguan County (候官縣; in present-day Fuzhou, Fujian).

Quan Xi (全熙) was a relative of Quan Cong that served in the military, and was one of the generals sent to arrest Zhuge Rong in 253 after the execution of Zhuge Ke (the others were Shi Ji (施績), and Sun Yi (孫壹) the son of Sun Huan (孫奐)). When Zhuge Dan rebelled in 257, Shi Ji and Quan Xi were held off by Wei's general Wang Chang, so they were unable to assist the rebellion. After the defection of Quan Duan and the others in 258, Quan Xi was killed when an unspecified plot leaked, marking the end of the Quan clan's power. (This may refer to the aforementioned plan to overthrow Sun Chen.)

=== Family tree ===
Family tree of the Quan clan

Quan Rou 全柔
Quan Cong 全琮; Zihuang 子璜
Quan Xu 全緒	Quan Jì 全寄	Quan Yì 全懌	Quan Wu 全吳	Quan Duan^{2} 全端	Quan Pian^{2} 全翩	Quan Jī^{2} 全緝	Quan Shang^{2} 全尚; Zizhen 子真
Quan Jing^{1} 全靜	Quan Hui^{1} 全輝	Quan Yī 全禕	Quan Yí 全儀	Quan Ji 全紀	Quan Huijie 全惠解

^{1} Quan Jing and Quan Hui were Quan Cong's grandsons. It is not known who their father(s) was/were.
^{2} Quan Duan, Quan Pian, Quan Jī and Quan Shang were Quan Cong's relatives and they were one generation younger than him. Their exact relationships with him are not known.

== Appraisal ==
Quan Cong was known for being a respectful and agreeable person who was good at reading people's emotions and reacting positively to others' advice. He was mindful of his speech and words, and was never known to have been disrespectful towards anyone before. After he became Sun Quan's son-in-law and one of the emperor's most trusted generals, his family members and relatives also benefited as Sun Quan favoured them, appointed them to high positions, and often bestowed them with wealth and riches. Despite his fame and prestige, Quan Cong remained humble when he interacted with people and never showed any signs of arrogance.

As a soldier, Quan Cong was known for being courageous and decisive, and was always prepared to sacrifice his life when he encountered critical situations in battle. After he became a commander, he conducted himself with dignity and showed good awareness of his responsibilities. When it came to making plans in battle, he often took the bigger picture into consideration and tended to avoid actions that would yield only petty gains.

Chen Shou, the third-century historian who wrote Quan Cong's biography in the Sanguozhi, praised Quan Cong and other notable Wu generals such as Lü Dai, Zhou Fang and Zhongli Mu for their success in helping Sun Quan pacify the restive Shanyue tribes in the Jiangdong territories. He commented on Quan Cong as follows: "Quan Cong was a talented individual of his time. He was one of the most favoured and one of those who held the most prestigious positions (among Sun Quan's subjects). However, his failure to rein in his villainous sons (Note: Referring to his sons Quan Jì and Quan Yì. Quan Jì played an active role as a supporter of Sun Ba in the succession struggle by making political attacks on Sun He's supporters. Quan Yì betrayed Wu and defected to Wei while leading Wu forces to support Zhuge Dan in his rebellion against Wei.) cost him his good reputation.

== See also ==
- Lists of people of the Three Kingdoms
