= Empress Dayi =

Concubine of Emperor Sun Quan

Lady Wang 王夫人
- Born: Unknown
- Died: Unknown
- Spouse: Sun Quan
- Issue: Sun He
Posthumous name
- Empress Dayi (大懿皇后)
- Father: Wang Lujiu

Empress Dayi, known during her life as Lady Wang, was a concubine of Sun Quan, the founding emperor of the state of Eastern Wu and mother of heir Sun He during the Three Kingdoms period of China. She would lose favor due to the slanders of another and died.

== Life ==
Lady Wang was from Langye (琅邪; present-day Linyi, Shandong), and was referred to as Lady Wang of Langye to distinguish her from Lady Wang of Nanyang (posthumously known as Empress Jinghuai, another concubine of Sun Quan who shared the same surname). Lady Wang was the daughter of Wang Lujiu, and she is reported as having three younger brothers. She entered Sun Quan's harem during the Huangwu period (222–229), presumably before 224 when she gave birth to Sun He, and she was generally Sun Quan's second-favourite after Lady Bu. When Crown Prince Sun Deng died in 241, Sun He became heir apparent and Sun Quan made overtures to make Lady Wang his empress with other favored ladies like Lady Wang of Nanyang were removed from the palace. However, Sun Quan's daughter by Lady Bu, Sun Luban was a supporter of rival candidate Sun Ba while she and Lady Wang had fallen out, slandering her little by little. When Sun Quan was bedridden and Sun He went to offer sacrifices at Sun Ce's temple, Sun Luban acted against both He and Lady Wang, saying Sun He had gone to conspire with his in-laws including Zhang Xiu and that Lady Wang rejoiced when she saw Sun Quan so unwell. Sun Quan was enraged on hearing this and Lady Wang supposedly died of anxiety.

== Family and relatives ==
Sun He's position was weakened and he was exiled during the political scandal of his succession struggle with Sun Ba in 250; he was forced to commit suicide in late 253 during Sun Liang's reign. He was survived by his own son, Sun Hao, who became emperor in 264, at which point Lady Wang was posthumously titled Empress Dayi (大懿皇后 Great Exemplary Empress), and her three younger brothers were awarded marquisates.
