= Quan Huijie =

Empress of Eastern Wu state (born 244)

Quan Huijie 全惠解

Empress consort of Eastern Wu
- Tenure: 16 February 253 – November 258
- Predecessor: Empress Pan
- Successor: Empress Jing
- Born: 244; Hangzhou, Zhejiang
- Died: c.early 300s
- Spouse: Sun Liang
- Father: Quan Shang

Empress Quan (244 (Note: The Yong'an Biji (庸庵笔记) mentioned that Quan Huijie was 10 years old (by East Asian age reckoning) when she became empress in Feb 253. Her year of birth should therefore be 244. However, the Biji also indicated that Lady Quan was 18 (by East Asian reckoning) when Sun Liang died (in 260).) – c.early 300s), also known as Quan Huijie, was an empress of the state of Eastern Wu during the Three Kingdoms period of China. She was married to Sun Liang, the second emperor of Wu.

== Life ==
Lady Quan was a daughter of Quan Shang (全尚). Her mother was a daughter of Sun Gong, the grandson of Sun Jing. Her relative Quan Cong married Sun Luban, a daughter of Wu's founding emperor Sun Quan. When she was young, she looked pretty and was favoured by Sun Luban. Every time Sun Luban entered the palace, she took Lady Quan to visit her father. When a succession struggle between Sun Quan's sons Sun He and Sun Ba was ongoing, Sun Luban, who had a feud with Sun He's mother, urged her father to arrange a marriage between Lady Quan and Sun Liang (Note: another of Sun Quan's sons, born to Lady Pan) because Sun Liang and his mother were becoming increasingly favoured by Sun Quan. Around 250, the succession struggle between Sun He and Sun Ba concluded when Sun Quan deposed Sun He from his position as crown prince and forced Sun Ba to commit suicide. Sun Liang was designated as the new heir apparent to the Wu throne.

In May 252, Sun Liang ascended the throne upon the death of his father. On 16 February 253, he instated Lady Quan as the empress. Following that, Empress Quan's family and relatives rose to power as six members of the Quan clan (including Quan Shang) were enfeoffed as marquises and assumed high offices in the Wu government and military forces. This was regarded as a phenomenon because since the founding of Wu in 229, there had never been a case of consort kin (Note: relatives of the emperor's wife and concubines) playing prominent roles in the Wu political scene. In 257, when Zhuge Dan (Note: a general from Wu's rival state Cao Wei) started a rebellion in Wei-controlled Shouchun (壽春; around present-day Shou County, Anhui), he requested help from Wu so Sun Liang ordered the Quans to lead troops to Shouchun to assist Zhuge Dan. However, the rebellion was suppressed by Wei forces and Zhuge Dan was killed, while four of the Quans surrendered and defected to Wei. Thereafter, the Quans' influence in Wu weakened drastically.

In November 258, Sun Liang was deposed from the throne by Sun Chen, a distant relative of the Wu imperial family who rose to power in the 250s and became the regent of Wu. Sun Liang became known as the "Prince of Kuaiji" after his dethronement while Empress Quan also lost her place as the empress. In 260, Sun Liang's elder half-brother and successor, Sun Xiu (Note: Sun Xiu eliminated Sun Chen after ascending the throne in 258.) further demoted Sun Liang to "Marquis of Houguan" and sent Sun Liang to his marquisate in Houguan County (Note: around present-day Fuzhou, Fujian). Lady Quan accompanied Sun Liang to Houguan County and settled there. She returned to the Wu capital Jianye (建業; present-day Nanjing, Jiangsu) after Wu was vanquished in 280 by forces of the Jin dynasty. (Note: successor state of Cao Wei; the regent Sima Yan usurped the throne from Cao Huan in February 266.) She died sometime in the Yongning era (301–303) of the reign of Emperor Hui of Jin.

== See also ==
- Eastern Wu family trees#Sun Liang
- Lists of people of the Three Kingdoms

== Notes ==
Chinese royalty
Preceded by Empress Pan	Empress of Eastern Wu; 253–258	Succeeded by Empress Zhu
