= Sun Luban =

3rd-century Eastern Wu imperial princess

Sun Luban 孫魯班
- Princess Quan (全公主)
- Born: Unknown (Note: While Lady Sun's birth year is not recorded, her mother joined Sun Quan's harem after 199 (Sun Ce's invasion of Lujiang). In addition, her marriage to Quan Cong was her second one. Thus, her birth year should be between 199 and 215.)
- Died: Unknown
- Spouse: Zhou Xun; Quan Cong, Marquis of Qiantang (m. 229)
- Issue: Quan Yì; Quan Wu
Names
- Family name: Sun (孫); Given name: Luban (魯班); Courtesy name: Dahu (大虎)
- House: House of Sun
- Father: Sun Quan
- Mother: Bu Lianshi

Sun Luban (fl. 229–258), courtesy name Dahu, was an imperial princess of the state of Eastern Wu during the Three Kingdoms period of China. She was the elder daughter of Sun Quan, the founding emperor of Wu, and his concubine Bu Lianshi. She is also a grand princess (長公主) a title given to the emperor's favorite daughter (or sister), and was also Princess Quan (全公主/全主) because of her marriage to Quan Cong.

== Early life and marriages ==
Sun Luban was the elder daughter of Sun Quan, the founding emperor of Eastern Wu, and his concubine Bu Lianshi. She had a younger sister, Sun Luyu. The sisters' courtesy names, Dahu (大虎) and Xiaohu (小虎), respectively mean "big tiger" and "small tiger". Sun Luban initially married Zhou Xun (周循), Zhou Yu's son, but Zhou Xun died early. In 229, she married again, this time to Quan Cong, a general serving under her father. Sun Luban had two sons with Quan Cong: Quan Yì (全懌) (Note: Not to be confused with his similarly named relatives Quan Yī (全禕) and Quan Yí (全儀).) and Quan Wu (全吳).

== Life during Sun Quan's reign ==
Sun Luban bore a grudge against Lady Wang, one of her father's concubines. She also disliked her half-brother, Sun He, who was born to Lady Wang. In 242, after Sun Quan designated Sun He as Crown Prince, he wanted to make Lady Wang the Empress. However, Sun Luban strongly objected and repeatedly spoke ill of Lady Wang in front of her father and managed to persuade him to drop the idea.

As Sun Luban was worried that Sun He would take revenge against her after he became emperor, she frequently spoke ill of him in front of their father in the hope that Sun He would be deposed. On one occasion, Sun Quan could not attend a ceremony at the imperial ancestral temple because he was sick, so he ordered Sun He to take his place. Zhang Xiu, an uncle of Sun He's wife Crown Princess Zhang (張太子妃), lived near the imperial ancestral temple so he invited Sun He to stay at his residence during that period. Sun Luban sent her servants to spy on Sun He and reported to her father that Sun He was not in the imperial ancestral temple and was instead staying with his in-laws and plotting something. She also used the opportunity to further speak ill of Sun He's mother, Lady Wang, by telling Sun Quan that Lady Wang expressed glee when she heard that he was sick. Sun Quan believed his daughter and became furious with Lady Wang. Lady Wang later died in distress, while Sun He lost favour with his father.

Sometime in the 240s, a power struggle broke out between Sun He and his fourth brother, Sun Ba, who wanted to seize the position of Crown Prince from him. The power struggle had a polarising effect on Sun Quan's subjects; two opposing factions, each supporting either Sun He or Sun Ba, emerged from among them. During this time, Sun Luban's husband, Quan Cong, supported Sun Ba, but died in 249 before the power struggle ended. In 250, the power struggle came to an end when Sun Quan forced Sun Ba to commit suicide and deposed Sun He from his position as Crown Prince. Many of the officials involved in the power struggle were executed, exiled or removed from office.

Earlier on, Sun Luban noticed that her father increasingly favoured his youngest son, Sun Liang, and wanted to replace Sun He with Sun Liang as Crown Prince. In order to curry favor with the youngest brother and stepmother Pan Shu，she advised her father to arrange a marriage between Sun Liang and Quan Huijie, the daughter of Quan Shang (全尚), a younger relative of her husband Quan Cong. Sun Quan heeded his daughter's advice and arranged for Sun Liang to marry Quan Huijie. In 250, after deposing Sun He, Sun Quan made Sun Liang the new Crown Prince, while Quan Huijie became Crown Princess.

== Life during Sun Jun's regency ==
In 252, Sun Liang became the second emperor of Eastern Wu following the death of his father. As Sun Liang was only nine years old then, Zhuge Ke served as regent and ruled on his behalf. In 253, Sun Jun staged a coup d'état against Zhuge Ke and killed him, and then became the new regent. Sun Jun had a secret affair with Sun Luban; the affair probably started after her husband Quan Cong died in 249. Making use of her special relationship with Sun Jun, Sun Luban instigated him to help her get rid of her half-brother Sun He, the former Crown Prince. In 253, Sun Jun had Sun He relocated to Xindu Commandery (新都郡; around present-day Yi County, Anhui) and then sent an emissary to force him to commit suicide.

Earlier on during her father's reign, when Sun Luban took Sun Ba's side in the succession struggle against Sun He, she sought support from her younger sister, Sun Luyu. She became estranged from her sister after the latter refused to support her. In 255, Sun Yi (孫儀) and others plotted to overthrow Sun Jun from his position as regent, but were discovered and executed before they could carry out their plan. Sun Luban seized the opportunity to falsely accuse Sun Luyu of being involved in the plot, and instigated Sun Jun to have her executed as well.

== Life during Sun Chen's regency ==
After Sun Jun died in 256, his cousin Sun Chen succeeded him as the regent for the Wu emperor Sun Liang. Sometime between 256 and 258, Sun Liang suspected that Sun Luban had something to do with Sun Luyu's death, so he summoned his half-sister and questioned her. A fearful Sun Luban lied to him, "I really don't know. I heard it from Zhu Ju's sons, Zhu Xiong (朱熊) and Zhu Sun (朱損)." Sun Liang thought that Zhu Xiong and Zhu Sun betrayed Sun Luyu to Sun Jun – especially since Zhu Sun married Sun Jun's younger sister – so he ordered Ding Feng to execute Zhu Xiong and Zhu Sun.

Sun Liang also became increasingly wary of Sun Chen, who seemed likely to usurp the throne from him, so in 258 he plotted with Sun Luban, Quan Shang (全尚) and Liu Cheng (劉承) to eliminate Sun Chen. As one of Sun Liang's concubines was a cousin of Sun Chen, she overheard the plot and warned Sun Chen about it. Sun Chen quickly took action to preempt them: he sent his men to capture Quan Shang, sent his brother Sun En (孫恩) to kill Liu Cheng, and then led his soldiers to surround the palace. Later, he removed Sun Liang from the throne and replaced him with Sun Xiu, Sun Quan's sixth son. He also had Sun Luban exiled to Yuzhang Commandery (豫章郡; around present-day Nanchang, Jiangxi). It is not known what happened to Sun Luban after that.

== See also ==
- Lists of people of the Three Kingdoms
- Eastern Wu family trees#Sun Quan
