= Sun Jun (Eastern Wu) =

Eastern Wu state general and regent (219-256)

- 孫峻

Imperial Chancellor (丞相)
- In office November or December 253 – 19 October 256
- Monarch: Sun Liang
- Preceded by: Zhu Ju
- Succeeded by: Sun Chen

General-in-Chief (大將軍)
- In office November or December 253 – 19 October 256
- Monarch: Sun Liang
- Preceded by: Zhuge Ke
- Succeeded by: Sun Chen

General of the Military Guards (武衛將軍)
- In office 252 – November or December 253
- Monarch: Sun Quan / Sun Liang

Personal details
- Born: 219
- Died: 19 October 256 (aged 37) (Note: Sun Liang's biography in the Sanguozhi recorded that Sun Jun died on the dinghai day of the 9th month of the 1st year of the Taiping era of Sun Liang's reign. This date corresponds to 19 October 256 in the Gregorian calendar.)
- Relations: See Eastern Wu family trees
- Parent: Sun Gong (father)
- Occupation: Military general, regent
- Courtesy name: Ziyuan (子遠)
- Peerage: Marquis of Fuchun (富春侯)

Sun Jun (219 – 19 October 256), courtesy name Ziyuan, was the sixth Imperial Chancellor of the state of Eastern Wu during the Three Kingdoms period of China. Known to be brave and skilled in some warrior arts, he served under his kinsman and founding Wu emperor Sun Quan and was given the important role to help protect the young second Wu emperor, Sun Liang. Sun Jun overthrew and personally slew the regent Zhuge Ke, but took power for himself and became a regent. His own regency would be destabilized by plotting due to his severity and lechery; he would kill (and sleep with) members of the imperial Sun clan.

== Early life ==
Sun Jun was a great-grandson of Sun Jing, an uncle of Wu's founding emperor Sun Quan; his father was Sun Gong (孙恭), who became Cavalier Attendant-Cadet, and his grandfather was Sun Gao (孙暠). Sun Gao had, on Quan's elder brother Sun Ce's death, made an abortive claim to the succession as an elder candidate, ending his career, but this doesn't seem to have impacted Sun Jun's prospects. As a youth, he gained a reputation as a rider and an archer, and for being brave and decisive.

Late in Sun Quan's reign, Sun Jun became a trusted aide as the infighting between the crown prince Sun He and his younger brother Sun Ba split the court. Sun Quan is said to have told Sun Jun of his worries, being concerned that the divisions that had undermined the regime of Yuan Shao would repeat here. Thus, Sun Quan decided that neither prince should succeed him. He was said to have been, in conjunction with Sun Quan's daughter Sun Luban, involved in falsely accusing the crown prince Sun He, leading to Sun He's deposal in 250. At his and Sun Luban's recommendation, Sun Quan created his youngest son Sun Liang as his successor. When Sun Quan fell mortally ill in 251, he considered recalling Sun He to court but Sun Jun was a leading voice to oppose it and Sun Quan decided against his initial plan. When Sun Quan considered who might be regent to his young successor, Sun Jun advocated for Zhuge Ke as the most talented man in court and managed to overcome Sun Quan's concerns about Zhuge Ke's headstrong personality. In 252, Sun Jun was one of the figures summoned to Sun Quan's deathbed, charged with maintaining the state, given charge of the guard and ennobled.

== Reign of Sun Liang ==
The powerful official Sun Hong (孫弘; no relation to the imperial Sun clan) was one of the figures charged by the dying Sun Quan to protect the state. He wanted to cover up Sun Quan's death and destroy Zhuge Ke as the two had been unfriendly and now Zhuge Ke was set to control the empire. Sun Jun revealed the news to Zhuge Ke, who then executed Sun Hong. However, Zhuge Ke seems to have thought little of Sun Jun and little is recorded of Sun Jun till his role in the fall of Zhuge Ke.

In 253, after Zhuge Ke had suffered a major military defeat to Wu's rival state, Cao Wei, and his refusal to admit fault but instead trying to reassert control, led to unhappiness, while the southern families resented having a northern man in charge. Due to Zhuge Ke's unpopularity and his actions, Sun Jun persuaded the young emperor that Zhuge Ke was committing treason, so in the winter they acted. Sun Jun invited Zhuge Ke to a banquet court and sent wine the night before, on the morning he had troops hidden ready for the ambush. When Zhuge Ke dallied at the gates, Sun Jun personally went to greet him and offered to go alone to meet the Emperor, which reassured Zhuge Ke. However, Zhuge Ke was suspicious as rumours of the plot had leaked, and he refused to drink the liquor set out for him. Sun Jun reassured him by saying that Zhuge Ke, given his recent health, could drink Ke's own medicated wine. The Wu Li by Wu historian Hu Chong, backed by 4th century commentator Sun Sheng, provided an alternative version of events: that Zhuge Ke believed there was a plot, but dismissed Sun Jun and allies as a threat, his only worry being poison.

After several rounds of wine, Sun Liang retired with Sun Jun escorting him and then Sun Jun changed out of long robes into a more practical shorter clothing and came back with an imperial order for Zhuge Ke's arrest. The regent was surprised so Sun Jun attacked Zhuge Ke before he could draw his sword. Zhang Yue tried to intervene and injured Sun Jun's hand, but Sun Jun was able to cut off Zhang Yue's arm. By the time the guards arrived, Zhuge Ke was dead. Sun Jun then ordered them to stand down and returned to drinking. The Wu Lu by contemporary Zhang Bo claimed that Sun Liang was still in the room and protested Sun Jun acting against Zhuge Ke but this contradicts the Sanguozhi and the Wu Li, so the Wu Lu account was dismissed by Pei Songzhi.

Sun Jun moved quickly against Zhuge Ke's family, sending cavalry officer Liu Cheng in pursuit as some fled, dispatched generals after Ke's brother Rong who committed suicide. Ultimately, Zhuge Ke's family was destroyed. Sun Jun initially wrapped Ke's body in rush matting, with wicker used as splints, then hastily buried but he and Sun Liang did allow Zang Jun and other former officers of Zhuge Ke to collect his body and give it a proper burial.

== Sun Jun as regent ==
It was initially expected that Zhuge Ke's authority would be divided between Sun Jun and the respected minister Teng Yin but someone proposed power should be kept within the imperial clan and Teng Yin commanded too much popular support. Sun Jun, to the disappointment of many, took on Zhuge Ke's role as chief minister by becoming Chancellor and General-in-chief with control of the military while failing to appoint a head of the Censorate that might keep him in check. Teng Yin used his familial connections to Zhuge Ke as a reason to offer his resignation, but Sun Jun rejected this argument, instead upgrading Teng Yin's noble title. Although the two were frequently at odds, in public, as the two most senior officials, they gave an outward appearance of harmony. As there were rumors Zhuge Ke wished to recall Sun He to court and possibly to even enthrone him, with the former Crown Prince married to a relative of Zhuge Ke, Sun Jun stripped Sun He of his nobility and ordered him to commit suicide.

Sun Jun lacked reputation before becoming chief minister of Wu and his actions on taking power made it worse. He was severe in his punishments, arrogant, and he was debauched with accusations he slept with the palace ladies, including with a kinswoman of the imperial clan, the married Princess Sun Luban. As a result, he gained enmity of many, including terrified members of the imperial family, and there were several conspiracies against his life during his regency, including one in 254 led by Sun Ying (孫英), the Marquis of Wu, the son of Sun Quan's eldest son Sun Deng, inspired by either usurpation of power or the death of Sun He. The plots against Sun Jun are estimated by the historian Rafe De Crespigny to have been almost annual.

On 5 February 255, Wei generals Wen Qin and Guanqiu Jian launched a revolt against the controller Sima Shi. Sun Jun sought to target Shouchun, claiming to lead 100,000 troops, but had only reached Dongxing (in present-day Chaohu, Anhui) when word reached the Wu army of the failure of the rebellion on March 11, with Guanqiu Jian soon killed. Sun Jun took in the rebels with ten thousand troops joining him then proceeded to Shouchun, defeating Wei general Cao Zhen (曹珍) at Gaoting. Meanwhile Sima Shi died, and was replaced as regent by his younger brother Sima Zhao. Despite the transfer of power, the Wei general Zhuge Dan arrived before Sun Jun and was prepared when Jun arrived on 5 April, so Sun Jun retreated. However Zhuge Dan sent Jiang Ban to pursue and the Wu forces suffered defeat including the death of the ailing senior commander Liu Zan as well as generals Sun Leng and Jiang Xu. A separate attack by Zhu Yi on Anfeng also failed. In the autumn of that year, general Sun Yi (孫儀) along with Zhang Yi (張怡) and Lin Xun (林恂) sought to use the arrival of an envoy from their ally Shu Han to assassinate Sun Jun, but the plot leaked. Several tens of people were ordered to commit suicide and Sun Luban used the opportunity to falsely accuse her sister Sun Luyu who was then killed.

In a rare example of domestic policy from Sun Jun's regency, Sun Jun sought to build walls around Guangling. The court feared it would be too expensive and never be finished, but only Teng Yin dared protest. The work was started but with Jun soon to die, it would never be completed.

== Death and legacy ==
In 256, at the urging of Wen Qin, (Note: Wen had surrendered to Wu after the failure of his revolt; the official Wei history Weishu claimed only Sun Jun could tolerate and treated Wen generously.) Sun Jun ordered a major attack against Wei, but would not lead it himself. Wen Qin, Lü Ju (呂據), Liu Zuan (劉纂), Zhu Yi (朱異) and Tang Zi were to advance up the Huai and Si rivers to attack Qing and Xu provinces. Sun Jun and Teng Yin went to Lü Ju's camp at Shitou with a large attendance, but Sun Jun was troubled by seeing how well Lü Ju's soldiers were, so he claimed illness and withdrew. Plagued by dreams of Zhuge Ke striking him, Sun Jun fell mortally ill. He transferred his powers to his cousin Sun Chen and then died at the age of only 38 sui. Sun Chen succeeded him, recalling the armies; Lü Ju also led an unsuccessful revolt.

In 258, after Sun Chen had deposed Sun Liang and had in turn been executed by the succeeding emperor Sun Xiu, Sun Jun's casket was disinterred and reduced in size, as a sign of imperial disapproval; both Sun Jun and Sun Chen were posthumously banished from the royal family and renamed Gu Jun (故峻) and Gu Chen (故綝) respectively. While there was no recorded sons of Sun Jun, records indicated some female relatives: his elder sister was married to Quan Shang of the powerful Quan clan and a younger sister was married to Zhu Sun, son of Zhu Ju.

Sun Jun appears in the 14th century Luo Guanzhong novel Romance of the Three Kingdoms in chapters 108 and 110 before dying off-page in chapter 111. Beloved by Sun Quan, he acts against Zhuge Ke due to being removed from command and on the urging of Teng Yin who is the more active plotter.

== See also ==
- Eastern Wu family trees#Sun Hao (Sun Jing's son)
- Lists of people of the Three Kingdoms
