= Linfen County =

County in Shanxi, China

- County
- Interactive map of Linfen County
- Coordinates: 36°00′N 111°28′E
- Country: China
- Province: Shanxi
- Prefecture-level city: Linfen

Population
  - Total: 680,000
- Time zone: UTC+8 (China Standard Time)

Linfen County is a small Chinese county in Shanxi province. Its main city is Linfen city, previously called Pingyang, population 680,000. Hukou falls on the Yellow River is in this county. Coordinates are 35º23’ to 36º37’, eastern longitude from 110º22’ to 112º34. Shanxi Teachers' University is in Linfen.
