= Zhu Ju =

Eastern Wu state official and general (194-250)

- 朱據

Imperial Chancellor (丞相)
- In office 8 May 249 – 250
- Monarch: Sun Quan
- Preceded by: Bu Zhi
- Succeeded by: Sun Jun

General of Agile Cavalry (驃騎將軍)
- In office 246 – 8 May 249
- Monarch: Sun Quan

General of the Left (左將軍)
- In office 229 – 246
- Monarch: Sun Quan

Personal details
- Born: 194 (Note: Vol.75 of Zizhi Tongjian recorded that Zhu Ju died in the autumn (7th to 9th month) of 250; the period corresponds to 15 Aug to 11 Nov 250 in the Julian calendar. Zhu Ju's biography in the Sanguozhi recorded that he was 57 (by East Asian age reckoning) when he died. By calculation, Zhu Ju's year of birth should be 194.) Suzhou, Jiangsu
- Died: 250 (aged 56)
- Spouse: Sun Luyu (m. 229)
- Children: Zhu Xiong; Zhu Sun; Empress Jing
- Occupation: Military general, politician
- Courtesy name: Zifan (子範)
- Peerage: Marquis of Yunyang (雲陽侯)

Zhu Ju (194–250), courtesy name Zifan, was the fifth Imperial Chancellor of the state of Eastern Wu from 249 to 250 during the Three Kingdoms period of China. He was also a son-in-law of Wu's founding emperor Sun Quan.

== Life ==
Zhu Ju was from Wu County, Wu Commandery, which is in present-day Suzhou, Jiangsu. The Zhu clan, which he was from, was one of the four most influential clans in Wu Commandery at the time. (Note: The four great clans of Wu Commandery were the Gu (顧), Lu (陸), Zhu (朱) and Zhang (張) clans. Some notable members from each clan were: Gu Yong, Gu Shao and Gu Tan of the Gu clan; Lu Xun, Lu Ji and Lu Kai of the Lu clan; Zhu Huan and Zhu Ju of the Zhu clan; and Zhang Wen of the Zhang clan.) He was described as good-looking, physically strong, and adept in debating. In the early 220s, he was recruited by Sun Quan, the King of Wu, to serve as an Attendant of Miscellaneous Affairs (五官郎中) and Imperial Clerk (侍御史). Around the time, Ji Yan, a Master of Writing in the Selection Bureau (選曹尚書), wanted to dismiss several officials because he perceived them to be corrupt and incompetent. However, Zhu Ju disagreed with Ji Yan because he was worried that the abrupt dismissal of so many officials would lead to instability in the Wu government. He urged Ji Yan to not penalise those officials for their transgressions, and instead allow them to remain in office to make amends for their mistakes. He also suggested that Ji Yan praise the honest and hardworking officials and give encouragement to the underperforming ones. Ji Yan refused to listen to Zhu Ju and met his downfall later. (Note: See Ji Yan's article for more details on this incident.)

When Sun Quan considered the calibre of his subjects, he often experienced feelings of frustration and regret because he missed Lü Meng (died in 220) and Zhang Wen (deposed in 224) and could not find anyone to succeed them. Later, he felt that Zhu Ju was proficient in handling both civil and military affairs, and had the potential to inherit the legacies of Lü Meng and Zhang Wen. As such, he appointed Zhu Ju as Colonel Who Establishes Righteousness (建義校尉) and ordered him to garrison at Hushu (湖孰; in present-day Jiangning District, Nanjing, Jiangsu).

In 229, after Sun Quan declared himself emperor and established the state of Eastern Wu with its capital in Jianye (in present-day Nanjing, Jiangsu), he arranged for Zhu Ju to marry his daughter Sun Luyu. Zhu Ju was also promoted to General of the Left (左將軍) and enfeoffed as the Marquis of Yunyang (雲陽侯).

During the Jiahe era (232–238) in Sun Quan's reign, large copper coins were manufactured in Wu, with each large coin equivalent in value to 500 small coins. Zhu Ju's army was to receive a salary of 30,000 strings of coins, but the coppersmith Wang Sui (王遂) secretly took some of the coins for himself. Zhu Ju's army was paid less than expected. Lü Yi, the supervisor of the audit bureau, suspected Zhu Ju of embezzling military funds, so he had the finance officer in Zhu's army arrested and interrogated. The officer died under torture during the interrogation. Zhu Ju felt that the officer died a wrongful death so he had the officer properly buried. Lü Yi wrote to Sun Quan and claimed that Zhu Ju conspired with the finance officer to embezzle military funds and the fact that Zhu had the officer properly buried served as evidence of the conspiracy. When Zhu Ju was repeatedly summoned to meet Sun Quan for questioning, he was unable to explain himself so he laid down on a straw mat to await his fate. Some months later, another inspector Liu Zhu (劉助) discovered the truth and reported that the coppersmith Wang Sui was actually the culprit, thereby clearing Zhu Ju's name. Sun Quan was very moved when he learnt the truth and he said, "Even Zhu Ju fell victim to injustice, much less other officials and the people." He then punished Lü Yi and rewarded Liu Zhu with a million coins.

In 246, Zhu Ju was promoted to General of Agile Cavalry (驃騎將軍). On 8 May 249, he was appointed as the Imperial Chancellor (丞相). Around the time, there was a rivalry between two of Sun Quan's sons – Sun He, the Crown Prince, and Sun Ba, the Prince of Lu – over the succession to their father's throne. Zhu Ju was very open and vocal in pledging his support to Sun He, whom he deemed the legitimate heir apparent. In 250, Sun Quan forced Sun Ba to commit suicide and put Sun He under house arrest with the intention of deposing him later. When Zhu Ju, Qu Huang (屈晃) and others heard about it, they covered their heads in mud, tied themselves up, and came to beg Sun Quan to release Sun He. When Sun Quan saw them, he felt angry and scolded them for creating a disturbance. After Zhu Ju and Qu Huang repeatedly pressured Sun Quan to spare Sun He, the emperor got fed up with them and ordered them to be flogged 100 times. Qu Huang was later removed from office and sent back to his hometown, while Zhu Ju was demoted to the position of an assistant official in Xindu Commandery (新都郡; around present-day Chun'an County, Zhejiang). While Zhu Ju was en route to Xindu, Sun Hong (孫弘), a supporter of Sun Ba, spoke ill of Zhu Ju in front of Sun Quan. At the time, as Sun Quan was sick, Sun Hong took advantage of the situation to forge an imperial decree in Sun Quan's name ordering Zhu Ju to commit suicide. Zhu Ju thought that the decree was genuine so he killed himself as ordered. He was 57 (by East Asian age reckoning) when he died.

== Family ==
Zhu Ju married Sun Quan's daughter Sun Luyu. She remarried Liu Zuan (劉纂) after Zhu Ju's death.

Zhu Ju had two sons, Zhu Xiong (朱熊) and Zhu Sun (朱損), who were commissioned as military officers during the reign of Sun Liang. Sun Luban (Sun Luyu's sister) falsely accused them of causing Sun Luyu's death, which led to Sun Liang ordering Ding Feng to execute them. Zhu Sun married a younger sister of Sun Jun (Sun Chen's cousin).

During the reign of Sun Xiu, Zhu Ju was posthumously honoured for his contributions to Wu. Zhu Ju and Sun Luyu's daughter, Empress Zhu, married Sun Xiu. Besides, Zhu Ju's grandson Zhu Xuan (朱宣; Zhu Xiong's son) inherited his grandfather's title "Marquis of Yunyang" and married a princess. He was appointed as General of Agile Cavalry (驃騎將軍) during the reign of Sun Hao.

== Appraisal ==
Zhu Ju was known for being polite and humble. He was also very generous with his wealth and used it to help the needy, to the point where he was often short of money even though he received a high salary. Chen Shou, who wrote Zhu Ju's biography in the Sanguozhi, appraised Zhu and Wu Can as follows, "Wu Can and Zhu Ju met with unlucky fates and died in the name of righteousness. What a pity!"

== See also ==
- Lists of people of the Three Kingdoms
- Eastern Wu family trees
