= Zhang Xiu (Eastern Wu) =

Eastern Wu state general (205-245)

- 張休

General Who Spreads Martial Might (揚武將軍)
- In office 241 – 245
- Monarch: Sun Quan

Personal details
- Born: c. 205
- Died: c. 245 (aged 40); Jiao Province
- Relations: Zhang Cheng (brother)
- Parent: Zhang Zhao (father)
- Occupation: General
- Courtesy name: Shusi (叔嗣)
- Peerage: Marquis of Lou (婁侯)

Zhang Xiu (c. 205–245), courtesy name Shusi, was a military general of the state of Eastern Wu during the Three Kingdoms period of China.

== Life ==
Zhang Xiu was the younger son of Zhang Zhao, a statesman who served under Sun Quan, the founding emperor of Eastern Wu. After his father died, he inherited his father's peerage "Marquis of Lou" (婁侯) because his elder brother, Zhang Cheng, already had a peerage of his own.

When Zhang Xiu reached adulthood at around the age of 19, he, along with Zhuge Ke, Gu Tan and Chen Biao, were appointed as attendants of Sun Deng, the eldest son and heir apparent of Sun Quan. They imparted their knowledge of the Book of Han to Sun Deng. As Zhang Xiu was not only precise and orderly in his teaching, but also casual and friendly, Sun Deng regarded him as a close friend and often invited him to attend feasts.

Zhang Xiu was later reassigned to be a Right Assistant Commandant (右弼都尉). Sun Quan frequently went on hunting excursions and returned late in the evening, so Zhang Xiu wrote a memorial to the emperor, urging him to have better time management. Sun Quan heeded Zhang Xiu's advice and even showed the article to Zhang Zhao. After Sun Deng died in 241, Zhang Xiu became a Palace Attendant (侍中) and was commissioned as a Commander of the Feathered Forest Corps of the Imperial Guards (羽林都督) and was in charge of inspecting military affairs. He was later promoted to General Who Spreads Martial Might (揚武將軍).

In the 240s, a power struggle broke out between two of Sun Quan's sons — Sun He, the Crown Prince; Sun Ba, the Prince of Lu. Zhang Xiu was a supporter of Sun He. In 241, after Zhang Xiu returned from a battle against Wu's rival state, Cao Wei, at Quebei (芍陂; south of present-day Shou County, Anhui), the Wu general Quan Cong and his son Quan Ji (全寄) accused Zhang Xiu, Gu Tan and Gu Cheng of conspiring with an officer Chen Xun (陳恂) to make a false report about their achievements in the battle. In 245, Zhang Xiu and the Gus were exiled to Jiao Province. As Zhang Xiu previously had a feud with Sun Hong (孫弘), the Director of the Imperial Secretariat, the latter used the opportunity to make further complaints against Zhang Xiu, which resulted in Zhang Xiu being ordered to commit suicide by Sun Quan. Zhang Xiu was 40 years old when he died.

== See also ==
- Lists of people of the Three Kingdoms
