= Sun He =

Eastern Wu Prince of Nanyang (224–253)

Sun He 孫和

Prince of Nanyang (南陽王)
- Tenure: January or February 252 – 253

Crown Prince of Eastern Wu
- Tenure: February or March 242 – September or October 250
- Predecessor: Sun Deng
- Successor: Sun Liang
- Born: 224
- Died: late 253 (aged 29); Yi County, Anhui, Eastern Wu
- Spouse: Consort Zhang; Lady He
- Issue: Sun Jun; Sun Hao; Sun De; Sun Qian; Lu Jing's wife
Names
- Family name: Sun (孫); Given name: He (和); Courtesy name: Zixiao (子孝)
Posthumous name
- Emperor Zhaoxian (昭獻皇帝) (initial); Emperor Wen (文皇帝) (revised)
- House: House of Sun
- Father: Sun Quan
- Mother: Empress Dayi

Sun He (224 – c.December 253 (Note: Sun Liang's biography in the Sanguozhi recorded that Zhuge Ke died in the 10th month of the 2nd year of the Jian'xing era of Sun Liang's reign. This month corresponds to 8 November to 7 December 253 in the Gregorian calendar. In Sun He's biography, it was recorded that he died soon after Zhuge Ke's death.)), courtesy name Zixiao, was an imperial prince of the Eastern Wu dynasty during the Three Kingdoms period of China. He was the third son of Sun Quan, the founding emperor. In 242, he became the crown prince after the death of his half-brother Sun Deng, the eldest son and first heir apparent of Sun Quan. In the 240s, a power struggle broke out between Sun He and his fourth brother, Sun Ba, over the succession to their father's throne. The conflict ended in 250 when Sun Quan forced Sun Ba to commit suicide, deposed Sun He and replaced him with Sun Liang. In 253, during Sun Liang's reign, the regent Sun Jun reduced Sun He to commoner status and forced him to commit suicide. In 264, one of Sun He's sons, Sun Hao, became the fourth emperor of Eastern Wu. After his coronation, Sun Hao posthumously promoted his father to imperial status with the posthumous name Emperor Zhaoxian, later changed to Emperor Wen.

== Early life ==
Sun He was born as the third son of Sun Quan, a warlord of the late Eastern Han dynasty who became the founding emperor of the Eastern Wu state in the Three Kingdoms period; he had two elder brothers, Sun Deng and Sun Lü. His mother was Lady Wang (王夫人), one of Sun Quan's concubines; she was posthumously honoured as "Empress Dayi" (大懿皇后) in 264. As Lady Wang was Sun Quan's favourite consort at the time, Sun He also became his father's favourite son. In 237, when Sun He was only 13 years old, Sun Quan appointed some officials to serve as Sun He's personal staff and ordered Kan Ze, the Prefect of the Palace Writers, to be Sun He's personal tutor. Sun He, then a young teenager, was known for being studious and respectful. The officials who met him all praised him.

In 241, Sun Quan's eldest son and heir apparent Sun Deng, died of illness. One year later, in February or March 242, Sun Quan designated an 18-year-old Sun He, his eldest surviving son, (Note: Sun Quan's second son, Sun Lü, died even earlier in 232, so Sun He, as Sun Quan's third son, became the eldest among Sun Quan's sons after Sun Deng's death in 241.) as the new Crown Prince to replace Sun Deng. At the same time, Sun Quan also promoted Kan Ze to Crown Prince's Grand Tutor (太子太傅), appointed Xue Zong as the Crown Prince's Junior Tutor (太子少傅), and ordered Cai Ying (蔡穎), Zhang Chun (張純), Feng Fu (封俌), Yan Wei (嚴維) and others to serve as the Crown Prince's attendants and personal staff.

== As crown prince ==
As Sun He was intelligent, Sun Quan favoured him and often kept him by his side. Sun Quan also treated Sun He exceptionally well; he gave Sun He new clothes, ornaments, toys and other gifts, but did not do the same for his other sons. Sun Quan's subjects also highly regarded Sun He because he was not only bright, perceptive and well-versed in literary arts, horse-riding and archery, but also respectful and courteous towards his tutors and elders. He was genuinely interested in getting to know people. In 247, Sun Quan ordered Zhuge Yi (諸葛壹) to pretend to defect to Wu's rival state, Wei, and lure the Wei general Zhuge Dan into a trap. When Sun Quan personally led the Wu forces to attack Zhuge Dan, Sun He showed grave concern about his father: he could not rest and have his meals in peace, repeatedly reminded his father to be careful, and hoped that his father would win the battle. He only put aside his worries upon seeing his father return safely to Wu.

During Sun Quan's reign, some Wu officials abused the system of bureaucracy and exploited loopholes to find fault with other. Sun He saw that this could potentially become a serious problem if officials continued to abuse the system for personal gain (e.g. taking petty revenge against colleagues), so he wrote a memorial to the imperial court urging them to take actions to discourage and eliminate such harmful practices. On one occasion, two officials, Liu Bao (劉寶) and Ding Yan (丁晏), made accusations against each other. Sun He told Ding Yan, "It's hard to find competent employees in both the civil and military sectors. If everyone starts attacking each other over trivial and petty disputes, then how can we expect to have prosperity?" He then stepped in to mediate the conflict and succeeded in helping them resolve their dispute.

Sun He heard that Cai Ying (蔡穎), a member of his personal staff, enjoyed playing weiqi and that many of Cai Ying's subordinates also picked up the game and spent a lot of time playing. As he saw that weiqi was an unproductive activity meant to be a hobby or pastime, he became worried that Cai Ying and the others would become complacent and neglect their duties from playing too much weiqi. He thus came up with an idea to subtly remind and motivate his subordinates. He called for a meeting and asked them to discuss the advantages and disadvantages of playing weiqi. One of them, Wei Yao (韋曜), went home, wrote an essay on this topic and presented it to Sun He, who had copies of it distributed among his personal staff.

=== Succession struggle against Sun Ba and deposal ===
Sun He's mother, Lady Wang, was not on good terms with Sun Quan's eldest daughter, Sun Luban. (Note: Sun Luban is also referred to as "Princess Quan" (全公主) because she married Quan Cong.) As a result, Sun Luban disliked her half-brother, Sun He. On one occasion, Sun Quan could not attend a ceremony at the imperial ancestral temple because he was sick, so he ordered Sun He to take his place. Zhang Xiu, an uncle of Sun He's wife Crown Princess Zhang (張太子妃), lived near the imperial ancestral temple so he invited Sun He to stay at his residence during that period. Sun Luban sent her servants to spy on Sun He and reported to her father that Sun He was not in the imperial ancestral temple and was instead staying with his in-laws and plotting something. She also used the opportunity to slander Sun He's mother, Lady Wang, whom she had a feud with, by telling Sun Quan that Lady Wang expressed glee when she heard that Sun Quan was sick. Sun Quan believed his daughter and became furious with Lady Wang. Lady Wang later died in distress. Sun He also fell out of his father's favour as a result and he became worried that his father would remove him from his position as Crown Prince.

Sometime in the 240s, Sun He became embroiled in a power struggle against his fourth brother, Sun Ba, the Prince of Lu, who wanted to seize the position of Crown Prince from him. In fact, it was Sun Quan himself who sowed the seeds of the conflict between his third and fourth sons. Although Sun Quan had already made Sun He the Crown Prince in 242, he also treated Sun Ba exceptionally well. After discussing among themselves, some officials strongly urged Sun Quan to ensure that Confucian rules of propriety were followed and upheld. For example, Sun He should be accorded greater honours and privileges as compared to Sun Ba because he, as the Crown Prince, was in a higher position compared to the other princes. However, Sun Quan failed to make a clear distinction between his sons, so the power struggle intensified over time as Sun He and Sun Ba started vying for their father's favour and attention. Two opposing factions also emerged from among Sun Quan's subjects: On one side, Lu Xun, Zhuge Ke, Gu Tan, Zhu Ju, Teng Yin, Shi Ji, Ding Mi (丁密) and Wu Can believed that Sun He was the rightful heir apparent so they supported him. On the other side, Bu Zhi, Lü Dai, Quan Cong, Lü Ju, Sun Hong (孫弘), Quan Ji (全寄), Yang Zhu (楊笁), Wu An (吳安) and Sun Qi (孫奇) supported Sun Ba. Quan Ji and Yang Zhu, in particular, frequently spoke ill of Sun He in front of Sun Quan. As the power struggle intensified, Sun Quan grew tired of it and told Sun Jun that he was worried that the power struggle would end up in a civil war like the one between Yuan Shao's sons. He wanted to end the power struggle and designate a new heir apparent, so he started taking action against some of the officials involved: Wu Can was imprisoned and executed later; Gu Tan was exiled to Jiao Province; Yang Zhu was executed and his body dumped into the river; Quan Ji, Wu An and Sun Qi were executed.

The historian Pei Songzhi, who annotated Sun He's biography in the Records of the Three Kingdoms, drew comparisons between the Sun He–Sun Ba succession struggle and other similar conflicts such as the one between Yuan Shao's sons and Liu Biao's sons. He commented that Sun Quan was worse than Yuan Shao and Liu Biao because, unlike Yuan Shao and Liu Biao who defied traditional norms of succession and made it clear that they wanted a younger son to succeed them, Sun Quan created ambiguity and uncertainty when he favoured Sun Ba despite having already designated Sun He as his heir apparent. Pei Songzhi criticised Bu Zhi, Lü Dai and Quan Cong for supporting Sun Ba because he deemed Sun Ba's claim to the succession as illegitimate. He also remarked that this incident had a huge negative impact on Bu Zhi in particular, because Bu Zhi had a reputation for being virtuous and generous.

After carefully considering some time, Sun Quan ordered Sun He to be put under house arrest. When Zhu Ju, Qu Huang (屈晃) and some other officials heard about it, they covered their heads in mud, tied themselves up, and came to plead with Sun Quan to release Sun He. When Sun Quan saw them, he felt angry and scolded them for creating a disturbance. Later, he had the intention of deposing Sun He and replacing him with Sun Liang, his youngest son. Two officials, Chen Zheng (陳正) and Chen Xiang (陳象), wrote a memorial to Sun Quan, citing the historical example of Shensheng and Xiqi to warn Sun Quan that changing the Crown Prince could lead to a civil war in the future. Zhu Ju and Qu Huang also repeatedly pressured Sun Quan to pardon Sun He. Sun Quan got fed up with them, so he executed Chen Zheng and Chen Xiang and had Zhu Ju and Qu Huang flogged 100 times. Qu Huang was later removed from office and sent back to his home town, while Zhu Ju was demoted and later tricked by Sun Hong (孫弘), a supporter of Sun Ba, into committing suicide. Zhang Chun (張純), one of Sun He's subordinates who also repeatedly begged Sun Quan to spare Sun He, was imprisoned and later executed.

In September or October 250, Sun Quan deposed Sun He from his position as Crown Prince and relocated him to Guzhang County (故鄣縣; northwest of present-day Anji County, Zhejiang). He also forced Sun Ba to commit suicide. Sun He's personal staff, numbering dozens, met different fates as some were executed while others were exiled or dismissed. Many people thought that it was a grave injustice to Sun He and his personal staff. In December 250 or January 251, Sun Quan designated his youngest son, Sun Liang, as the new Crown Prince to replace Sun He.

== Life after being deposed ==
When Sun Quan became critically ill between 250 and 252, he regretted his decision to depose Sun He and thought of restoring Sun He as Crown Prince. However, Sun Luban, Sun Jun, Sun Hong (孫弘) and others strongly objected to it, so he dismissed the idea.

In late January or February 252, Sun Quan made Sun He the Prince of Nanyang (南陽王), with Changsha Commandery (長沙郡; around present-day Changsha, Hunan) as his princedom. During his journey from Guzhang County to Changsha, Sun He saw a magpie's nest on a wall. Some people interpreted this as a sign that disaster would befall Sun He, while others thought that it was an auspicious sign since Sun He had now been restored to noble status after being deposed.

After Sun Quan's death in May 252, his youngest son Sun Liang succeeded him as the new emperor, with Zhuge Ke serving as the regent because the emperor was still too young at the time. Zhuge Ke was a maternal uncle of Sun He's wife, the former Crown Princess Zhang. The former crown princess sent a messenger, Chen Qian (陳遷), to the imperial capital Jianye (present-day Nanjing, Jiangsu) to meet Zhuge Ke. Before Chen Qian left, Zhuge Ke told him, "Please tell her that in a matter of time, I'll make her greater than others." There were rumours that Zhuge Ke wanted to depose Sun Liang and put Sun He on the throne. His behaviour became even more suspicious when he floated the idea of moving the imperial capital from Jianye to Wuchang (武昌; present-day Ezhou, Hubei).

In November or December 253, after Zhuge Ke was overthrown and assassinated in a coup d'état, Sun Jun became the new regent for Sun Liang. Sun Jun demoted Sun He back to commoner status, had him relocated to Xindu Commandery (新都郡; around present-day Yi County, Anhui), and then sent an emissary to force Sun He to commit suicide. As Sun He bid farewell to his wife, the former Crown Princess Zhang, before taking his own life, she told him, "I'll accompany you through thick and thin; I won't continue living on my own." She followed suit after he committed suicide. Sun He's concubine, Lady He, asked, "If we all die, who is going to raise the children?" She did not take her own life and lived on to raise Sun Hao (her son with Sun He) and his three younger brothers.

== Posthumous honours ==
In 264, after Sun He's son, Sun Hao, became the fourth emperor of Eastern Wu, he honoured his father with the posthumous title "Emperor Wen" (文皇帝) and had him reburied at the Ming Mausoleum (明陵), with officials and 200 households to watch over and maintain the tomb. In February or March 266, he separated nine counties from Wu Commandery and Danyang Commandery (丹楊郡) to form a new commandery, Wuxing Commandery (吳興郡), with its capital at Wucheng County (烏程縣; south of present-day Huzhou, Zhejiang). He appointed an Administrator (太守) to govern Wuxing Commandery and put him in charge of the organising the ceremonies to honour his father every season.

In August 267, Sun Hao heeded a suggestion from one of his officials to build a temple in the imperial capital, Jianye (present-day Nanjing, Jiangsu), to honour his father. He then put Xue Xu in charge of overseeing the construction of the temple, which was named "Qing Temple" (清廟). In January 268, he ordered Imperial Counsellor Meng Ren (孟仁) (Note: Meng Ren (孟仁), originally named Meng Zong (孟宗), was one of The Twenty-four Filial Exemplars.) and Minister of Ceremonies Yao Xin (姚信) to lead 2,000 troops to the Ming Mausoleum as part of an entourage to "escort" Sun He's spirit from the mausoleum to the temple. When the entourage reached Jianye, Sun He kept asking the priest conducting the ceremony about the condition of his father's spirit. After the priest told him that his father looked just the same as when he was still alive, Sun Hao shed tears of both sadness and joy and later rewarded his subjects. Sun Hao also ordered the Imperial Chancellor Lu Kai to oversee the sacrificing of animals in the neighbouring villages as offerings to his father's spirit. That night, Sun Hao slept outside Jianye. The following day, Sun Hao appeared very sad when his father's spirit was being enshrined in the temple. Over the subsequent days, he kept visiting the temple – three times within seven days – to pay respects to his father's spirit, and even ordered singers and dancers to entertain his father's spirit day and night. He only stopped doing so when an official told him that the entire ceremony would lose its sacredness if he performed it excessively.

== Family ==
Sun He had at least four sons – Sun Jun (孫俊), Sun Hao, Sun De (孫德) and Sun Qian (孫謙). Sun Jun was born to Sun He's wife Crown Princess Zhang (a daughter of Zhang Cheng), while Sun Hao was born to Sun He's concubine Lady He. It is not known who the mothers of Sun De and Sun Qian were, except that they were probably Sun He's concubines.

In 258, after Sun Quan's sixth son, Sun Xiu, replaced Sun Liang as the new Wu emperor, he enfeoffed Sun He's eldest son, Sun Hao, as the Marquis of Wucheng (烏程侯) with his marquisate in Xindu Commandery (新都郡; around present-day Yi County, Anhui). Sun Xiu also enfeoffed Sun De and Sun Qian as the Marquis of Qiantang (錢唐侯) and Marquis of Yong'an (永安侯) respectively, and appointed Sun Jun as a Cavalry Commandant (騎都尉). In 264, following Sun Xiu's death, Sun Hao succeeded him as the fourth emperor of Eastern Wu.

Sun Jun

Sun Jun had a reputation for being intelligent and bright, Sun Hao feared that he would pose a threat to him, so he found an excuse to have Sun Jun executed.

Sun De

Sun De's eventual fate remains unknown. He probably died early, or else Sun Hao might have purged him too.

Sun Qian

In late September or October 265, Sun Hao moved the imperial capital from Jianye (present-day Nanjing, Jiangsu) to Wuchang (武昌; present-day Ezhou, Hubei) and left Imperial Counsellor Ding Gu (丁固) and General of the Right Zhuge Jing in charge of Jianye. During this time, due to Sun Hao's tyrannical and oppressive rule, one Shi Dan (施但) from Wuxing Commandery (吳興郡; around present-day Huzhou, Zhejiang) rallied about 10,000 men and started a rebellion. The rebels took Sun Qian hostage and headed towards Jianye, where they intended to make Sun Qian the new emperor. When they were some 30 li away from Jianye, Sun Qian issued a decree to Ding Gu and Zhuge Jing, ordering them to submit to him. Zhuge Jing executed Sun Qian's messenger. When the rebels were about nine li away from Jianye, Ding Gu and Zhuge Jing led government forces from Jianye to attack them. As the rebels did not have body armour to protect themselves, they abandoned Sun Qian, who was sitting in a carriage, and fled at the sight of armoured soldiers marching towards them. Ding Gu and Zhuge Jing took Sun Qian captive but did not dare to execute him, so they sent a messenger to Wuchang to ask Sun Hao what to do with him. Sun Hao ordered Sun Qian and Sun Qian's mother to be poisoned to death.

Sun He's daughter

Sun He also had a daughter who was born to Crown Princess Zhang (Zhang Cheng's daughter). She married Lu Jing, who was born to Lu Kang and another daughter of Zhang Cheng; both Sun He's daughter and Lu Jing therefore were Zhang Cheng's maternal grandchildren.

== See also ==
- Eastern Wu family trees#Sun He (Zixiao)
- Lists of people of the Three Kingdoms
