= Sun Liang =

Eastern Wu emperor from 252 to 258

Sun Liang 孫亮

Emperor of Eastern Wu
- Reign: 21 May 252 – 9 November 258
- Predecessor: Sun Quan
- Successor: Sun Xiu

Crown Prince of Eastern Wu
- Tenure: December 250 or January 251 – 21 May 252
- Predecessor: Sun He
- Successor: Sun Wan

Prince of Kuaiji
- Tenure: 9 November 258 – 260

Marquis of Houguan
- Tenure: 260
- Born: 243
- Died: 260 (aged 17)
- Consort: Empress Quan
Names
- Family name: Sun (孫); Given name: Liang (亮); Courtesy name: Ziming (子明)
Era dates
- Jianxing (建興): 252–253; Wufeng (五鳳): 254–256; Taiping (太平): 256–258
- House: House of Sun
- Father: Sun Quan
- Mother: Empress Pan

Sun Liang (243 – 260), courtesy name Ziming, was the second emperor of the state of Eastern Wu during the Three Kingdoms period of China. He was the youngest son and heir of Sun Quan, the founding emperor of Wu. He is also known as the Prince of Kuaiji (會稽王) or (less frequently) Marquis of Houguan (候官侯), which were his successive titles after he was deposed in November 258 by the regent Sun Chen and is sometimes known as the Young Emperor (少帝). He was succeeded by his brother Sun Xiu, who managed to oust Sun Chen from power and kill him. Two years after Sun Liang's dethronement, he was falsely accused of treason and demoted from a prince to a marquis, after which he killed himself.

== Early life ==
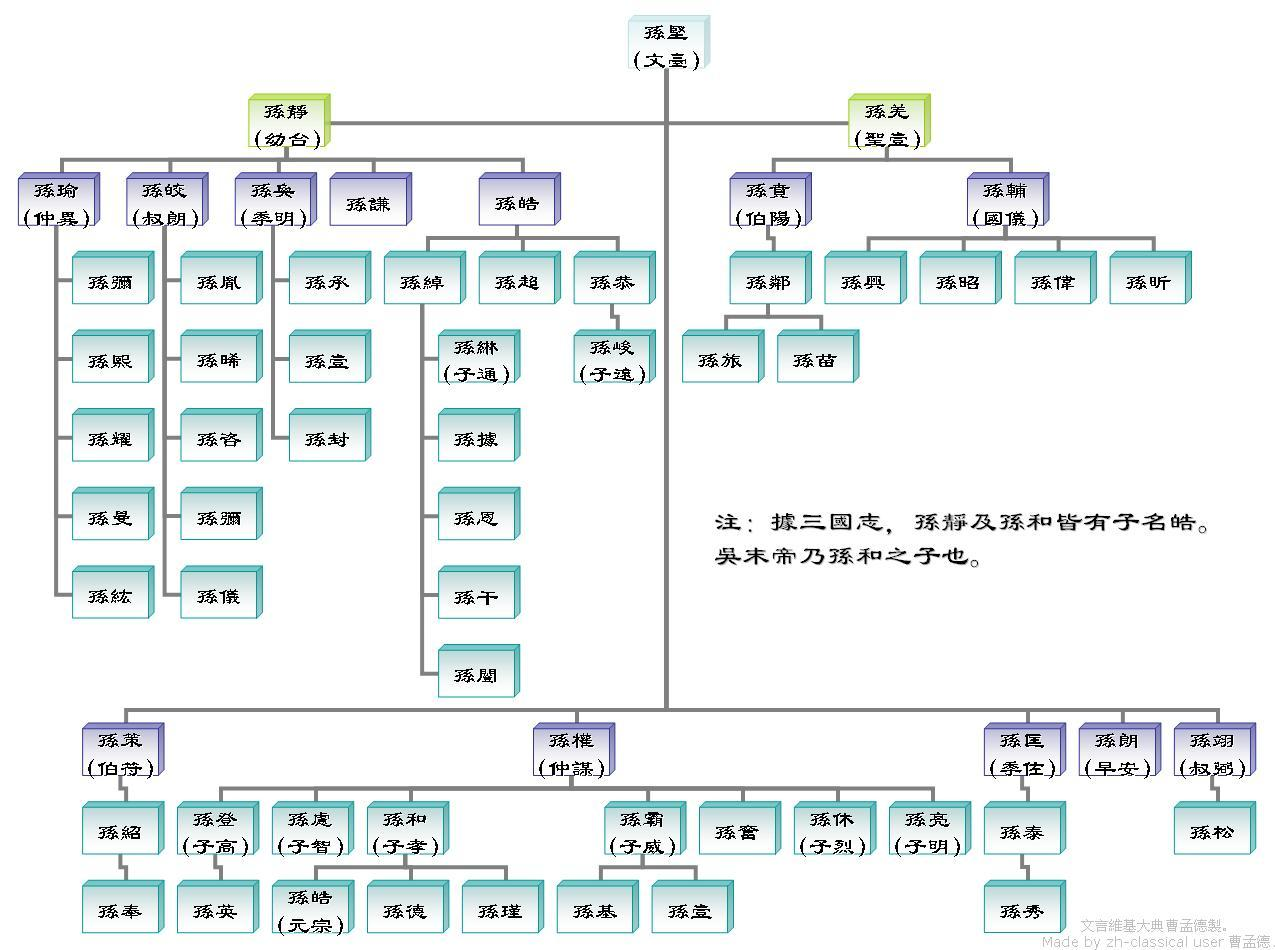
The family tree of the Sun clan, including Sun Quan, the founding emperor of Wu, China

Sun Liang was born in 243, to Sun Quan and one of his favourite consorts, Consort Pan. As Sun Quan's youngest son, he was well-cared for by his father, who was very happy to have a son in his old age. (Note: Sun Quan was 60 when Sun Liang was born.) He was also born in a palace atmosphere where officials were aligning themselves with either of his two older brothers who were fighting for supremacy – Sun He, the Crown Prince, and Sun Ba, the Prince of Lu, who had designs on the position. In September or October 250, (Note: According to Sun Quan's biography in Sanguozhi, Sun He was deposed as crown prince and Su Ba died in the 8th month of the 13th year of the Chiwu era of his reign. This corresponds to 14 Sep to 12 Oct 250 in the Julian calendar.) fed up with Sun Ba's constant attacks against Sun He, Sun Quan ordered Sun Ba to kill himself and deposed Sun He. At the urging of his eldest daughter Sun Luban, who had been making false accusations against Sun He and his mother Lady Wang and therefore wanted to see Sun He deposed, he made Sun Liang the new Crown Prince in December 250 or January 251. (Note: According to Sun Quan's biography in Sanguozhi, Sun Liang was made crown prince in the 11th month of the 13th year of the Chiwu era of his reign. This corresponds to 11 Dec 250 to 9 Jan 251 in the Julian calendar.) Sun Luban then had Sun Liang married to Quan Huijie, a grandniece of her husband, Quan Cong and connecting Sun Liang to a powerful local family. In 251, Sun Quan instated Sun Liang's mother, Consort Pan, as the Empress.

In 252, Sun Liang lost both his parents in rapid succession. Early that year, Empress Pan was murdered and in the winter Sun Quan died, so Sun Liang became the new emperor.

== Reign ==
=== Zhuge Ke's regency ===
Prior to his death, Sun Quan had selected Zhuge Ke as the regent for Sun Liang, on the advice of trusted kinsman Sun Jun, but he would last only eighteen months. On 17 February 253, Lady Quan was chosen to be his Empress. That same year Zhuge Ke launched a major campaign against the larger rival state of Cao Wei at Hefei but suffered a disastrous defeat which, combined with his handling of the aftermath, led to Zhuge Ke becoming vulnerable. Sun Jun turned against Zhuge Ke, he told Sun Liang that Zhuge Ke was plotting treason, and he set up a trap at a feast for Zhuge Ke. (Note: How much the young emperor knew of Sun Jun's plans and whether he concurred is unclear; traditional historians implied that Sun Liang knew and concurred, but he was just 10 years old at this point. The Wu Lu by Zhang Bao, the son of a Wu minister, claims Sun Liang denied responsibility for the order and had to be taken away by his wet-nurse but Pei Songzhi dismisses the claim as Sun Jun would have been relying on Sun Liang's authority and needed him there at the banquet.) During the middle of the feast, assassins that Sun Jun had arranged for killed Zhuge Ke, and Sun Jun's forces then wiped out the Zhuge family.

=== Sun Jun's regency ===
Sun Jun's rise to regent brought no stability to the Wu court, as there were almost annual coup attempts. Sun Jun had ordered the suicide of Sun He while his overall behaviour was arrogant, violent, and he would defile the women of Sun Liang's palace, earning him many an enemy. In the Autumn of 254 the plot of Sun Ying (孫英), the Marquis of Wu and son of former Crown Prince Sun Deng, and the army officer Huan Lü (桓慮) was exposed, and they were destroyed. In 255 Sun Lin sought to intervene in a rebellion by the Wei generals Guanqiu Jian and Wen Qin against the Wei controller Sima Shi, but though they would take in Wen Qin, Sun Jun withdrew after Sima Shi quickly put down the rebellion. That year would the plot of some military officers plot discovered which would strike at the Sun family as Sun Luban, the lover of Sun Jun and aunt of Sun Liang, falsely implicated her sister Sun Luyu in the plot.

In 256, Sun Jun, at Wen Qin's urging, was planning an attack against Cao Wei, when he suddenly fell mortally ill, and he commissioned his cousin Sun Chen to succeed him as regent.

=== Sun Chen's regency ===
Sun Jun's death would not bring an end to the court intrigue, as the northern families would continue to be forced out by southern magnates. Sun Chen saw off some powerful opponents, including senior minister Teng Yin and General Lü Ju, within the court and become extremely arrogant. Wu did have to send an envoy Diao Xuan (刁玄) to their allies Shu-Han to explain the recent troubles at court

In 257, at the age of 14, Sun Liang began to personally handle some important matters of state. He established a personal guard corps that he trained with every day, consisting of 3,000 young relatives of soldiers between 15 and 18 led by brave relatives of officers, stating that he intended to grow up with them. Sun Chen began to be somewhat apprehensive of the young emperor who was asking awkward questions, with Sun Liang showing signs of discontent at simply being required to rubber stamp rather than rule as his father had.

There was a problem with his cousin Sun Ji, son of Sun Ba, who served in the palace and was arrested for stealing a horse. Sun Liang asked Diao Xuan what the punishment for this was; he was informed it was death. But, Diao Xuan thought that given Sun Ba had been executed while young, Sun Liang might show pity. Sun Liang wanted to spare Sun Ji but did not wish to undermine the law by favouring a relative and gratefully seized upon Diao Xuan's suggestion of an amnesty for those in the palace.

Two sources tell a tale of Sun Liang's intelligence at that age. In the Wu Li, by contemporary Hu Chong who served Wu and had access to the imperial archives, tells of Sun Liang asking for honey to go with his plums but when it was brought to him, there were rat droppings in it. Sun Liang interrogated the eunuch assigned to bring the honey and the official in charge of managing the storehouse, both denied responsibility. Rather than have them both arrested and a full investigation start, the young Emperor broke open the droppings and, on seeing they were dry inside, knew they had only recently been added, and it was the eunuch to blame. Liu Song historian Pei Songzhi notes that had the eunuch added feces to the honey then it would have got wet anyway so the story isn't realistic but to display Sun Liang's intelligence. The alternative account is the Jiangbiao zhuan by Jin official Yu Pu, who collected tales in the area after Wu's fall, which tells of Sun Liang sending the eunuch to collect sugarcane that had been sent from Jiaozhi (modern day Vietnam) from the storehouse. (Note: An expensive process of refinement for sugar at the time and quite rare.) Given the eunuch had been sent with a silver bowl and a lid, the Emperor was surprised to discover rat droppings when it was presented with the eunuch accusing the official of being negligent. Sun Liang summoned the storehouse official and asked if the eunuch had a grudge. As it turned out, the official had rejected a past request from the eunuch; Sun Liang's suspicions about the eunuch were confirmed. The eunuch was whipped and sent for punishment.

=== Removal ===
Later that year, the Cao Wei general Zhuge Dan declared a rebellion against the regent Sima Zhao (Sima Shi's brother) and requested Eastern Wu assistance but Sun Chen's efforts to reinforce would prove ineffective. Zhuge Dan's rebellion failed in 258 with a major opportunity lost, and the Eastern Wu forces suffered a series of setbacks; the famed general Zhu Yi was executed by Sun Chen after retreating when supplies ran out, members of Quan clan surrendered to Sima Zhao and Wen Qin was executed by Zhuge Dan.

Sun Chen became unpopular due to the defeat and was concerned by Sun Liang's asking of difficult questions in the last year so he chose not to return to Jianye on grounds of illness but instead sent his younger brothers to entrench military authority at the capital. Sun Liang was not happy with his overpowerful minister's handling of the campaign, disrespectful attitude, refusing to follow orders or answer summons. A further cause of friction occurred when he began investigating his aunt Sun Luyu's death. Sun Luban, despite her role in the death of her sister, declared no knowledge and shifted blame onto Sun Luyu's sons Zhu Xiong and Zhu Sun. Sun Chen tried to intervene as Zhu Sun was married to his younger sister, but Sun Liang ordered Ding Feng to kill them both.

Sun Liang plotted with his sister Sun Luban, the general Liu Cheng (劉丞), his father-in-law Quan Shang (全尚), and his brother-in-law Quan Ji (全紀), to have Sun Chen overthrown. The Emperor told Quan Ji to have Quan Shang gather the Quan family's personal troops while Sun Liang would lead the palace guard, taking Sun Chen by surprise and surrounding them then using Sun Liang's authority to persuade Sun Chen's subordinates to submit without a fight. However, he warned that neither Quan Ji nor Quan Shang should not speak about the plan to Shang's wife as Sun Liang felt such matters were inappropriate for women and noted she was Sun Chen's cousin. However the plan leaked out to Sun Chen; the Records of the Three Kingdoms blames the Empress, who was Sun Chen's niece, but the Jiangbiao Zhuan says Quan Shang did not keep the plot secret from his wife and she was the one who told Sun Chen. Jin era commentator Sun Sheng backs the latter, more detailed version of events from Yu Pu and it is the version generally used.

During the evening of 9 November 258, Sun Chen moved quickly, his men captured Quan Shang and killed Liu Cheng and by daybreak, the regent had the palace surrounded. Sun Liang wanted to fight, mounting his horse and drawing his bow, declaring as the son of Sun Quan who had ruled for five years, nobody would disobey him. However his wet-nurses and eunuchs managed to stop the young ruler from charging out and over the next two days he refused to eat. The young Emperor let it be known to his wife and to Quan Ji his displeasure with how Quan Shang had failed him, Quan Ji would take his own life.

Sun Chen arranged a meeting with the high officials, declaring Sun Liang to be unintelligent and of poor moral character so he needed to be deposed. As Sun Chen threatened the officials, only Huan Yi (桓彝) (Note: He should not be confused with Huan Wen's father, who had the same name. This Huan Yi was a younger brother of the Wei official Huan Jie.) objected (and was promptly killed). In justifying his actions to Sun Xiu, Liang's elder brother and Chen's chosen candidate to replace Sun Liang, Sun Chen accused Sun Liang of extravagance in building works and creating over three hundred small boats of silver and gold. Sun Liang supposedly also seized women for his harem and men for his guard core who became unruly with armaments destroyed, creating fear by such actions and the inappropriate killing of the Zhu brothers. He also accused Sun Liang of ignoring warnings that Quan Shang was in the service of the rival Cao Wei dynasty. Similar charges to justify a change of a young Emperor were laid against Wei Emperor Cao Fang in 254 and Former Han Emperor Liu He in 74 BCE by their powerful controllers to justify the change of ruler. As word of Sun Liang's "misdeeds" were spread, Sun Liang was demoted to Prince of Kuaiji while his supporters were killed or exiled.

== Death and legacy ==
Sun Chen then made Sun Xiu, the Prince of Langye, the new emperor. Several months later, Sun Xiu set a trap for Sun Chen and had him arrested and killed. However, Sun Liang's position in exile did not become any safer, as Sun Xiu would prove ruthless in maintaining power. In July to November 260, there were rumours in Kuaiji that Sun Liang would be emperor again and in an investigation, members of the palace suggested Sun Liang was aiming for the throne and turning to magic users to pray for him. Sun Xiu demoted Sun Liang to a marquis under the title "Marquis of Houguan" and sent him to his marquisate in Houguan (Note: present-day Fuzhou, Fujian). Sun Liang died on the journey. The account in Records was that Sun Liang killed himself on the journey there with his guards executed, but the account in Wu Lu was that Sun Xiu had him poisoned. After the end of the war, during the Taikang era (280-289) of the reign of Emperor Wu of Jin, the former minister Dai Yong (戴顒) buried Sun Liang.

Chen Shou, the author of the Records of the Three Kingdoms, noted Sun Liang had just been a young boy and blamed the poor quality of regents that led to Sun Liang's inevitable fate. Pei Songzhi suggested Sun Liang taking control as one of the potential key points that might have saved the dynasty as being a viable route in preventing the last Wu Emperor Sun Hao from taking the throne, noted stories were made about Sun Liang's cleverness while Sun Sheng ruled out one version of why Sun Liang's plot leaked out due to Sun Liang's reputation for being intelligent.

There was said to be a letter by Sun Liang to Buddhist monks, expressing regret at the death of a major translator of Buddhist texts Zhi Qian, but the authenticity of the letter has been questioned.

=== Role in Fiction ===
Sun Liang appears in two scenes during the Records of the Three Kingdoms in Plain Language, a work published in the 13th century, as part of a series of historical fiction. Sun Liang is involved in the 215 Wu attack on Shu-Han for Wu's claim of Jingzhou, where Wu generals Lu Su and Lü Meng are heavily defeated by Shu-Han strategist Zhuge Liang. So Sun Liang leads 30,000 troops into Jing, and makes an oath proclaiming that while the provinces are close they have never cared for each other. He then gets beaten by Zhuge Liang. He only appears again following Zhuge Liang's 4th campaign against Wei when the Shu-Han court hears Sun Quan has died and Sun Liang has taken the throne.

The 14th-century novel Romance of the Three Kingdoms mostly follows the historical texts when it does cover the young Emperor. However, during Zhuge Ke's fall, Sun Liang personally visits the regent who claims to be ill and tells the plotters against Zhuge Ke that he fears Zhuge Ke and wishes him removed. He gives Sun Jun exceptional authority and only becomes concerned during Sun Chen's time. For the tale of intelligence, it follows the main account in the Records rather than Yu Pu's account. Following his removal from the throne, he gets a poem bemoaning the unjust removal of a wise lord while the editor Mao Zonggang notes the parallel of Sun Liang's fall due to the in-laws with Han Emperor Xian's failed Girdle Decree plot against his controller Cao Cao.

== See also ==
- Lists of people of the Three Kingdoms
- List of Chinese monarchs
- Eastern Wu family trees

== Notes ==
Prince of Kuaiji House of Sun Born: 244 Died: 260
Regnal titles
Preceded by Sun Quan	Emperor of Eastern Wu; 252–258 with Zhuge Ke (252–253); Sun Jun (253–256); Sun Chen (256–258)	Succeeded by Sun Xiu
Titles in pretence
Preceded by Sun Quan	— TITULAR — Emperor of China; 252–258; Reason for succession failure: Three Kingdoms	Succeeded by Sun Xiu
