= Sun Ba =

Eastern Wu imperial prince (died 250)

Sun Ba 孫霸

Prince of Lu (魯王)
- Tenure: September 242 – 250
- Born: between 224 and 235
- Died: September or October 250 (aged between 15 and 26)
- Spouse: Liu Ji's daughter
- Issue: Sun Ji; Sun Yi
Names
- Family name: Sun (孫); Given name: Ba (霸); Courtesy name: Ziwei (子威)
- House: House of Sun
- Father: Sun Quan
- Mother: Consort Xie

Sun Ba (before 235 (Note: While Sun Ba's birth year was not recorded, he was older than Sun Xiu (who was born in 235) and younger than Sun He (who was born in 224)) - September or October 250), courtesy name Ziwei, was an imperial prince of the Eastern Wu dynasty during the Three Kingdoms period of China. He was the fourth son of Sun Quan (Emperor Da), the founding emperor of the Eastern Wu.

== Life ==
Sun Ba was the fourth son of Sun Quan, a warlord who lived in the late Eastern Han dynasty and became the founding emperor of the Eastern Wu state in the Three Kingdoms period. His mother was Consort Xie (謝姬), a concubine of Sun Quan. He was enfeoffed as the Prince of Lu (魯王) in September 242.

Sometime in the 240s, Sun Ba became embroiled in a power struggle against his third brother, Sun He, the Crown Prince, (Note: Sun He became Crown Prince in 242 following the death of Sun Quan's eldest son and first heir apparent, Sun Deng, in 241. Sun Quan's second son, Sun Lü, died early so Sun He, as Sun Quan's eldest surviving son, became the new Crown Prince.) because he wanted to seize the succession from him. In fact, it was Sun Quan himself who sowed the seeds of the conflict between his third and fourth sons. Although Sun Quan had already made Sun He the Crown Prince in 242, he also treated Sun Ba exceptionally well. After discussing among themselves, some officials strongly urged Sun Quan to ensure that Confucian rules of propriety were followed and upheld. For example, Sun He should be accorded greater honours and privileges as compared to Sun Ba because he, as the Crown Prince, was in a higher position compared to the other princes. However, Sun Quan failed to make a clear distinction between his sons, so the power struggle intensified over time as Sun He and Sun Ba started vying for their father's favour and attention.

When Sun Quan noticed that the rivalry between his sons had a polarising effect on his subjects, he forbade his sons from interacting with the outside world, and ordered them to focus on academic studies. The official Yang Dao (羊衜) wrote a memorial to Sun Quan, urging the emperor to lift the ban on his sons interacting with the outside world. He pointed out that both Sun He and Sun Ba held considerable prestige among the literati and scholar-officials, who were eager to meet the two princes, so they should be allowed to interact with the outside world. Yang Dao also explained to Sun Quan that isolating the two princes from the outside world might make people think that Eastern Wu was experiencing internal instability and allow rumours to breed and spread. Sun Quan probably heeded Yang Dao's advice.

Two opposing factions also emerged from among Sun Quan's subjects: On one side, Lu Xun, Zhuge Ke, Gu Tan, Zhu Ju, Teng Yin, Shi Ji, Ding Mi (丁密) and Wu Can believed that Sun He was the rightful heir apparent so they supported him. On the other side, Bu Zhi, Lü Dai, Quan Cong, Lü Ju, Sun Hong (孫弘), Quan Ji (全寄), Yang Zhu (楊笁), Wu An (吳安) and Sun Qi (孫奇) supported Sun Ba. Quan Ji and Yang Zhu, in particular, frequently spoke ill of Sun He in front of Sun Quan. As the power struggle intensified, Sun Quan grew tired of it and told Sun Jun that he was worried that the power struggle would end up in a civil war like the one between Yuan Shao's sons. He wanted to end the power struggle and designate a new heir apparent, so he started taking action against some of the officials involved: Wu Can was imprisoned and executed later; Gu Tan was exiled to Jiao Province; Yang Zhu was executed and his body dumped into the river; Quan Ji, Wu An and Sun Qi were executed.

In September or October 250, Sun Quan deposed Sun He from his position as Crown Prince and relocated him to Guzhang County (故鄣縣; northwest of present-day Anji County, Zhejiang). He also forced Sun Ba to commit suicide. In December 250 or January 251, Sun Quan designated his youngest son, Sun Liang, as the new Crown Prince to replace Sun He.

== Family ==
Sun Ba married the daughter of Liu Ji. He had two sons: Sun Ji (孫基) and Sun Yi (孫壹). Sometime between 254 and 256, Sun Liang, who became the second emperor of Eastern Wu in 252, enfeoffed Sun Ji and Sun Yi as the Marquis of Wu (吳侯) and Marquis of Wanling (宛陵侯) respectively. He also allowed Sun Ji to serve as his personal attendant. In 257, Sun Ji was thrown into prison after he was caught stealing the emperor's horse. When Sun Liang asked Diao Xuan (刁玄) what punishment would be appropriate for Sun Ji, Diao Xuan told him that Sun Ji had committed a capital offence. However, Diao Xuan also advised Sun Liang to show leniency towards Sun Ji, and pointed out that Sun Liang could pardon Sun Ji or exile him. Sun Liang eventually chose to pardon Sun Ji.

In 264, Sun He's son, Sun Hao, became the fourth emperor of Eastern Wu. After his coronation, Sun Hao honoured his father with the posthumous title of an emperor, and recalled the succession struggle between his father and Sun Ba. He took revenge against Sun Ji and Sun Yi by stripping them of their noble titles and exiling them and their grandmother (Sun Ba's mother) to Wushang County (烏傷縣; present-day Yiwu, Zhejiang).

== See also ==
- Lists of people of the Three Kingdoms
- Eastern Wu family trees#Sun Ba
