= Teng Yin =

General of the state of Eastern Wu (died 256)

- 滕胤

Grand Marshal (大司馬)
- In office 4 November 256 – 8 November 256
- Monarch: Sun Liang
- Preceded by: Lü Dai

General of the Guards (衛將軍)
- In office May or June 252 – 4 November 256
- Monarch: Sun Liang

Personal details
- Born: Unknown
- Died: 8 November 256 (Note: Sun Liang's biography in the Sanguozhi recorded that Teng Yin died on the dingwei day of the 10th month of the 1st year of the Taiping era of Sun Liang's reign. This date corresponds to 8 November 256 in the Gregorian calendar.)
- Spouse: Lady Sun
- Relations: Empress Teng Fanglan (relative)
- Children: Zhuge Song's (son of Zhuge Ke) wife; Wu Zuan's (grandson of Wu Jing) wife
- Parent: Teng Zhou (father)
- Occupation: General
- Courtesy name: Chengsi (承嗣)
- Peerage: Marquis of Gaomi (高密侯)

Teng Yin (died 8 November 256), courtesy name Chengsi, was a military general of the state of Eastern Wu during the Three Kingdoms period of China. Teng Yin plotted the assassination of regent Sun Chen, who assumed regency after Sun Jun's death. However, Sun Chen discovered the plot, and accused him of treason. Teng and his clan were executed. Around the same time, Lü Ju tried to depose Sun Chen through military means, but failed; Lü was forced to commit suicide.

== Life ==
Teng Yin's hometown was Ju county in Beihai Commandery; during the chaotic end of the Han dynasty, his father Teng Zhou (滕胄) and uncle Teng Dan (滕耽) fled south to join Liu Yao.

After Zhuge Ke's death in late 253, it was initially expected that Zhuge Ke's authority would be divided between Sun Jun and Teng Yin, but someone proposed power should be kept within the imperial clan and Teng Yin commanded too much popular support. Teng Yin used his familial connections to Zhuge Ke as a reason to offer his resignation, but Sun Jun rejected this argument, instead upgrading Teng Yin's noble title. Although the two were frequently at odds, in public, as the two most senior officials, they gave an outward appearance of harmony.

== See also ==
- Lists of people of the Three Kingdoms
