= Zhuge Ke =

Eastern Wu general and politician (203–253)

- 諸葛恪
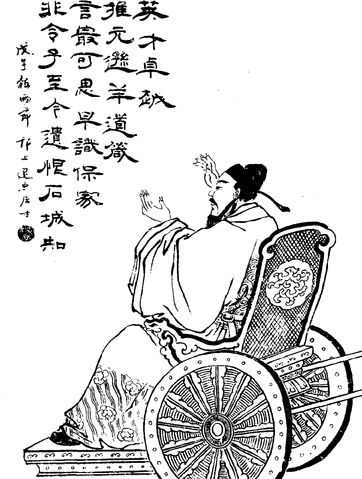
- A Qing dynasty illustration of Zhuge Ke

Governor of Jing and Yang Provinces (荊、揚州牧)
- In office May or June 252 – November or December 253
- Monarch: Sun Liang

Grand Tutor (太傅)
- In office May or June 252 – November or December 253
- Monarch: Sun Liang

Grand Tutor of the Crown Prince (太子太傅)
- In office December 251 or January 252 – 21 May 252
- Monarch: Sun Quan

General-in-Chief (大將軍)
- In office September or October 246 – December 251 or January 252
- Monarch: Sun Quan
- Chancellor: Bu Zhi (246–247); Zhu Ju (249–250)

General Who Awes the North (威北將軍)
- In office ? – September or October 246
- Monarch: Sun Quan
- Chancellor: Gu Yong (until 243); Lu Xun (244–245)

Administrator of Danyang (丹陽太守)
- In office 234 – ?
- Monarch: Sun Quan
- Chancellor: Gu Yong

General Who Pacifies the Yue (撫越將軍)
- In office 234 – ?
- Monarch: Sun Quan
- Chancellor: Gu Yong

Personal details
- Born: 203
- Died: November or December 253 (aged 50) (Note: Sun Liang's biography in the Sanguozhi recorded that Zhuge Ke died in the 10th month of the 2nd year of the Jian'xing era of Sun Liang's reign. This month corresponds to 8 November to 7 December 253 in the Gregorian calendar.)
- Relations: Zhuge Qiao (brother); Zhuge Rong (brother); Zhang Cheng's wife (sister); Zhuge Liang (uncle)
- Children: Zhuge Chuo; Zhuge Song; Zhuge Jian
- Parent: Zhuge Jin (father)
- Occupation: Military general, politician
- Courtesy name: Yuanxun (元遜)
- Peerage: Marquis of Yangdu (陽都侯)

Zhuge Ke (203 – November or December 253), courtesy name Yuanxun (元逊), was a Chinese military general and politician of the state of Eastern Wu during the Three Kingdoms period of China. He was the eldest son of Zhuge Jin, a military general who served under Wu's founding emperor, Sun Quan. After Sun Quan's death in 252, Zhuge Ke served as regent for Sun Quan's son and successor, Sun Liang, but the regency proved to be militarily disastrous due to Zhuge Ke's aggressive foreign policy towards Wu's rival state, Cao Wei. In 253, he was ousted from power in a coup d'état and killed along with his family.

== Early life and career ==
In the Record of Wu (吴录), Chinese author Zhang Bo noted that Zhuge Ke was a loud spoken man and was about 182–184 cm tall, and that he had a crooked nose, wide forehead, large mouth, with little facial hair and eyebrows.

In 221, when the Wu king Sun Quan designated his son Sun Deng as crown prince, he set up a staff for the crown prince composed of the sons of key officials in his government or other well-known younger members of the administration. The four most prominent ones were Zhuge Ke (Zhuge Jin's son), Zhang Xiu (Zhang Zhao's son), Gu Tan (Gu Yong's grandson) and Chen Biao (Chen Wu's son). Sun Deng treated the four of them as his close friends and they served as his advisers. When he ordered his secretary Hu Zong (胡綜) to write a commentary on four of his advisers in 229, Hu Zong wrote that Zhuge Ke was the most skillful and intelligent of his generation. While this might have been true, Zhuge Ke was also known for being reckless – a negative trait that his father Zhuge Jin repeatedly chided him for. On one occasion, Zhuge Jin observed, "This child will either bring great honour to my household or destroy it."

After Sun Quan declared himself emperor in 229 and again designated Sun Deng as his crown prince, the four attendants were promoted to commandants under various titles; Zhuge Ke continued playing a supporting role to Sun Deng. Among his four attendants, Sun Deng favoured and trusted Zhuge Ke and Gu Tan the most, and he regarded them more highly than others such as Fan Shen (范慎), Xie Jing (謝景) and Yang Hui (羊徽).

After Hu Zong made his commentary public, Yang Dao (羊衜) commented to Hu in private on the four's shortcomings; Yang's criticism of Zhuge Ke was that "Yuanxun (Zhuge's courtesy name) is talented but neglectful." Later, Yang's criticism of the four became known to them, estranging them from Yang. However, eventually all four failed at politics, causing the people of Wu to comment that Yang's criticisms were valid.

== Pacifying the Shanyue ==
Around 234, Zhuge Ke submitted a plan to Sun Quan to suppress the indigenous Shanyue tribes and recruit about 40,000 locals to serve as soldiers in Danyang Commandery (丹陽郡; around present-day Xuancheng, Anhui). Most of Sun Quan's senior officials, including Zhuge Ke's father Zhuge Jin, considered the plan reckless and costly; Zhuge Jin was recorded to have commented, "If Ke does not bring great fortune to our clan, he'll bring great disaster instead.". However, after Zhuge Ke insisted that his plan would be successful, Sun Quan appointed him as the Administrator (太守) of Danyang Commandery and General Who Pacifies the Yue (撫越將軍), effectively giving him full authority to implement his plan. Once Zhuge Ke arrived in Danyang Commandery, he requested the Administrators of the four neighbouring commanderies to seal their borders and refrain from using military force against the Shanyue. When the harvesting season arrived, he gave orders to quickly harvest the grain and stockpile them far away from the imperilment of the potential threat posed by the pilfering Shanyue. The Shanyue, deprived of food supplies, were inevitably left without any alternative options but to ultimately surrender to Zhuge Ke, who treated them kindly and earned their respect. By 237, Danyang Commandery was completely under the Wu government's control and had become a highly productive commandery for manpower and supplies. Zhuge Ke was also able to easily fulfill his quota of conscripting 40,000 local men to serve as soldiers. Sun Quan was so impressed with Zhuge Ke that he promoted him to General Who Awes the North (威北將軍) and awarded him the title of a Marquis of a Chief District (都鄉侯).

== Planned attack on Shouchun ==
In 243, Zhuge Ke planned to launch a major attack on Shouchun (壽春; around present-day Shou County, Anhui), a strategic location in Eastern Wu's rival state, Cao Wei. After he positioned his forces in preparation for the attack, the Wei general Sima Yi showed up with his troops to defend Shouchun and counterattack Zhuge Ke. Instead of allowing Zhuge Ke to engage Sima Yi, Sun Quan ordered him to retreat to Wu. Despite his withdrawal, Zhuge Ke became famous among the Wu people for willing to stand up to Sima Yi, who had a huge reputation in Wei. The Wu general Lu Xun was concerned about Zhuge Ke's recklessness so he wrote a letter to him, urging him to be more cautious in the future. Zhuge Ke decided to defer to Lu Xun, who was much more senior than him, so he wrote back and apologised for his attitude. After Lu Xun's death in 245, Sun Quan appointed Zhuge Ke as General-in-Chief (大將軍) and ordered him to assume Lu Xun's role at Wuchang (武昌; present-day Ezhou, Hubei) to supervise military affairs in Jing Province.

== Appointment as regent ==
In 251, when Sun Quan became critically ill, he sought a regent for his young son and heir apparent, Sun Liang. One of his close aides, Sun Jun, recommended Zhuge Ke. Although Sun Quan had second thoughts about Zhuge Ke, particularly his arrogance, he eventually heeded Sun Jun's advice and recalled Zhuge Ke back from Wuchang to the Wu imperial capital, Jianye. Before Zhuge Ke left Wuchang, the senior Wu general Lü Dai told him, "What you will be doing is a difficult task. Before you do anything, you should reconsider ten times." Zhuge Ke responded in a disrespectful manner: "When Ji Wenzi (季文子) reconsidered thrice before acting, Confucius told him, 'Only reconsider twice.' You, Sir, are telling me to reconsider ten times. Are you not saying that I am stupid?" Lü Dai did not respond. Historians interpreted this incident as a sign of Zhuge Ke's growing arrogance and recklessness. Indeed, Zhuge Ke became more arrogant after his appointment as regent, and especially after a dying Sun Quan instructed his subjects to let Zhuge Ke review all important policy decisions first.

== As regent to Sun Liang ==
Sun Quan died in 252 and was succeeded by Sun Liang, who became the second emperor of Eastern Wu. After his coronation, Sun Liang appointed Zhuge Ke as Grand Tutor (太傅). During his short tenure as regent, Zhuge Ke relaxed some of the strict laws enacted in Sun Quan's reign and reduced tax rates. The people of Wu were very pleased with him; wherever he went, there were massive crowds jostling to get a better view of him.

=== Battle of Dongxing ===
In late 252, Zhuge Ke gave orders to rebuild the dam at Dongxing (東興; in present-day Chaohu, Anhui), which was constructed earlier in 230 but had been destroyed in 241. His plan was to create a reservoir near the Chao Lake and use it as a defensive structure against potential invasions from Wei, as well as to construct two castles nearby to serve as forward attack mechanisms for Wu ships. In response, the Wei regent Sima Shi sent three separate forces to attack Wu, with the main one focusing on the Dongxing dam. Zhuge Ke, along with the veteran Wu general Ding Feng and others, caught the enemy off guard by pretending to lower their guard, and inflicted a devastating defeat on them and forced them to withdraw from Dongxing.

=== Battle of Hefei ===
In 253, Zhuge Ke prepared for another invasion of Wei and said that he wanted to take advantage of Sima Shi's "youth and inexperience" (even though Sima Shi was 45 years old then). Despite strong opposition from some Wu officials, Zhuge Ke rallied an army from among all able-bodied men in Wu for the invasion. He also coordinated the invasion with Jiang Wei, a general from Wu's ally state Shu Han. (At the time, Jiang Wei was also actively launching a series of campaigns against Wei at Wei's western border.)

However, Zhuge Ke's strategy turned out to be flawed when he switched his target from Shouchun (壽春; around present-day Shou County, Anhui) to Hefei, even though Hefei's defences were much stronger and built to withstand enemy attacks. After a long siege, the Wu forces failed to breach Hefei's walls. When a plague broke out in the Wu army, Zhuge Ke ignored it and continued to press on the siege. He only withdrew after hearing that Wei reinforcements had arrived. Instead of returning to the Wu imperial capital Jianye to apologise for his mistakes, he stayed away from Jianye for some time and refused to take responsibility for the Wu defeat.

== Downfall, death and posthumous rehabilitation ==
When Zhuge Ke returned to Jianye later in 253, he attempted to wipe out all dissent against him by punishing those who disagreed with him. He also made plans for another invasion of Wei, despite much resentment from the people over the heavy losses incurred from the previous campaign.

Sun Jun, a Wu general distantly related to the Wu emperor Sun Liang, decided to launch a coup d'état against Zhuge Ke to oust him from power. He lied to Sun Liang that Zhuge Ke was secretly plotting to usurp the throne and then set up a trap for Zhuge Ke. (The extent of Sun Liang's involvement in the coup d'état is unclear. However, historians traditionally consider him to have understood and approved Sun Jun's actions even though he was only about 10 years old then.) Zhuge Ke met his end at the hands of Sun Jun's assassins when he unsuspectingly attended a banquet hosted by Sun Liang in the imperial palace. After Zhuge Ke's death, Sun Jun used the opportunity to send his troops to capture and execute Zhuge Ke's family members.

Sun Jun became the new Wu regent after Zhuge Ke's death and he monopolised state power until his death in 256, after which his cousin Sun Chen succeeded him and continued to rule as regent. In 258, Sun Chen deposed Sun Liang and replaced him with his brother Sun Xiu as the new Wu emperor. Sun Xiu staged a coup against Sun Chen shortly after his accession to the throne and succeeded in eliminating him. Sun Xiu posthumously rehabilitated Zhuge Ke and ordered him to be reburied with full honours. However, he refused to have a monument built to commemorate Zhuge Ke when someone suggested doing so, because he felt that Zhuge Ke's recklessness and the losses he caused to Wu made him unworthy of such commemoration.

== Anecdotes and legends ==
An anecdote goes that sometime in Zhuge Ke's childhood or adolescence, he attended a banquet hosted by the Wu ruler Sun Quan. Among the Wu officials, there was a joke that Zhuge Jin (Zhuge Ke's father) had a very long face like a donkey's. Sun Quan played along by ordering a donkey to be brought to the banquet, bearing a sign which said "Zhuge Ziyu". ("Ziyu" was Zhuge Jin's courtesy name.) Zhuge Ke then knelt and asked for permission to add any two characters to the sign. After Sun Quan granted the request, Zhuge Ke added zhi lü (之驢; "the donkey of"), causing those present to roar with laughter. Sun Quan was impressed with the young Zhuge Ke's wit, and gifted the donkey to him.

In another anecdote, also in a banquet setting, Sun Quan once asked Zhuge Ke whether he thought that his father Zhuge Jin was better compared to his uncle Zhuge Liang, the Imperial Chancellor of Wu's ally state Shu Han. When Zhuge Ke said his father was better, Sun Quan asked him why and he replied, "My father chose the right Emperor to serve while my uncle didn't. Therefore, my father is better than my uncle." Impressed by the subtle flattery, Sun Quan instructed Zhuge Ke to serve wine to the other guests present at the banquet. (It was an honour for junior officials to serve wine to senior officials at the time.) When Zhuge Ke came to Zhang Zhao, the latter refused to drink and said, "This isn't the proper form for a ceremony to pay respect to an elder." After learning of Zhang Zhao's refusal, Sun Quan told Zhuge Ke, "Get Zhang Zhao to drink for me." Zhuge Ke then returned to Zhang Zhao and said, "Long ago, the great strategist Jiang Ziya, at the age of 90, went to battle holding a signal flag and carrying a battleaxe; he never considered himself old. In days of trial by arms, you are always in the rear; in days of feasting, you are always in the front. What do you mean when you say this is not a proper ceremony to pay respect to an elder?" At a loss for words, Zhang Zhao consented and accepted the wine offered by Zhuge Ke. After this incident, Sun Quan regarded Zhuge Ke even more highly and consequently appointed him as a close aide to his then-heir apparent, Sun Deng.

On another occasion, an ambassador from Wu's ally state, Shu, showed up with a gift of horses for Sun Quan. Knowing that Zhuge Ke was a good rider, Sun Quan summoned him with the intention of giving him one of the horses. When Zhuge Ke arrived, he immediately knelt down and thanked Sun Quan for the gift. Sun Quan was surprised at how Zhuge Ke already knew why he was summoned there, so he asked him. Zhuge Ke replied, "Shu is only capable of serving as Your Majesty's stable. That is why I am certain that the ambassador came here to offer a tribute of fine steeds." Sun Quan was impressed.

== See also ==
- Lists of people of the Three Kingdoms
