= Battle of Jiangling (223) =

Battle between states of Wei and Wu (222-223)

- Part of the wars of the Three Kingdoms period
| Date | c. October 222 – April 223 (Note: The Zizhi Tongjian recorded that the Battle of Jiangling took place between the 9th month of the 3rd year and the 2nd month of the 4th year of the Huangchu era of Cao Pi's reign. This period corresponds to 23 October 222 to 17 April 223 in the Gregorian calendar.) |
| Location | Western banks and middle region of the Yangtze River, in Jing Province (Jiangling and Nan Commandery) |
| Result | Cao Wei retreat; overall stalemate |

Belligerents
| Cao Wei | Eastern Wu |

Commanders and leaders
| Cao Pi (stationed in Wancheng); Cao Zhen (frontline commander) | Zhu Ran |

Strength
| | ≈5,000 (Note: The Sanguozhi recorded that many Eastern Wu soldiers were affected by disease. Only about 5,000 men were able to fight.) |

The Battle of Jiangling (Chinese: 江陵之戰) was fought between the forces of the Cao Wei and Eastern Wu dynasties in the early Three Kingdoms period of China. The battle, which took place around present-day Jiangling County, Hubei, was an integral part of the Wei emperor Cao Pi's three-pronged campaign against the Wu leader Sun Quan. It spanned a period of about six months from October 222 to April 223. Of the three fronts, the most critical Wei attacks were concentrated against the Wu fortress at Jiangling.

== Background ==
When Liu Bei attacked Sun Quan in the Battle of Xiaoting of 221–222, Sun Quan sent his envoys with gifts to relate his wish to submit to Cao Pi, who in 220 ended the Eastern Han dynasty and established the state of Wei. As such, Sun Quan nominally became a vassal under Wei, but actually operated his Wu regime independently like he used to. Cao Pi's adviser Liu Ye suggested to his lord to attack Sun Quan while the latter was fighting Liu Bei, but Cao Pi rejected the proposal because he needed Sun Quan's submissive posture to solidify his authority as the legitimate founder of a new dynasty.

After Sun Quan defeated Liu Bei around October 222 at the Battle of Xiaoting, Cao Pi began to make plans on taking advantage on Sun Quan, despite opposition from Liu Ye. Wei troops were mobilised in late October or November 222, and Cao Pi repeatedly requested Sun Quan to send his firstborn son to Wei as a hostage, prompting Sun Quan to send a humble letter of apology. However, Sun Quan could not agree on sending his son to Cao Pi, which ended the peace negotiations and started the war.

Cao Xiu was ordered by Cao Pi to attack Dongkou and Cao Ren was entrusted to take Ruxu; Cao Zhen and Xiahou Shang were put in charge of taking Jiangling (present-day Jingzhou City, Hubei), the capital of Nan Commandery and Jing Province. In November 222, Sun Quan adopted Huangwu (黃武) as the era name of his reign, and formally declared independence from Wei.

== The battle ==
=== Wei's advancement ===
When the armies were moving onto Wu, Sun Quan tried to arrange diplomatic agreements between himself and Wei, but they were all rejected. The only other choice was to send an envoy to Liu Bei, which succeeded.

The first objective of the Wei forces was to attack and capture Nan Commandery, which would open up the opportunity to capture Jiangling. The forces of Wei were dispatched from possibly Xiangyang and Fancheng. Cao Zhen, Xiahou Shang and Zhang He attacked Jiangling County, as Cao Pi moved a supporting force from the Wei capital Luoyang to Wancheng in case of any required backup. At this time, it was very critical and uneasy for the Wu forces, since the commander, Zhu Ran was in control of a very low number of troops. Quickly, the Wei forces overran the Wu forces at Nan Commandery, after Zhang He defeated Sun Sheng (孫盛). The Wei forces then made way to assist the main army's siege of Jiangling County.

=== Siege of Jiangling ===
The forces led by Zhang He immediately used the south side of the Yangtze below Jiangling County and the north banks to build pontoon bridges to cut off supplies from the Wu commander Zhu Ran, whose forces were shut inside the city. Zhu Ran also had to face the task of keeping order within the city. For example, when the city was running low on its water supply, some civilians and soldiers tried to surrender to Wei by opening the gates, but Zhu Ran put an end to the plot.

However, the position where the Wei forces set up the pontoon bridges was too exposed to be maintained by the Wei forces. Soon, another batch of Wu reinforcements led by Zhuge Jin and Yang Can (楊粲) arrived. Pan Zhang said: "The Wei army's prowess was formidable at the beginning, and the river waters were shallow, so we could not match them at first." Pan Zhang then ordered his men to move to 50 li upstream from the Wei army's location. They cut down and bundled together large quantities of reeds from the river to make big rafts, and sent them afloat down the river towards the pontoon bridges. The reeds were set on fire, therefore burning down the pontoon bridges to a crisp. The Wu forces then executed a counterattack on the Wei forces.

The conflict would go on six months well into April 223 before a plague broke out in the Wei camp, causing the Wei forces to withdraw from the siege in defeat. By early summer 223, Cao Pi had already returned to the capital at Luoyang.

== Aftermath ==
During the time of the withdrawal from Jiangling, the battles at Dongkou and Ruxu also ended in failure for the Wei side and they withdrew as well.

== Order of battle ==
=== Wei forces ===
Forces attacking Jiangling County and Nan Commandery:

- Senior General of the Upper Army (上軍大將軍) Cao Zhen
  - Palace Attendant (侍中) Xin Pi
  - Senior General Who Attacks the South (征南大將軍) Xiahou Shang
    - Shi Jian (石建)
    - Gao Qian (高遷)
  - General of the Left (左將軍) Zhang He
  - General of the Right (右將軍) Xu Huang

Supporting forces at Wancheng:

- Emperor Cao Pi
  - Palace Attendant (侍中) Dong Zhao
  - Palace Attendant (侍中) Liu Ye
  - General Who Attacks Rebels (討逆將軍) Wen Ping

=== Wu forces ===
Defending forces in Jiangling:

- General Who Attacks the North (征北將軍) Zhu Ran
  - Prefect of Jiangling (江陵令) Yao Tai (姚泰). On seeing that Jiangling's defenders were outnumbered by Wei forces, and supplies in the fortress were running low, he attempted to collaborate with the enemy. However his plot was discovered and he was killed.
  - † Jiang Yi (蒋壹). Killed in battle at Nan Commandery.

Reinforcements:

- General Who Pacifies the North (平北將軍) Pan Zhang
- General of the Left (左將軍) Zhuge Jin
- Yang Can (楊粲)
- Sun Sheng (孫盛)
