= Battle of Dongkou =

Naval battle between the states of Cao Wei and Wu (222-223)

- Part of the wars of the Three Kingdoms period
Date	October 222 – January 223
Location	Dongkou (洞口; along the Yangtze near present-day Liyang, Jiangsu)
Result	Wu victory; overall stalemate; Wei army retreats

Belligerents
Cao Wei	Eastern Wu

Commanders and leaders
Cao Xiu	Lü Fan

The Battle of Dongkou was a naval battle fought between October 222 and January 223 between forces of the state of Cao Wei and the Kingdom of Wu during the Three Kingdoms period of China. The battle concluded in a Wu victory.

== Background ==
After the Shu emperor Liu Bei was defeated by Sun Quan's forces at the Battle of Xiaoting, Sun benefited from his submission to the Wei ruler Cao Pi; who would help Sun in the conflict against Liu Bei. However, on both sides of the two forces, this was never a popular concept, especially in the ranks of Sun Quan, who defeated Cao Cao at the Battle of Red Cliffs 14 years earlier, after having resisted surrender. To make matters worse, Cao Pi and his officers were uneasy about Sun's titles and ranks (such as King of Wu) because it was quite inappropriate since they were considered a vassal state under Wei. It was even considered within Sun Quan's forces that the alliance with Wei was pointless, because the defeat they caused Liu Bei at Xiaoting was so critical that it meant that their alliance with Wei was no longer necessary for survival. Sun Quan also appeared as if he was planning to have this alliance go not much longer than it was supposed to.

In a matter of time, Cao Pi's plan to keep Sun Quan and Shu's relations sour backfired as Sun Quan and Liu Bei rekindled their alliance. In an attempt to improve his own relations with the Sun clan, he demanded Sun Deng (Sun Quan's eldest son) to be sent to the Wei capital Luoyang as a hostage. However Sun Quan declined this request, and later apologised to Cao Pi, stating his son was still very young and vulnerable in his health to be away from his home and family. Cao Pi did not bring up or press the matter. However Cao Pi demanded Sun Deng as hostage again soon. This was also declined.

Diplomatic ties between the two continued to sour until finally, Cao Pi decided to attack Sun Quan. Sun Quan would repetitively send envoys to negotiate peace between the two, but resulted in failure. Soon after, Sun Quan would proceed to declare independence in November 222.

== The battle ==
=== First moves ===
In late October 222, Cao Pi ordered Cao Xiu, Zhang Liao and Zang Ba to attack Dongkou (洞口); Cao Ren to attack Ruxu (濡須); and Cao Zhen, Xiahou Shang, Zhang He and Xu Huang to besiege Nan Commandery (南郡). In response, Sun Quan put Lü Fan in command of five armies to resist Cao Xiu; Zhuge Jin, Pan Zhang and Yang Can (楊粲) were dispatched to relieve the siege on Nan Commandery which was being defended by Zhu Ran while Zhu Huan defended the fortress of Ruxu from Cao Ren.

=== Wei offensive ===
Initially, the Wei forces easily penetrated the Wu front lines, no doubt because of their strength. In addition, Lü Fan's forces were hit by a storm, causing serious damage, although Cao Xiu also achieved little out of his initial efforts because of the storm. He was hot-headed, and he had to be advised strongly by his troops. Dong Zhao also assured Cao Pi that Cao Xiu's troops would do this. Sun Quan was afraid when he heard that Zhang Liao was participating in the campaign, and said to his subordinates, "Zhang Liao may be ill, but he is still a foe to be reckoned with. Be careful!" Zhang Liao and the Wei generals later defeated Lü Fan. When Cao Xiu, Zhang Liao and Zang Ba launched their attack, Lü Fan, along with Xu Sheng, Quan Cong and Sun Shao, led naval forces to resist the enemy at Dongkou.

By this time it was early 223, and Cao Xiu ordered Zang Ba to attack Sun's small stronghold at Xuling. However, Zang Ba achieved nothing and was quickly defeated. Nonetheless, Cao Xiu eventually managed to gain the advantage as Lü Fan's forces were beginning to struggle.

=== Turn of events and Wei retreat ===
Miraculously, reinforcements arrived and Lü Fan's generals Sun Shao and Xu Sheng managed to resist the Wei forces, continuously gaining morale due to the Wei struggle at Nan commandery and other locations along the western area of the Yangtze. Eventually, Cao Xiu and the Wei forces at Dongkou were repelled and withdrew to the Wei capital Luoyang.

== Aftermath ==
Following the Wei defeat at Dongkou and failed invasion of the western Yangtze region, Sun Quan took his chance to launch an offensive during the summer of 223, successfully destroying the new Wei Commandery at Qichun. The success of Sun Quan during his resistance against the Wei invasions would soon inspire Sun Quan to declaring himself emperor of Eastern Wu, being the last to establish the three dynasties during the Three Kingdoms period.

Sun Lang, also was banished from the Sun clan, and had to change his name to Ding Lang and was expelled from the army.

== Order of battle ==
=== Wei forces ===
- Senior General who Conquers the East (征東大將軍) Cao Xiu
  - Military Adviser (軍師) Zhao Yan
- General of the Vanguard (前將軍) Zhang Liao
- General Who Guards the East (鎮東將軍) Zang Ba
- † Yin Li

=== Sun Quan's forces ===
- General of the Vanguard (前將軍) Lü Fan
- General Who Stabilises the East (安東將軍) He Qi
- General Who Builds Martial Might (建武將軍) Xu Sheng
- General Who Spreads Might (揚威將軍) Sun Shao
- Lieutenant-General (偏將軍) Quan Cong
- Sun Lang

== In Romance of the Three Kingdoms ==
In the historical novel Romance of the Three Kingdoms, the Wei general Zhang Liao was killed in this battle while defending Cao Pi from an attack by the Wu general Ding Feng. He was hit in the waist by an arrow fired by Ding Feng and died from his wound not long after the battle. Cao Pi held a grand funeral for Zhang Liao.

Historicity

Zhang Liao's biography in the Sanguozhi stated that he died of illness. In 222, he participated in the Battle of Dongkou against Wu forces even though he was ill. When Sun Quan heard that Zhang Liao was involved in the battle, he warned his men to be careful. Zhang Liao and other Wei generals defeated the Wu general Lü Fan in that battle. However, Zhang Liao's condition worsened and he died later that year in Jiangdu (江都; present-day Jiangdu District, Yangzhou, Jiangsu).

== In popular culture ==
The battle is a playable stage in the seventh instalment of Koei's Dynasty Warriors video game franchise. The stage is the final stage of the Wu story mode, and the player uses Sun Quan, and Sun Quan kills Zhang Liao. In the stage, though Cao Pi surrenders, later the game reveals in a following Wu cinematic clip that Sun Quan was dreaming.
