= Battle of Quebei =

Conflict between Cao Wei and Eastern Wu (241)

- Part of the wars of the Three Kingdoms period
Date	April – July 241
Location	Shou County, Anhui, China
Result	Inconclusive

Belligerents
Cao Wei	Eastern Wu

Commanders and leaders
Wang Ling; Sun Li	Quan Cong; Zhuge Ke; Zhang Xiu; Gu Cheng

Battle of Quebei
- Traditional Chinese: 芍陂之役
- Simplified Chinese: 芍陂之役
Transcriptions
Standard Mandarin
- Hanyu Pinyin: Quèbēi Zhī Zhàn

The Battle of Quebei was a military offensive launched in 241 by the state of Eastern Wu against its rival state, Cao Wei, during the Three Kingdoms period of China. The campaign was initiated by Wu's founding emperor, Sun Quan, two years after the death of the second Wei emperor, Cao Rui. The campaign ended with an overall failure. Despite its name, Quebei being the location where most of the fighting took place, the campaign was actually a two-front attack and covered a wide area in Anhui and Hubei.

== Prelude ==
In the spring of 241, Sun Quan prepared to launch a campaign against Wei. Yin Zha (殷札), the administrator of Wu Commandery, advised Sun Quan to attack Wei in coordination with their ally state, Shu Han. According to Yin Zha's suggested plan, the Shu forces would attack Wei from the west of Chang'an, while the Wu forces would attack Wei from three directions: Zhuge Jin and Zhu Ran to attack Xiangyang; Lu Xun to attack Shouchun (壽春; present-day Shou County, Anhui); Sun Quan to attack the Huai River region and enter Xu Province. Yin Zha explained that this coordinated campaign would wear down Wei's defences because they were unable to fend off attacks on two fronts. However, Sun Quan did not follow his plan.

== The battle ==
Sometime between 28 April and 27 May, Wu forces attacked Wei at four different locations: Quan Cong attacked the Huai River region and clashed with Wei forces at Quebei (芍陂; south of present-day Shou County, Anhui); Zhuge Ke attacked Lu'an; Zhu Ran and Sun Lun (孫倫) attacked Fancheng (樊城; present-day Fancheng District, Xiangyang, Hubei); Zhuge Jin and Bu Zhi attacked Zhazhong (柤中; in present-day Xiangyang, Hubei).

Wang Ling and Sun Li led an army to resist Quan Cong at Quebei, defeating several Wu detachments. In an effort to prevent a total rout, Zhang Xiu and Gu Cheng led troops to intercept Wang Ling and managed to halt their advance. Taking an advantage of their progress, Quan Cong's eldest son Quan Xu (全緒) and relative Quan Duan (全端), who were also serving in the Wu army, led their troops to attack the Wei forces after they stopped advancing, and succeeded in driving them back. When Zhu Ran was defeated in the Battle of Fancheng by the Wei regent Sima Yi, Sun Quan ordered the complete withdrawal of the Wu army, forcing Zhuge Ke to retreat from Lu'an.

After the battle, when Sun Quan was giving rewards to the officers who participated in the battle, he deemed Zhang Xiu and Gu Cheng's contributions greater than those of Quan Xu and Quan Duan because he believed that it was more difficult to halt the enemy advance than to drive the enemy back. As a result, he promoted Zhang Xiu and Gu Cheng to the rank of general, while Quan Xu and Quan Duan were respectively promoted to lieutenant-general and major-general only. Due to this incident, the Quans bore a grudge against Gu Cheng and Zhang Xiu and, by extension, against Gu Cheng's brother Gu Tan as well.

== Aftermath ==
After successfully repelling the Wu invasion, the Wei imperial court wanted to promote agriculture and build up an abundant stockpile of food supplies in Yang and Yu provinces in preparation for a future campaign against Wu. Deng Ai was sent to survey the lands in the Huai River region from Chen Commandery (陳郡; around present-day Zhoukou, Henan) east to Shouchun, and he proposed constructing a series of canals to irrigate the lands. Sima Yi approved Deng Ai's plan. The project commenced in the following year and helped to resolve not only food shortages but also flooding problems once it was in place.

Two years later, in 243, Zhuge Ke sent spies to scout the strategic locations near Shouchun (壽春; present-day Shou County, Anhui) in preparation for an attack on Shouchun. In October 243, Sima Yi led troops from Luoyang to attack Zhuge Ke at Wan (皖; present-day Qianshan County, Anhui). When Sima Yi and the Wei army reached Shu County (舒縣; present-day Shucheng County, Anhui), Zhuge Ke gave orders to burn down all the supplies stockpiled in Wan, abandon the garrison and retreat. Sun Quan eventually reassigned Zhuge Ke to guard Chaisang Commandery (柴桑郡; near present-day Jiujiang, Jiangxi). Lü Ju, a son of the Wu veteran general Lü Fan, was also promoted to lieutenant-general (偏將軍) for his contributions in the campaign.

The Quans later found an opportunity to report Gu Cheng and Zhang Xiu for committing serious offences, claiming that they had secretly collaborated with the staff officer Chen Xun (陳恂) to make false submissions about their contributions during the battle. As a result, Gu Cheng and Zhang Xiu were imprisoned, while Gu Cheng's brother Gu Tan was implicated in the case because of his relationship with them. Sun Quan was reluctant to punish them but sought to appease the Quan clan, so he ordered Gu Tan to publicly apologise with the intention of pardoning the three men. However, Gu Tan refused to capitulate, stating: "Your Majesty, how can you let baseless accusations have their way?" An official accused Gu Tan of displaying great disrespect towards the emperor when he protested his innocence and lobbied to have him executed. Sun Quan took into consideration that Gu Tan's grandfather Gu Yong had rendered meritorious service in the past, and decided to have Gu Tan, Gu Cheng and Zhang Xiu exiled to Jiao Province instead. As the official Sun Hong had previously feuded with Zhang Xiu, he seized the opportunity to accuse him of further crimes, which resulted in Zhang Xiu being forced to commit suicide by imperial order.
