= Namyang Jegal clan =

Korean clan from Henan, China

- Country: Korea
- Current region: Henan
- Founder: Zhuge Gui
- Connected members: Jaegal Sung-yeol

The Namyang Jegal clan (Korean: 남양 제갈씨; Hanja: 南陽 諸葛氏) was a Korean clan (bon-gwan) descended from founders in Henan, China. According to research in 2000, the members of the Namyang Jegal clan numbered 4374. Namyang Jegal clan’s founder was Zhuge Gui who served as a Taesangunseung (Hanja: 泰山郡丞) at the end of the Han dynasty (taking office sometime between 229 and 241). Jegal Chung (Hanja: 諸葛忠), the 5th descendant of Zhuge Gui, did not like to govern Cao Wei, so he exiled himself to Silla during 13th king Michu of Silla’s reign and became the midway founder of the Namyang Jegal clan.

== See also ==
- Korean clan names of foreign origin
