= Battle of Jiangling =

Battle of Jiangling can refer to two battles in the Three Kingdoms period of China:

- Battle of Jiangling (208)
- Battle of Jiangling (223)
