= Battle of Fancheng (241) =

Conflict between Cao Wei and Eastern Wu (241)

- Part of the wars of the Three Kingdoms period
Date	April – July 241
Location	Fancheng and Xiangzhou districts, Xiangyang, Hubei, China
Result	Cao Wei victory

Belligerents
Cao Wei	Eastern Wu

Commanders and leaders
Sima Yi; Hu Zhi	Zhu Ran; Zhuge Jin

Strength
Unknown	100,000+

Casualties and losses
Unknown	10,000+

Battle of Fancheng
- Traditional Chinese: 樊城之戰
- Simplified Chinese: 樊城之战
Transcriptions
Standard Mandarin
- Hanyu Pinyin: Fánchéng Zhī Zhàn

The Battle of Fancheng was a military offensive launched in 241 by the state of Eastern Wu against its rival state, Cao Wei, during the Three Kingdoms period of China. The campaign was initiated by Wu's founding emperor, Sun Quan, two years after the death of the second Wei emperor, Cao Rui. The campaign ended with a decisive defeat for the Wu forces.

== Prelude ==
In the spring of 241, Sun Quan prepared to launch a campaign against Wei. Yin Zha (殷札), the administrator of Wu Commandery, advised Sun Quan to attack Wei in coordination with their ally state, Shu Han. According to Yin Zha's suggested plan, the Shu forces would attack Wei from the west of Chang'an, while the Wu forces would attack Wei from three directions: Zhuge Jin and Zhu Ran to attack Xiangyang; Lu Xun to attack Shouchun (壽春; present-day Shou County, Anhui); Sun Quan to attack the Huai River region and enter Xu Province. Yin Zha explained that this coordinated campaign would wear down Wei's defences because they were unable to fend off attacks on two fronts. However, Sun Quan did not follow this plan.

== The battle ==
Sometime between 28 April and 27 May, Wu forces attacked Wei at four different locations: Quan Cong attacked the Huai River region and clashed with Wei forces at Quebei (芍陂; south of present-day Shou County, Anhui); Zhuge Ke attacked Lu'an; Zhu Ran and Sun Lun (孫倫) attacked Fancheng (樊城; present-day Fancheng District, Xiangyang, Hubei); Zhuge Jin and Bu Zhi attacked Zhazhong (柤中; in present-day Xiangyang, Hubei).

In response to the Wu assault, Hu Zhi (胡質) led lightly armed forces from Jing Province to reinforce Fancheng. Someone warned Hu Zhi that the Wu forces attacking Fancheng had superiority in numbers and advised him to refrain from resisting them. However, Hu Zhi said, "The defences at Fancheng are weak. We should advance there to reinforce them, or else there will be big trouble." Having said that, he led his troops to Fancheng and restored stability in Fancheng.

Even after Hu Zhi reinforced Fancheng, the Wu forces did not withdraw from Jing Province. Sima Yi, the regent of Wei, heard about it and requested permission to lead troops to resist the enemy. However, there were some officials in the Wei imperial court who argued that there was no need to take swift action since Fancheng was strong enough to withstand attacks and that the enemy would be worn out after travelling a long distance. Sima Yi disagreed and pointed out that the Wu invasion posed a huge threat to Wei, because he knew that the loss of Fancheng would place Wei in a dangerous position. Between 26 June and 25 July, Sima Yi led an army from the Wei imperial capital, Luoyang, to fight the invaders. The Wei emperor Cao Fang personally saw them off at Luoyang's Jinyang Gate (津陽門). Upon reaching Fancheng, Sima Yi knew that he should not linger for too long because of the heat of summer. He then sent lightly armed cavalry to harass the Wu forces but his main army remained in position. Later, he ordered the troops to pretend as if they were going to attack, so as to scare the enemy away. The Wu forces fell for the ruse and retreated overnight. Sima Yi and the Wei forces pursued the retreating Wu forces to the intersection of the Han, Bai, and Tang rivers, where they defeated and killed over 10,000 enemy soldiers and captured their boats, equipment, and other resources.

== Aftermath ==
The Wei emperor Cao Fang sent a Palace Attendant (侍中) as an emissary to meet Sima Yi at Wan (宛; in present-day Nanyang, Henan) to congratulate him and host a banquet to celebrate the victory. In August 241, the Wei imperial court added two counties to Sima Yi's marquisate and enfeoffed 11 of his relatives as marquises as a reward for his contributions.

In Wu, Zhuge Jin died sometime between 26 July and 23 August. His second son, Zhuge Rong, inherited his father's marquisate and military appointment and was stationed at Gong'an County. Zhuge Jin's eldest son, Zhuge Ke, did not inherit his father's marquisate because he already had a marquisate of his own. Two years later, in 243, Zhuge Ke sent spies to scout the strategic locations near Shouchun (壽春; present-day Shou County, Anhui) in preparation for an attack on Shouchun. In October 243, Sima Yi led troops from Luoyang to attack Zhuge Ke at Wan (皖; present-day Qianshan County, Anhui). When Sima Yi and the Wei army reached Shu County (舒縣; present-day Shucheng County, Anhui), Zhuge Ke gave orders to burn down all the supplies stockpiled in Wan, abandon the garrison, and retreat. Sun Quan eventually reassigned Zhuge Ke to guard Chaisang Commandery (柴桑郡; near present-day Jiujiang, Jiangxi). Lü Ju, a son of the Wu veteran general Lü Fan, was also promoted to Lieutenant-General (偏將軍) for his contributions in the campaign.

After successfully repelling the Wu invasion, the Wei imperial court wanted to promote agriculture and build up an abundant stockpile of food supplies in Yang and Yu provinces in preparation for a future campaign against Wu. Deng Ai was sent to survey the lands in the Huai River region from Chen Commandery (陳郡; around present-day Zhoukou, Henan) east to Shouchun, and he proposed constructing a series of canals to irrigate the lands. Sima Yi approved Deng Ai's plan. The project commenced in the following year and helped to resolve not only food shortages but also flooding problems once it was in place.
