= Du Xi =

3rd-century Chinese adviser to warlord Cao Cao

- 杜襲

Palace Counsellor (太中大夫)
- In office ?–?
- Monarch: Cao Rui

Military Adviser to the General-in-Chief (大將軍軍師)
- In office 228 – 231? (Note: Du Xi's biography recorded that after Cao Zhen's death, he continued as Military Adviser under Sima Yi.)
- Monarch: Cao Rui

Master of Writing (尚書)
- In office ? – 227
- Monarch: Cao Pi

Imperial Secretary Supervising Military Supplies (督軍糧御史)
- In office 220 – ?
- Monarch: Cao Pi

Chief Clerk to the Imperial Chancellor (丞相長史)
- In office 216 – 220
- In office 215 – 216
- Monarch: Emperor Xian of Han
- Chancellor: Cao Cao

Chief Commandant of Escorting Cavalry (駙馬都尉)
- In office 216
- Monarch: Emperor Xian of Han
- Chancellor: Cao Cao

Personal details
- Born: Unknown Ye County, Henan
- Died: Unknown
- Children: Du Hui
- Occupation: General
- Courtesy name: Zixu (子緒)
- Posthumous name: Marquis Ding (定侯)
- Peerage: Marquis of Pingyang District (平陽鄉侯)

Du Xi (fl. 190–231), courtesy name Zixu, was an adviser to the warlord Cao Cao during the late Eastern Han dynasty of China. He was a subordinate of Cao Cao's general Xiahou Yuan. Du Xi proposed to the troops that Zhang He take command after Xiahou Yuan was killed at the Battle of Mount Dingjun. He continued serving as an official in the state of Cao Wei, established by Cao Cao's successor Cao Pi, during the Three Kingdoms period.

== Before joining Cao Cao ==
In the early 190s, (Note: Du Xi joined Cao Cao soon after he returned to his hometown, after Emperor Xian of Han was relocated to Xuchang in 196.) when Du Xi sought refuge at Jing Province, Liu Biao treated him like an honored guest; Liu Biao repeatedly praised Po Qin (繁钦), (Note: In vol.21 of his annotations of Sanguozhi, Pei Songzhi wrote that Qin's surname should be pronounced as "pó". (繁，音婆。)) who was with Du and was also from the same commandery as Du. Unwilling to serve Liu Biao, Du Xi then moved further south to Changsha Commandery. (Note: Zhao Yan's biography in Sanguozhi recorded that he was with Du and Po when they were at Jingzhou. Like Du Xi, Zhao and Po returned to their hometown after Emperor Xian was relocated to Xuchang in 196.)

== Anecdotes ==
When Cao Cao was still alive, Du Xi saw that Xiahou Shang was very close to Cao Pi, who had by then been confirmed as heir over his brother Cao Zhi. He informed Cao Cao that Xiahou was a "friend who would not be beneficial (to Cao Pi)" and should not be given such preferential treatment. When Cao Pi knew about Du's comments, he was greatly displeased.

Xiahou Shang married the younger sister of Cao Zhen. In his later years, Xiahou Shang took a concubine, whom he loved dearly. A family feud broke out when Xiahou Shang's concubine started fighting with Cao Zhen's sister to become Xiahou Shang's official spouse. When Cao Pi heard about it, he decided to intervene as a show of support for his fellow members of the Cao clan, so he had Xiahou Shang's concubine executed by strangulation.

Xiahou Shang was so upset by his concubine's death that he fell sick and his health started deteriorating. After burying his concubine, he stayed indoors all the time and refused to meet anyone. When Cao Pi heard about it, he remarked, "Maybe Du Xi had good reason(s) to look down on (Xiahou) Shang." Despite this incident, Cao Pi still highly favoured Xiahou Shang because he was a close childhood friend.

== Family ==
Du Xi's grandfather was Du Gen (杜根; fl.100-155), (Note: Du Gen has a biography in Book of the Later Han. He was nominated as xiaolian in 107, during the reign of Emperor An of Han, and his last known post was a short stint as Administrator of Jiyin Commandery during the reign of Emperor Shun. He died at home at the age of 78 (by East Asian reckoning).) son of Du An (杜安).

== See also ==
- Lists of people of the Three Kingdoms
