= Cao Pi's invasions of Eastern Wu =

Conflicts between states of Cao Wei and Eastern Wu (222-225)

- Part of the Three Kingdoms period
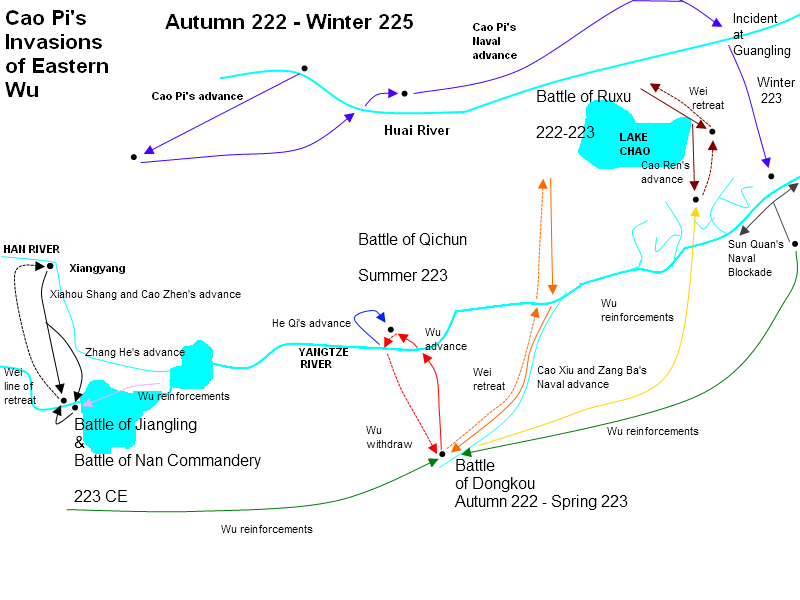
- A map showing the invasions (not drawn to scale)
| Date | September 222–225 |
| Location | Numerous location along the Yangtze River, Ruxu, Dongkou, and Jiangling |
| Result | Inconclusive |

Belligerents
| Cao Wei | Eastern Wu |

Commanders and leaders
| Cao Pi; Cao Ren: Wang Shuang; Cao Zhen: Xin Pi; Xu Huang; Zhang He; Xiahou Shang; Cao Xiu: Zang Ba; Zhang Liao | Sun Quan; Lü Fan: Sun Shao; Xu Sheng; He Qi Zhu Ran; Zhu Huan; Pan Zhang |

Strength
| 100,000+ | 50,000+ |

During the Three Kingdoms period of Chinese history, Cao Pi, the first emperor of the state of Cao Wei, invaded the rival state of Eastern Wu thrice during his reign between 222 and 225. The casus belli for the attack was the Wu leader Sun Quan's refusal to send his son Sun Deng as a hostage to the Wei court, under which Wu was a nominal vassal at the time. The invasions were separated into two parts. The first attack occurred in the years 222–224 before Cao Pi ordered total retreat. The second and last part was fought in 225.

== Background ==
After the Shu Han emperor Liu Bei was defeated by Sun Quan's forces at the Battle of Xiaoting, Sun benefited from his submission to Cao Pi, who would help him in the conflict against Liu Bei. However, on both sides, this was never a popular concept, especially in the ranks of Sun Quan, who had defeated Cao Cao at the Battle of Red Cliffs 14 years ago. To make matters worse, Sun Quan and his officers were uneasy about Sun's titles and ranks (such as King of Wu) because they were seen as a vassal state to Wei. It was even considered within Sun Quan's forces that the alliance with Wei was futile, because the defeat they caused Liu Bei at Xiaoting was so critical that it meant that their alliance with Wei was no longer necessary for survival. Sun Quan also appeared as if he was planning to maintain this alliance not much longer than was necessary.

In time, Cao Pi's plan to keep Sun Quan and Shu's relations sour backfired as Sun Quan and Liu Bei rekindled their alliance. In an attempt to improve his own relations with the Sun clan, he demanded Sun Deng (Sun Quan's eldest son) to be sent to the Wei capital Luoyang as a hostage. However, Sun Quan declined this request, and later apologized to Cao Pi, stating his son was still very young and vulnerable in his health to be away from his home and family. Cao Pi did not bring up or press the matter. However soon Cao Pi demanded Sun Deng as hostage again. This was also declined.

Diplomatic ties between the two continued to sour until finally, Cao Pi attacked Sun Quan. Sun Quan repeatedly sent envoys to negotiate peace between the two, but resulted in failure. Soon after, Sun Quan proceeded to declare independence in November 222.

== First, second, and third invasions: (222–223) ==
=== Dongkou ===
In the autumn of 222, Wei general Cao Xiu led a naval fleet down the Zijiang tributary river to the Yangtze onto the Wu stronghold at Dongkou, under the command of Wu general Lü Fan. The initial efforts of Wei were a success in battle against the Wu commander, but the Wu reinforcements led by Sun Shao and Xu Sheng managed to stalemate the naval attack. The battle concluded in late spring of 223.

=== Jiangling ===
Further west of the Yangtze, Wei generals Cao Zhen, Zhang He, and Xiahou Shang attacked two Wu positions in Jing Province from Xiangyang. Zhang He led the attack to overrun the outpost at Nan Commandery, successfully defeating Sun Sheng in the process. Cao Zhen and Xiahou Shang opened the siege of Jiangling, capital of Jing Province. Though the Wu forces there under control of Zhu Ran were not strong, the siege was put on hold when Wu reinforcements led by Pan Zhang and Zhuge Jin arrived. Eventually the Wei camp was plagued by a disease, thus forcing another retreat and another stalemate.

=== Ruxu ===
The third invasion was not directed at the region of Nanjing or the Jing Province, but closer to the Wu king Sun Quan. The late Wu general Gan Ning helped take the Wei outpost in Yang Province at Ruxu, at the mouth of the Ruxu River into the Yangtze therefore Cao Ren attacked Ruxu. However, the assault also ended in retreat when Cao Ren learned that the other two armies attacking Dongkou and Jiangling had withdrawn from their positions.

== Rebellion of Jin Zong ==
In the summer of 223, Wu general Jin Zong (晋宗) defected to Wei and moved to the new Wei outpost north of the Yangtze at Qichun. Wu general He Qi led the attack on Jin Zong, however, his forces decided to withdraw due to extremely hot weather conditions. He Qi managed to capture Jin Zong in the process.

== Fourth invasion: Incident at Guangling ==
The last invasion occurred in 225, though no fighting officially occurred. Cao Pi led more than 100,000 men and naval vessels towards Guangling, on the opposite side of the Yangtze River from Jianye (present-day Nanjing, Jiangsu). However, Wu had blockaded the river and the winter was harsh, causing the river to freeze; thus Cao Pi had a slim chance of success if he engaged in combat with Sun Quan. Looking at the unassailable barrier before his troops, he sighed, and ordered the withdrawal of his forces.
