= Zhu Ran =

Chinese Eastern Wu general (182–249 CE)

- 朱然

Right Military Adviser (右軍師)
- In office September or October 246 – March or April 249
- Monarch: Sun Quan

Left Grand Marshal (左大司馬)
- In office September or October 246 – March or April 249
- Monarch: Sun Quan

Right Protector of the Army (右護軍)
- In office 229 – September or October 246
- Monarch: Sun Quan

General of Chariots and Cavalry (車騎將軍)
- In office 229 – September or October 246
- Monarch: Sun Quan

General Who Attacks the North (征北將軍)
- In office 222 – 229
- Monarch: Sun Quan

Personal details
- Born: Shi Ran (施然); 182 Anji County, Zhejiang
- Died: March or April 249 (aged 66–67) (Note: Sun Quan's biography in the Sanguozhi recorded that Zhu Ran died in the 3rd month of the 12th year of the Chiwu era of Sun Quan's reign. This month corresponds to 31 March to 29 April 249 in the Gregorian calendar.)
- Children: Shi Ji
- Relatives: Zhu Zhi (maternal uncle); Zhu Cai (brother); Zhu Ji (brother); Zhu Wei (brother); Zhu Wan (brother)
- Occupation: Military general
- Courtesy name: Yifeng (義封)
- Peerage: Marquis of Dangyang (當陽侯)

Zhu Ran (朱然; 182 – March or April 249), born Shi Ran (施然), courtesy name Yifeng, was a military general of the state of Eastern Wu during the Three Kingdoms period of China.

A childhood friend of Wu's founding emperor, Sun Quan, he held several local and military appointments before Lü Meng's invasion of southern Jing Province in 219, wherein he assisted in capturing the enemy commander, Guan Yu. Following the Battle of Xiaoting, Wu's rival state, Cao Wei, launched a three-pronged strike on Wu's northwestern, middle, and eastern borders. Zhu Ran was sent to the northwestern border, where he defended the city of Jiangling with only 5,000 troops against an enemy force about ten times greater. He rose to fame and became feared throughout Wei. He then participated in a series of military operations against Wei, during which he defeated several enemy units, but the overall objectives were never met. Before his death, Zhu Ran was granted authority to oversee matters within the army.

== Early life ==
Originally from Guzhang County, Danyang Commandery (present-day Anji County, Huzhou), Zhu Ran was a maternal nephew of Zhu Zhi, who favoured his then 13-year-old nephew and asked his lord Sun Ce to grant him permission to adopt the child. Since Zhu Zhi had contributed considerably to Sun Ce's conquests in Jiangdong and had not bore a son, Sun Ce specifically ordered the Administrator of Danyang Commandery to bring presents to Zhu Ran's family for the ceremony and celebration. Thus, Zhu Ran became an adopted son of Zhu Zhi and had his family name changed from "Shi" to "Zhu". In addition, he studied together with Sun Ce's younger brother, Sun Quan, as a young boy, and the two became very intimate.

After Sun Ce died and was succeeded by Sun Quan, Zhu Ran was appointed as the Prefect of Yuyao County at the age of 19. Zhu Ran was later appointed as the Chief of Shanyin County, acting on authority of a Commandant, to oversee five local counties around the area. Pleased with his abilities, Sun Quan further promoted him to be the Administrator of Linchuan Commandery, and gave him command over 2,000 soldiers.

Zhu Ran was one of the few persons in Sanguozhi who was noted to be short; his biography indicated that he was less than seven chi tall.

== Capture of Guan Yu ==
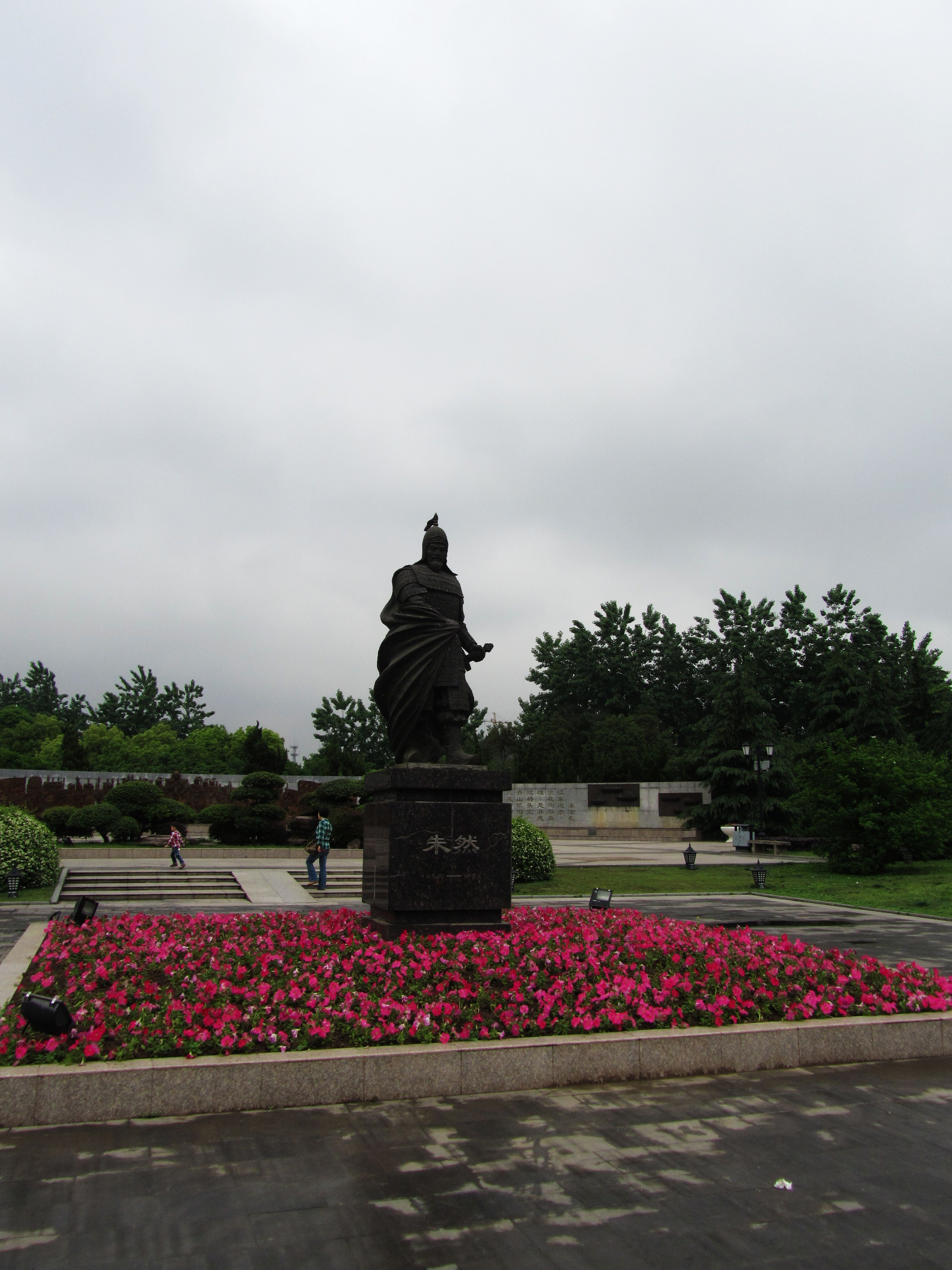
Statue of Zhu Ran in Ma'anshan

During his tenure as an commandery administrator, Zhu Ran had the merit of subjugating the Shanyue ethnic group within his jurisdiction, and was able to do so in less than a month. However, when the warlord Cao Cao led his massive army to invade southern China, Zhu Ran stayed in the back just as most other officials at the time did; and was not assigned significant tasks for some time until the Battle of Ruxukou, where he proved his loyalty in personally going to the frontline to help resist Cao Cao's 400,000 strong army. Although Zhu Ran did not engage the enemy in this battle, he was promoted by Sun Quan to the rank of Major-General, as a way to reaffirm his trust in Zhu Ran. In 219, Zhu Ran participated in Lü Meng's Jing Province campaign as Lü Meng's aide. When the enemy commander, Guan Yu, was abandoned by his troops and trapped in Maicheng, Zhu Ran and Pan Zhang were ordered by Sun Quan to block Guan Yu's escape route. Guan Yu and his son were subsequently captured by forces under Pan Zhang’s subordinate Ma Zhong. Regardless, Sun Quan credited both Pan Zhang and Zhu Ran for Guan Yu's capture. When Lü Meng laid on his death bed shortly after the Jing Province campaign, Sun Quan asked his input on who could succeed him as the new commander for the army, wherein Lü Meng highly praised the abilities of Zhu Ran and recommended the latter be the replacement. Heeding Lü Meng's dying words, Sun Quan gave the staff of authority to Zhu Ran, and tasked him with the defence of Jiangling County, the capital of Nan Commandery and a vital strategic stronghold on the frontline.

Two years later, Liu Bei, the emperor of Shu Han, led a grand army of more than 100,000 troops to invade Wu, and Zhu Ran led his 5,000 troops to join the Wu commander, Lu Xun, for the tactical defence of Yiling and Xiaoting. When the next summer came, Zhu Ran led a separate force against Shu. After breaking Liu Bei's vanguard, Zhu Ran's forces took up a position at the rear of the Shu army, blocking their escape as they attempted to flee from a fire attack executed by Lu Xun. Together, Lu Xun and Zhu Ran pursued Liu Bei into the deep hills, pushing him back to Baidicheng, where he would admit defeat and die shortly afterwards.

== Defence of Jiangling ==
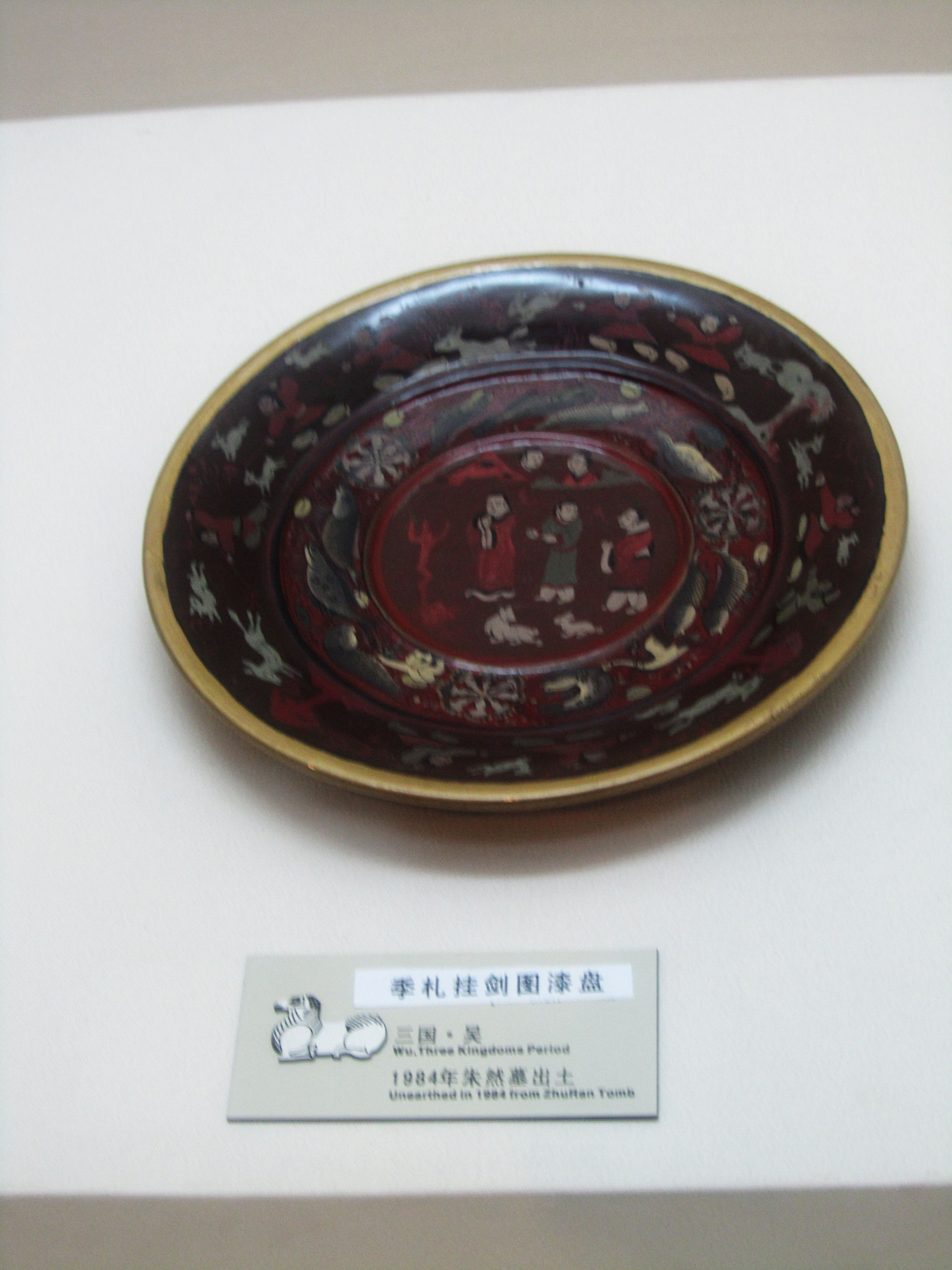
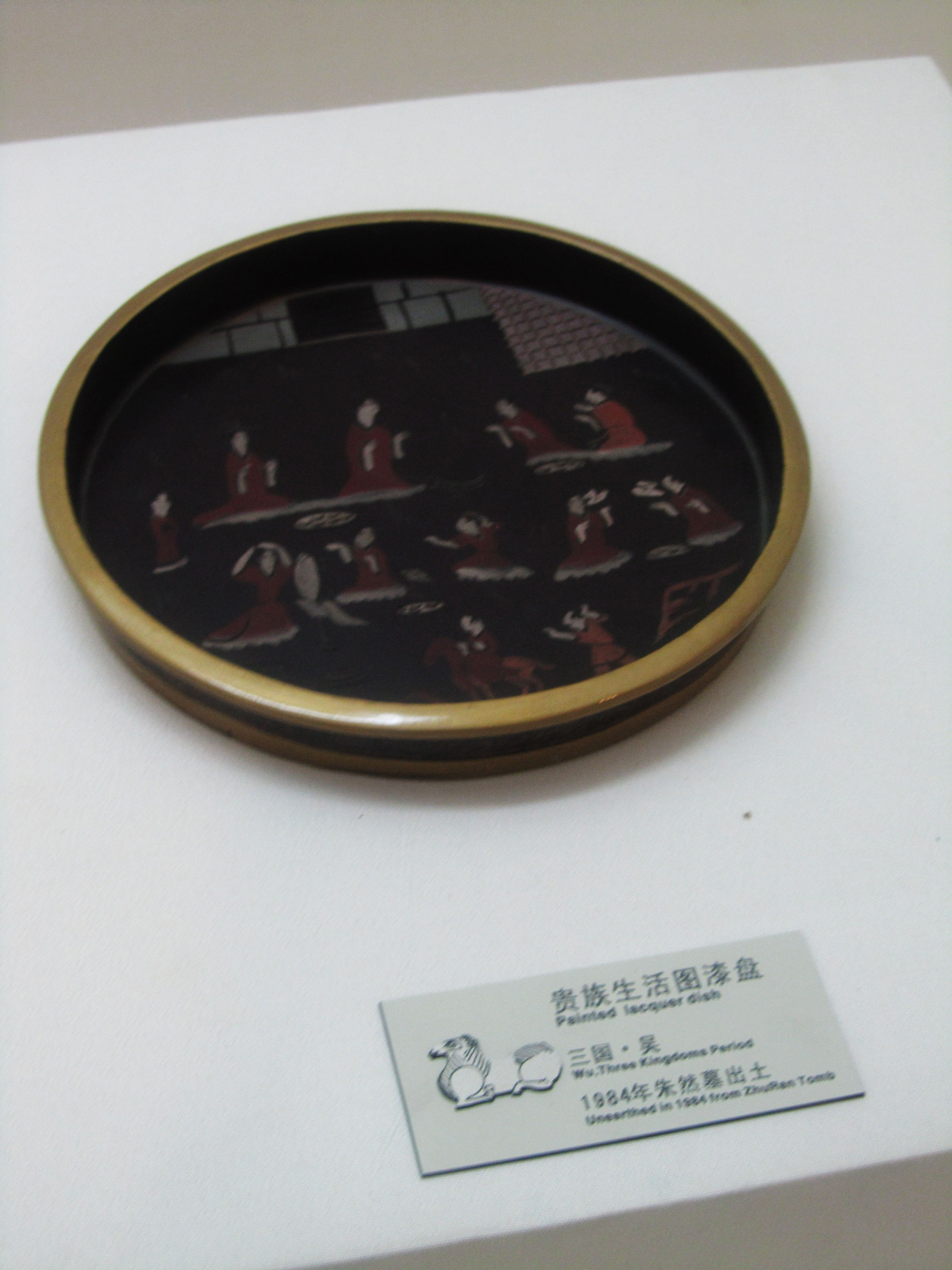
Painted lacquerware dishes from the tomb of Zhu Ran (182-249) in Anhui province, Eastern Wu period, showing figures wearing silk Hanfu attire

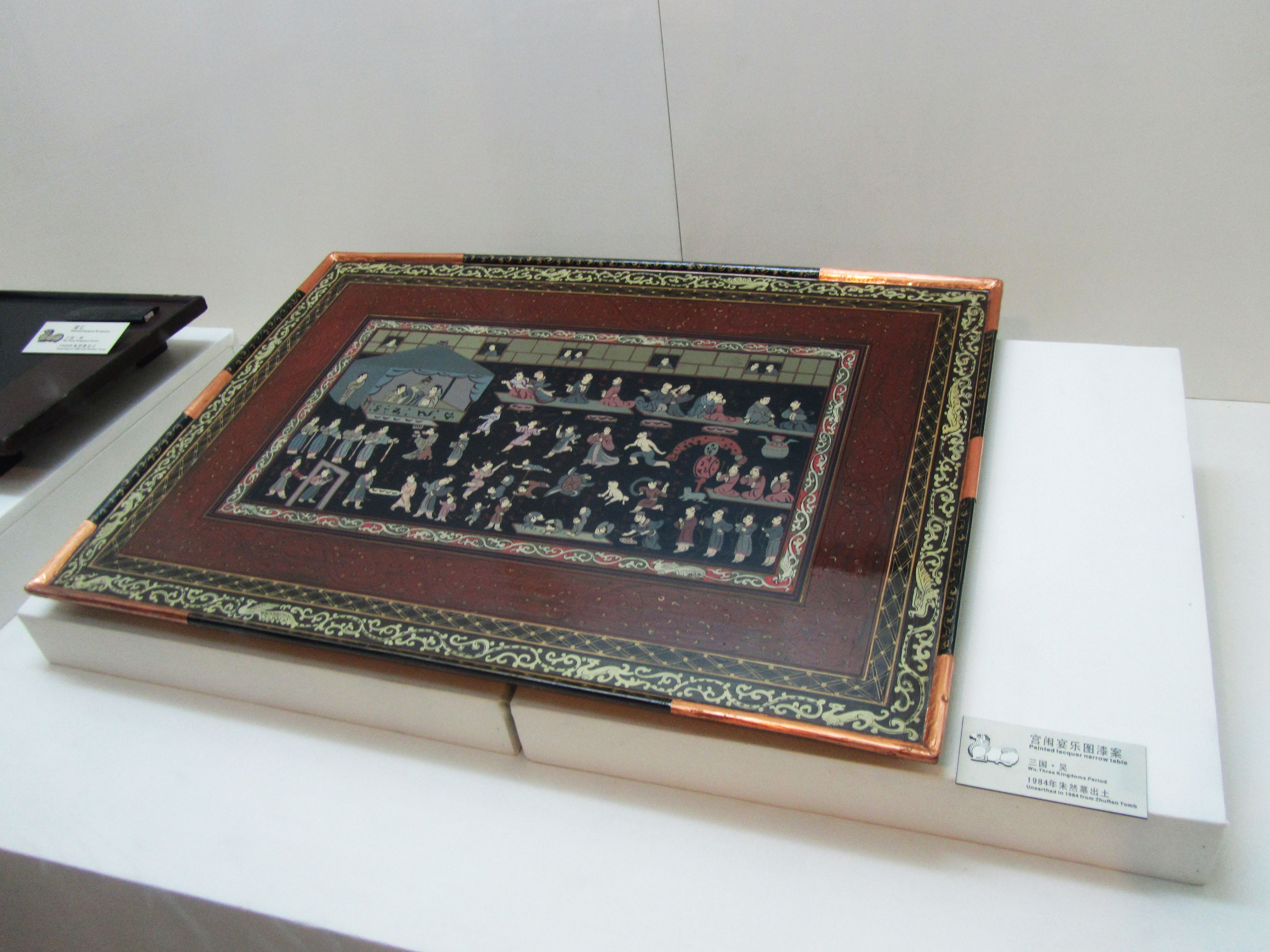
Painted lacquerware table from the tomb of Zhu Ran (182-249) in Anhui province, Eastern Wu period, showing figures wearing silk Hanfu attire

Throughout the whole course of the Wu-Shu conflict, the Wei military had assembled troops but never mobilised. However, immediately following the success of Lu Xun's battles against Shu, the Wei emperor Cao Pi suddenly launched a three-pronged campaign against Wu after Sun Quan refused to send his eldest son, Sun Deng, as a hostage. Even though Cao Pi's plan was detected by Lu Xun, who ordered Xu Sheng to perform a double-back to return to Wuchang (present-day Ezhou, Hubei) and informed Sun Quan to prepare for war, the Wu forces still faced a dire situation. Their troops were stretched thinly across at least four fronts; on the western front facing Baidicheng, where Liu Bei's declaration of war was still in effect; Nan Commandery (around present-day Jingzhou, Hubei), which was pressed by the Wei generals Zhang He, Xu Huang, Cao Zhen, and Xiahou Shang; at Ruxu (on the eastern side of Lake Chaohu in present-day Anhui), where the Wei general Cao Ren was leading his team to land on Zhongzhou; and at the eastern battlefield on the Yangtze, Dongkou (along the Yangtze near present-day Liyang, Jiangsu), where Zhang Liao and Zang Ba under the command of Cao Xiu defeated Lü Fan's navy. At the time, there was an extreme shortage of military personnel. Furthermore, an outbreak of disease greatly reduced the morale and number of soldiers in Zhu Ran's army, leaving him with only 5,000 men capable to do battles, who were intimidated by the news that the Wu reinforcements led by Sun Sheng (孫盛) were eliminated by Zhang He. At Jiangling County, Xiahou Shang had also built numerous pontoon bridges for his soldiers to cross the shallow waters and attack the castle. With each passing day, the number of Wei troops besieging the castle increased by the thousands. Not knowing how and where the Wei forces were crossing the shallows of the river, the Wu reinforcements under Pan Zhang and Zhuge Jin had no effective way to lift the siege.

Surrounded in his castle, Zhu Ran was heavily outnumbered by Cao Zhen, who encircled the fortress with several layers and deployed a variety of siege weapons. Yet Zhu Ran showed no signs of fear, and encouraged his comrades and subordinates to counter the enemy. When Cao Zhen relaxed his guard, Zhu Ran's forces were able to destroy two of the Wei encampments. Six months had passed; however, the Wei army still continued the siege, and Cao Pi had arrived at Wan city to bolster their morale. One of Zhu Ran's officers, seeing that the Wei troops were numerous and that the food supply within Jiangling was running out, planned to defect to Wei. He secretly contacted the Wei troops outside of the castle walls and promised to open the gate to permit their forces entry. When the betrayer was about to open the castle gate, he was noticed by Zhu Ran and executed. At the time, Pan Zhang had gone upstream and collected one million bundles of reeds. He fitted these to rafts and set them on fire, sending them downstream so that they would burn the pontoon bridges being used by Wei. Knowing what Pan Zhang had done, the Wei forces returned north before the retreat route could be destroyed. Because of his extraordinary performance in this battle, Zhu Ran's name became known throughout Wei as a powerful enemy general.

== Later life and death ==
In 241, Zhu Ran participated in a campaign against Wei and led an assault on Fancheng and surrounded it. However, the Wei army led by Sima Yi defeated him, and he retreated. In 246, he again invaded Wei and attacked Zuzhong (柤中), and when his escape route was cut off by Li Xing (李興) of Wei, he defeated Li Xing's forces and withdrew.

In March 245, Lu Xun died and Zhu Ran was given command over the armies of Wu by Sun Quan. He died four years later in 249. At his funeral service, Sun Quan was said to have wept greatly for him. His son, Shi Ji, succeeded him and continued to serve Eastern Wu.

== Legacy ==
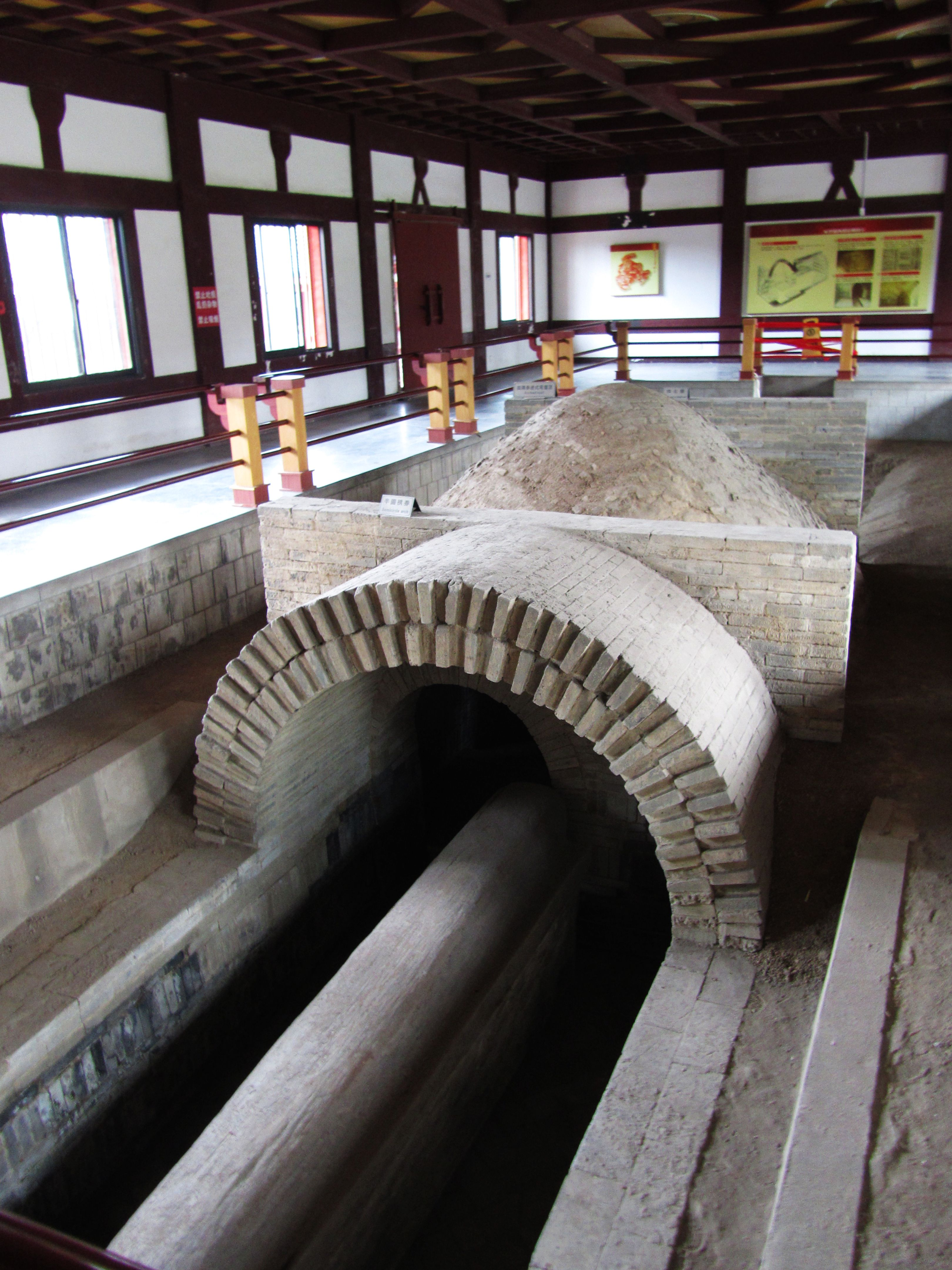
The tomb chamber

In June 1984, during the construction of a factory, Zhu Ran's burial site was discovered in Ma'anshan, Anhui. Many historically important decorative items of clothing and some of the world's oldest discovered lacquer were unearthed after being discovered within. The tomb had been underground for nearly 1,700 years. Although the tomb was raided, it was still home to over 140 valuable items. Most of the remaining buried items included mainly lacquered items made of wood, such as wooden plates, wooden clogs, and some wooden tables with educational stories and images drawn on them.

The road on which the site was discovered was renamed to "Zhuran Road" in his honour.

== In popular culture ==
=== Romance of the Three Kingdoms ===
Zhu Ran appears as a minor character in the 14th-century historical novel Romance of the Three Kingdoms, which romanticises the historical events before and during the Three Kingdoms period. In the novel, he is killed by Zhao Yun at the Battle of Xiaoting. (See Battle of Xiaoting#Zhao Yun killing Zhu Ran for details.)

=== Modern era depiction ===
Zhu Ran became a playable character in Koei's Dynasty Warriors 8: Xtreme Legends.

== See also ==
- Lists of people of the Three Kingdoms

== Appendix ==
=== Bibliography ===
- Chen, Shou (3rd century). Records of the Three Kingdoms (Sanguozhi).
- de Crespigny, Rafe (2007). A Biographical Dictionary of Later Han to the Three Kingdoms 23-220 AD. Leiden: Brill. ISBN 9789004156050.
- Luo, Guanzhong (14th century). Romance of the Three Kingdoms (Sanguo Yanyi).
- Pei, Songzhi (5th century). Annotated Records of the Three Kingdoms (Sanguozhi zhu).
- Sima, Guang (1084). Zizhi Tongjian.
