= Xiahou Shang =

State of Cao Wei general (died 226)

- 夏侯尚

Governor of Jing Province (荊州牧)
- In office 222 – 226
- Monarch: Cao Pi

Senior General Who Attacks the South (征南大將軍)
- In office 221 – 226
- Monarch: Cao Pi

Inspector of Jing Province (荊州刺史)
- In office 220 – 222
- Monarch: Cao Pi

General Who Attacks the South (征南將軍)
- In office 220 – 221
- Monarch: Cao Pi

Commandant of the Central Army (中領軍)
- In office 220
- Monarch: Emperor Xian of Han
- Chancellor: Cao Pi

Regular Mounted Attendant (散騎常侍)
- In office 220
- Monarch: Emperor Xian of Han
- Chancellor: Cao Pi

Personal details
- Born: Unknown
- Died: May or June 226 (Note: According to the Book of Jin, Xiahou Shang died in the 4th month of the 7th year of the Huangchu era of Cao Pi's reign. This corresponds to 14 May to 12 June 226 in the proleptic Gregorian calendar. de Crespigny (2007, p. 884) marks his death year as 225 without any elaboration; this was in accordance to Shang's biography in Sanguozhi which recorded that he fell gravely ill in that year. The biography did not explicitly indicate when Shang died.) Luoyang, Henan
- Spouse: Lady Cao
- Children: Xiahou Xuan; Empress Jinghuai; He Qiao's wife
- Relatives: Cao Shuang (nephew)
- Occupation: Military general, politician
- Courtesy name: Boren (伯仁)
- Posthumous name: Marquis Dao (悼侯)
- Peerage: Marquis of Changling District (昌陵鄉侯)

Xiahou Shang (died May or June 226), courtesy name Boren, was a Chinese military general and politician of the state of Cao Wei during the Three Kingdoms period of China. He was a distant younger relative of Xiahou Yuan and a close friend of Cao Pi, the first emperor of the Cao Wei state.

== Early life ==
Xiahou Shang was a distant younger relative of Xiahou Yuan and Xiahou Dun, generals who served under Cao Cao, the warlord who rose to power in the late Eastern Han dynasty and laid the foundation for the Cao Wei state in the Three Kingdoms period. As a youth, he was already known for being well-versed in planning and strategy. Cao Pi, one of Cao Cao's sons, highly regarded Xiahou Shang and treated him as a close friend.

== Service under Cao Cao ==
In the 200s, when Cao Cao was at war with his rival Yuan Shao for control over northern China, Xiahou Shang served as a major (司馬) in Cao Cao's army and led cavalry forces into battle against Yuan Shao and his heirs. In 211, after Cao Pi was appointed General of the Household for All Purposes (五官中郎將) in the Han imperial court, Xiahou Shang served as a wenxue (文學; an officer of writings) under him. In 213, after Emperor Xian, the figurehead emperor of the Han Empire, enfeoffed Cao Cao as the Duke of Wei (魏公), Xiahou Shang was reassigned to be a Gentleman of the Yellow Gate (黃門侍郎) in Cao Cao's dukedom. In 216, Emperor Xian elevated Cao Cao from the status of a duke to a vassal king under the title "King of Wei" (魏王).

When the Wuchendi (無臣氐) branch of the Wuhuan tribes started a rebellion in Dai Commandery (代郡; around present-day Yu County, Hebei) and Shanggu Commandery (上谷郡; around present-day Beijing) in May 218, Cao Cao ordered his son Cao Zhang to lead forces to quell the revolt. During this time, Xiahou Shang served as an army adviser (參軍) under Cao Zhang and assisted him in defeating the Wuchendi.

== Service under Cao Pi ==
In March 220, after Cao Cao died in Luoyang, Xiahou Shang received orders to lead the convoy escorting Cao Cao's coffin back to Ye (鄴; in present-day Handan, Hebei), the capital of the vassal Kingdom of Wei, for a proper funeral and burial. Cao Pi, as Cao Cao's heir apparent, succeeded his father as the King of Wei and Imperial Chancellor of the Han Empire. He first appointed Xiahou Shang as a Regular Mounted Attendant and later promoted him to Commandant of the Central Army (中領軍). As a reward for Xiahou Shang's contributions, Cao Pi also enfeoffed him as the Marquis of Pingling Village (平陵亭侯).

In late 220, Cao Pi usurped the throne from Emperor Xian, ended the Eastern Han dynasty, and established the Cao Wei state with himself as the new emperor. After his coronation, he elevated Xiahou Shang from a village marquis to a district marquis under the title "Marquis of Pingling District" (平陵鄉侯). Xiahou Shang was also appointed as General Who Attacks the South (征南將軍) and Inspector (刺史) of Jing Province, and put in charge of supervising military affairs in the southern frontiers of Wei.

=== Battle of Shangyong ===
During this time, Xiahou Shang proposed to Cao Pi to launch an attack on Shangyong Commandery (上庸郡; around present-day Zhushan County, Hubei), which was a territory of Cao Pi's rival Liu Bei. Cao Pi approved and ordered him and Xu Huang to lead troops to attack Shangyong Commandery. Xiahou Shang achieved success in his mission and pacified a total of three commanderies and nine counties. Cao Pi promoted him to Senior General Who Attacks the South (征南大將軍) in recognition of his achievements.

=== Battle of Jiangling ===
Sun Quan, another rival of Cao Pi, initially pledged allegiance to the Cao Wei state after Cao Pi became emperor in late 220. Cao Pi was so pleased that he awarded Sun Quan the title of a vassal king, "King of Wu" (吳王), and recognised Sun Quan's claim to the territories in the Jiangdong region and southern Jing Province. Xiahou Shang knew that Sun Quan was only pretending to submit to Wei rule so he urged Cao Pi to maintain his guard against Sun Quan. As Xiahou Shang foresaw, Sun Quan broke ties with Cao Pi in 222 and declared himself the emperor of an independent Eastern Wu (or simply Wu) regime.

In 222, Cao Pi retaliated against Sun Quan by launching the first of a series of campaigns against Wu. He ordered Xiahou Shang, Cao Zhen and others to lead troops to attack Jiangling (江陵; present-day Jiangling County, Hubei), which was defended by the Wu general Zhu Ran, while he was stationed at Wan (宛; in present-day Nanyang, Henan) to provide backup. Sun Quan ordered his general Zhuge Jin to attack Xiahou Shang. Zhuge Jin deployed his naval forces across different locations in the river. That night, Xiahou Shang ordered some 10,000 troops to split up and board smaller boats to cross the river and launch a stealth attack on Zhuge Jin on both land and water. They scored a major victory over Zhuge Jin as they burnt down the Wu ships and destroyed some Wu camps on the opposite bank of the river. In 223, when an epidemic broke out while Wei forces were laying siege to Jiangling, Cao Pi ordered the Wei forces to pull back, thus bringing an end to the campaign. As a reward for Xiahou Shang's contributions during the campaign, Cao Pi awarded him an additional 600 taxable households in his marquisate, bringing the total number up to 1,900. He also gave Xiahou Shang a ceremonial axe and promoted him to Governor (牧) of Jing Province.

When Xiahou Shang assumed governorship of (northern) Jing Province, the lands were barren and infrastructure was in ruins after years of war. Most of the population have migrated to the lands south of the Han River which were Wu territory. Besides, there were various non-Han Chinese tribes living around Jing Province who occasionally started uprisings and caused trouble for the regional government. After conquering Shangyong Commandery (上庸郡; around present-day Zhushan County, Hubei) in 221, Xiahou Shang used it as a bridge to establish contact with the non-Han Chinese tribes living in the lands 700 li to the west and succeeded in pacifying them and gaining their support. Within five to six years, thousands of households pledged allegiance to Wei. In 224, Cao Pi changed Xiahou Shang's marquis title to "Marquis of Changling District" (昌陵鄉侯).

=== Family feud ===
Xiahou Shang married the younger sister of Cao Zhen, an adopted son of Cao Cao and a close childhood friend of Cao Pi. In his later years, Xiahou Shang took a concubine, whom he loved dearly. A family feud broke out when Xiahou Shang's concubine started fighting with Cao Zhen's sister to become Xiahou Shang's official spouse. When Cao Pi heard about it, he decided to intervene as a show of support for his fellow members of the Cao clan, so he had Xiahou Shang's concubine executed by strangulation.

Xiahou Shang was so upset by his concubine's death that he fell sick and his health started deteriorating. After burying his concubine, he stayed indoors all the time and refused to meet anyone. When Cao Pi heard about it, he remarked, "Maybe Du Xi had good reason(s) to look down on (Xiahou) Shang." (Note: When Cao Cao was still alive, Du Xi saw that Xiahou Shang was very close to Cao Pi, who had by then been confirmed as heir over his brother Cao Zhi. He informed Cao Cao that Xiahou was a "friend who would not be beneficial (to Cao Pi)" and should not be given such preferential treatment. When Cao Pi knew about Du's comments, he was greatly displeased.) Despite this incident, Cao Pi still highly favoured Xiahou Shang because he was a close childhood friend.

== Death ==
In 225, when Xiahou Shang became critically ill, he had to be sent back to the Wei imperial capital, Luoyang, from his post in Jing Province. During this time, Cao Pi personally visited him, held his hand and sobbed with grief. Xiahou Shang died about a year later. Cao Pi honoured him with the posthumous title "Marquis Dao" (悼侯) and wrote an official eulogy for him: "(Xiahou) Shang had been a close companion to me since my childhood. He was loyal, sincere and faithful. Although we did not have the same parents, we were as close as brothers. He was like my stomach and heart, and like claws and teeth to me. He was intelligent, perceptive and exceptionally brilliant. It is a pity that his life ended so early. Alas, such is life! I hereby grant him the posthumous appointment of Senior General Who Attacks the South and award him the seal of the Marquis of Changling."

== Family ==
Xiahou Shang married Cao Zhen's younger sister, whose personal name is unknown; she was referred to as the Lady of Deyang District (德陽鄉主). They had a son, Xiahou Xuan, and a daughter, Xiahou Hui. Xiahou Xuan inherited his father's peerage and marquisate as the Marquis of Changling (昌陵侯). Cao Pi removed 300 taxable households from the marquisate and awarded it to Xiahou Feng (夏侯奉), a nephew of Xiahou Shang who was enfeoffed as a Secondary Marquis (關內侯).

Xiahou Shang had another daughter who married He You (和逌), He Qia's son, and was the mother of He Jiao (和嶠).

Xiahou Shang also had a younger cousin Xiahou Ru (夏侯儒), according to the Weilüe, who served as a military officer in Cao Wei under Zhang Ji (張既).

== In Romance of the Three Kingdoms ==
Xiahou Shang is a minor character in the 14th-century historical novel Romance of the Three Kingdoms, which romanticises the historical figures and events before and during the Three Kingdoms period. He participates in the Battle of Mount Dingjun as a subordinate of Xiahou Yuan against Liu Bei's forces. During a skirmish, he is captured by the enemy and but is later released in exchange for the enemy officer Chen Shi, who was captured by Xiahou Yuan. During the exchange, Huang Zhong fires an arrow at him, which hits him in the back and seriously injures him.

== See also ==
- Lists of people of the Three Kingdoms
