= Cao Xiu =

State of Cao Wei general (died 228)

- 曹休

Grand Marshal (大司馬)
- In office January or February 227 – 228
- Monarch: Cao Rui

Governor of Yang Province (揚州牧)
- In office 223 – January or February 227
- Monarch: Cao Pi

Senior General Who Attacks the East (征東大將軍)
- In office 222 – 223
- Monarch: Cao Pi

General Who Attacks the East (征東將軍)
- In office 221 – 222
- Monarch: Cao Pi

Inspector of Yang Province (揚州刺史)
- In office 221 – 222
- Monarch: Cao Pi

General Who Guards the South (鎮南將軍)
- In office 220 – 221
- Monarch: Cao Pi

General Who Leads the Army (領軍將軍)
- In office 220
- Monarch: Cao Pi

Commandant of the Central Army (中領軍)
- In office 219 – 220
- Monarch: Emperor Xian of Han
- Chancellor: Cao Cao

Cavalry Commandant (騎都尉)
- In office 217 – 219
- Monarch: Emperor Xian of Han
- Chancellor: Cao Cao

Personal details
- Born: late 170s (Note: Analysis of Cao Xiu's bones indicate that he was around 50 when he died.)
- Died: 28 November 228 (Note: Cao Rui's biography in the Sanguozhi recorded that Cao Xiu died on the gengzi day of the 9th month of the 2nd year of the Taihe era of Cao Rui's reign. However, no corresponding date exists in the Julian calendar because there was no gengzi day in the 9th month of that year. The nearest gengzi days were 29 September 228 (gengzi day of the 8th month) and 28 November 228 (gengzi day of the 10th month). Sun Quan's biography in the Sanguozhi also recorded that Lu Xun defeated Cao Xiu at Shi'ting in the 8th month of the 7th year of the Huangwu era of his reign. This corresponds to 17 Sep to 15 Oct 228 in the Julian calendar. Vol.71 of Zizhi Tongjian recorded that Cao Xiu died on the gengzi day after the 9th month.)
- Resting place: Mengjin County, Henan
- Height: 171 cm (5 ft 7 in)
- Children: Cao Zhao; Cao Cuan
- Occupation: Military general
- Courtesy name: Wenlie (文烈)
- Posthumous name: Marquis Zhuang (壯侯)
- Peerage: Marquis of Changping (長平侯)

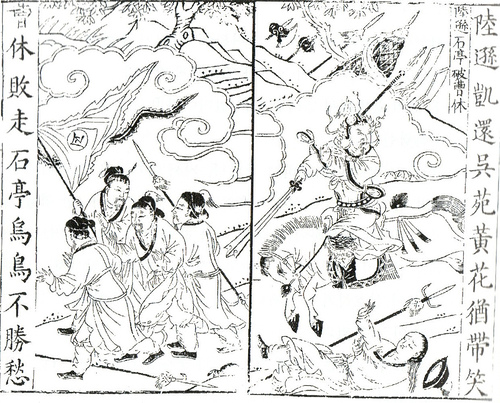

Cao Xiu (died 28 November 228), courtesy name Wenlie, was a Chinese military general of the state of Cao Wei in the Three Kingdoms period of China. A distant younger relative of the warlord Cao Cao, Cao Xiu started his career in the late Eastern Han dynasty as a military officer under Cao Cao. In the early stages of the Hanzhong Campaign of 217–219, he outwitted Zhang Fei and defeated his subordinate officer Wu Lan (吳蘭). Later in his career, he became a provincial-level military commander and fought in various battles against Wei's rival state, Eastern Wu. He died in 228 shortly after the Wei defeat at the Battle of Shiting.

== Early life ==
Cao Xiu was a distant younger relative of Cao Cao. When the Yellow Turban Rebellion broke out in the late Eastern Han dynasty, the Cao clan left their ancestral home in Qiao County (譙縣; present-day Bozhou, Anhui) and went in different directions throughout the Han Empire to avoid getting caught up in the chaos.

When Cao Xiu was around 10 years old, his father died and he only had one person to help him arrange for his father to be properly buried. Cao Xiu and his mother crossed the Yangtze to southern China and settled down in Wu Commandery (around present-day Suzhou, Jiangsu). Cao Xiu's grandfather, Cao Chang (曹嘗), had previously served as the Administrator of Wu Commandery. One day, after seeing a portrait of his grandfather in the Administrator's office, Cao Xiu became so overwhelmed by emotions that he knelt down and cried. Everyone present at the scene felt touched when they saw him crying.

== Service under Cao Cao ==
In 190, Cao Cao was raising an army to join the Guandong Coalition against the warlord Dong Zhuo, who controlled the Han central government and held Emperor Xian hostage. When Cao Xiu heard about it, he adopted a fake identity and travelled via Jing Province to Cao Cao's base in Chenliu Commandery (陳留郡; around present-day Kaifeng, Henan). Cao Cao was pleased to see him and he remarked, "This is the thousand-li horse of my clan."

Cao Cao treated Cao Xiu like a son and even allowed him to live with his own son, Cao Pi. Cao Xiu fought on Cao Cao's side in the various battles against rival warlords throughout the late Eastern Han dynasty. He was also one of the commanders of the elite "Tiger and Leopard Cavalry" (虎豹騎) unit in Cao Cao's army.

=== Hanzhong Campaign ===
In 217, Cao Cao's rival Liu Bei launched a campaign to seize control of Hanzhong Commandery, which was guarded by Cao Cao's general Xiahou Yuan. When Liu Bei sent Wu Lan (吳蘭), one of his officers, to lead troops to garrison at Xiabian County (下辯縣; northwest of present-day Cheng County, Gansu), Cao Cao ordered his cousin Cao Hong to lead an army to attack the enemy. Cao Xiu was commissioned as a Cavalry Commandant (騎都尉) to serve as an adviser to Cao Hong. Before they left, Cao Cao told Cao Xiu, "You may be an adviser, but you're actually the commander." When Cao Hong received the order, he delegated his command to Cao Xiu.

Liu Bei later sent his generals Ma Chao and Zhang Fei to lead troops to Gushan (固山) and station there in an attempt to cut off Cao Hong's retreat route. Cao Hong and the other generals were hesitant and unsure about what to do next. However, Cao Xiu concluded that this was merely a ruse, stating, "The enemy's real intention in cutting off the road is to ambush and advance stealthily. Now they are making a show of force first, which they cannot do." He then suggested to Cao Hong to attack Wu Lan at Xiabian County before he could link up with Ma Chao and Zhang Fei, and said that Ma Chao and Zhang Fei would retreat once they learn of Wu Lan's defeat. Cao Hong heeded his suggestion and defeated Wu Lan at Xiabian County. As Cao Xiu foresaw, Ma Chao and Zhang Fei gave up on the planned ambush and pulled back their troops from Gushan after hearing of Wu Lan's defeat.

In 219, after a prolonged war against Liu Bei, Cao Cao eventually lost Hanzhong Commandery so he ordered his troops to retreat and return to Chang'an. Later, he appointed Cao Xiu as Commandant of the Central Army (中領軍).

== Service under Cao Pi ==
Following Cao Cao's death in March 220, his son Cao Pi succeeded him as the (vassal) King of Wei (魏王) and Imperial Chancellor (丞相) of the Eastern Han dynasty. Cao Pi appointed Cao Xiu as General Who Leads the Army (領軍將軍) and enfeoffed him as the Marquis of Dongyang Village (東陽亭侯) in recognition of his past achievements. When Xiahou Dun died in June 220, Cao Pi ordered Cao Xiu to replace Xiahou Dun as the supervisor of all military operations, promoted him to General Who Guards the South (鎮南將軍) and granted him acting imperial authority. He held Cao Xiu's hands while personally seeing him off.

At the time, Cao Pi's rival Sun Quan had sent his forces to garrison at Liyang County (歷陽縣; present-day He County, Anhui) in preparation for an attack on Cao Pi's territories. When Cao Xiu reached his assigned position at Zhaoling County (召陵縣; east of present-day Luohe, Henan), he led his troops to attack Liyang County and succeeded in driving Sun Quan's forces away. Later, he sent his troops to cross the Yangtze and attack and burn down a few thousand enemy camps at Wuhu County (蕪湖縣; east of present-day Wuhu, Anhui).

In late 220, Cao Pi usurped the throne from Emperor Xian, ended the Eastern Han dynasty, and established the state of Cao Wei with himself assuming the title of emperor. After his coronation, he promoted Cao Xiu to General Who Attacks the East (征東將軍) and appointed him as the Inspector (刺史) of Yang Province. He also elevated Cao Xiu from the status of a village marquis to a district marquis under the title "Marquis of Anyang District" (安陽鄉侯).

=== Death of Cao Xiu's mother ===
When Cao Xiu's mother died, Cao Pi issued an imperial decree to exempt Cao Xiu from the formalities and austere lifestyle of filial mourning, which was customary for officeholders when their parent(s) died. He excused Cao Xiu from wearing mourning garments and gave him permission to consume meat and alcohol. However, when Cao Xiu's health deteriorated due to grief and his desire to return home to Qiao County (譙縣; present-day Bozhou, Anhui) to hold a proper funeral for his mother, Cao Pi approved and sent Xue Qiao (薛喬) as his personal representative to offer his condolences to Cao Xiu and attend the funeral. Cao Xiu settled the funeral arrangements and had his mother properly buried within one day, after which he wanted to return to his post. Before Cao Xiu left, Cao Pi met him in person to comfort and console him. This incident showed how close Cao Pi was to Cao Xiu and how highly he regarded Cao Xiu.

=== Battle of Dongkou ===
In October 222, Cao Pi launched the first of a series of invasions against Eastern Wu, the state founded by his rival, Sun Quan. He promoted Cao Xiu to Senior General Who Attacks the East (征東大將軍), granted him the yellow axe (a ceremonial axe given to newly appointed high-ranking generals), and ordered him, Zhang Liao and others to lead 20 armies to attack Dongkou (洞口; in present-day southern Jiangsu), where they dealt heavy losses to Wu forces led by Lü Fan before having to retreat. Cao Pi later promoted Cao Xiu to Governor of Yang Province.

== Service under Cao Rui ==
After Cao Pi died in June 226, Cao Xiu continued serving under Cao Rui, Cao Pi's son and successor as the emperor of Wei. Following his coronation, Cao Rui elevated Cao Xiu from the status of a district marquis to a county marquis under the title "Marquis of Changping" (長平侯).

When Wu forces led by Shen De (審悳) garrisoned at Wan (皖; present-day Qianshan County, Anhui), Cao Xiu led Wei forces to attack them and killed Shen De in battle. Two other Wu officers, Han Zong and Zhai Dan (翟丹), brought along their troops and surrendered to Cao Xiu. In recognition of Cao Xiu's achievements, Cao Rui increased the number of taxable households in Cao Xiu's marquisate by 400, bringing the total number to 2,500. Cao Rui also promoted Cao Xiu to Grand Marshal (大司馬) and ordered him to continue supervising military operations in Yang Province.

=== Battle of Shi'ting ===
In 228, as Cao Rui planned to launch an invasion on Wei's rival state Wu, he ordered Sima Yi to lead Wei forces from Jing Province and sail down the Han River to Xunyang County (尋陽縣; southwest of present-day Huangmei County, Hubei) and supervise the invasion. During this time, Cao Xiu fell for a ruse by a Wu military officer Zhou Fang, who pretended to defect to Wei in order to lure Wei forces into a trap. He led his troops deep into enemy territory and suffered a disastrous defeat when they fell into the trap. Cao Xiu managed to retreat to Shiting (石亭; or Shi Village, in present-day Qianshan County, Anhui), but his soldiers started panicking at night and many of them deserted and left behind their weapons, armour and equipment.

Cao Xiu wrote a memorial to Cao Rui to apologise for his blunder and request to be punished. However, Cao Rui not only pardoned him, but also sent Yang Ji (楊曁) as an emissary to console him and continued to regard him as highly as before.

=== Death ===
Cao Xiu died later in 228 from skin infections on his back resulting from the wounds he sustained during the Battle of Shiting. Cao Rui honoured with the posthumous title "Marquis Zhuang" (壯侯), which literally means "robust marquis".

== Descendants ==
Cao Xiu's son, Cao Zhao (曹肇), whose courtesy name was Changsi (長思), inherited his father's peerage and marquisate as the Marquis of Changping (長平侯). Cao Zhao, who was known for being talented and generous, served as a Regular Mounted Attendant (散騎常侍) and Colonel of the Garrison Cavalry (屯騎校尉) in the Cao Wei state. One source claimed that Cao Zhao was greatly favoured by Cao Rui, to the extent that once, after winning a bet with clothes as the wager, Zhao went into Rui's chamber to put on the latter's clothes and leave. When Cao Rui became critically ill in 238, he wanted to appoint Cao Zhao and Cao Yu as the regents for Cao Fang, his adopted son and successor-to-be. However, later he changed his mind and ordered Cao Zhao to retire and go home. Cao Zhao died in the middle of the Zhengshi era (240–249) of Cao Fang's reign. He was posthumously awarded the appointment General of the Guards (衞將軍). His son, Cao Xing (曹興), succeeded him as the next Marquis of Changping.

Cao Xiu had another son, Cao Cuan (曹纂), whose courtesy name was Desi (德思), and was younger than Cao Zhao. Cao Cuan was said to be very strong. Sometime between 220 and 226, Cao Pi removed 300 taxable households from Cao Xiu's marquisate and used them to create a new marquisate for Cao Cuan. Like his father and elder brother, Cao Cuan served in the Cao Wei state and held the position General Who Destroys Wu (殄吳將軍). One source claimed that Cuan, instead of his elder brother, was the one greatly favoured by Cao Rui. After his death, he was posthumously awarded the appointment General of the Vanguard (前將軍).

Cao Xiu had a great-grandson, Cao Shu (曹攄), (Note: Cao Shu has a biography in Volume 90 of the Book of Jin.) whose courtesy name was Yanyuan (顏遠) and was a grandson of Cao Zhao. Cao Shu was known for being virtuous, ambitious, knowledgeable and well-read since young. He served under the Western Jin after the fall of Cao Wei in February 266, and gained quite a reputation during his tenure as the Prefect of Luoyang. When Sima Jiong was regent for Emperor Hui, Cao Shu and Zuo Si served as his subordinates. Cao Shu later rose through the ranks from a Palace Gentleman (中郎) to the positions of Administrator of Xiangyang (襄陽太守) and Marshal Who Attacks the South (征南司馬). He was killed in battle in 308 while suppressing a rebellion.

== Tomb ==
In May 2010, archaeologists announced the discovery of Cao Xiu's tomb in Mengjin County, Henan. The tomb, 50 metres long and 21 metres wide, held chinaware, copperware, liquor cups and jars as well as some human bones. Tests suggested that these bones belonged to a 50-year-old man and a 40-year-old woman, and the man was about 1.71 metres tall. A bronze seal, about the size of a coin and engraved with Cao Xiu's name, revealed the tomb owner's identity.

== In Romance of the Three Kingdoms ==
In the 14th-century historical novel Romance of the Three Kingdoms, on one occasion when Yue Jin was losing to the enemy general Ling Tong in a duel, Cao Xiu fired an arrow which hit Ling Tong's horse. Ling Tong fell from the horse's back and would have been killed by Yue Jin if Gan Ning had not intervened and saved him.

== See also ==
- Lists of people of the Three Kingdoms
