= Cao Zhen =

State of Cao Wei general (died 231)

- 曹真
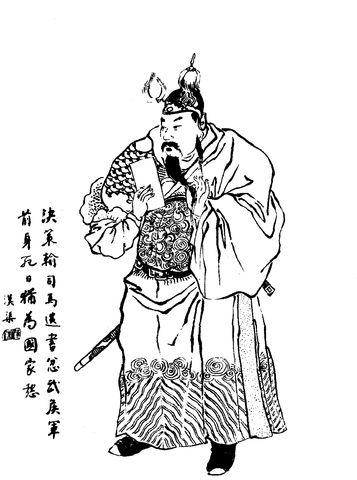
- A Qing dynasty illustration of Cao Zhen

Grand Marshal (大司馬)
- In office 16 March 230 – April or May 231
- Monarch: Cao Rui

General-in-Chief (大將軍)
- In office January or February 227 – 16 March 230
- Monarch: Cao Rui
- Succeeded by: Sima Yi

Senior General of the Central Army (中軍大將軍)
- In office 222 – January or February 227
- Monarch: Cao Pi

Senior General of the Upper Army (上軍大將軍)
- In office 222
- Monarch: Cao Pi

General Who Guards the West (鎮西將軍)
- In office 220–222
- Monarch: Cao Pi

Army Protector Who Attacks Shu (征蜀護軍)
- In office 219–220
- Monarch: Emperor Xian of Han
- Chancellor: Cao Cao

Commandant of the Central Army (中領軍)
- In office 218–219
- Monarch: Emperor Xian of Han
- Chancellor: Cao Cao

Central Resolute General (中堅將軍)
- In office 217–218
- Monarch: Emperor Xian of Han
- Chancellor: Cao Cao

Personal details
- Born: Unknown (Note: Although Cao Zhen's age when he died was not recorded, depending on the account of his origins, he was a child in 191 (Weishu) or 195 (Weilüe). Thus, his birth year is likely to be in the 180s or early 190s.)
- Died: April or May 231 (Note: Cao Rui's biography in the Sanguozhi recorded that Cao Zhen died in the 3rd month of the 5th year of the Tai'he era of Cao Rui's reign. This month corresponds to 20 April to 18 May 231 in the Gregorian calendar.) Luoyang, Henan
- Children: Cao Shuang; Cao Xi; Cao Xun; Cao Ze; Cao Yan; Cao Ai
- Parent: Cao Shao / Qin Bonan (Note: Pei Songzhi, who annotated Cao Zhen's biography in the Sanguozhi, noted that Cao Zhen's marquis title "Marquis of Shaoling" (邵陵侯) violated naming taboo because it contained the character shao (邵), which was the given name of Cao Zhen's biological father Cao Shao (曹邵) in the Sanguozhi and Wei Shu accounts. The Weilüe account of Cao Zhen's origins thus seems more likely to be the correct one as compared to the Sanguozhi and Wei Shu account.) (father)
- Relatives: Cao Bin (brother); Xiahou Shang's wife (sister); Xiahou Xuan (nephew); Xiahou Hui (niece)
- Occupation: General
- Courtesy name: Zidan (子丹)
- Posthumous name: Marquis Yuan (元侯)
- Peerage: Marquis of Shaoling (邵陵侯)

Cao Zhen (died April or May 231), courtesy name Zidan, was a military general of the state of Cao Wei during the Three Kingdoms period of China. He was an adopted son of Cao Cao, a warlord who rose to power in the late Eastern Han dynasty and laid the foundation for Wei. After Cao Cao's death and the end of the Eastern Han dynasty, Cao Zhen served under Cao Pi and Cao Rui, the first two emperors of Wei. He is best known for leading a successful defence of Wei from the first two of a series of invasions by Wei's rival state, Shu Han, between 228 and 229.

== Family background ==
There are two accounts of Cao Zhen's origins. The first, from the Records of the Three Kingdoms (Sanguozhi) and Wei Shu (魏書; by Wang Chen), claimed that Cao Zhen was a distant younger relative of Cao Cao, a warlord who rose to power in the late Eastern Han dynasty and controlled the Han central government. Cao Zhen's father, Cao Shao (曹邵), was a close aide to Cao Cao and was known for his intelligence and loyalty. Around 191, when Cao Cao was raising an army to join the Guandong Coalition, he sent Cao Shao to recruit soldiers from the various commanderies. Huang Wan (黃琬), the Inspector of Yu Province at the time, plotted to assassinate Cao Cao. Cao Shao sacrificed his life to save Cao Cao.

The second account, from the Weilüe, mentioned that Cao Zhen's original family name was Qin (秦), and that he was adopted into the Cao family. In this account, Cao Zhen's father was one Qin Bonan (秦伯南), who was a close friend of Cao Cao. Around 195, when Cao Cao was being attacked by soldiers under a rival warlord Yuan Shu, he took shelter in Qin Bonan's house. When the soldiers showed up and asked him where Cao Cao was, Qin Bonan claimed that he was Cao Cao and was killed by the soldiers. Out of gratitude to Qin Bonan for saving his life, Cao Cao adopted his children and allowed them to bear his family name.

== Service under Cao Cao ==
In any case, Cao Cao took pity on Cao Zhen, adopted him and allowed him to live with one of his own sons, Cao Pi. One day, while Cao Zhen was out hunting, he encountered a ferocious tiger which started chasing him. Cao Zhen turned back and killed the tiger with a single arrow shot. Cao Cao was so impressed with Cao Zhen's bravery that he appointed his adopted son as an officer in the elite "Tiger and Leopard Cavalry" (虎豹騎) of his army. Cao Zhen scored his first victory in battle when he defeated bandits in Lingqiu County (靈丘縣; east of present-day Lingqiu County, Shanxi). In recognition of his achievement, the Han imperial court enfeoffed him as the Marquis of Lingshou Village (靈壽亭侯).

=== Hanzhong Campaign ===
Between 217 and 219, Cao Zhen fought in Hanzhong Commandery against Cao Cao's rival Liu Bei, who had launched a campaign to seize control of Hanzhong Commandery from Cao Cao. When Liu Bei sent Wu Lan (吳蘭), one of his officers, to lead troops to garrison at Xiabian County (下辯縣; northwest of present-day Cheng County, Gansu), Cao Cao ordered his cousin Cao Hong to lead an army to attack the enemy. Along with Cao Xiu and Cao Hong, Cao Zhen fought at Xiabian County and defeated Wu Lan. He was promoted to Central Resolute General (中堅將軍) for his achievement.

When Cao Zhen returned to Chang'an, Cao Cao appointed him as Commandant of the Central Army (中領軍). At the time, as his general Xiahou Yuan had been killed in action against Liu Bei's forces at the Battle of Mount Dingjun, Cao Cao was worried that Liu Bei would press on the attack at Yangping Pass (陽平關; in present-day Ningqiang County, Shaanxi). He commissioned Cao Zhen as Army Protector Who Attacks Shu (征蜀護軍) and ordered him and Xu Huang to lead troops to attack Gao Xiang, an officer under Liu Bei, at Yangping Pass. Cao Zhen and Xu Huang defeated Gao Xiang and drove him back. In 219, after a prolonged war against Liu Bei, Cao Cao eventually decided to give up defending Hanzhong Commandery so he withdrew all his forces. During the retreat, he sent Cao Zhen to Wudu Commandery (武都郡; around present-day Cheng County, Gansu) to meet up with Cao Hong and relay his order for them to retreat to Chencang (陳倉; east of present-day Baoji, Shaanxi).

== Service under Cao Pi ==
Following Cao Cao's death in March 220, his son Cao Pi succeeded him as the (vassal) King of Wei (魏王) and Imperial Chancellor (丞相) of the Eastern Han dynasty. Cao Pi appointed Cao Zhen as General Who Guards the West (鎮西將軍) and ordered him to supervise military operations in Yong and Liang provinces in western China. He also elevated Cao Zhen from the status of a village marquis to a district marquis under the title "Marquis of Dong District" (東鄉侯). During Cao Zhen's tenure, when one Zhang Jin (張進) started a rebellion in Jiuquan Commandery, Cao Zhen ordered his subordinate Fei Yao to lead troops to quell the rebellion. Fei Yao succeeded in his mission and killed Zhang Jin.

In late 220, Cao Pi usurped the throne from Emperor Xian, ended the Eastern Han dynasty, and established the state of Cao Wei with himself as the new emperor. Two years later, Cao Pi summoned Cao Zhen to the Wei imperial capital, Luoyang, where he reassigned Cao Zhen to be Senior General of the Upper Army (上軍大將軍), awarded him a ceremonial axe, and put him in charge of supervising military affairs throughout Wei.

=== Battle of Jiangling ===
In 223, Cao Pi ordered Cao Zhen, Xiahou Shang, Zhang He and others to lead Wei forces to attack Wei's rival state, Eastern Wu, while he personally stationed at Wan (宛; in present-day Nanyang, Henan) to provide backup. The Wei forces attacked and besieged Jiangling (江陵; present-day Jiangling County, Hubei), which was defended by the Wu general Zhu Ran and some 5,000 soldiers. The Wei forces managed to defeat Wu reinforcements led by Sun Sheng (孫盛), Pan Zhang and Yang Can (楊粲), who were trying to help Zhu Ran. During the siege, Cao Zhen ordered his troops to dig tunnels, pile up earth to form small mounds, and build watchtowers to rain arrows on the defenders in Jiangling. Zhu Ran and his men managed to hold their ground and even found a small opportunity to counterattack and destroy two Wei camps. After some six months of siege, the Wei forces could not breach Jiangling's walls so they retreated.

During the campaign, Cao Zhen and Xiahou Shang managed to destroy a Wu garrison at Niuzhu (牛渚; northwest of present-day Dangtu County, Anhui). After he returned from the campaign, Cao Zhen was reassigned to be Senior General of the Central Army (中軍大將軍) and given an additional appointment as an Official Who Concurrently Serves in the Palace (給事中).

=== Incident with Wu Zhi ===
In 224, Cao Pi ordered Wu Zhi to host a banquet in his residence to celebrate Cao Zhen's return from a campaign. In Cao Pi's imperial edict, all officers holding the rank of Senior General (上將軍) with "Specially Advanced" (特進) status and below had to attend. During the banquet, Wu Zhi instructed actors to put up a skit to make fun of Cao Zhen and Zhu Shuo (朱鑠), who were fat and thin respectively. Cao Zhen turned furious and he shouted at Wu Zhi, "Are you and your men seeking a fight with me and my men?" Cao Hong and Wang Zhong egged Wu Zhi on by saying, "If you want to make the General (Cao Zhen) admit that he is fat, you have to show that you're thin." Cao Zhen drew his sword, glared at them and said, "I'll kill whoever dares to mock me." Wu Zhi also drew his sword and insulted Cao Zhen by saying, "Cao Zidan, you're not meat under a butcher's cleaver. My throat won't tremble when I swallow you and my teeth won't chatter when I chew on you. How dare you behave so rudely!" Zhu Shuo stood up and tried to reduce tensions by telling Wu Zhi, "His Majesty ordered you to host entertainment for everyone. Do you have to do this?" Wu Zhi then shouted at Zhu Shuo, "Zhu Shuo, how dare you leave your seat!" Everyone then returned to their seats. Zhu Shuo felt outraged but did not say anything, and returned to his seat and used his sword to hit the ground.

== Service under Cao Rui ==
In 226, when Cao Pi became critically ill, he ordered Cao Zhen, Chen Qun, Sima Yi and others to assist his son, Cao Rui, who later succeeded him as the second emperor of Wei. After his coronation, Cao Rui elevated Cao Zhen from the status of a district marquis to a county marquis under the title "Marquis of Shaoling" (邵陵侯), and promoted him to the position of General-in-Chief (大將軍) in January or February 227.

=== Tianshui revolts ===
In the spring of 228, Zhuge Liang, the Imperial Chancellor (丞相) of Wei's rival state Shu Han, launched the first of a series of military campaigns against Wei and led the Shu forces to attack Mount Qi (祁山; the mountainous regions around present-day Li County, Gansu). At the same time, he also ordered Zhao Yun and Deng Zhi to lead a detachment of troops to Ji Valley (箕谷) and pretend to be preparing to attack Mei County (郿縣; southeast of present-day Fufeng County, Shaanxi), so as to draw the Wei forces' attention away from Mount Qi. Three Wei-controlled commanderies – Nan'an (南安; around present-day Longxi County, Gansu), Tianshui and Anding (安定; around present-day Zhenyuan County, Gansu) – responded to the Shu invasion by defecting to the Shu side.

When the Wei imperial court received news of the invasion, Cao Rui ordered Cao Zhen to lead Wei forces to resist the invaders. At Ji Valley, Cao Zhen easily defeated Zhao Yun and Deng Zhi, who had been given command of the weaker soldiers in the Shu army. (Zhuge Liang had reserved the better soldiers for his own army to attack Mount Qi.) In the meantime, the Wei general Zhang He attacked and defeated the Shu general Ma Su at the Battle of Jieting. Around the time, one Yang Tiao (楊條) from Anding Commandery had rallied some followers, taken the commandery officials hostage and captured the revenue office. When Cao Zhen and his troops besieged Anding Commandery, Yang Tiao tied himself up and surrendered. Zhuge Liang and the Shu forces retreated upon learning of Ma Su’s defeat. The Wei forces under Cao Zhen and Zhang He then used the opportunity to quell the rebellions in the three commanderies and restore peace.

=== Siege of Chencang ===
After repelling the first Shu invasion, Cao Zhen observed that if Shu were to invade Wei again, they would attack via Chencang (陳倉; east of present-day Baoji, Shaanxi). He then put Hao Zhao and Wang Sheng (王生) in charge of defending Chencang and ordered them to strengthen the fortress's defences. As Cao Zhen foresaw, Zhuge Liang indeed led Shu forces to attack Chencang in the spring of 229. However, as Hao Zhao and the Wei defenders were well-prepared, they managed to hold their ground against the second Shu invasion. Zhuge Liang ordered a retreat after failing to breach Chencang's walls. As a reward for Cao Zhen's contributions, Cao Rui increased the number of taxable households in his marquisate, bringing it up to a total of 2,900.

=== Campaign against Shu ===
In 230, Cao Rui summoned Cao Zhen to the imperial capital Luoyang, where he promoted him to Grand Marshal (大司馬) and awarded him the ceremonial privileges of carrying a sword and wearing shoes into the imperial court, as well as not having to walk in briskly during imperial court sessions.

During this meeting with Cao Rui, Cao Zhen proposed launching a large-scale invasion of Shu from multiple directions to eliminate the threat once and for all. Cao Rui approved his proposal and personally saw him off from Luoyang. In August 230, Cao Zhen led an army from Chang'an to attack Shu via the Ziwu Valley (子午谷). At the same time, another Wei army led by Sima Yi, acting on Cao Rui's order, advanced towards Shu from Jing Province by sailing along the Han River. The rendezvous point for Cao Zhen and Sima Yi's armies was at Nanzheng County (南鄭縣; in present-day Hanzhong, Shaanxi). Other Wei armies also prepared to attack Shu from the Xie Valley (斜谷) or Wuwei Commandery. However, the campaign eventually had to be aborted in October 230 because the gallery roads leading into Shu were too damaged for the troops to pass through, and also because of rainy weather lasting more than 30 days.

=== Death ===
Cao Zhen fell sick on the journey back to Luoyang and became bedridden in the subsequent months. During this time, Cao Rui personally visited Cao Zhen to check on his condition. Cao Zhen eventually died of illness in April or May 231. Cao Rui honoured him with the posthumous title "Marquis Yuan" (元侯).

== Appraisal ==
Cao Zhen was known for being generous with his personal wealth. In his younger days, he served under his foster father Cao Cao along with Cao Zun (曹遵), a distant relative of his, and Zhu Zan (朱讚), who was from the same hometown as him. Both Cao Zun and Zhu Zan died early. Cao Zhen took pity on their families so he requested permission from Cao Rui to give away parts of his marquisate to Cao Zun and Zhu Zan's sons. Cao Rui issued an imperial decree to praise Cao Zhen for his kindness, and award secondary marquis titles to Cao Zun and Zhu Zan's sons and give them each 100 taxable households.

Cao Zhen was also known for sharing weal and woe with his troops whenever he led them into battle. Every time after a battle, if there were insufficient rewards to be given out to all his men, he would use his personal wealth to make up for the difference. His men gladly accepted his kindness.

== Family ==
Cao Zhen had a younger brother, Cao Bin (曹彬), who received a marquis title and a marquisate of 200 taxable households by Cao Pi's decree. He also had a younger sister who married Xiahou Shang and bore Xiahou Xuan and Xiahou Hui; her personal name is unknown and she was referred to as the Lady of Deyang District (德陽鄉主).

Cao Zhen had six sons: Cao Shuang, Cao Xi (曹羲), Cao Xun (曹訓), Cao Ze (曹則), Cao Yan (曹彥) and Cao Ai (曹皚). Among them, Cao Shuang inherited his father's peerage and marquisate as the Marquis of Shaoling (邵陵侯), while the other five also had their own marquis titles and marquisates. In January 239, before Cao Rui died, he appointed Cao Shuang and Sima Yi as regents for his underage adopted son, Cao Fang, who succeeded him as the third emperor of Wei. In February 249, Sima Yi staged a coup d'état against Cao Shuang and successfully seized power from him. After the coup d'état, Cao Shuang and his brothers were convicted of treason and executed along with their entire families.

== In popular culture ==
=== Romance of the Three Kingdoms ===
Cao Zhen appears as a character in the 14th-century historical novel Romance of the Three Kingdoms, which romanticises the historical figures and events before and during the Three Kingdoms period. He makes a late first appearance in Chapter 84 when he accompanies Cao Pi on a campaign against Eastern Wu.

Cao Zhen starts to play a more important role from Chapter 91 onwards when the Shu regent Zhuge Liang launches the Northern Expeditions against Wei. His contributions in the series of battles against Shu are largely downplayed because the author, Luo Guanzhong, wanted to accentuate Sima Yi's resourcefulness and effectively portray him as Zhuge Liang's nemesis. Luo Guanzhong even attributed Cao Zhen's death to his failure to heed Sima Yi's forewarning of a Shu offensive.

In Chapter 100, Sima Yi warns Cao Zhen that Shu forces will, within the next ten days, launch an attack on Mount Qi (祁山; the mountainous regions around present-day Li County, Gansu), a strategic location which would allow further incursions into the Wei heartland. After Cao Zhen refuses to believe Sima Yi, the two make a bet and each of them leads half of the Wei army to guard the valleys to the east and west of Mount Qi. Cao Zhen prepares for battle halfheartedly as he thinks that he is right. Seven days later, when his scouts report that a small number of Shu soldiers are approaching the valley, Cao Zhen sends his subordinate Qin Liang (秦良) to lead 5,000 men to survey the terrain. As Qin Liang and his men travel deeper into the valley, they fall into an ambush by Shu forces led by Liao Hua and Guan Xing and are completely destroyed. The Shu forces then disguise themselves by wearing the Wei soldiers' armour and uniform and infiltrate Cao Zhen's camp. In the meantime, Sima Yi encounters and defeats Shu forces led by Wei Yan. When he learns that no enemy forces have been spotted at Cao Zhen's side, he immediately leads his troops to Cao Zhen's camp. By then, the Shu infiltrators have launched a surprise attack within Cao Zhen's camp. Sima Yi shows up in time, drives back the Shu forces, and saves Cao Zhen. Cao Zhen feels so ashamed of himself that he falls sick. Zhuge Liang writes a letter to Cao Zhen to taunt and insult him. Cao Zhen becomes so angry after reading the letter that he coughs blood and dies that night in his camp. Sima Yi sends his dead body back to Luoyang, where he receives a proper burial.

=== Modern depictions ===
==== Television and films ====
- In the 1994 Mainland TV series Romance of the Three Kingdoms, he is portrayed by Zheng Qiang (郑强).
- In the 2000 Hong Kong TV series Incurable Traits (醫神華佗), he is portrayed by Choi Kwok-Hing (蔡國慶).
- In the 2010 Mainland TV series Three Kingdoms, he is portrayed by Zhao Jin (赵晋).
- In the 2012 Mainland film The Assassins, he is portrayed by Wang Yuzheng (王羽铮).
- In the 2013 Mainland TV series Legend of Goddess Luo (新洛神), he is portrayed by Sun Haochen (孙昊宸).
- In the 2017 Mainland TV series The Advisors Alliance, he is portrayed by Zhang He (章贺).
- In the 2023 Japanese film Jinrou Sangokushi-hen (狼獵人出發！人狼 三國志篇), he is portrayed by Rui Tabuchi (田淵累生).

==== Comics ====
- He appears in the Hong Kong manhua The Ravages of Time (2001-) by Chan Mou.

== See also ==
- Lists of people of the Three Kingdoms
