= Zhuge Jin =

State of Eastern Wu official (174–241)

- 諸葛瑾
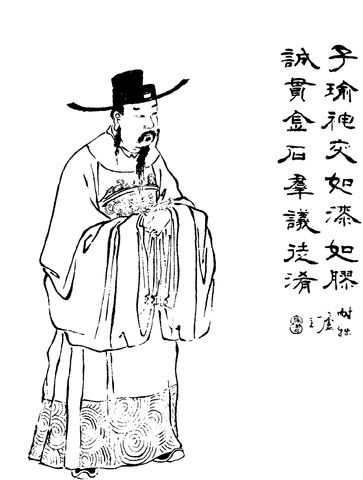
- A Qing dynasty illustration of Zhuge Jin

General-in-Chief (大將軍)
- In office 229 – July or August 241
- Monarch: Sun Quan

Governor of Yu Province (豫州牧) (nominal)
- In office 229 – July or August 241
- Monarch: Sun Quan

Left Protector-General (左都護)
- In office 229 – July or August 241
- Monarch: Sun Quan

General of the Left (左將軍)
- In office 222 – 229
- Monarch: Sun Quan

Administrator of Nan Commandery (南郡太守)
- In office 220 – 222
- Monarch: Sun Quan
- Preceded by: Lü Meng

Personal details
- Born: 174 Yinan County, Shandong
- Died: July or August 241 (aged 67) (Note: Sun Quan's biography in the Sanguozhi recorded that Zhuge Jin died in the leap month of the 4th year of the Chiwu era of Sun Quan's reign. This month corresponds to 26 July to 23 August 241 in the Gregorian calendar.)
- Relations: Zhuge Liang (younger brother); Zhuge Jun (brother); two sisters; Zhuge Dan (cousin); Zhuge Xuan (cousin-uncle)
- Children: Zhuge Ke; Zhuge Qiao; Zhuge Rong; Zhang Cheng's wife
- Parent: Zhuge Gui (father)
- Occupation: General, politician
- Courtesy name: Ziyu (子瑜)
- Peerage: Marquis of Wanling (宛陵侯)

Zhuge Jin (174 – July or August 241), courtesy name Ziyu, was a Chinese military general and politician of the state of Eastern Wu during the Three Kingdoms period of China. Born in the late Eastern Han dynasty, Zhuge Jin started his career in the 200s as an official under the warlord Sun Quan, who later became the founding emperor of Eastern Wu in the Three Kingdoms period. In 215, he served as Sun Quan's representative in a territorial dispute over southern Jing Province between Sun Quan and his ally, Liu Bei. In 219, he joined Sun Quan's general Lü Meng in an invasion of Liu Bei's territories in Jing Province after Sun Quan broke the Sun–Liu alliance. He was subsequently appointed as a general and commandery administrator. Before the Battle of Xiaoting of 221–222, Zhuge Jin attempted to dissuade Liu Bei from going to war with Sun Quan but was unsuccessful. The battle ultimately concluded with victory for Sun Quan's side; both sides made peace later and reestablished an alliance between the Eastern Wu and Shu Han states against their rival state, Cao Wei. From 222 until his death in 241, despite being rather incompetent in military affairs, Zhuge Jin served as one of Eastern Wu's top generals and participated in some battles against Cao Wei forces.

Although Zhuge Jin was not as brilliant in statecraft and military strategy as his more famous brother Zhuge Liang, he was known throughout his life for his virtuous character. He had a reputation for conducting himself with grace and decorum, and for being thoughtful, magnanimous and tactful. In return, he gained Sun Quan's trust, and Sun Quan never questioned his loyalty towards him. Zhuge Jin was also known for helping to mediate conflicts between Sun Quan and his subjects, including Zhu Zhi and Yu Fan.

== Family background ==
Zhuge Jin's ancestral home (and probably birthplace too) was in Yangdu County (陽都縣), Langya Commandery (琅邪郡), which is located in present-day Yinan County or Yishui County, Shandong. (Note: (諸葛瑾字子瑜，琅邪陽都人也。) Sanguozhi vol. 52.) There are two other accounts of his ancestral origins in the Wu Shu (吳書) and Fengsu Tong (風俗通).

The Wu Shu recorded that his ancestral family name was actually Ge (葛) and his ancestors were originally from Zhu County (諸縣; southwest of present-day Zhucheng, Shandong) before they settled in Yangdu County. As there was already another Ge family in Yangdu County before they came, the locals referred to the newcomers as the Zhuge – combining Zhu (County) and Ge – to distinguish them from the other Ge family. Over time, Zhuge Liang's ancestors adopted Zhuge as their family name. (Note: (吳書曰：其先葛氏，本琅邪諸縣人，後徙陽都。陽都先有姓葛者，時人謂之諸葛，因以為氏。) Wu Shu annotation in Sanguozhi vol. 52.)

The Fengsu Tong recorded that his ancestor was Ge Ying (葛嬰), a general who served under Chen Sheng, the rebel king who led the Dazexiang uprising against the Qin dynasty. Chen Sheng later executed Ge Ying. During the early Western Han dynasty, Emperor Wen considered that Ge Ying was unjustly put to death, so he enfeoffed Ge Ying's grandson as the Marquis of Zhu County to honour Ge Ying. Over time, Ge Ying's descendants adopted Zhuge as their family name by combining Zhu (County) and Ge. (Note: (風俗通曰：葛嬰為陳涉將軍，有功而誅，孝文帝追錄，封其孫諸縣侯，因并氏焉。此與吳書所說不同。) Fengsu Tong annotation in Sanguozhi vol. 52.)

The earliest known ancestor of Zhuge Jin who bore the family name Zhuge was Zhuge Feng (諸葛豐), a Western Han dynasty official who served as Colonel-Director of Retainers (司隷校尉) under Emperor Yuan (r. 48–33 BCE). Zhuge Jin's father, Zhuge Gui (諸葛珪), whose courtesy name was Jungong (君貢), served as an assistant official in Taishan Commandery (泰山郡; around present-day Tai'an, Shandong) in the late Eastern Han dynasty under Emperor Ling (r. 168–189 CE). (Note: (諸葛亮字孔明，琅邪陽都人也。漢司隷校尉諸葛豐後也。父珪，字君貢，漢末為太山郡丞。) Sanguozhi vol. 35.)

Zhuge Jin had two younger brothers and two sisters. His brothers were Zhuge Liang and Zhuge Jun (諸葛均). (Note: (亮早孤，從父玄為袁術所署豫章太守，玄將亮及亮弟均之官。) Sanguozhi vol. 35.) One of their two sisters married Kuai Qi (蒯祺) while the other married Pang Shanmin (龐山民), a cousin of Pang Tong. (Note: (襄陽記曰： ... [龐]德公子山民，亦有令名，娶諸葛孔明小姊， ...) Xiangyang Ji annotation in Sanguozhi vol. 37.)

== Early life ==
In his youth, Zhuge Jin visited Luoyang, the imperial capital, where he studied classical texts such as the Mao Commentary on the Classic of Poetry, Book of Documents, and Zuo Zhuan. When his mother died, he went home and dutifully performed filial mourning. He also treated his stepmother in a courteous and respectful manner, which earned him fame for his filial piety. (Note: (瑾少游京師，治毛詩、尚書、左氏春秋。遭母憂，居喪至孝，事繼母恭謹，甚得人子之道。) Wu Shu annotation in Sanguozhi vol. 52.)

When chaos broke out throughout China towards the end of the Eastern Han dynasty, Zhuge Jin fled from home and headed south to the Jiangdong region for shelter. He travelled around the region with Bu Zhi and Yan Jun, and they earned themselves fine reputations as learned men. (Note: (吳書曰： ... 與琅邪諸葛瑾、彭城嚴畯俱游吳中，並著聲名，為當時英俊。) Wu Shu annotation in Sanguozhi vol. 52.) At the time (c. 200s), Sun Quan had recently succeeded his deceased elder brother, Sun Ce, as the warlord ruling over the territories in Jiangdong. Hong Zi, a brother-in-law of Sun Quan (who married an elder half-sister of Quan's) (Note: Hong Zi's wife was an elder half-sister of Sun Quan. Thus, she is not Lady Sun, the best known of Sun Quan's sisters.) noticed and recognised Zhuge Jin's talent so he recommended Zhuge Jin to serve under Sun Quan. Sun Quan treated Zhuge Jin, Lu Su and other talents who came to join him like honoured guests. Zhuge Jin then started his career under Sun Quan as a Chief Clerk (長史). Later, he was reassigned to the position of a Central Major (中司馬). (Note: (漢末避亂江東。值孫策卒，孫權姊壻曲阿弘咨見而異之，薦之於權，與魯肅等並見賔待，後為權長史，轉中司馬。) Sanguozhi vol. 52.)

== Sun–Liu territorial dispute ==
Sometime between June and August 215, (Note: The Zizhi Tongjian recorded that this event took place between the 5th and 6th months of the 20th year of the Jian'an era in Emperor Xian's reign. These months correspond to 15 June to 12 August 215 in the Gregorian calendar.) Sun Quan sent Zhuge Jin as his representative to visit his ally, Liu Bei, who had recently seized control of Yi Province (covering present-day Sichuan and Chongqing). Zhuge Jin's task was to ask Liu Bei to "return" the territories in southern Jing Province (covering present-day Hubei and Hunan) to Sun Quan, according to an earlier agreement that Liu Bei would only use Jing Province as a temporary base and would return them to Sun Quan once he found another base. However, Liu Bei refused and said he would return the territories after he seized Liang Province.

Sun Quan ignored Liu Bei and sent his officials to assume office in the three commanderies of Changsha (長沙), Lingling (零陵) and Guiyang (桂陽) in southern Jing Province. However, Guan Yu, Liu Bei's general in charge of defending those territories, drove Sun Quan's officials away. An enraged Sun Quan then ordered his general Lü Meng to lead 20,000 troops to seize the three commanderies by force. After a standoff between both sides and tense negotiations, Liu Bei agreed to divide southern Jing Province between his and Sun Quan's domains along the Xiang River: Liu Bei would keep Nan, Lingling and Wuling commanderies in the west, while Sun Quan would take Changsha, Jiangxia and Guiyang commanderies in the east.

The territorial dispute was resolved by mid August to early September 215. (Note: The Zizhi Tongjian recorded that the dispute ended before the 7th month of the 20th year of the Jian'an era in Emperor Xian's reign. This month corresponds to 13 August to 10 September 215 in the Gregorian calendar.) Sun Quan then sent Zhuge Jin as his representative to visit Liu Bei again. During this trip, Zhuge Jin met his second brother Zhuge Liang, who was serving as an adviser to Liu Bei. They refrained from meeting each other in private (Note: (建安二十年，權遣瑾使蜀通好劉備，與其弟亮俱公會相見，退無私面。) Sanguozhi vol. 52.) to dispel any suspicions that either of them was secretly collaborating with his brother against his lord.

== Role in the Wu–Shu conflict ==
=== Wu invasion of Jing Province ===
In 219, Sun Quan broke the Sun–Liu alliance and ordered his general Lü Meng to lead troops to seize Liu Bei's territories in southern Jing Province, which were guarded by Liu Bei's general Guan Yu, who was away at the Battle of Fancheng at the time. Zhuge Jin participated in the invasion, which turned out successful. Guan Yu was eventually captured and executed by Sun Quan's forces. Lü Meng died of illness a few months after the victory. In recognition of Zhuge Jin's contributions during the campaign, Sun Quan enfeoffed him as the Marquis of Xuancheng (宣城侯) and appointed him as General Who Pacifies the South (綏南將軍) to replace Lü Meng as the Administrator (太守) of Nan Commandery (南郡; around present-day Jingzhou, Hubei), the former headquarters of Liu Bei's territories in Jing Province. Zhuge Jin was stationed at Gong'an County, one of the key counties in Nan Commandery. (Note: (後從討關羽，封宣城侯，以綏南將軍代呂蒙領南郡太守，住公安。) Sanguozhi vol. 52.)

In 220, Cao Pi usurped the throne from Emperor Xian, ended the Eastern Han dynasty, and established the state of Cao Wei (or Wei) with himself as the new emperor. This event marked the end of the Eastern Han dynasty and the beginning of the Three Kingdoms period in China. Sun Quan pledged nominal allegiance to Cao Pi and became a vassal of Wei. In return, Cao Pi awarded Sun Quan the title "King of Wu" and granted him autonomous rule over the Jiangdong (or Wu) territories. A year later, Liu Bei declared himself emperor and established the state of Shu Han (or Shu) to contest Cao Pi's legitimacy.

=== Battle of Xiaoting ===
In 221, when Liu Bei started the Battle of Xiaoting against Sun Quan to retake his lost territories in southern Jing Province, Sun Quan sent Zhuge Jin as his representative to meet Liu Bei and begin peace talks. (Note: (劉備東伐吳，吳王求和， ...) Sanguozhi vol. 52.) Zhuge Jin told Liu Bei:

"I heard that your army has come from Baidicheng, and that your subjects have advised you to reject peace talks due to the hostilities between us which arose from the King of Wu's occupation of Jing Province and Guan Yu's death. I am deeply worried because such thinking shows narrow-mindedness on their part, as well as their failure to take the bigger picture into consideration. I shall attempt to explain the gravity of the situation to Your Majesty. If Your Majesty can temporarily lower your pride, put aside your anger, and carefully think through what I am about to say, I am sure that Your Majesty will be able to finalise your decision. There will also be no need to seek further counsel from your subjects. Is Your Majesty's relationship with Guan Yu comparable to that with the emperors (of the Han dynasty)? Is one Jing Province comparable to the entire Empire? Between your two enemies, whom do you hate more? If you can answer these questions, then I am sure it won't be difficult for you to finalise your decision." (Note: (瑾與備牋曰：「奄聞旗鼓來至白帝，或恐議臣以吳王侵取此州，危害關羽，怨深禍大，不宜荅和，此用心於小，未留意於大者也。試為陛下論其輕重，及其大小。陛下若抑威損忿，蹔省瑾言者，計可立決，不復咨之於羣后也。陛下以關羽之親何如先帝？荊州大小孰與海內？俱應仇疾，誰當先後？若審此數，易於反掌。」) Sanguozhi vol. 52.)

In his annotations to Zhuge Jin's biography in the Sanguozhi, the fifth-century historian Pei Songzhi rebutted Zhuge Jin's speech to Liu Bei. From Pei Songzhi's point of view, Liu Bei had good reason(s) to go to war with Sun Quan because Sun Quan thwarted his attempts to revive the Eastern Han dynasty when he broke the Sun–Liu alliance and seized Jing Province. Pei Songzhi also noted that Liu Bei's relationship with Guan Yu was so close that it could not be described in words. He remarked that if Liu Bei and Guan Yu's relationship were to be described in words in the Sanguozhi, it would take up so much space that it becomes a waste of space. (Note: (臣松之云：以為劉后以庸蜀為關河，荊楚為維翰，關羽揚兵沔、漢，志陵上國，雖匡主定霸，功未可必，要為威聲遠震，有其經略。孫權潛包禍心，助魏除害，是為翦宗子勤王之師，行曹公移都之計，拯漢之規，於茲而止。義旗所指，宜其在孫氏矣。瑾以大義責備，荅之何患無辭；且備、羽相與，有若四體，股肱橫虧，憤痛已深，豈此奢闊之書所能迴駐哉！載之於篇，寔為辭章之費。) Pei Songzhi's annotation in Sanguozhi vol. 52.)

The Battle of Xiaoting ended in late 222 with victory for Sun Quan's forces, which were led by Sun Quan's general Lu Xun. Liu Bei retreated to Baidicheng (in present-day Fengjie County, Chongqing) after his disastrous defeat and died of illness in early 223.

== Battles against Wei ==
In late 222, Sun Quan, who was previously a vassal king under the Cao Wei state, broke ties with the Wei emperor Cao Pi and declared himself the independent ruler of his Eastern Wu state. He promoted Zhuge Jin to General of the Left (左將軍), granted him acting imperial authority, and ordered him to station at Gong'an County to oversee the Wu defences in southern Jing Province. He also enfeoffed Zhuge Jin as the Marquis of Wanling (宛陵侯). (Note: (黃武元年，遷左將軍，督公安，假節，封宛陵侯。) Sanguozhi vol. 52.)

=== Battle of Jiangling (223) ===
Between 222 and 223, the Wei generals Cao Zhen and Xiahou Shang led their troops to attack the Wu-controlled Jiangling County (江陵縣; in present-day Jingzhou, Hubei), which was defended by the Wu general Zhu Ran. At the same time, another detachment of Wei troops occupied Zhongzhou (中州), an island in the Yangtze River near Jiangling County. When Zhuge Jin heard about it, he led Wu forces from Gong'an County to reinforce Zhu Ran. However, he turned out to be an incompetent military commander as he showed weak leadership, adopted a slow and reactive approach, and spent too much time on discussion and planning as opposed to actively seizing opportunities to attack the enemy. Due to his incompetence, the siege dragged on, and Sun Quan became rather unhappy with him. The siege on Jiangling County was eventually lifted after the Wu general Pan Zhang came up with a plan to burn down the Wei forces' pontoon bridges and drive them back. Although Zhuge Jin did not make any significant achievements in the battle, he received credit for contributing to the Wu forces' overall success in defending Jiangling County. (Note: (吳錄曰：曹真、夏侯尚等圍朱然於江陵，又分據中州，瑾以大兵為之救援。瑾性弘緩，推道理，任計畫，無應卒倚伏之術，兵乆不解，權以此望之。及春水生，潘璋等作水城於上流，瑾進攻浮橋，真等退走。雖無大勳，亦以全師保境為功。) Wu Lu annotation in Sanguozhi vol. 52.)

=== Battle of Xiangyang (226) ===
Between September and early November 226, (Note: The Zizhi Tongjian recorded that these events took place between the 8th and 9th months of the 7th year of the Huangchu era in Cao Pi's reign. This period corresponds to 10 September to 7 November 226 in the Gregorian calendar.) following Cao Pi's death and Cao Rui's accession to the Wei throne, Sun Quan personally led Wu forces to attack the Wei-controlled Jiangxia Commandery, which was defended by the Wei general Wen Ping. At the same time, he ordered Zhuge Jin and Zhang Ba (張霸) to lead a separate Wu army to attack the Wei-controlled city of Xiangyang. However, Zhuge Jin lost the battle against Wei forces led by Sima Yi. Zhang Ba was killed in battle and the Wu army lost over 1,000 men. In the meantime, Sun Quan mistakenly believed that Wei reinforcements had arrived at Jiangxia Commandery, so he pulled back his troops and returned to Wu.

=== Battle of Xiangyang (234) ===
Between mid June and early September 234, (Note: The Zizhi Tongjian recorded that these events took place between the 5th and 7th months of the 2nd year of the Qinglong era in Cao Rui's reign. This period corresponds to 15 June to 10 September 234 in the Gregorian calendar.) Sun Quan personally led a 100,000 strong Wu army to attack the Wei fortress of Xincheng at Hefei. At the same time, he ordered Lu Xun and Zhuge Jin to lead another 10,000 troops to attack Xiangyang, and Sun Shao and Zhang Cheng to lead their troops to attack Huaiyin County (淮陰縣) in Guangling Commandery (around present-day Huai'an, Jiangsu). The Wei general Man Chong, who oversaw Xincheng's defences, successfully repelled the Wu invaders and killed Sun Quan's nephew Sun Tai in battle. Sun Quan eventually ordered a retreat when a plague broke out in his army and after he heard that the Wei emperor Cao Rui was personally leading reinforcements to Hefei. Sun Shao and Zhang Cheng also pulled back from Guangling Commandery after learning of Sun Quan's retreat from Hefei.

In the meantime, Lu Xun ordered a close aide, Han Bian (韓扁), to deliver a report to Sun Quan. On the journey back, Han Bian was captured by a Wei patrol. When Zhuge Jin learnt of Han Bian's capture, he became fearful so he wrote to Lu Xun and urged him to make a hasty retreat from Xiangyang. Lu Xun did not respond, and he instructed his men to plant turnips and peas while he played weiqi and other games with his officers as though nothing had happened. Zhuge Jin believed that Lu Xun knew what he was doing so he did not panic. He came to see Lu Xun, who told him: "The enemy knows that His Majesty (Sun Quan) has withdrawn his forces, so they have no worries and will concentrate their attacks on us. Besides, they have already stationed troops at critical positions and are poised to strike. Hence, we should remain composed and calm our men, after which we will have a change of plans and prepare to withdraw. If we display signs of retreat now, the enemy will think that we are afraid and will definitely attack us, resulting in defeat for us." (Note: (遜遣親人韓扁齎表奉報，還，遇敵於沔中，鈔邏得扁。瑾聞之甚懼，書與遜云：「大駕已旋，賊得韓扁，具知吾闊狹。且水乾，宜當急去。」遜未荅，方催人種葑豆，與諸將弈棊射戲如常。瑾曰：「伯言多智略，其當有以。」自來見遜，遜曰：「賊知大駕以旋，無所復慼，得專力於吾。又已守要害之處，兵將意動，且當自定以安之，施設變術，然後出耳。今便示退，賊當謂吾怖，仍來相蹙，必敗之勢也。」) Sanguozhi vol. 58.)

Lu Xun then secretly conveyed his plan to Zhuge Jin and ordered him to supervise the fleet of vessels on which they would sail back to Wu, while he gathered his troops and headed towards Xiangyang. The Wei forces had been wary of Lu Xun all this while so they immediately retreated into the city when they saw Lu Xun's army approaching. Lu Xun organised his men in an orderly manner and instructed them to pretend to prepare for an attack on Xiangyang. By then, Zhuge Jin and the fleet had shown up, so Lu Xun and his forces progressively retreated to the vessels and left. The Wei forces in Xiangyang did not dare to make any move. (Note: (乃密與瑾立計，令瑾督舟船，遜悉上兵馬，以向襄陽城。敵素憚遜，遽還赴城。瑾便引船出，遜徐整部伍，張拓聲勢，步趨船，敵不敢干。) Sanguozhi vol. 58.)

== Later life and death ==
In 229, after Sun Quan declared himself emperor of Eastern Wu, he appointed Zhuge Jin as General-in-Chief (大將軍), Left Protector-General (左都護), and as the nominal (Note: Yu Province (豫州) was under the control of Eastern Wu's rival state Cao Wei, so Zhuge Jin was only its governor in name.) Governor (牧) of Yu Province. (Note: (權稱尊號，拜大將軍、左都護，領豫州牧。) Sanguozhi vol. 52.)

After the Lü Yi scandal ended in 238, Sun Quan sent a personal representative to meet all his senior generals and apologise to them, as well as to seek their views on how he could reform the bureaucracy to prevent corrupt officials like Lü Yi from abusing their powers again. However, to his disappointment, Zhuge Jin and other generals such as Bu Zhi, Zhu Ran and Lü Dai gave the excuse that they were not in charge of civil affairs and said that civil affairs were best left to civil officials such as Lu Xun and Pan Jun. Sun Quan then wrote an emotional letter to them, blaming himself for the mistakes and urging them to give him honest advice and point out his mistakes. After receiving the letter, Zhuge Jin was so moved that he wrote a clear, detailed and well-reasoned response to the Lü Yi scandal and Sun Quan's queries. (Note: (及呂壹誅，權又有詔切磋瑾等，語在權傳。瑾輒因事以荅，辭順理正。) Sanguozhi vol. 52.)

Zhuge Jin died in July or August 241 at the age of 68 (by East Asian age reckoning). Before his death, he expressed a desire to be dressed in plain clothes and to have a simple funeral. (Note: (赤烏四年，年六十八卒，遺命令素棺歛以時服，事從省約。) Sanguozhi vol. 52.)

== Relationship with Sun Quan ==
Throughout his life, Zhuge Jin was known for conducting himself with grace and decorum, and for being thoughtful and magnanimous. These traits earned him much admiration and respect from his contemporaries. Sun Quan also regarded him highly and often consulted him on important issues. (Note: (瑾為人有容貌思度，于時服其弘雅。權亦重之，大事咨訪。) Sanguozhi vol. 52.)

Zhuge Jin was known for being tactful whenever he spoke to Sun Quan, be it giving advice or small talk. He spoke in a toned-down and indirect manner, gave only a brief outline of what he wanted to say, and stopped immediately once he sensed that Sun Quan got his point. When he realised that Sun Quan's views were at odds with his, he would subtly change the topic of the conversation and use other topics as analogies to persuade Sun Quan to see things from his point of view. He was successful as Sun Quan understood his views better and became more receptive of them. (Note: (與權談說諫喻，未甞切愕，微見風彩，粗陳指歸，如有未合，則捨而及他，徐復託事造端，以物類相求，於是權意往往而釋。) Sanguozhi vol. 52.)

After the Battle of Xiaoting of 221–222, someone secretly reported to Sun Quan that Zhuge Jin had sent a close aide to speak with Liu Bei. Sun Quan did not suspect Zhuge Jin's loyalty towards him and instead remarked, "I have made an oath with Ziyu. As long as Ziyu doesn't let me down, I won't let him down." (Note: (時或言瑾別遣親人與備相聞，權曰：「孤與子瑜有死生不易之誓，子瑜之不負孤，猶孤之不負子瑜也。」) Sanguozhi vol. 52.)

The Jiang Biao Zhuan (江表傳) recorded that when Zhuge Jin was serving as the Administrator of Nan Commandery, someone secretly reported to Sun Quan that Zhuge Jin had covert dealings with Liu Bei. When Lu Xun heard of such rumours, he wrote a memorial to Sun Quan to speak up for Zhuge Jin and reassure his lord that Zhuge Jin was loyal towards him. (Note: (江表傳曰：瑾之在南郡，人有密讒瑾者。此語頗流聞於外，陸遜表保明瑾無此，宜以散其意。) Jiang Biao Zhuan annotation in Sanguozhi vol. 52.) Sun Quan wrote a reply to Lu Xun as follows:

"Ziyu and I have worked together for many years. We are as close as siblings and I know him well. He is someone who will not do anything that is unprincipled, and will not say anything that is unrighteous. In the past, when Xuande sent Kongming to Wu, I told Ziyu: 'You and Kongming are brothers. It is proper and righteous for a younger brother to follow in the footsteps of his elder brother. Why don't you ask Kongming to stay here? If Kongming wishes to follow you and stay here, I will write to Xuande to explain to him and I think he will understand.' Ziyu replied: 'My younger brother, (Zhuge) Liang, has dedicated himself to serving his lord. He has committed himself to this mission and won't waver in his commitment. His refusal to stay here is as firm as my resolve to not leave you.' He showed great wisdom and insight when he said this. How can the rumours be true? I have previously received reports and heard rumours casting doubts on Ziyu's loyalty towards me, yet I collected and disclosed them to Ziyu. I also wrote a letter to him. In his reply, he discussed the roles of lords and subjects, and their places. My relationship with Ziyu is like a friendship in spirit; no one can sow discord between us. I understand the purpose of you writing to me. I will seal your memorial and send it to Ziyu to let him know of your good intentions." (Note: (權報曰：「子瑜與孤從事積年，恩如骨肉，深相明究，其為人非道不行，非義不言。玄德昔遣孔明至吳，孤甞語子瑜曰：『卿與孔明同產，且弟隨兄，於義為順，何以不留孔明？孔明若留從卿者，孤當以書解玄德，意自隨人耳。』子瑜荅孤言：『弟亮以生身於人，委質定分，義無二心。弟之不留，猶瑾之不往也。』其言足貫神明。今豈當有此乎？孤前得妄語文疏，即封示子瑜，并手筆與子瑜，即得其報，論天下君臣大節，一定之分。孤與子瑜，可謂神交，非外言所間也。知卿意至，輒封來表，以示子瑜，使知卿意。」) Jiang Biao Zhuan annotation in Sanguozhi vol. 52.)

== Mediating conflicts between Sun Quan and his subjects ==
Apart from being one of Sun Quan's most trusted subjects, Zhuge Jin was also known for helping to mediate conflicts between his lord and his subjects on a number of occasions as follows.

=== Zhu Zhi ===
Zhu Zhi was the official who recommended Sun Quan as a xiaolian (civil service candidate) to serve in the government when Sun Quan was still in his youth. After Sun Quan became the warlord ruling over the Jiangdong territories, Zhu Zhi served under Sun Quan and was held in high regard. Later, for some reason, Sun Quan became unhappy with Zhu Zhi but he could not bring himself to scold the latter, out of respect for him. (Note: (吳郡太守朱治，權舉將也，權曾有以望之，而素加敬，難自詰讓，忿忿不解。) Sanguozhi vol. 52.) Zhuge Jin noticed Sun Quan's frustration and figured out why. However, he kept quiet and decided to use an indirect method to help Sun Quan resolve the problem. He set up a hypothetical scenario similar to the conundrum Sun Quan faced, asked Sun Quan questions and guided his thoughts, and wrote them down as Sun Quan spoke. (Note: (瑾揣知其故，而不敢顯陳，乃乞以意私自問，遂於權前為書，泛論物理，因以己心遙往忖度之。) Sanguozhi vol. 52.) Once they were done, he presented his writing to Sun Quan, who was so pleased after reading it that he remarked: "You have helped me resolve my frustration. Yan Hui spoke of promoting harmony among people as a virtue. Isn't this an example of that?" (Note: (畢，以呈權，權喜，笑曰：「孤意解矣。顏氏之德，使人加親，豈謂此邪？」) Sanguozhi vol. 52.)

=== Yin Mo ===
On one occasion, Sun Quan got angry at Yin Mo (殷模), (Note: Not to be confused with Yin Mo (尹默).) a colonel serving under him, and accused him of committing an offence so severe that Sun Quan's other subjects were shocked. When his subjects pleaded with him to spare Yin Mo, Sun Quan became even more furious and he started quarrelling with them. Only Zhuge Jin remained silent. Sun Quan noticed it and asked him: "Ziyu, why are you the only person who hasn't spoken?" (Note: (權又怪校尉殷模，罪至不測。羣下多為之言，權怒益甚，與相反覆，惟瑾默然，權曰：「子瑜何獨不言？」) Sanguozhi vol. 52.) Zhuge Jin then left his seat, stood up and said:

"Yin Mo and I had no choice but to leave our native lands due to chaos and war. Lives were lost and we were forced to abandon our ancestors' burial grounds. We brought along our relatives – young and old – and overcame much adversity on our journey in search of a more civilised place to settle in. We owe it to you, My Lord, as you took us in as refugees and gave us a new means of livelihood. We ought to support, encourage and watch over each other as we strive hard to serve you and repay your great kindness. However, I am most guilty of failing to fulfil these obligations, and that resulted in Yin Mo letting you down. I have yet to admit my guilt and that is why I don't dare to speak up now." (Note: (瑾避席曰：「瑾與殷模等遭本州傾覆，生類殄盡。棄墳墓，攜老弱，披草萊，歸聖化，在流隷之中，蒙生成之福，不能躬相督厲，陳荅萬一，至令模孤負恩惠，自陷罪戾。臣謝過不暇，誠不敢有言。」) Sanguozhi vol. 52.)

Sun Quan felt deeply saddened after hearing Zhuge Jin's words. He then said: "I'll let him off because of you." (Note: (權聞之愴然，乃曰：「特為君赦之。」) Sanguozhi vol. 52.)

=== Yu Fan ===
When Yu Fan, one of Sun Quan's advisers, was banished to the remote Jiao Province for his disrespectful and offensive behaviour, Zhuge Jin not only repeatedly tried to persuade Sun Quan to pardon Yu Fan, but was also the only one among Sun Quan's subjects who spoke up for Yu Fan. (Note: (虞翻以狂直流徙，惟瑾屢為之說。) Sanguozhi vol. 52.)

Later, Yu Fan wrote a letter to a relative as follows:

"Zhuge (Jin) is sincere and kind. He saves lives in the same ways the gods do. I owe much to him when he spoke up for me and helped me safeguard my reputation. However, I have offended too many people and committed grave sins. (Sun Quan) hates me deeply. Even if someone like Qi Xi (祁奚) were to help me, I am not as virtuous as the people of the Yangshe clan (羊舌氏). Therefore, there is not much that can be done to save me." (Note: (翻與所親書曰：「諸葛敦仁，則天活物，比蒙清論，有以保分。惡積罪深，見忌殷重，雖有祁老之救，德無羊舌，解釋難兾也。」) Sanguozhi vol. 52.)

=== Zhou Yin ===
Sometime between 229 and 239, Zhou Yin (周胤), a son of Zhou Yu, committed an offence and was exiled to Luling Commandery (廬陵郡; around present-day Ji'an, Jiangxi) as punishment. In 239, Zhuge Jin and Bu Zhi wrote a memorial to Sun Quan, requesting for Zhou Yin to be pardoned and restored of his titles on account of his father's contributions. Sun Quan was reluctant to do so, as he noted the severity of Zhou Yin's offence and said that Zhou Yin had not shown any sign of remorse. However, after much urging from Zhuge Jin, Bu Zhi, Zhu Ran and Quan Cong, Sun Quan eventually agreed, but Zhou Yin had already died of illness in exile by then. (Note: (循弟胤， ... 黃龍元年，封都鄉侯，後以罪徙廬陵郡。赤烏二年，諸葛瑾、步隲連名上疏曰：「故將軍周瑜子胤， ... 亦何患乎！」瑾、隲表比上，朱然及全琮亦俱陳乞，權乃許之。會胤病死。) Sanguozhi vol. 54.)

== Family and descendants ==
During Zhuge Jin's lifetime, his family was one of the most illustrious families in China. While he was serving as General-in-Chief in Wu, his second brother Zhuge Liang served as the Imperial Chancellor of Wu's ally state, Shu, and their cousin Zhuge Dan served as a general in Wu and Shu's rival state, Wei. Two of Zhuge Jin's sons, Zhuge Ke and Zhuge Rong, also served as generals in Wu. (Note: (吳書曰：初，瑾為大將軍，而弟亮為蜀丞相，二子恪、融皆典戎馬，督領將帥，族弟誕又顯名於魏，一門三方為冠蓋，天下榮之。) Wu Shu annotation in Sanguozhi vol. 52.)

Although Zhuge Jin was not as talented and brilliant as his better known brother Zhuge Liang, he was noted for his exemplary conduct and virtuous character. After his wife died, he did not promote his favourite concubine to the status of his formal spouse to replace his deceased wife. He also did not show any favouritism towards his son(s) born to his concubine. (Note: (謹才略雖不及弟，而德行尤純。妻死不改娶，有所愛妾，生子不舉，其篤慎皆如此。) Wu Shu annotation in Sanguozhi vol. 52.)

Zhuge Jin's eldest son, Zhuge Ke, was not only famous in Wu, but also highly regarded by Sun Quan. However, Zhuge Jin disapproved of Zhuge Ke's behaviour, treated him coldly, and constantly worried that his eldest son would bring doom to their family. (Note: (瑾子恪，名盛當世，權深器異之；然瑾常嫌之，謂非保家之子，每以憂戚。) Sanguozhi vol. 52.) (Note: (恪父瑾闻之，亦以事终不逮，叹曰：“恪不大兴吾家，将大赤吾族也。”) Sanguozhi vol. 64. Zhuge Jin was commenting in light of Ke's plan to suppress the indigenous Shanyue tribes and recruit about 40,000 locals to serve as soldiers in Danyang Commandery.) After Zhuge Jin died, his third son Zhuge Rong inherited his peerage as the Marquis of Wanling (宛陵侯); Zhuge Ke did not inherit his father's peerage because he had already received a peerage of his own. Zhuge Rong also took control of the troops previously under his father's command at Gong'an County. (Note: (恪已自封侯，故弟融襲爵，攝兵業駐公安。) Sanguozhi vol. 52.)

In 253, Zhuge Ke, who briefly served as a regent for Sun Quan's successor Sun Liang, was overthrown and assassinated in a coup d'état by Sun Jun, a distant relative of Sun Liang. Zhuge Ke's two surviving sons, along with Zhuge Rong and Zhuge Rong's three sons, as well as other members of Zhuge Ke's extended family, were rounded up and executed.

Zhuge Jin's second son, Zhuge Qiao, was adopted by his uncle Zhuge Liang because Zhuge Liang initially had no son and needed a male heir. Zhuge Qiao came to serve in Shu and died in 228. (Note: The Sanguozhi stated that Zhuge Qiao died at the age of 25 (by East Asian age reckoning) in the 1st year of the Jianxing era (223-237) of Liu Shan's reign. However, some scholars argued that Zhuge Liang deployed Zhuge Qiao in an army to Hanzhong in 227, and proved the error in recording. Qing-era scholar He Zhuo commented that the character “元" ("first") was supposed to be the character “六" ("six"), and that Zhuge Qiao's death year should be in the 6th year of the Jianxing era. By calculation, Zhuge Qiao's birth year should be around 204.) His son, Zhuge Pan (諸葛攀), also served as an official in Shu. However, after Zhuge Jin's descendants were purged in 253, Zhuge Pan reverted to his original lineage and moved to Wu to continue Zhuge Jin's bloodline there. However, Zhuge Pan was noted to have died young as well. (Note: (喬字伯松，亮兄瑾之第二子也，本字仲慎。 ... 初，亮未有子，求喬為嗣，瑾啟孫權遣喬來西，亮以喬為己適子，故易其字焉。 ... 子攀，官至行護軍翊武將軍，亦早卒。諸葛恪見誅於吳，子孫皆盡，而亮自有冑裔，故攀還復為瑾後。) Sanguozhi vol. 35.) In 264, Zhuge Pan's son Zhuge Xian (諸葛显), who somehow ended up in Wei, was moved to Hedong Commandery along with Zhuge Zhan's second son Zhuge Jing (諸葛京). (Note: (次子京及攀子显等，咸熙元年内移河东。) Sanguozhi vol. 35.) Jin-era calligrapher Wang Xizhi wrote that he once met Zhuge Xian at Jiankang, and asked him about the situation in Shu. Zhuge replied that Chengdu's city walls, houses and many other buildings were from the Qin era, where they were built by Sima Cuo.

Zhang Cheng, a general serving under Sun Quan, was a friend of Zhuge Jin. When his wife died, his father Zhang Zhao suggested that he marry Zhuge Jin's daughter. Zhang Cheng initially felt awkward about becoming his friend's son-in-law, but eventually agreed after Sun Quan persuaded him to do so. Zhang Cheng and Zhuge Jin's daughter had a daughter, Consort Zhang (張妃), who married Sun Quan's third son Sun He. (Note: (初，承喪妻，昭欲為索諸葛瑾女，承以相與有好，難之，權聞而勸焉，遂為婚。生女，權為子和納之。) Sanguozhi vol. 52.)

== See also ==
- Lists of people of the Three Kingdoms
