= Lu Kai =

State of Eastern Wu chancellor and general (198-c.270)

- 陸凱

Left Imperial Chancellor (左丞相) (alongside Wan Yu)
- In office September or October 266 – December 269 or January 270
- Monarch: Sun Hao
- Preceded by: Puyang Xing
- Succeeded by: Zhang Ti

Governor of Jing Province (荊州牧)
- In office 264 – September or October 266
- Monarch: Sun Hao

Senior General Who Guards the West (鎮西大將軍)
- In office 264 – September or October 266
- Monarch: Sun Hao

General Who Attacks the North (征北將軍)
- In office 258 – 264
- Monarch: Sun Xiu

General Who Pacifies Distant Lands (綏遠將軍)
- In office 255 – 258
- Monarch: Sun Liang

General Who Defeats Wei (盪魏將軍)
- In office 255 – 258
- Monarch: Sun Liang

Personal details
- Born: 198 Suzhou, Jiangsu
- Died: December 269 or January 270 (aged 71) (Note: Sun Hao's biography in the Sanguozhi recorded that Lu Kai died in the 11th month of the 1st year of the Jianheng era of Sun Hao's reign. This month corresponds to 11 December 269 to 8 January 270 in the Gregorian calendar. Lu Kai's biography in the same work recorded that he was 72 (by East Asian reckoning) when he died.) Ezhou, Hubei
- Children: Lu Yi
- Relatives: Lu Yin (younger brother); Lu Xun (relative); Lu Mao (relative)
- Occupation: Military general, politician
- Courtesy name: Jingfeng (敬風)
- Peerage: Marquis of Jiaxing (嘉興侯)
- Father: Unknown (same generation cousin of Lu Xun)

Lu Kai (198 – December 269 or January 270), courtesy name Jingfeng, was the ninth Imperial Chancellor (as left Imperial Chancellor alongside Wan Yu) of the state of Eastern Wu during the Three Kingdoms period of China. Born in the influential Lu clan of the Wu region towards the end of the Eastern Han dynasty, Lu Kai started his career around the beginning of the Three Kingdoms period as a county chief and later a military officer under Sun Quan, the founding emperor of Eastern Wu. During the reign of Sun Liang, he participated in some battles against bandits and Eastern Wu's rival state Cao Wei, and was promoted to the rank of General. Throughout the reign of Sun Xiu and early reign of Sun Hao, Lu Kai continued to hold military commands until September or October 266, when Sun Hao appointed him and Wan Yu as the Left and Right Imperial Chancellors of Eastern Wu respectively. Well known for being outspoken and candid, Lu Kai strongly objected to Sun Hao's decision to move the imperial capital from Jianye (present-day Nanjing, Jiangsu) to Wuchang (present-day Ezhou, Hubei) in 265, attempted to dissuade Sun Hao from going to war with the Jin dynasty that replaced the Cao Wei state in 266, and spoke up against Sun Hao's cruel and extravagant ways on numerous occasions. Although Sun Hao deeply resented Lu Kai for openly defying him, he tolerated Lu Kai because Lu Kai held an important office and also because he did not want to antagonise the Lu clan. After Lu Kai's death, Sun Hao sent his family away to a distant commandery in the south.

== Family background ==
Lu Kai was from Wu County, Wu Commandery, which is present-day Suzhou, Jiangsu. The Lu clan, which he was from, was one of the four most influential clans in Wu Commandery and also in the Jiangdong (or Wu) region at the time. (Note: The four great clans of Wu Commandery were the Gu (顧), Lu (陸), Zhu (朱) and Zhang (張) clans. The four great clans of the Jiangdong region were the Gu (顧), Lu (陸), Yu (虞) and Wei (魏) clans. Some notable members from each clan were: Gu Yong, Gu Shao and Gu Tan of the Gu clan; Lu Xun, Lu Ji and Lu Kai of the Lu clan; Zhu Huan and Zhu Ju of the Zhu clan; Zhang Wen of the Zhang clan; Yu Fan of the Yu clan; and Wei Teng (魏騰) of the Wei clan.) This Lu clan were descendants of Tian Tong (田通), a son of King Xuan of Qi, King Xuan enfeoffed Tian Tong at Lu (陸; in modern Laoling, Shandong), Tian Tong adopted Lu as his surname. Lu Kai was a son of a same generation cousin of Lu Xun, the third Imperial Chancellor of Eastern Wu.

== Service under Sun Quan ==
Lu Kai started his career around the time Sun Quan established the independent state of Eastern Wu in 222 near the beginning of the Three Kingdoms period. He first served as the Chief of Yongxing County (永興縣; present-day Xiaoshan District, Hangzhou, Zhejiang) and later as the Chief of Zhuji County, before he was commissioned as a Commandant Who Establishes Martial Might (建武都尉) and given command of troops. While serving in the military, Lu Kai was often seen reading books. He was particularly interested in the Taixuanjing and fortune-telling / divination.

During the Chiwu era (238–251) of Sun Quan's reign, Lu Kai was appointed as the Administrator (太守) of Dan'er Commandery (儋耳郡; around present-day Danzhou, Hainan). He led Wu forces to attack Zhuya (朱崖; present-day Haikou, Hainan) and succeeded in conquering it for Wu. As a reward for his achievement, he was promoted from Commandant to Colonel under the title "Colonel Who Establishes Martial Might" (建武校尉).

== Service under Sun Liang ==
In 255, during the reign of the second Wu emperor Sun Liang, Lu Kai led Wu forces to attack bandits led by Chen Bi (陳毖) in Lingling Commandery (零陵郡; around present-day Yongzhou, Hunan) and succeeded in eliminating Chen Bi and the bandits. He was then promoted to Lieutenant-General (偏將軍) and appointed as the Area Commander of Baqiu (巴丘; present-day Yueyang, Hunan), in addition to being enfeoffed as a Marquis of a Chief District (都鄉侯). He was subsequently reassigned to serve as the Area Commander of the Right Section of Wuchang (武昌; present-day Ezhou, Hubei).

During Sun Liang's reign, Lu Kai participated in a military campaign against Wu's rival state, Wei, at Shouchun (壽春; present-day Shou County, Anhui). After he returned from the Shouchun campaign, he was promoted to the rank of General, first under the title "General Who Defeats Wei" (盪魏將軍) and later "General Who Pacifies Distant Lands" (綏遠將軍).

== Service under Sun Xiu ==
After Sun Xiu came to the throne on 30 November 258, he appointed Lu Kai as General Who Attacks the North (征北將軍) and granted him the nominal appointment of Governor of Yu Province, which was actually the territory of Wu's rival state Wei.

== Service under Sun Hao ==
When Sun Hao became emperor of Wu on 3 September 264 following Sun Xiu's death, he reassigned Lu Kai to the position of General Who Guards the West (鎮西大將軍), granted him the appointment of Governor of Jing Province, and ordered him to station at Baqiu (巴丘; present-day Yueyang, Hunan). He also elevated Lu Kai from the status of a district marquis to a county marquis under the title "Marquis of Jiaxing" (嘉興侯).

=== Advising Sun Hao against relocating the imperial capital ===
In late September or October 265, Sun Hao relocated the Wu imperial capital from Jianye (present-day Nanjing, Jiangsu) to Wuchang (武昌; present-day Ezhou, Hubei). His decision to relocate the imperial capital became a heavy burden on the people of Yang Province as they were hard-pressed into providing supplies and resources for the relocation process. At the same time, the Wu government's numerous policy failures had also imposed hardships on the people and forced them into severe poverty. Around this time, Lu Kai wrote a memorial to Sun Hao to dissuade him from relocating the imperial capital, and to advise him to rule with benevolence. (Note: See this section for the full text of Lu Kai's memorial.)

=== Dissuading Sun Hao from attacking the Jin dynasty ===
In February or March 266, Sun Hao sent Ding Zhong (丁忠) as his emissary to make peace with the Jin dynasty, which replaced Wu's rival state Wei on 4 February 266. After Ding Zhong returned from his mission, he urged Sun Hao to launch an attack on the Jin dynasty's Yiyang Commandery (弋陽郡; around present-day Xinyang, Henan) because he saw that the Jin defences were inadequate. When Sun Hao called for an imperial court session to discuss this issue, Lu Kai spoke up:

"War is meant to be a last resort. Since the beginning of the Three Kingdoms period, we have constantly fought battles and there has never been a year when everyone was able to live in peace. Now, our powerful enemy has recently conquered Bashu and made solid territorial gains, yet they send an emissary to meet us and offer to make peace with us. This isn't because they need our help. Our enemy is very powerful at the moment, yet we want to risk the odds for a victory? I don't see anything we can gain out of this."

The Wu general Liu Zuan (劉纂) urged Sun Hao to seize this opportunity to launch an attack, and suggested that they send spies to assess the situation in Yiyang Commandery first. Although Sun Hao wanted to heed Liu Zuan's suggestion, he eventually dropped the idea after considering the recent fall of Wu's ally state Shu in 263.

=== As Left Imperial Chancellor ===
Around September or October 266, Sun Hao appointed Lu Kai as Left Imperial Chancellor (左丞相) and Wan Yu as Right Imperial Chancellor (右丞相).

As Sun Hao was known for his dislike of receiving feedback about himself, his subjects did not dare to defy him when they spoke to him. Lu Kai, however, told the emperor: "If a ruler and his subjects don't understand each other, when something unexpected happens, everyone will be at a loss on what to do." Sun Hao listened to Lu Kai and allowed feedback from him.

At the time, Sun Hao had an attendant, He Ding (何定), who was notorious for fawning on the emperor, speaking ill of officials behind their backs, and giving unfair preferential treatment to those who were close to him. Lu Kai once reprimanded him:

"Look at those subjects who didn't serve their rulers with loyalty, and who caused turmoil and corruption in the government. Did they meet with a good end? Why do you engage in flattery and slander, and block the Emperor from seeing and hearing on his own? You better mend your ways. If not, I believe you will meet with an unforeseen disaster."

He Ding bore a grudge against Lu Kai for this, and he constantly thought of ways to get back at Lu Kai. However, Lu Kai remained unfazed and continued to perform his duties in a professional and impartial manner. He continued to show his sincerity and loyalty towards Sun Hao by being candid and not mincing his words whenever he gave advice to the emperor.

=== Alleged plot to overthrow Sun Hao ===
According to one account, sometime in January or early February 267, Lu Kai plotted with Ding Feng and Ding Gu (丁固) to overthrow Sun Hao while he was visiting the imperial ancestral temple, and replace him with Sun Xiu's son. Lu Kai then secretly instructed an official to recommend Ding Feng to lead the 3,000 imperial guards escorting Sun Hao to the temple. However, Sun Hao rejected the suggestion and chose Liu Ping (留平) instead. Lu Kai and the others then contacted Liu Ping and asked him to join the plot. Although Liu Ping refused to participate, he also promised them that he would not reveal anything. Without Liu Ping's help, the plot could not be carried out. Around the same time, an imperial clerk Chen Miao (陳苗) warned Sun Hao that there were ominous signs (e.g. dark clouds but no rain, winds changing direction) so Sun Hao, being superstitious, ordered his guards to be on high alert.

The Wu Lu (吳錄) recorded that Lu Kai had instructed his son Lu Yi (陸禕) to secretly contact Liu Ping and ask him to join their plot. However, before Lu Yi could tell him, Liu Ping, who was not on good terms with Ding Feng, smiled and told Lu Yi: "I heard that a wild boar broke into Ding Feng's camp. That is a bad omen." Lu Yi thought that Liu Ping already knew, so he became fearful and did not dare to say anything about the plot.

=== Death ===
When Lu Kai became critically ill in 269, Sun Hao sent Dong Chao (董朝), the Prefect of the Palace Writers, to visit Lu Kai and hear his last words. Lu Kai said:

"He Ding can't be trusted. He should be assigned to somewhere away from the Imperial Capital; he shouldn't be entrusted with state affairs. Xi Xi, a low-level official, has set up fields in the artificial lake with the aim of reviving the project previously started by Yan Mi. Your Majesty shouldn't listen to him. Yao Xin, Lou Xuan, He Shao, Zhang Ti, Guo Chuo, Xue Ying and Teng Xiu, as well as my relatives Lu Xi and Lu Kang, are either morally upright, loyal, diligent or exceptionally brilliant. They can serve as pillars of the state and role models for society. I hope that Your Majesty will pay greater attention to them and carefully consider their advice, consult them on important issues, and allow them to play their respective roles accordingly, so as to let them help Your Majesty cover up whatever flaws you may have."

Lu Kai died sometime between 11 December 269 and 8 January 270 at the age of 72 (by East Asian age reckoning).

== Family ==
Lu Kai's son, Lu Yi (陸禕), also served in the state of Eastern Wu like his father. He started his career as a Gentleman of the Yellow Gate (黃門侍郎) before enlisting in the Wu army and rising through the ranks to become a Lieutenant-General (偏將軍). After his father's death, Lu Yi was reassigned to serve in the imperial palace, where he became an attendant to the crown prince.

During this time, the state historian Hua He wrote a memorial to the emperor Sun Hao as follows: "Lu Yi is physically tough, exceptionally talented, and strong in willpower. He will make a brilliant military commander; even Lu Su could not have been better than him. When he was summoned to the Imperial Capital, he passed by Wuchang but he did not stop to visit his family there and did not take any military equipment and supplies from Wuchang. He shows decisiveness and determination in leading troops, and great integrity in performing his duties. Xiakou is a strategic location near the border that will come under attack by enemy forces, so we need a competent commander to lead the defence. After careful consideration, I think there is no better person suitable for this task than Lu Yi."

When Lu Kai was still alive, he was known for being outspoken and critical of Sun Hao, and for defying the emperor's will on a number of occasions. As a result, Sun Hao secretly bore a grudge against him. At the same time, He Ding (何定), who also hated Lu Kai, constantly spoke ill of Lu Kai in front of the emperor. Sun Hao had long considered getting rid of Lu Kai, but he could not do so because of two reasons. First, Lu Kai held an important office as Left Imperial Chancellor so Sun Hao needed his help to keep the government functioning. Second, Lu Kai's relative Lu Kang was a senior general guarding the border between Eastern Wu and the Jin dynasty, so Sun Hao did not want to antagonise Lu Kang by harming Lu Kai. Therefore, even though Sun Hao deeply resented Lu Kai, he tolerated Lu Kai all these years. After Lu Kai died, Sun Hao sent his family away to the distant Jian'an Commandery (建安郡; covering parts of present-day Fujian).

Lu Kai had a younger brother, Lu Yin, who served as a military general in Eastern Wu.

== Lu Kai's writings ==
=== Memorial on relocating the imperial capital and benevolent rule ===
Lu Kai then wrote this memorial to Sun Hao around September or October 265 to dissuade the emperor from relocating the imperial capital from Jianye (present-day Nanjing, Jiangsu) to Wuchang (武昌; present-day Ezhou, Hubei), and to advise him to rule with benevolence instead of tyranny. A rough translation of the memorial is as follows:

"I heard that a proper ruler will bring joy and pleasure to his people; an improper ruler will seek joy and pleasure only for himself. One who makes the people happy will enjoy everlasting happiness; one who cares only about his own happiness will not last long. As the people are the foundation of a state, their needs are a top priority and their lives should be valued. When the people are at peace, the ruler will be at peace too; when the people are happy, the ruler will be happy too. In recent years, Your Majesty's prestige has been damaged by acts of tyranny like those of Jie and Zhou, Your Majesty's judgment has been clouded by people with evil and wild ambitions, and Your Majesty's means of showing kindness have been blocked. There are no natural disasters yet the people are living in poverty. There have been no major occurrences yet the treasury is empty. Your Majesty has made numerous grave mistakes by punishing the innocent and rewarding the undeserving. Heaven is creating problems for us because it is unhappy with your actions. I am deeply saddened and worried when I see officials using flattery to gain Your Majesty's favour, increasing their personal wealth by exploiting the people, leading Your Majesty astray from the path of righteousness, and polluting government and society with corruption. Since our neighbouring state wants to establish friendly relations with us and there are no conflicts at the borders, we should do our best to relieve the people's burdens, give them time to rest and recuperate, build up a strong treasury, and wait for an opportunity to arise. We should not be defying Heaven's will, disturbing the people and not letting them have their peace, and creating so much pain and suffering for both young and old. This is not the way to preserve a state's existence and grow a population.

I heard that one's fortune depends on Heaven's will just like how a shadow depends on the object it originates from, and how an echo depends on the sound created. When the object moves, the shadow moves too; when the object stops, the shadow stops too. The fortune of a state depends on its constituent elements and how they interact with each other; words do not determine one's fortune. In the past, the Qin dynasty lost the Empire because its rewards were too meagre and its punishments were too harsh, resulting in a huge imbalance in its justice system. The ruler exploited the people for his own benefit, allowed sensual pleasures to cloud his judgment, and became complacent because of his wealth. Evil and corrupt people gained power, while wise and virtuous people went into hiding and seclusion. The people lived in constant fear and trepidation, and the Empire was stricken with poverty. These sowed the seeds for the downfall of the Qin dynasty. The Han dynasty prospered because the ruler led by example, earned the people's trust through his actions, listened to the advice of the wise and virtuous, and showed kindness to even the people living in the wilderness. He personally visited hermits and recruited them to serve under him, sought advice from people of a wide range of backgrounds, and regularly toured places to see how his people are doing. In doing so, he established himself as a benevolent and wise ruler. These lessons from history can serve as a testament to what I mentioned earlier.

Not too long ago, as the Han dynasty weakened and declined, the Three Kingdoms emerged. This was followed by the collapse of order in Wei, which was then replaced by the Jin dynasty. Yi Province is surrounded by natural defences and guarded by a strong military. It can hold out very well and preserve itself even if it were to shut its doors to the outside world. Yet, Liu Shan allowed disorder and absurdity to flourish when he failed to give out rewards and punishments fairly, and occupied himself with extravagance and self-indulgence. Even when Shu had no exigencies to deal with, its manpower and resources had already been heavily depleted and drained. That was how it ended up being conquered by the Jin dynasty, and how its ruler and his subjects became captives. These are lessons and examples from more recent history.

I may not understand the great principles well, may not write well enough to convey my intentions, may not be learned and intelligent, and I have no extravagant hopes. I only feel that it is a pity for Your Majesty to treat the people like this. I only truthfully report what I have seen and heard about the people's suffering and corruption in the administration. I sincerely hope that Your Majesty will put an end to the wasteful use of resources and reduce unnecessary corvée and labour, and rule with benevolence instead of tyranny.

On another point, Wuchang is a dangerous and barren place. It is not a suitable location for the Imperial Capital; it is not the place to grow our population and promote internal stability. Those who live on water fear that their homes will sink, while those who live in the mountains are living in dangerous terrain. There is a children's rhyme which goes, 'We would rather drink water from Jianye than consume fish from Wuchang; we would rather die in Jianye than live in Wuchang.' I heard that the stars have shifted and the yinghuo star will cause doom. The children's rhyme is born out of Heaven's will. That is why a peaceful life stands in contrast to death. Heaven's will is very clear. We know that the people are suffering.

I heard that if a state does not have at least three years' worth of supplies, it cannot be considered a state. As of now, we do not have even one year's worth of supplies. It is the fault of Your Majesty's subjects. The ministers hold high-ranking positions and earn huge incomes for their families, yet they do not serve with the utmost loyalty and do their best to save the State. Instead, they focus on using flattery and small gifts to earn Your Majesty's favour. They are doing so at the expense of exploiting the people; what they are doing is not in Your Majesty's interest. Since Sun Hong started implementing his idea of building up militias, agriculture has been largely neglected and fathers have been separated from their sons. Our daily expenses on feeding the militias have been increasing, while our stockpiles of food supplies are gradually being depleted. The people are already very resentful. The State is gradually stripping itself bare, without any hope of reversing this trend. The people are poor and starving, and they have even resorted to selling their own children. As tax rates continue to remain high, the people will eventually be pushed to the extreme. This is the fault of local officials, who do not do anything to protect the people and prevent them from being harmed. Besides, there are also salt tax collectors who not only show no concern for the people, but also take advantage of them by exploiting and bullying them. The people are suffering at both ends, while our economy is also weakening. All this will bring nothing but harm to our State. I hope that Your Majesty will get rid of these corrupt officials, alleviate the people from their suffering and restore peace to their lives. This is equivalent to taking aquatic life out of polluted waters, and rescuing animals caught in traps and nets. In doing so, people from all corners of the Empire will come to join us. When that happens, we can maintain a stable population and preserve the existence of this State established by the Previous Emperor.

I heard that overindulgence in sensual pleasures will cause one's senses of hearing and sight to weaken. This will not only be non-beneficial to a ruler, but also bring great harm to the state. During the Previous Emperor's reign, there were less than 100 women in the palace including all the Emperor's consorts and servants. Yet, we had abundant food supplies and a rich treasury. Following the Previous Emperor's passing, when the Young Emperor and Emperor Jing successively came to the throne, they began to adopt extravagant lifestyles instead of following in the Previous Emperor's footsteps. I heard that there are over 1,000 women in the palace now including servants and women who have nothing to do. From our calculations, they not only cannot contribute to increasing the State's wealth, but also take up an unnecessary portion of the State's expenses. This will not be helpful to the State in the long term if it continues year after year. I hope that Your Majesty will free these women and let them marry men who are still single. In this way, Your Majesty will be following the will of both Heaven and the people, and bringing happiness to everyone.

I heard that King Tang of Shang recruited talents from among merchants, Duke Huan of Qi recruited talents from among chariot and carriage drivers, King Wu of Zhou recruited talents from among woodcutters, and the Han dynasty recruited talents from among slaves. A wise ruler recruits people from all walks of life to serve under him as long as they are brilliant and virtuous. That was how such rulers built their glorious legacies and left their names in history. These rulers see beyond the superficial and refrain from recruiting people who lack substance but are good at flattery and bragging. I see that many of Your Majesty's close subjects are actually not fit for their current appointments and not competent enough to assume the responsibilities they are holding. They not only do not serve the State well, but also form factions to further their own interests, and suppress talents or harm the virtuous. I hope that Your Majesty will be more mindful and selective in appointing officials, so that they will know their places and faithfully perform their duties accordingly. The governors and generals should continue to defend and guard the Imperial Capital and their respective jurisdictions, while the ministers and secretaries will strive hard to promote good governance and civil culture. In doing so, they will be able to assist Your Majesty in ruling this State and bringing peace and prosperity to the people. If they all remain loyal and perform their roles well, Your Majesty will have nothing to worry about. When that happens, everyone will be singing praises of Your Majesty and heralding the arrival of a golden age in history. I hope that Your Majesty will carefully consider the points that I, in my most humble opinion, have presented in this memorial.

=== Memorial on 20 ways Sun Hao deviated from Sun Quan's practices ===
Chen Shou, the third-century historian who wrote Lu Kai's biography in the Sanguozhi, mentioned that during his research on information about Lu Kai, he came across a memorial allegedly written by Lu Kai to Sun Hao. This memorial originated from sources in Jing and Yang provinces. However, when Chen Shou cross-checked with sources from the Wu region, he was unable to verify the authenticity of the memorial. Nevertheless, Chen Shou believed that the memorial was authentic from its tone and writing style. He theorised that Lu Kai most probably wrote the memorial but did not present it to Sun Hao and kept it hidden until he finally decided to show it to Dong Chao (董朝) before his death. Chen Shou did not include the memorial in the main text of Lu Kai's biography because of its dubious origin. However, he was impressed after reading the memorial, and believed that it could serve as a lesson for future rulers, hence he included it as an addendum at the end of Lu Kai's biography.

The memorial was Lu Kai's response to a message from Sun Hao relayed to him by Zhao Qin (趙欽), one of Sun Hao's close attendants, when Lu Kai strongly opposed Sun Hao's decision to relocate the imperial capital from Jianye (present-day Nanjing, Jiangsu) to Wuchang (present-day Ezhou, Hubei). The message was: "I will definitely follow in the Previous Emperor's footsteps. What is wrong with that? What you told me doesn't make sense. I decided to move the Imperial Capital because the Imperial Palace in Jianye isn't an auspicious location. Besides, the buildings in the western part of the Imperial Palace are already falling apart. That is why all the more I should relocate the Imperial Capital. What makes you think I shouldn't do that?"

Lu Kai replied:

"Since Your Majesty took over the reins of power, I noticed that yin and yang are not well-balanced, the five stars are misaligned, officeholders are not faithfully performing their duties, and corrupt officials are collaborating to pursue their own interests. This is because Your Majesty did not follow in the Previous Emperor's footsteps. (Note: The Jiang Biao Zhuan recorded that Lu Kai also wrote: "I kneel down and pay my fullest attention when I receive clear orders from Your Majesty. Yet, how difficult it is for me to make sense of what is going on in Your Majesty's heart and mind!") A ruler's rise to eminence depends on Heaven's will and his own virtues. It has nothing to do with the state of his palace. Your Majesty does not seek counsel from your subjects and instead does as you please. The troops are suffering from displacement, sorrow and fear. When one offends Heaven and Earth, Heaven and Earth will bring natural disasters and show signs in the form of children's rhymes. Even if Your Majesty is able to live peacefully, the people will be living in poverty and suffering. How then can you rule? This is the first way Your Majesty deviated from the Previous Emperor's practices.

I heard that virtuous people serve as the foundation of a state. The Xia dynasty executed Longfeng, while the Shang dynasty promoted Yi Zhi. These examples from history can serve as lessons for the present. Central Regular Attendant Wang Fan is knowledgeable, understanding, loyal and faithful. He is an important pillar of society and just like the Longfeng of Wu. Your Majesty hates and resents him for criticising you and opposing your decisions, and so you had him executed with his head displayed in court and his body abandoned in the streets. Everyone feels deeply saddened; those who are wiser express grief and worry that Your Majesty will be like Fuchai of Wu. The Previous Emperor cherished virtuous people while Your Majesty does the exact opposite. This is the second way Your Majesty deviated from the Previous Emperor's practices.

I heard that a chancellor is a pillar of his state. He must be of strong character. That was why the Han dynasty had Xiao He and Cao Shen, while the Previous Emperor had Gu Yong and Bu Zhi. Wan Yu is untalented and of mediocre calibre. He was a family servant in the past, but now he has made it into the Imperial Palace. He has received favours greater than he could ask for, and held positions higher than those suited for someone of his ability. Your Majesty favours him for trivial reasons, does not care whether he has great ambitions, allows him to occupy a prestigious position only for the virtuous and talented, and lets him enjoy privileges that should be accorded only to senior and long-serving officials. The virtuous and talented feel frustrated and disappointed, while intelligent men feel shocked and unwelcome. This is the third way Your Majesty deviated from the Previous Emperor's practices.

The Previous Emperor loved his people as he loved his children. He arranged for single men to get married, provided clothing to those who did not have sufficient clothing, and arranged proper burials for people whose remains were abandoned. Your Majesty does the exact opposite. This is the fourth way Your Majesty deviated from the Previous Emperor's practices.

In the past, Jie and Zhou met their downfalls because of evil women, while the turmoil during You and Li's reigns started with them showing favouritism towards their concubines. The Previous Emperor used these historical examples to remind himself not to make the same mistakes as them. That was why he distanced himself from sexual indulgences, and why he had no unmarried women in his palace. As of now, Your Majesty has tens of thousands of women in your palace who have no proper status. While these women suffer inside the palace, there are many unmarried and widowed men outside the palace in need of wives. That is why we are experiencing all these troubles now. This is the fifth way Your Majesty deviated from the Previous Emperor's practices.

Although the Previous Emperor worked tirelessly to keep himself updated of daily state affairs, he never put aside his worries that mishaps could happen. Since Your Majesty ascended the throne, you have been indulging in entertainment and sex. This resulted in the neglect of state affairs and allowed corruption to breed within the government. This is the sixth way Your Majesty deviated from the Previous Emperor's practices.

The Previous Emperor saw frugality as a virtue. He never wore expensive clothes, had no extravagant structures in the palace, and owned no elaborately designed possessions. That was why the State was wealthy, the people were well-sustained, and crime rates were low. Your Majesty diverts resources away from the provinces and commanderies to build expensive structures and fill your palace with treasures. It is a huge waste of manpower and funds. This is the seventh way Your Majesty deviated from the Previous Emperor's practices.

The Previous Emperor relied on the Gu, Lu, Zhu and Zhang clans for foreign policy issues, and on Hu Zong and Xue Zong for domestic policy issues. That was why the State was able to prolong its existence, enjoy long-term stability and peace, and remain free of corruption. Today, incompetent people are in charge of foreign and domestic policy issues. The Previous Emperor ignores petty officials like Chen Sheng and Cao Fu, while Your Majesty favours them. This is the eighth way Your Majesty deviated from the Previous Emperor's practices.

Whenever the Previous Emperor hosted parties for his subjects, he would limit the amount of alcohol served. His subjects never had to worry about problems caused by negligence or oversight. All of them could clearly and fully present to him whatever ideas and opinions they had. Your Majesty controls your subjects by imposing your authority upon them, and makes them feel fearful when you allow them to consume unlimited amounts of alcohol. Alcohol can be used to enhance people's moods in social settings. However, over-consumption of alcohol can lead to moral decadence. That would be no different from the overnight drinking parties hosted by the Shang dynasty's King Zhou. This is the ninth way Your Majesty deviated from the Previous Emperor's practices.

In the past, the Han dynasty's Emperors Huan and Ling placed great faith in their eunuchs, and lost the hearts of the people as a result. As of now, Your Majesty gives out great rewards to eunuchs like Gao Tong, Zhan Lian and Yang Du, and even puts them in command of active troops. If there is an emergency at the border and war breaks out, it is very obvious that these people do not have the ability to lead the troops to resist an invasion. This is the tenth way Your Majesty deviated from the Previous Emperor's practices.

As of now, the Imperial Palace is already fully packed with single women, yet Your Majesty's attendants and eunuchs still travel around the provinces and commanderies placing notices and calling local officials to send more single women to serve in the Imperial Palace. The more affluent households can use their wealth to bribe the officials and protect their daughters, but the poorer families have their daughters forcibly taken away from them. The people are feel very outraged and resentful when they are separated from their daughters for good. This is the eleventh way Your Majesty deviated from the Previous Emperor's practices.

When the Previous Emperor was still alive, he was very concerned about the upbringing and education of his children. If he had to employ a wet nurse and her husband is away on active duty, he would ensure that they are well-paid and their needs are taken care of. From time to time, he would also allow the wet nurse to take leave to visit her family. He treated them as if they were his children. The current situation is far from what it was like in the past. Couples are separated from each other, men are forced to serve as soldiers or labourers, and their children die early as they lack proper care. That is why the population is shrinking. This is the twelfth way Your Majesty deviated from the Previous Emperor's practices.

The Previous Emperor once said, 'A state's existence depends on its people. The people's most important need is food, followed by clothing. I always bear these three points in mind.' What he said is far from what is happening today. Agriculture and industry have been neglected. This is the thirteenth way Your Majesty deviated from the Previous Emperor's practices.

When the Previous Emperor selected candidates to serve in his administration, he did not discriminate against anyone on the basis of his background. He appointed them as officials according to their abilities, and assessed them based on how well they performed in office. The officials who recommended talents to serve in the government exercised due diligence and caution, while those who accepted offers to serve in the government behaved humbly and faithfully. The situation now is so different from the past. People who appear talented on the outside but lack substance on the inside get recommended to serve in the government, while those who form factions to pursue their own interests get ahead of others. This is the fourteenth way Your Majesty deviated from the Previous Emperor's practices.

The soldiers of the Previous Emperor's time had no other duties besides military service. They were allowed to grow crops in spring and collect the harvest in autumn. When war breaks out along the border, they take up arms and fight to the death to defend the State. The soldiers of today are forced to perform various forms of labour in addition to military service, and the government does not ensure that they are well-compensated and their needs taken care of. This is the fifteenth way Your Majesty deviated from the Previous Emperor's practices.

Rewards are meant to motivate people to do well, while punishments are meant to deter people from committing evil. If rewards and punishments are not given out fairly, people will lose faith in the authorities. As of now, the soldiers who died while defending our borders are not honoured for their sacrifices and their families do not receive compensation, while the labourers do not get remunerated for their hard work. This is the sixteenth way Your Majesty deviated from the Previous Emperor's practices.

As of now, the bureaucracies of local administrations are getting far too complicated. The problem is compounded when officials from the central government are dispatched to perform their duties in local administrations. How can the people put up with it when the ratio of officials to commoners is ten to one? During Emperor Jing's reign, a rebellion broke out in Jiaozhi precisely because there were too many officials governing that region. Your Majesty should learn from Emperor Jing's mistake. This is the seventeenth way Your Majesty deviated from the Previous Emperor's practices.

The intelligence agency is the enemy of both officials and commoners. In his later years, although the Previous Emperor set up an intelligence agency with Lü Yi and Qian Qin in charge, he realised his mistake, eliminated them and apologised to the people. As of now, Your Majesty reestablishes the audit bureau and allows spies to freely report on others. This is the eighteenth way Your Majesty deviated from the Previous Emperor's practices.

During the Previous Emperor's reign, officials held office for a long time and proved themselves through merit before they got promoted. As of now, many local officials do not hold office long enough before they get promoted or reassigned elsewhere. As a result of such frequent changes, officials have to frequently travel from one location to another. The process is a clear example of how resources and manpower are wasted and not put to good use. This is the nineteenth way Your Majesty deviated from the Previous Emperor's practices.

When the Previous Emperor reviewed criminal cases, he often closely examined the details of each case and reconsidered them from different perspectives. As a result, there were no wrongful convictions and executions. As of now, Your Majesty is doing the exact opposite. This is the twentieth way Your Majesty deviated from the Previous Emperor's practices.

If Your Majesty thinks what I said should be recorded, then this memorial can be kept in the archives. If Your Majesty thinks what I said is false, then you can punish me for my mistake. I hope Your Majesty will pay close attention to my words.

=== Other memorials ===
The Jiang Biao Zhuan (江表傳) recorded two other memorials written by Lu Kai to Sun Hao. Lu Kai wrote the first memorial to urge Sun Hao to mend his ways when he foresaw that Sun Hao would meet his downfall because of his cruelty and extravagance. He wrote the second memorial to dissuade Sun Hao from proceeding with his expensive palace construction/renovation project after Sun Hao refused to listen to him when he first spoke up.

== See also ==
- Lists of people of the Three Kingdoms
