= Wang Fan =

Chinese astronomer, mathematician and official (228–266)

- 王蕃

Regular Attendant (常侍)
- In office 264 or after – 266
- Monarch: Sun Hao

Chief Commandant of Escorting Cavalry (駙馬都尉)
- In office 258 or after – ?
- Monarch: Sun Xiu

Central Regular Mounted Attendant (散騎中常侍)
- In office 258 or after – ?
- Monarch: Sun Xiu

Gentleman of Writing (尚書郎)
- In office ?–?
- Monarch: Sun Quan / Sun Liang

Personal details
- Born: 228 Lujiang County, Anhui
- Died: 266 (aged 38)
- Relations: Wang Zhu (brother); Wang Yan (brother)
- Occupation: Astronomer, mathematician, politician, writer
- Courtesy name: Yongyuan (永元)

Wang Fan (228–266), courtesy name Yongyuan, was a Chinese astronomer, mathematician, politician, and writer of the state of Eastern Wu during the Three Kingdoms period of China. He would work on creating an armillary sphere and some of his works survive to this day, but his disobedience towards Wu's final Emperor Sun Hao would lead to his death.

== Life ==
Wang Fan was from Lujiang Commandery (廬江郡), which is located southwest of present-day Lujiang County, Anhui. Well studied with particular proficiency in calendric calculations, he started his career in Wu as a Gentleman of Writing (尚書郎) during the reign of the first Wu emperor Sun Quan or second Wu emperor Sun Liang, but resigned from office for reasons unknown.

During the reign of the third Wu emperor Sun Xiu, Wang Fan served as a Central Regular Mounted Attendant (散騎中常侍) alongside He Shao, Xue Ying and Yu Si, and was given an additional appointment as a Chief Commandant of Escorting Cavalry (駙馬都尉). He gained a reputation for his honest nature. When the Wu government sent him as an ambassador to Wu's ally, Shu Han, he was also highly regarded by the Shu government. Upon returning to Wu, he served as a military supervisor at the Wu military garrison in Xiakou (夏口). He became connected to the powerful Lu clan which would have influence in his mathematical career and reactions upon his fall.

== Downfall and death ==
During the reign of the fourth and last Wu emperor Sun Hao, Wang Fan became a Regular Attendant (常侍) alongside Wan Yu, Guo Chuo and Lou Xuan. Wang Fan fell increasingly out of favour, he was unable to hide discontent with Sun Hao's orders and on some occasions even refused to obey the orders, which led to criticism. Sun Hao's favoured Wan Yu accused the higher-born Wang Fan of belittling him and another favoured officer Chen Sheng (陳聲) also belittled Wang Fan to the Emperor. The Sanguozhi doesn't record what was said against Wang Fan but the Wulu (吳錄) by Zhang Bo, a son of a Wu minister who was living at this time, has an exchange between Wang Fan and Wan Yu. Sometimes Sun Hao liked to get drunk and have senior members teased by those in more junior ranks, Wang Fan said Wan Yu was a low-born with an appearance like a tiger but a sheep's heart who received favour beyond his empty qualities. Wan Yu said Wang Fan was unable to recognize talent or understand Wang Fan's own talents, defaming the judgement of the Emperor and those superior to him. However, the historian Pei Songzhi raises doubts about Zhang Bo's account as Wan Yu would not be raised to the claimed rank Right Imperial Chancellor (右丞相), so making him a target of Wang Fan, until after Wang Fan's death.

In 266, he offended Sun Hao and ended up losing his head. There are two accounts of what led to Wang Fan's execution and they differ on how he was executed. The Sanguozhi says when Sun Hao held a banquet for the returning envoy to Jin Ding Zhong (丁忠), Wang Fan got very drunk and fell over. He was carried out, but Sun Hao suspected Wang Fan was being disrespectful rather than drunk. Shortly after Wang Fan was summoned back and moved as normal, retaining his dignity, which Sun Hao took as confirming his suspicions. A furious Sun Hao ordered Wang Fan to be beheaded and his body would not be buried. despite the protests of Generals Teng Mu (滕牧) and Liu Ping (留平). The third century local history Jiangbiao Zhuan (江表傳; "Account of the Lands Beyond the Yangzi") by Yu Pu provides a very different tale. In it Sun Hao was concerned by shaman's warning so wished to move the capital from Jianye to Wuchang but was not certain the court would be willing to follow. At a meeting to curry favour, he asked Wang Fan something, but Wang Fan's refusal to answer angered the Emperor. Wang Fan was taken outside and beheaded then in a rather vindictive display of force, Sun Hao had Wang Fan's body taken up Mount Lai then the head thrown down the mountain for wild animals to feast upon.

Sun Hao also exiled his family to the remote Guang Province in the south. Lu Kai, the Imperial Chancellor of Wu during Sun Hao's reign, lamented Wang Fan's unfortunate end. Remarking of Wang Fan's skill and honest, how Sun Xiu had greatly valued Wang Fan while Sun Hao had despised the frank answers, claiming that all mourned his death. Lu Kai's relative, the commander Lu Kang would list Wang Fan as one of the worthy men unjustly killed in a memorial to Sun Hao.

Wang Fan had two brothers, Wang Zhu (王著) and Wang Yan (王延), who were also well-known learned men in Wu. Both of them were killed during a rebellion started by Guo Ma in 279, which was one of the events leading to the fall of Wu in 280.

== Contributions to mathematics and astronomy ==
Wang Fan was proficient in mathematics and astronomy, playing a role in Wu's advancing mathematical science from the time of the Later Han. He calculated the distance from the Sun to the Earth, but his geometric model was not correct. In addition, he gave the numerical value of π as 142 / 45 = 3.155...,⁣ which, while an improvement on the Later Han and on Lu Ji's calculations, was not as accurate as that given by the mathematician Liu Hui, who lived around the same time as him. His calculations of the sun's orbit were worse than other existing calendar models of the time but he was close with geographical latitude.

He worked with Lu Ji in constructing an armillary sphere, representing the earth by placing the sphere within a box. His work the Huntian Xiang Shuo (渾天象說; "Discourse on Uranographic Models") has survived in three parts while his work on the calendar has been translated.

== See also ==
- Lists of people of the Three Kingdoms
