= Siege of Yong'an =

Battle between the states of Cao Wei and Eastern Wu (264)

Date	c.February or March – July or August 264
Location	Fengjie County, Chongqing
Result	Cao Wei victory

Belligerents
Cao Wei; Shu Han remnants	Eastern Wu

Commanders and leaders
Luo Xian; Hu Lie	Bu Xie; Lu Kang

Strength
2,000 (Luo Xian); 20,000 (Hu Lie)	30,000+

Siege of Yong'an
- Traditional Chinese: 永安之戰
- Simplified Chinese: 永安之战
Transcriptions
Standard Mandarin
- Hanyu Pinyin: Yǒng'ān Zhī Zhàn

The siege of Yong'an was fought between the states of Eastern Wu and Cao Wei from around March to August 264, during the Three Kingdoms period of China. After the fall of Shu Han to Wei in 263, Wu attempted to seize Shu's territory but was resisted by the former Shu general, Luo Xian, who later submitted to Wei. The battle concluded with a Wei victory.

== Background ==
Badong Commandery (巴東郡; covering parts of present-day Chongqing) was a territory held by Shu Han that was located near the border of its ally, Eastern Wu. In September or October 263, the state of Cao Wei launched an invasion of Shu. The Shu general, Yan Yu (閻宇), who was in charge of guarding Badong, received orders to lead troops to support the Shu forces at the frontline. Yan Yu's deputy, Luo Xian, remained behind with only 2,000 troops to guard Yong'an (永安; present-day Fengjie County, Chongqing), the capital of Badong. In November or December 263, when news that the Shu capital, Chengdu, had fallen reached Yong'an, Luo Xian managed to calm down the people and restore order and stability in Yong'an.

Prior to its fall, Shu had also notified Wu about the invasion. In response, the Wu emperor, Sun Xiu, launched a three-pronged operation to divert Wei's attention from Shu. However, after news of Shu's fall reached Wu, Sun Xiu pulled back his forces. Wu then prepared to take advantage of the situation by invading Shu and seizing control of their former territories under the pretext of sending reinforcements to resist Wei. However, with Shu conquered, Luo Xian did not think that Wu would last for long. Furthermore, he perceived Wu's actions as a betrayal of their alliance, and thus he strengthened the defences in Yong'an to resist the Wu takeover.

== The battle ==
Around March 264, the Wu general, Bu Xie, led troops from Xiling (西陵; present-day Yichang, Hubei) to attack Yong'an but encountered strong resistance from Luo Xian and his men. As the Wu forces rained arrows on his position, Luo Xian ordered his subordinate, Yang Zong (楊宗), to break out of the siege and seek help from the Wei general, Chen Qian. He also surrendered his tallies and sent his son as a hostage to convince the Wei regent Sima Zhao of his sincerity. During this time, he led his men to strike back at Bu Xie's forces and defeated them.

Enraged at Bu Xie's defeat, the Wu emperor Sun Xiu ordered his general, Lu Kang, to lead 30,000 troops to support Bu Xie and besiege Yong'an. After a six-month-long siege, more than half of Yong'an's population fell sick from infectious diseases. When someone suggested that he break out of the siege and head south towards Zangke Commandery (牂柯郡; covering parts of present-day Guizhou) or head north to Shangyong Commandery (上庸郡; covering parts of present-day northwestern Hubei), Luo Xian refused, stating he was prepared to die defending the city.

After Chen Qian relayed Luo Xian's call for help to Sima Zhao, the Wei regent ordered the general, Hu Lie, to lead 20,000 troops from Jing Province to divert Wu forces from Yong'an by attacking Xiling. In July or August 264, Wu forces retreated after failing to capture Yong'an and due to the Wei attack at Xiling.

== Aftermath ==
Sima Zhao accepted Luo Xian's surrender and ordered him to remain behind and continue guarding Yong'an. Due to his efforts in Yong'an, Wei consolidated their control over Shu's former territories while Wu was unable to make any territorial gain in the wake of Shu's demise.
