= Zhang Ti =

Chinese Eastern Wu chancellor (died 280)

- 張悌

Imperial Chancellor (丞相)
- In office September or October 279 – 280
- Monarch: Sun Hao
- Preceded by: Lu Kai and Wan Yu

Military Adviser (軍師)
- In office c. 270s – September or October 279
- Monarch: Sun Hao

Colonel of the Garrison Cavalry (屯騎校尉)
- In office ?–?
- Monarch: Sun Xiu

Personal details
- Born: Unknown Xiangyang, Hubei
- Died: 280 He County or Dangtu County, Anhui
- Occupation: Official
- Courtesy name: Juxian (巨先)
- Peerage: Marquis of Shandu (山都侯)

Zhang Ti (died 4 April 280), courtesy name Juxian, was the tenth and last Imperial Chancellor of the state of Eastern Wu during the late Three Kingdoms period (220–280) of China. In 280, when the Jin dynasty invaded Wu as part of its strategy to reunify China under Jin rule, Zhang Ti led the Wu forces into battle to resist the Jin invasion. He was killed in action during a battle around present-day He and Dangtu counties in Anhui. Less than a month after Zhang's death, the Wu emperor Sun Hao surrendered to the Jin dynasty, thus bringing an end to the existence of Wu and the Three Kingdoms period.

== Life ==
Zhang Ti's first appearance in historical records was during the Conquest of Shu by Wei. At the time, many people in Wu thought that the expedition would end in failure, as the Sima regents of Cao Wei (Sima Yi, Sima Shi and Sima Zhao) did not have the support of the masses. However, Zhang Ti had the opposite view: he thought that it was the Cao clan (Cao Cao, Cao Pi and Cao Rui) who did not have the support of the masses. The masses feared the might of Cao Cao, while Cao Pi and Cao Rui were cruel and engaged in massive construction projects. Zhang pointed out that the Three Rebellions in Shouchun did not stir further rebellions in the Wei heartlands; when Cao Mao was assassinated, there were also no major disturbances in Wei. On the other hand, it was Shu Han that was on its last legs. In the worst-case scenario, Wei could always try again if they failed this time round. While the people of Wu laughed at his words, Shu did eventually surrender to Wei.

== See also ==
- Lists of people of the Three Kingdoms
