= Lou Xuan =

3rd century Eastern Wu official

- 樓玄

Captain of the Imperial Guards (鎮禁中候)
- In office 270 – ?
- Monarch: Sun Hao

Minister of Finance (大司農)
- In office ?–?
- Monarch: Sun Hao

Administrator of Kuaiji (會稽太守)
- In office ?–?
- Monarch: Sun Hao

Central Regular Mounted Attendant (散騎中常侍)
- In office 264 or after – ?
- Monarch: Sun Hao

Imperial Clerk Supervising Agriculture (監農御史)
- In office 258 or after – ?
- Monarch: Sun Xiu

Personal details
- Born: Unknown; Suzhou, Anhui
- Died: Unknown; Guang Province
- Children: Lou Ju
- Occupation: Politician
- Courtesy name: Chengxian (承先)

Lou Xuan (fl. 264–270s), courtesy name Chengxian, was a Chinese politician of the state of Eastern Wu during the Three Kingdoms period of China.

== Life ==
Lou Xuan was from Qi County (蘄縣), Pei Commandery (沛郡), which is around present-day Suzhou, Anhui. He served as an Imperial Clerk Supervising Agriculture (監農御史) during the reign of the third Wu emperor Sun Xiu.

After Sun Hao came to the throne in 264, he appointed Lou Xuan as a Central Regular Mounted Attendant (散騎中常侍) alongside Wang Fan, Guo Chuo (郭逴) and Wan Yu. Lou Xuan later rose through the ranks and served as the Administrator (太守) of Kuaiji Commandery and then as Minister of Finance (大司農). He was also appointed as a Captain of the Imperial Guards (鎮禁中候) in 270 and was in charge of the security of the imperial palace.

Lou Xuan was known for being just and fair, outspoken and critical of Sun Hao's outrageous behaviour. After someone accused Lou Xuan and He Shao of criticising Sun Hao's policies, the emperor so enraged that he removed Lou Xuan from office and exiled him to the remote Guang Province (廣州; covering present-day Guangdong and Guangxi). After the official Hua He spoke up in defence of Lou Xuan, Sun Hao changed his mind and exiled Lou Xuan and his son Lou Ju (樓據) to the even more remote Jiaozhi Commandery.

Sun Hao had secretly ordered Zhang Yi (張弈), a military officer stationed in Jiaozhi Commandery, to kill Lou Xuan. However, Zhang Yi could not bear to kill Lou Xuan after seeing the latter's courageous behaviour in a battle against bandit forces. After Zhang Yi died, Lou Xuan collected his belongings and saw the secret order he received from Sun Hao and realised that Zhang Yi had defied the emperor's order and let him live. Lou Xuan then committed suicide.

== See also ==
- Lists of people of the Three Kingdoms
