= Wan Yu =

Chinese Eastern Wu state official (died 272)

- 萬彧

Right Imperial Chancellor (右丞相) (alongside Lu Kai)
- In office c. October 266 – 272
- Monarch: Sun Hao
- Preceded by: Puyang Xing
- Succeeded by: Zhang Ti

Central Regular Mounted Attendant (散騎中常侍)
- In office 264 – 266
- Monarch: Sun Hao

Left Ceremonial Officer (左典軍)
- In office ?–?
- Monarch: Sun Xiu

Prefect of Wucheng (烏程令)
- In office 258 or after – ?
- Monarch: Sun Xiu

Personal details
- Born: Unknown
- Died: c. September 272 Nanjing, Jiangsu
- Occupation: Politician

Wan Yu (died c.September 272 (Note: The Records of Jiankang indicated that Wan Yu died in the 8th month of the 1st year of the Fenghuang era. This corresponds to 10 Sep to 8 Oct 272 in the Julian calendar. It also indicated that Wan Yu committed suicide after an unsuccessful poisoning attempt.)) was the ninth Imperial Chancellor (as right Imperial Chancellot alongside Lu Kai) of the state of Eastern Wu during the late Three Kingdoms period (220–280) of China.

== Life ==
Wan Yu's origins were not recorded in history. He served as the Prefect (令) of Wucheng County (烏程縣; present-day Huzhou, Zhejiang) during the reign of the third Wu emperor, Sun Xiu (r. 258–264). During this time, he befriended Sun Hao, who was then the Marquis of Wucheng. Later, he was promoted to be a Left Ceremonial Officer (左典軍).

In 264, when Sun Xiu became critically ill, he entrusted his eldest son and heir apparent Sun Wan (孫𩅦) to the care of Puyang Xing (濮陽興), his Imperial Chancellor. After Sun Xiu's death, however, Puyang Xing did not assist the underage Sun Wan in becoming the new emperor. Around the time, as Eastern Wu faced several threats (e.g. external invasion, internal uprisings), the officials hoped for an older and more mature emperor to lead them. Wan Yu then used the opportunity to recommend Sun Hao to Puyang Xing and the general Zhang Bu – the regents in the interim period – to be the new emperor, in the hope that he would be rewarded later. He told Puyang Xing and Zhang Bu that Sun Hao was wise, decisive and similar to Sun Ce (a founding father of Eastern Wu), and managed to persuade them to help Sun Hao. Puyang Xing and Zhang Bu, in turn, succeeded in convincing Sun Xiu's widow, Empress Zhu, to let Sun Hao inherit the throne.

After ascending the throne, Sun Hao appointed Wan Yu as a Central Regular Mounted Attendant (散騎中常侍), along with Wang Fan, Lou Xuan and Guo Chuo (郭逴). Later into his reign, Sun Hao turned out to be a cruel, extravagant and inept emperor, so Puyang Xing and Zhang Bu started regretting their decision to put him on the throne. When Wan Yu heard about their complaints, he secretly reported them to Sun Hao, who had them executed along with their families. Among his colleagues, Wan Yu got along well the most with Lou Xuan and the least with Wang Fan. He particularly detested Wang Fan as he believed that Wang Fan leveraged on his close relationship with Sun Hao to gain the emperor's favour. Wan Yu and another official, Chen Sheng (陳聲), often slandered Wang Fan in front of Sun Hao. Over time, Sun Hao also gradually hated Wang Fan more and more because the latter often spoke up against his outrageous behaviour. Sun Hao finally found an excuse to execute Wang Fan in 266.

In 266, Sun Hao split the office of Imperial Chancellor into two, and appointed Wan Yu as Right Imperial Chancellor (右丞相) and Lu Kai as Left Imperial Chancellor (左丞相). The reason for splitting the office was that he wanted Wan Yu to balance against the influential and more senior Lu Kai. In the spring of 267, Sun Hao ordered Wan Yu to supervise military affairs in Jing Province and station at Baqiu (巴丘; present-day Yueyang, Hunan), effectively replacing Lu Kai, who had been performing that task for years.

In 268, Sun Hao decided to wage war against Eastern Wu's rival state, the Jin dynasty, so he ordered Wan Yu and Shi Ji to lead the Wu forces in Jing Province to attack the Jin dynasty. Wan Yu led troops to attack Xiangyang Commandery (襄陽郡; present-day Xiangyang, Hubei), but was defeated and driven back by the Jin general Hu Lie (胡烈). After Lu Kai died in 269, Sun Hao summoned Wan Yu back to Jianye (建康; present-day Nanjing, Jiangsu), the Wu imperial capital, in the following year. During this time, Wan Yu recommended Lou Xuan to serve as a Captain of the Imperial Guards.

In the winter of 270/271, (Note: The 10th to 12th months of the Chinese year 270 corresponds to 1 Nov 270 to 27 Jan 271 in the Julian calendar.) despite strong objections from his subjects, Sun Hao launched a military campaign against the Jin dynasty and set off from Niuzhu (牛渚; present-day Dangtu County, Anhui). Along the way, the Wu army encountered a snowstorm and could not advance. During this time, the Wu soldiers started grumbling and complaining; there was even talk among them about defecting to the Jin dynasty. Before Sun Hao ordered the troops to retreat back to Eastern Wu, Wan Yu had already secretly made arrangements with the generals Ding Feng and Liu Ping (留平) to return to Wu without informing the emperor. When Sun Hao found out, he was extremely furious but he did not immediately take action against them because the three of them held important positions in his government. After Ding Feng died of illness later that year, Sun Hao exiled his family to Linchuan (臨川郡; around present-day Linchuan District, Fuzhou, Jiangxi). In the following year, Sun Hao secretly instructed a servant to serve poisoned wine to Wan Yu, but the servant added too little poison so Wan Yu survived. Nevertheless, upon realising that the emperor wanted him dead, Wan Yu killed himself. One month later, Liu Ping also died in distress and frustration. (Note: In vol.03 of Zizhi Tongjian Kaoyi, Sima Guang noted that Chen Shou wrote in Sun Hao's biography in Sanguozhi that Wan Yu died in despair after he knew about his exile. Sima adopted the account found in Jiang Biao Zhuan (and by extension, Jiankang Shilu).) Sun Hao exiled Wan Yu's family to Luling Commandery (廬陵郡; northwest of present-day Taihe County, Jiangxi).

== See also ==
- Lists of people of the Three Kingdoms
