= Puyang Xing =

Chinese Eastern Wu chancellor (died 264)

- 濮陽興

Imperial Chancellor (丞相)
- In office October or November 262 – 6 December 264
- Monarch: Sun Xiu / Sun Hao
- Preceded by: Sun Chen
- Succeeded by: Lu Kai and Wan Yu

Governor of Qing Province (青州牧) (nominal)
- In office 3 September 264 – 6 December 264
- Monarch: Sun Hao

Palace Attendant (侍中)
- In office 3 September 264 – 6 December 264
- Monarch: Sun Hao

General of the Guards (衞將軍)
- In office December 258 – 3 September 264
- Monarch: Sun Xiu

Minister of Ceremonies (太常)
- In office December 258 – 3 September 264
- Monarch: Sun Xiu

Administrator of Kuaiji (會稽太守)
- In office ? – December 258
- Monarch: Sun Quan / Sun Liang

Personal details
- Born: Unknown
- Died: c. December 264
- Parent: Puyang Yi (father)
- Occupation: Politician
- Courtesy name: Ziyuan (子元)
- Peerage: Marquis of Waihuang (外黃侯)

Puyang Xing (died c. December 264), courtesy name Ziyuan, was the eighth Imperial Chancellor of the state of Eastern Wu during the Three Kingdoms period of China.

== Family background ==
Puyang Xing's ancestral home was in Chenliu Commandery (陳留郡), which is around present-day Kaifeng, Henan. His father, Puyang Yi (濮陽逸), came from a humble background but had great ambitions. Puyang Yi befriended Lu Mao, who shared his wealth with him and other friends.

When chaos broke out in central China towards the end of the Eastern Han dynasty, Puyang Yi fled south to the Jiangdong (or Wu) region for shelter. He served under Sun Quan, the founding emperor of Eastern Wu, and became the Administrator (太守) of Changsha Commandery. Puyang Xing was presumably born in the Jiangdong region after his father migrated there.

== Service under Sun Quan and Sun Liang ==
Puyang Xing was known for his scholarly talents since he was young. During Sun Quan's reign, he started his career as the Prefect of Shangyu County (上虞縣; present-day Shangyu District, Shaoxing, Zhejiang) before being promoted to serve in the imperial secretariat. Later, Sun Quan appointed him as General of the Household for All Purposes (五官中郎將) and sent him as an ambassador to Wu's ally state, Shu Han. After Puyang Xing returned from his diplomatic mission, Sun Quan reassigned him to be the Administrator of Kuaiji Commandery (around present-day Shaoxing, Zhejiang). During this time, Puyang Xing met and befriended Sun Xiu, Sun Quan's sixth son who was living in Kuaiji Commandery at the time. and he sought, at a banquet he hosted, information on Yu Fan's discussion of the local history with Wang Ling.

== Service under Sun Xiu ==
In 258, after Sun Xiu succeeded his younger brother Sun Liang as the emperor of Wu, he appointed Puyang Xing as Minister of Ceremonies (太常) and General of the Guards (衞將軍) and put him in charge of overseeing military affairs in Wu. He also enfeoffed Puyang Xing as the Marquis of Waihuang (外黃侯).

In 260, a commandant named Yan Mi (嚴密) proposed building embankments near present-day Xuancheng, Anhui to create an artificial lake for irrigation purposes. Many Wu officials strongly opposed the idea as they believed that it was too costly and there was no guarantee of success. Puyang Xing was the only person who supported the project, and he recruited all available manpower to start building the embankments. However, he incurred much resentment from the masses when many labourers lost their lives in accidents because of the dangers and difficulties of constructing the embankments.

In October or November 262, Sun Xiu appointed Puyang Xing as Imperial Chancellor (丞相). During Puyang's tenure, Sun Xiu trusted the mutual friendships between him, Puyang and the general Zhang Bu, to ensure that Puyang and Zhang cooperated, and backed each other as they monopolised power in the Wu government. Their power grabbing behaviour caused both government officials and the common people to feel very disappointed with them.

When Sun Xiu became critically ill in 264, he summoned Puyang Xing into the palace, where he ordered his eldest son and heir apparent, Sun Wan (孫𩅦), to pay respects to Puyang Xing. At the same time, he held Puyang Xing's arm and entrusted Sun Wan to him.

== Service under Sun Hao ==
Following Sun Xiu's death on 3 September 264, Puyang Xing did not install Sun Wan (孫𩅦) on the throne as he had promised. Instead, he and Zhang Bu pledged their support to Sun Wan's cousin Sun Hao after Wan Yu persuaded them to do so, persuading the bereaved former Empress Jing who was reluctant to be involved in such matters. Sun Hao thus became the new emperor of Wu. After his coronation, Sun Hao granted Puyang Xing the additional appointment of a Palace Attendant (侍中) and made him the nominal Governor of Qing Province (which was not Wu territory).

When Sun Hao turned out to be a cruel, superstitious and self-indulgent tyrant instead of the wise ruler they hoped he would be, Puyang Xing and Zhang Bu expressed regret over their earlier decision to put Sun Hao on the throne. Wan Yu heard about it and secretly reported them to Sun Hao. On 6 December 264, (Note: Volume 78 of Zizhi Tongjian recorded that Puyang Xing and Zhang Bu were arrested on the 1st day of the 11th month of the Xianxi era of Cao Huan's reign. This corresponds to 6 Dec 264 on the Julian calendar.) Puyang Xing and Zhang Bu were arrested as soon as they showed up in Sun Hao's imperial court. Sun Hao then stripped them of their appointments and exiled them to the distant Guang Province (廣州; covering present-day Guangdong and Guangxi). He changed his mind later and sent assassins to kill them while they were en route to Guang Province, and ordered the execution of their families as well.

== Appraisal ==
The third-century historian Chen Shou, who wrote Puyang Xing's biography in the Sanguozhi, commented that Puyang Xing deserved his downfall for not properly playing his role as Imperial Chancellor, for monopolising power alongside Zhang Bu, and for heeding Wan Yu's suggestion to install Sun Hao on the throne.

== See also ==
- Lists of people of the Three Kingdoms
