= Zhang Bu (Eastern Wu) =

Chinese Eastern Wu general (died 264)

- 張布

General of Agile Cavalry (驃騎將軍)
- In office September 264 – December 264
- Monarch: Sun Hao

General of the Left (左將軍)
- In office 258 – September 264
- Monarch: Sun Liang / Sun Xiu

Personal details
- Born: Unknown
- Died: c. December 264 (Note: Sun Hao's biography in the Sanguozhi recorded that Puyang Xing and Zhang Bu were executed in the 11th month of the 1st year of the Yuanxing era of Sun Hao's reign. This month corresponds to 6 December 264 to 4 January 265 in the Gregorian calendar.)
- Children: two daughters
- Occupation: General

Zhang Bu (died c. December 264) was a military general of the state of Eastern Wu during the Three Kingdoms period of China. In 258, he and another general, Ding Feng, overthrew the regent Sun Chen in a coup and restored power to the emperor Sun Xiu. In 264, after the death of Sun Xiu, he and Puyang Xing supported Sun Hao to be the new emperor. However, shortly after Sun Hao's enthronement, Zhang Bu and Puyang Xing were exiled by the emperor for criticising his brutality. Sun Hao later sent his men to murder Zhang and Puyang while they were on their way to exile in Guangzhou.

== Life ==
In October or November 262, Sun Xiu appointed Puyang Xing as Imperial Chancellor (丞相). During Puyang's tenure, Sun Xiu trusted the mutual friendships between him, Puyang and Zhang Bu, to ensure that Puyang and Zhang cooperated, and backed each other as they monopolised power in the Wu government. Their power grabbing behaviour caused both government officials and the common people to feel very disappointed with them.

=== Service under Sun Hao ===
Following Sun Xiu's death on 3 September 264, Puyang Xing did not install Sun Wan (孫𩅦) on the throne as he promised. Instead, he and Zhang Bu pledged their support to Sun Wan's cousin Sun Hao after Wan Yu persuaded them to do so. Sun Hao thus became the new emperor of Wu.

When Sun Hao turned out to be a cruel, superstitious and self-indulgent tyrant instead of the wise ruler they hoped he would be, Puyang Xing and Zhang Bu expressed regret over their earlier decision to put Sun Hao on the throne. Wan Yu heard about it and secretly reported them to Sun Hao. On 6 December 264, (Note: Volume 78 of Zizhi Tongjian recorded that Puyang Xing and Zhang Bu were arrested on the 1st day of the 11th month of the Xianxi era of Cao Huan's reign. This corresponds to 6 Dec 264 on the Julian calendar.) Puyang Xing and Zhang Bu were arrested as soon as they showed up in Sun Hao's imperial court. Sun Hao then stripped them of their appointments and exiled them to the distant Guang Province (廣州; covering present-day Guangdong and Guangxi). He changed his mind later and sent assassins to kill them while they were en route to Guang Province, and ordered the execution of their families as well.

== See also ==
- Lists of people of the Three Kingdoms
