= Eastern Wu =

One of the Three Kingdoms of China (222–280)

Wu 吳
- 222–280 AD (Note: Dardess acknowledged the error in Sun Hao's biography in Sanguozhi (that there was no renshen day in the 3rd month of the 4th year of the Tianji era); 31 May 280 corresponds to the renshen (16th) day of the 4th month of that year. In Zizhi Tongjian Kaoyi, Sima Guang wrote that if Sun Hao did surrender on the 16th day of the 4th month, then he and his family couldn't have reached the capital Luoyang on the 1st day of the 5th month (i.e. 15 days later).)
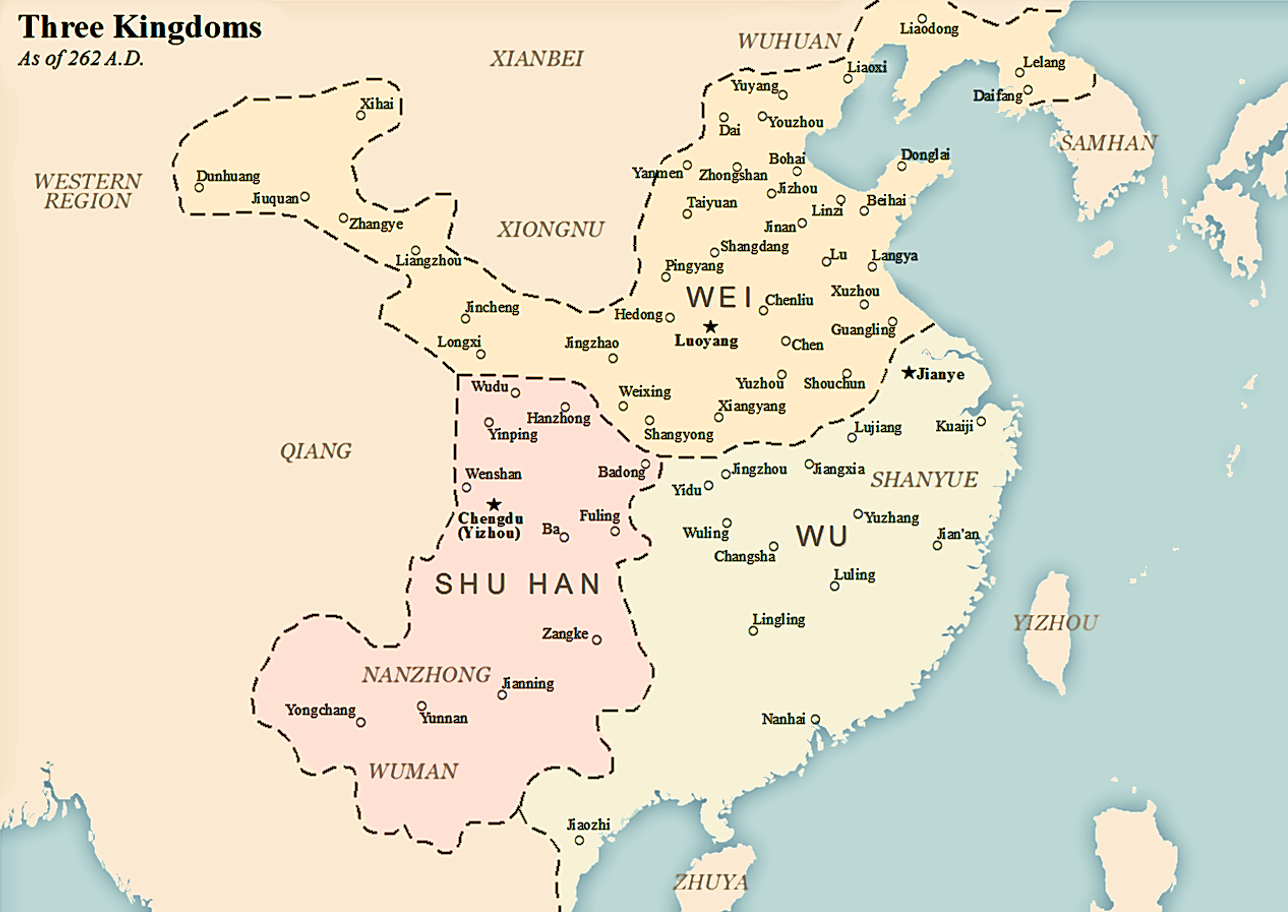
- The territories of Wu (in light greenish grey; to the southeast), as of 262 A.D.
- Capital: Wuchang (222–229, 265–266); Jianye (229–265, 266–280)
- Common languages: Eastern Han Chinese, Old Jiangdong Chinese, Proto-Wu Chinese
- Religion: Taoism; Confucianism; Chinese folk religion
- Government: Monarchy
- King (222–229) Emperor (229–280)
  - Nov 222 – May 252: Sun Quan
  - May 252 – Nov 258: Sun Liang
  - Nov 258 – Sep 264: Sun Xiu
  - Sep 264 – May 280: Sun Hao
- Historical era: Three Kingdoms
  - Independence from Cao Wei: 222
  - Sun Quan declaring himself Emperor: 229
  - Conquest of Wu by Jin: 31 May 280 AD (Note: Dardess acknowledged the error in Sun Hao's biography in Sanguozhi (that there was no renshen day in the 3rd month of the 4th year of the Tianji era); 31 May 280 corresponds to the renshen (16th) day of the 4th month of that year. In Zizhi Tongjian Kaoyi, Sima Guang wrote that if Sun Hao did surrender on the 16th day of the 4th month, then he and his family couldn't have reached the capital Luoyang on the 1st day of the 5th month (i.e. 15 days later).)

Population
  - 238: 2,567,000 (disputed)
  - 280: 2,535,000 (disputed)
- Currency: Chinese coin, Chinese cash
Preceded by	Succeeded by
Cao Wei	Western Jin
- Today part of: China; Vietnam
- Tanner (2009) estimates the Wu population to be about one-sixth of the Han population. This would be much more than the numbers given in 238 and 280, and could be because of census methods used in ancient China.

Eastern Wu
- Traditional Chinese: 東吳
- Simplified Chinese: 东吴
- Hanyu Pinyin: Dōng Wú
Transcriptions
Standard Mandarin
- Hanyu Pinyin: Dōng Wú
- Bopomofo: ㄉㄨㄥ ㄨˊ
- Gwoyeu Romatzyh: Dong Wu
- Wade–Giles: Tung^{1} Wu^{2}
- Tongyong Pinyin: Dong Wú
- Yale Romanization: Dūng Wú
- MPS2: Dūng Wú
- IPA: [tʊ́ŋ ǔ]
Yue: Cantonese
- Yale Romanization: Dūng Ng̀h
- Jyutping: Dung1 Ng4
- IPA: [tóŋ ŋ̩̏]
Southern Min
- Hokkien POJ: Tang Ngô͘ or Tong Ngô͘
- Tâi-lô: Tang Ngôo or Tong Ngôo

Sun Wu
- Traditional Chinese: 孫吳
- Simplified Chinese: 孙吴
- Hanyu Pinyin: Sūn Wú
Transcriptions
Standard Mandarin
- Hanyu Pinyin: Sūn Wú
- Bopomofo: ㄙㄨㄣ ㄨˊ
- Gwoyeu Romatzyh: Suen Wu
- Wade–Giles: Sun^{1} Wu^{2}
- Tongyong Pinyin: Sun Wú
- Yale Romanization: Swūn Wú
- MPS2: Suēn Wú
- IPA: [swə́n ǔ]
Yue: Cantonese
- Yale Romanization: Syūn Ng̀h
- Jyutping: Syun1 Ng4
- IPA: [sýːn ŋ̩̏]

Wu (Chinese: 吳; pinyin: Wú; Middle Chinese *ŋuo < Eastern Han Chinese: *ŋuɑ), known in historiography as Eastern Wu or Sun Wu, was a dynastic state of China and one of the three major states that competed for supremacy over China during the Three Kingdoms period. It previously existed from 220 to 222 AD as a vassal kingdom nominally under its rival state Cao Wei but declared complete independence in November 222 AD. It was elevated to an empire in May 229 AD after its founding ruler Sun Quan (Emperor Da) declared himself emperor.

The name Wu was derived from the place it was based in—the Jiangnan (Yangtze River Delta) region, which was also historically known as Wu. It was called "Eastern Wu" (東吳; Dōng Wú) or "Sun Wu" (孫吳) by historians to distinguish it from other Chinese historical states with similar names in that region, such as the Wu state of the Spring and Autumn period and the Wuyue kingdom of the Five Dynasties and Ten Kingdoms period. It was called Eastern Wu because it occupied most of eastern China in the Three Kingdoms period, and Sun Wu because the family name of its rulers was Sun.

During its existence, Wu's capital was sometimes at Jianye (present-day Nanjing, Jiangsu) and sometimes at Wuchang (武昌; present-day Ezhou, Hubei).

== History ==
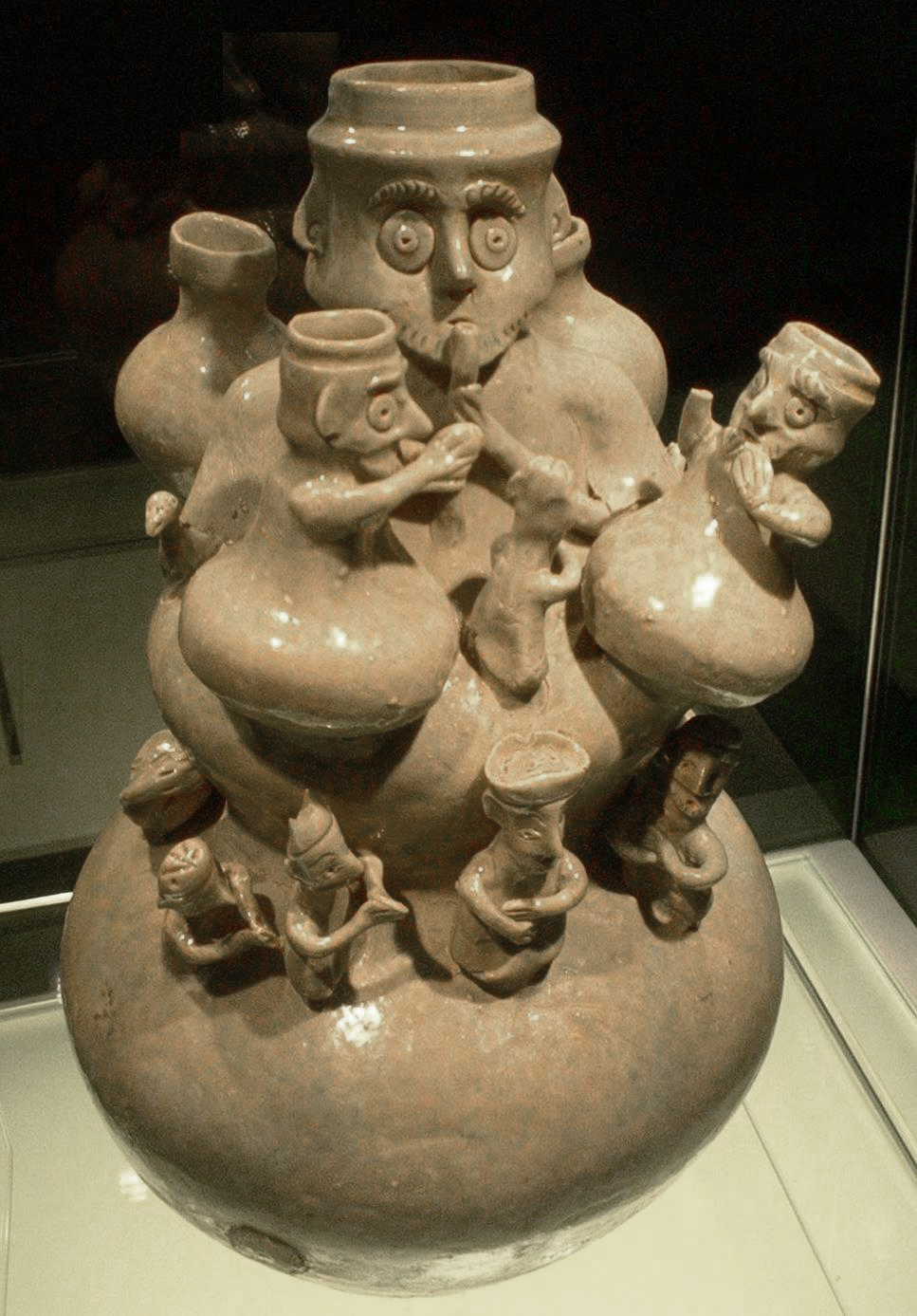
A jar made in Eastern Wu dating to the Three Kingdoms period

=== Beginnings and founding ===
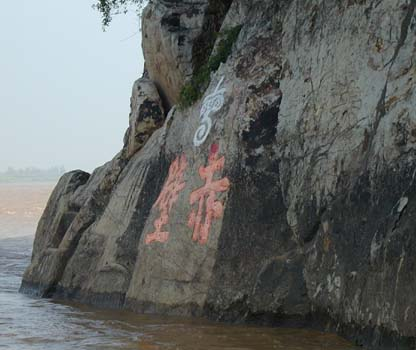
Before the dynasty of Eastern Wu was established, the territory was defended by the Sun clan in the Battle of Red Cliffs.

Towards the end of the Han dynasty, Sun Ce, the eldest son of the warlord Sun Jian, and his followers borrowed troops from the warlord Yuan Shu and embarked on a series of military conquests in the Jiangdong and Wu regions between 194 and 199, seizing several territories previously occupied by warlords such as Liu Yao, Yan Baihu and Wang Lang. Sun Ce broke off relations with Yuan Shu around 196–197 after the latter declared himself emperor—an act deemed as treason against Emperor Xian, the figurehead ruler of the Han dynasty. The warlord Cao Cao, who was the de facto head of government in the Han imperial court, asked Emperor Xian to grant Sun Ce the title of "Marquis of Wu" (吳侯).

Sun Ce was assassinated in the summer of 200 and was succeeded by his younger brother, Sun Quan. Sun Quan, like his elder brother, also paid nominal allegiance to Emperor Xian while maintaining autonomous rule over the Wu territories. In 208, Sun Quan allied with the warlord Liu Bei and they combined forces to defeat Cao Cao at the Battle of Red Cliffs. Sun Quan and Liu Bei maintained their alliance against Cao Cao after the battle for the next ten years or so, despite having some territorial disputes over Jing Province. In 219, Sun Quan severed ties with Liu Bei when he sent his general Lü Meng to invade Liu's territories in Jing Province. Guan Yu, who was defending Liu Bei's assets in Jing Province, was captured and executed by Sun Quan's forces. After that, the boundaries of Sun Quan's domain extended from beyond the Jiangdong region to include the southern part of Jing Province, which covered roughly present-day Hunan and parts of Hubei.

In 220, Cao Cao's son and successor, Cao Pi, ended the Han dynasty by forcing Emperor Xian to abdicate in his favour and established the state of Cao Wei. Sun Quan agreed to submit to Wei and was granted the title of a vassal king, "King of Wu" (吳王), by Cao Pi. A year later, Liu Bei declared himself emperor and founded the state of Shu Han. In 222, Liu Bei launched a military campaign against Sun Quan to take back Jing Province and avenge Guan Yu, leading to the Battle of Xiaoting. However, Liu Bei suffered a crushing defeat at the hands of Sun Quan's general Lu Xun and was forced to retreat to Baidicheng, where he died a year later.

Liu Bei's successor, Liu Shan, and his regent, Zhuge Liang, made peace with Sun Quan later and reaffirmed their previous alliance. Sun Quan declared independence from Wei in 222, but continued to rule as "King of Wu" until 229, when he declared himself "Emperor of Wu". His legitimacy was recognised by Shu.

To distinguish the state from other historical Chinese states of the same name, historians have added a relevant character to the state's original name: the state that called itself "Wu" (吳) is also known as "Eastern Wu" (東吳; Dōng Wú) or "Sun Wu" (孫吳).

=== Sun Quan's reign ===
Sun Quan ruled for over 30 years and his long reign resulted in stability in southern China. During his reign, Wu engaged Wei in numerous wars, including the battles of Ruxu (222–223), Shiting (228), and Hefei (234). However, Wu never managed to gain any territory north of the Yangtze River while Wei also never succeeded in conquering the lands south of the Yangtze.

A succession struggle broke out between Sun Quan's sons in the later part of his reign—Sun Quan installed Sun He as the crown prince in 242 after his former heir apparent, Sun Deng, died in 241, but Sun He soon became involved in a rivalry with his younger brother, Sun Ba. The conflict resulted in the emergence of two rivalling factions, each supporting either Sun He or Sun Ba, in Sun Quan's imperial court. Sun Quan eventually deposed Sun He and forced Sun Ba to commit suicide, while Lu Xun and many other ministers who took either Sun He's or Sun Ba's side in the struggle met with unhappy ends. Sun Quan appointed his youngest son, Sun Liang, as the crown prince after the incident.

=== Reigns of Sun Liang and Sun Xiu ===
Sun Quan died in 252 and was succeeded by Sun Liang, with Zhuge Ke and Sun Jun serving as regents. In 253, Zhuge Ke was assassinated in a coup launched by Sun Jun, and the state power of Wu fell into Sun Jun's hands and was passed on to his cousin, Sun Chen, after his death. During Sun Liang's reign, two rebellions broke out in the Wei garrison at Shouchun (around present-day Shou County, Anhui) in 255 and 257–258. Sun Jun and Sun Chen led Wu forces to support the rebels in the first and second rebellions respectively in the hope of making some territorial gains in Wei, but both revolts were suppressed and the Wu forces retreated after suffering many losses.

Sun Liang was deposed in 258 by Sun Chen, who installed Sun Xiu, another son of Sun Quan, on the throne. Sun Xiu killed Sun Chen later in a coup with the help of Zhang Bu and Ding Feng.

=== Fall of Wu ===
Sun Xiu died of illness in 264, a year after Shu was conquered by Wei. At the time, Wu was experiencing internal turmoil because rebellions had broken out in Jiaozhi (交趾) in the south. The ministers Puyang Xing, Wan Yu and Zhang Bu decided to install Sun He's son, Sun Hao, on the throne.

In the beginning of Sun Hao's reign, the emperor reduced taxes, gave relief to the poor, and granted freedom to a large number of palace maids. However, Sun Hao gradually became more cruel and superstitious and started indulging in wine and women instead of finding ways to revive his declining state. Sun Hao's tyranny caused widespread anger and hatred towards him in Wu, but it was due to the efforts of officials such as Lu Kai and Lu Kang that Wu was able to remain relatively stable and peaceful.

In February 266, Sima Yan ended the state of Cao Wei by forcing its last ruler, Cao Huan, to abdicate in his favour, and then established the Jin dynasty. In the summer of 279, Guo Ma rose in rebellion in Guangzhou. In late 279, Jin forces led by Du Yu, Wang Jun and others attacked Wu from six directions. Sun Hao attempted to put up resistance by sending his armies to fight the Jin invaders, but the Wu forces suffered several consecutive defeats and even the Wu chancellor, Zhang Ti, was killed in action. Seeing that Wu was doomed to fall, Sun Hao surrendered to the Jin dynasty on 31 May 280, (Note: Sun Hao's biography in the Sanguozhi recorded that Sun Hao surrendered on the renshen day of the 3rd month of the 4th year of the Tianji era of his reign. This is an error as there was no renshen day in that month. The Zizhi Tongjian recorded that it was the renyin day of the 3rd month of the 1st year of the Taikang era of Sima Yan's reign. This date corresponds to 1 May 280 in the Julian calendar. Emperor Wu's biography in Book of Jin gave the same date as the one recorded in Sun Hao's biography in Sanguozhi. However, Wang Jun's biography recorded a memorial to the throne in which he wrote that he reached Moling on the 15th day of that month. The 15th day of the 3rd month of that year was a renyin day.) marking the end of Wu and the end of the Three Kingdoms period.

== Government and military ==
Despite Sun Quan proclaiming himself emperor in 229, its politics reflected its warlord origins. When Wu was initially founded its military was dominated by famed generals who had gained their positions through prowess and pluck. These generals were celebrated for their individualism.

Politics within the court were often influenced by conflicts between powerful families and individuals. Positions within the court were inherited from one generation to the next unlike the Han dynasty's bureaucracy. However, over time, the influence ultimately would move away from the central government. Outside of the court, families displayed their own independent authority. Wu, at times, was to a certain extent run for the protection of particular families.

The Eastern Wu era was a formative period in Vietnamese history. The ruler of Jiaozhou (modern Vietnam and Guangzhou), Shi Xie, is primarily remembered today in Vietnam as Sĩ Nhiếp. According to Stephen O'Harrow, Shi Xie was essentially "the first Vietnamese." Originally satisfied with Eastern Wu's rule, the Vietnamese opposed Shi Hui's rebellion against Eastern Wu and attacked him for it. However, when the Wu general Lü Dai betrayed Shi Hui and executed the entire Shi family, the Vietnamese became greatly upset. In 248, the people of Jiaozhi and Jiuzhen commanderies rebelled. Eastern Wu sent Lu Yin to deal with the rebels. He managed to pacify the rebels with a combination of threats and persuasion. However the rebels regrouped under the leadership of Lady Triệu in Jiuzhen and renewed the rebellion with a march on Jiaozhi. According to the Đại Việt sử ký toàn thư (Complete Annals of Đại Việt), Lady Triệu had long breasts that reached her shoulders and rode into battle on an elephant. After several months of warfare she was defeated and committed suicide.

== Language, culture and economy ==
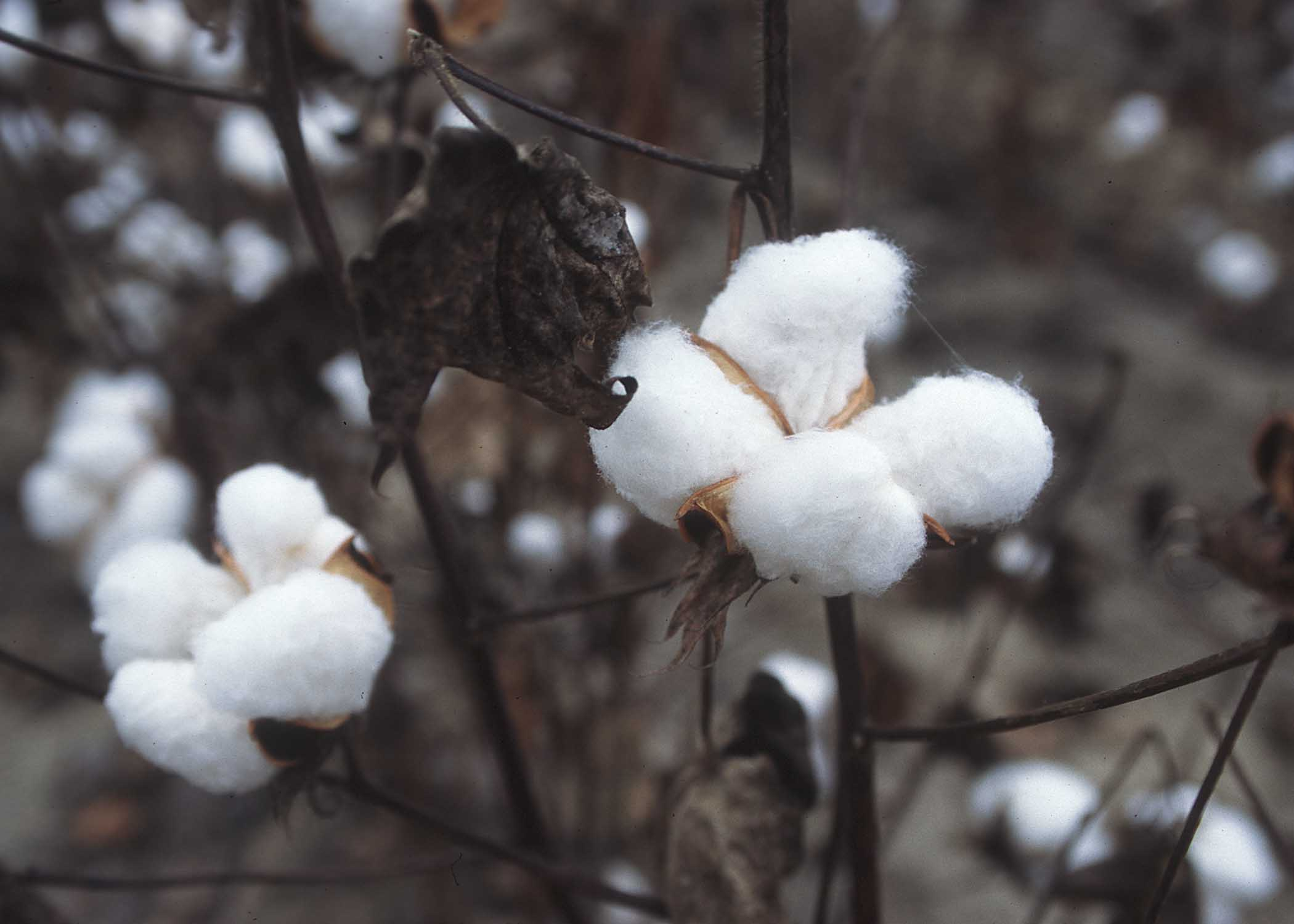
Shu Han exported cotton into Eastern Wu.

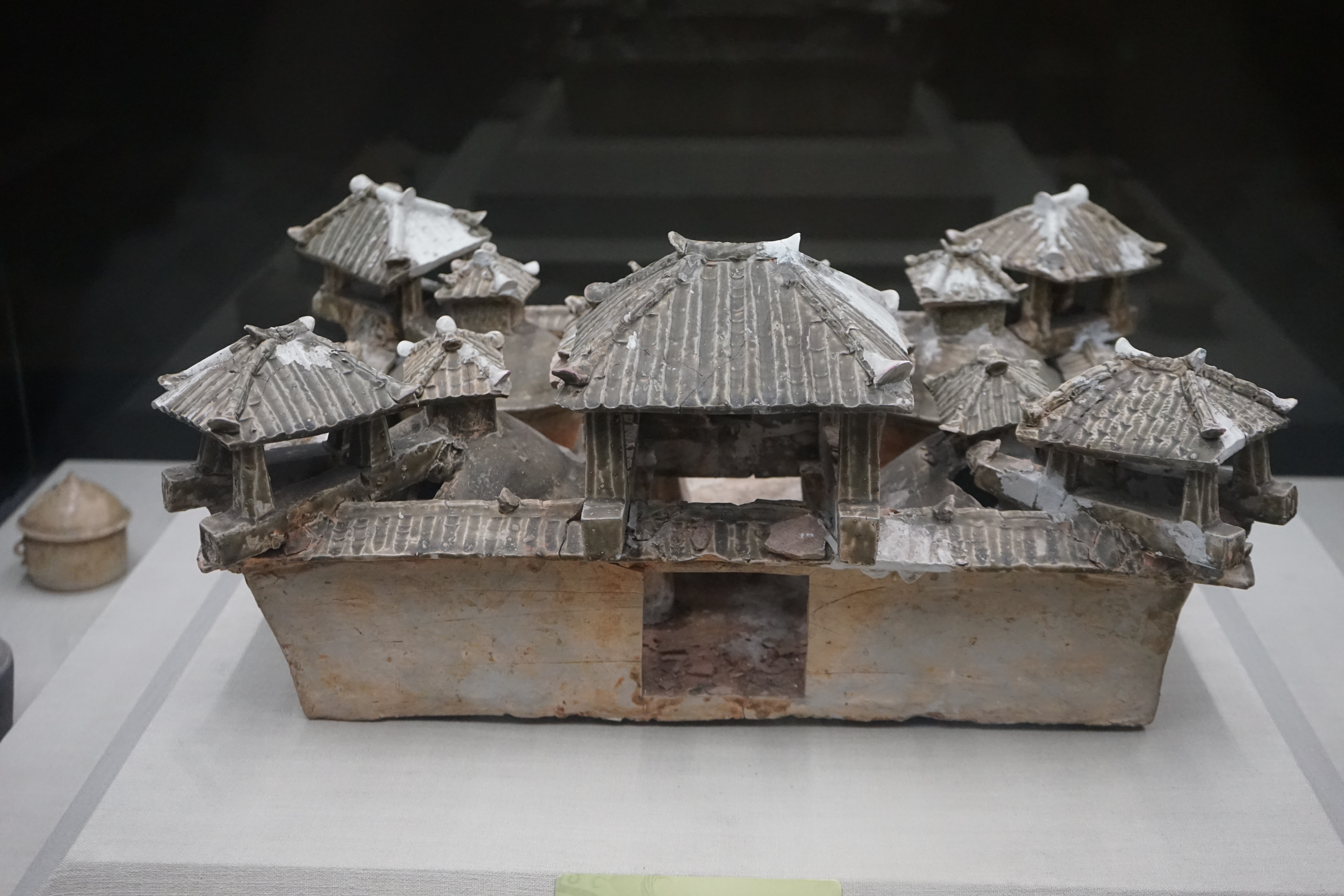
Celadon Storehouse and Courtyard. Wu Kingdom.

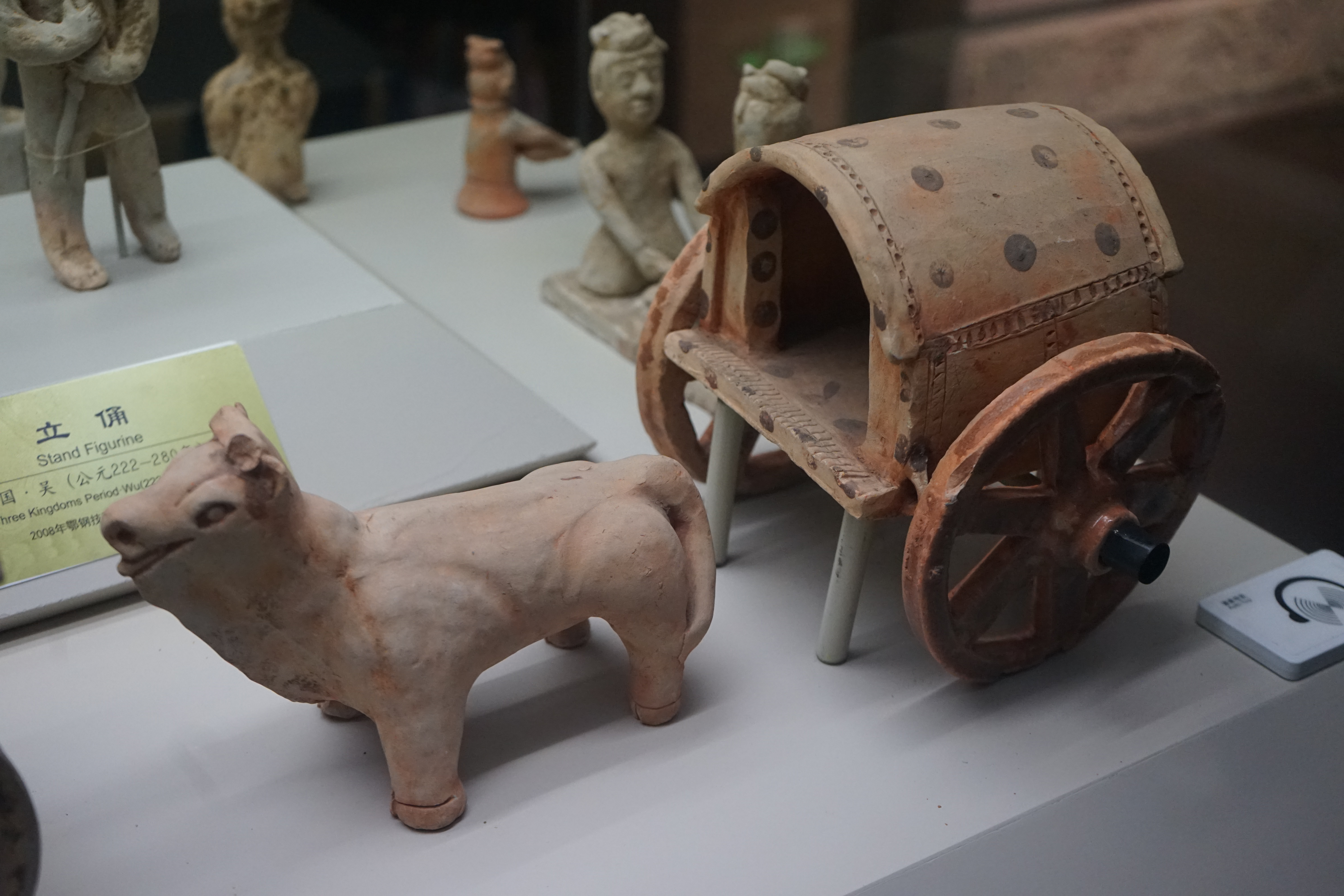
Pottery Bullock-cart. Wu Kingdom.

The culture of Wu was most solidified under the reign of Sun Quan from 229 to 252. Migrations from the north and the needed settlement from the Shanyue barbarians made it possible for the increase in manpower, agriculture, and settling the lower most parts of Wu. Along with that, river transportation became a huge factor and flourished as the Jiangnan and Zhedong canals were finished with construction. After the Battle of Xiaoting and during the invasions of Wu by Wei in the 220s, Shu was able to reestablish their trade and relationships with Wu. Shu's cotton was a great influx for Wu, and the development of shipbuilding, salt, and metal industries was greatly increased.

The fact of inflation and economic problems still were in existence since the Han dynasty. Sun Quan tried to start a currency of large coins manufactured by copper. He also tried to prohibit private minting. This policy was terminated in 246 due to ineffectiveness. (Note: The coinage policies of this period are described in CS 26, 794–795; Yang, "Economic history," 191–192. See also the article of Ho Tzu-ch'üan, "Manorial economy," summarised in Sun and DeFrancis, Chinese social history, at 140. On the large coins of Wu, and the attempt to enforce a monopoly of minting, see SGZ 47/Wu 2, 1140, 1142 and 1146 PC quoting Jiangbiao zhuan.)

Eastern Wu was able to make close overseas trade with countries such as Vietnam and Cambodia. Wu also traded with India and the Middle East.

The language of Eastern Wu was identified with Old Jiangdong (古江東方言), the speech of the Jiangdong area (Jiangxi, Zhejiang, Fujian, Southern Anhui, Jiangsu); this dialect, which was already different from northern speech, is described in Shishuo Xinyu by Liu Yiqing (刘义庆, 403-444), which narrates that Wang Dao learned the idiom after fleeing in Jiankang, today's Nanjing.

In the end, proto-Wu emerged as the unified proto-language from which every contemporary Wu language is spoken. Wu dialects have striking similarities to Early Middle Chinese as described in the Qieyun phonological system. A reconstruction of proto-Wu was attempted by William Harvey Ballard in 1969.

== Civil matters ==
Personages with clerical or scholarly abilities had roles to play within the state, but the policies were more determined by those of military command. Nevertheless, every Wu army was in need of administrative support and, according to Rafe de Crespigny, certain scholars were "recognised as practical counsellors, regardless of their fighting prowess or their ability to command troops in the field."

Under the reign of Sun Quan, he needed a strong role of advisors and secretaries in order to keep his link of power in a maintained level. Sun Quan's prestige in dealing with hostiles and friendly relations called for the establishment of a controlled form of an imperial government for the empire of Wu. Sun Quan also created the opportunity for people residing within Wu to gain prestige and influence throughout the empire and the surrounding establishments with the duty of being an envoy.

Following the death of Cao Pi in 226, Sun Quan strongly promoted his kingdom to focus on agriculture because the threat from Wei was lifted. However, Lu Xun suggested to Sun Quan that military commanders should become involved in the colonization of land. Sun Quan quickly accepted and he, along with his sons would execute the memorial presented by Lu Xun. However, in 240, Sun Quan restrained Lu Xun's idea and refocused on agricultural works, because Wu came to suffer a severe famine. In 234, when Zhuge Ke was in control of affairs in the south, he strongly ignored the colonisation order and viciously ordered the agriculture factor, often starving enemies into submission.

== Legacy ==
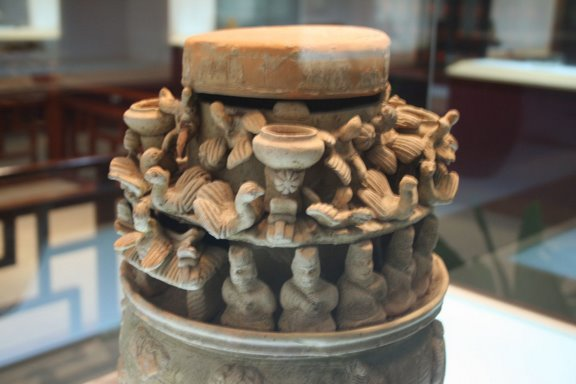
An Eastern Wu green-glaze ceramic jar with human figures, birds, and architecture on display in the Nanjing Museum

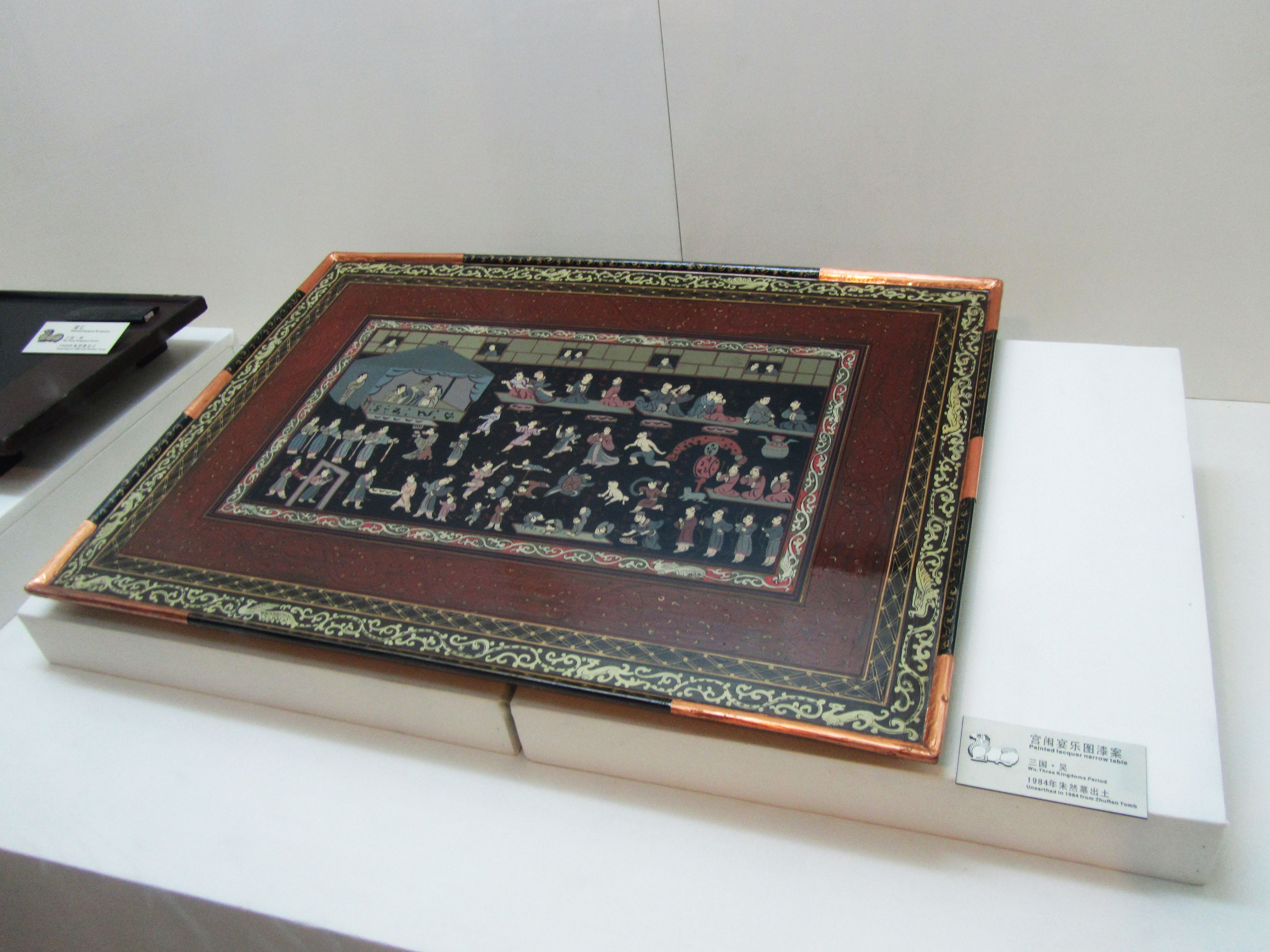
Painted lacquerware table from the tomb of Zhu Ran (182–249) in Anhui province, Eastern Wu period, showing figures wearing silk Hanfu attire

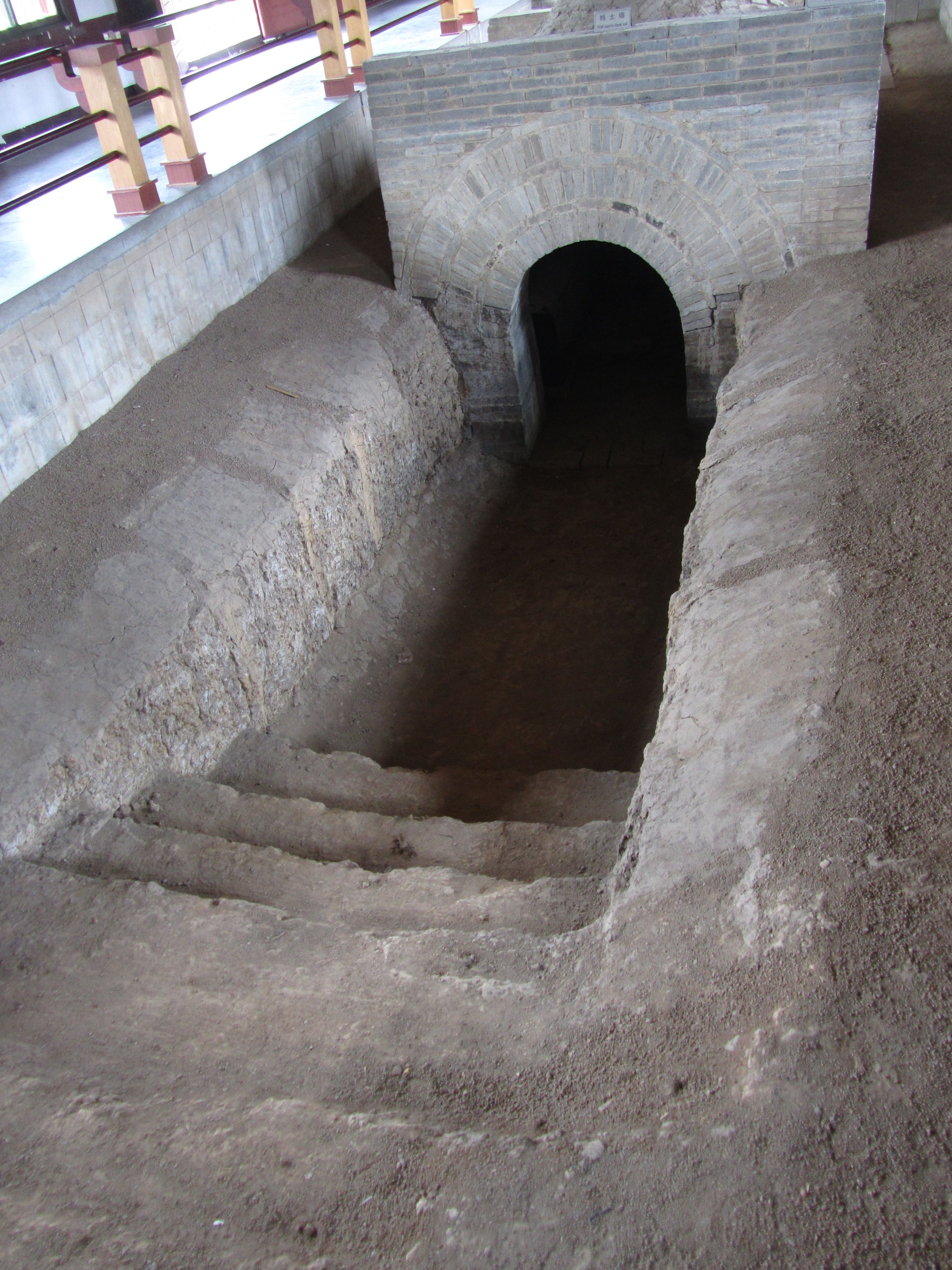
Entrance to the tomb of Zhu Ran (182–249) in Anhui province, Eastern Wu period

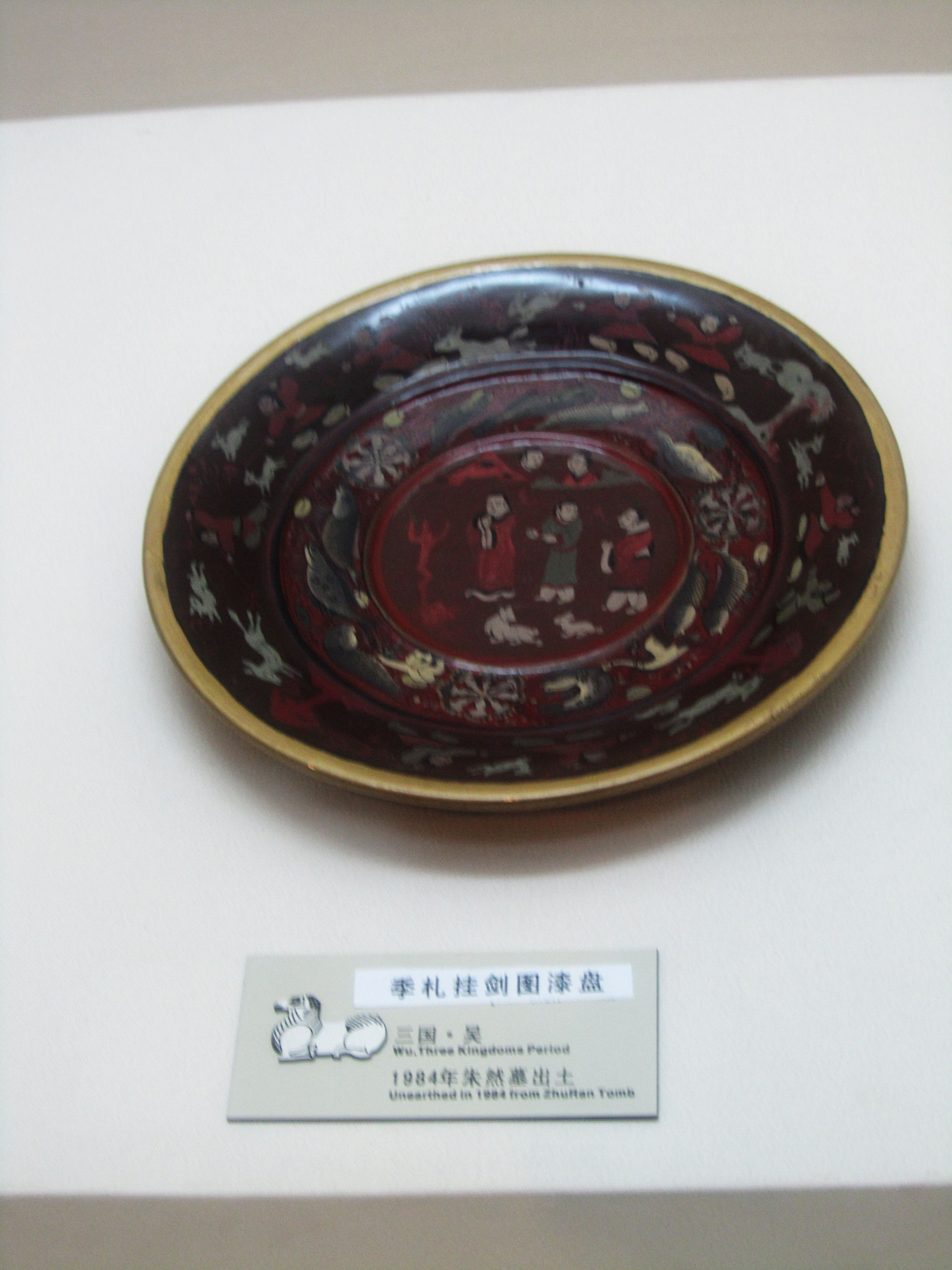
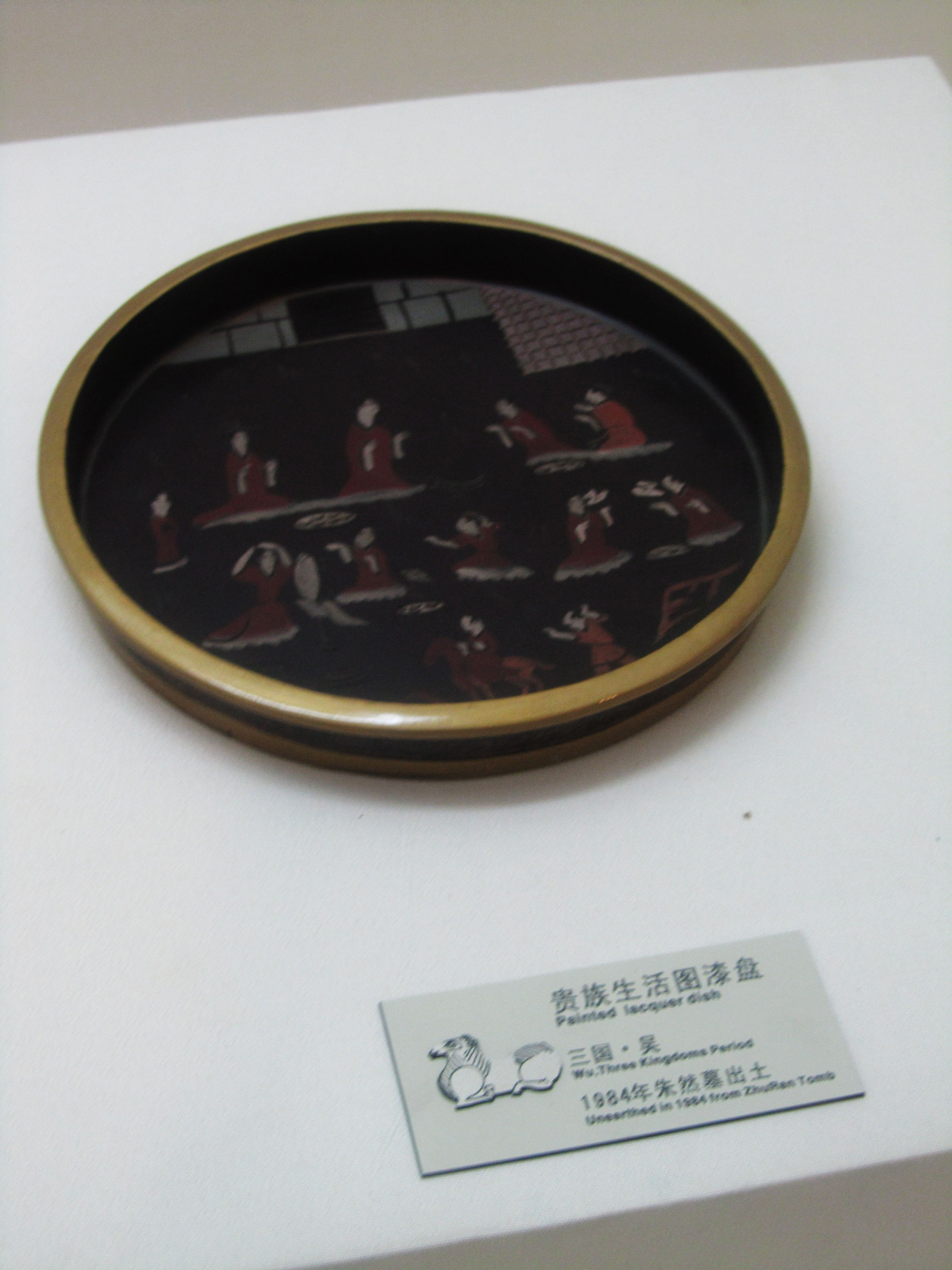
Painted lacquerware dishes from the tomb of Zhu Ran (182–249) in Anhui province, Eastern Wu period, showing figures wearing silk Hanfu attire

Under the rule of Wu, the Yangtze River Delta region, regarded in early history as a barbaric "jungle", developed into one of the commercial, cultural, and political centres of China. The achievements of Wu in the south marked the coming of Chinese civilization to the farthest southern reaches of the empire.

In 230, the island of Yizhou (夷州) was reached by the Chinese during the Three Kingdoms period under the reign of Sun Quan, who dispatched officials to the island in an abortive atttempt to establish contact with the native population. The identification of Yizhou is open to dispute; some historians believe it was Taiwan, while others believe it was the Ryukyu Islands. Wu merchants also may have reached Southern Vietnam and Cambodia. Eastern Wu also attempted to establish relations with the Liaodong state of Yan under Gongsun Yuan, but they were not able to rescue it when Cao Wei conquered it in 238 owing to the great distances over water. Such things cost Wu, and the achievements supposedly gained within Yizhou did not cover this problem and Sun Quan lost his vassal.

Eastern Wu had encountered stiff resistance from Cao Wei in Hefei. Since the 230s, this task was made harder due to the "New City", a heavily fortified castle built at Hefei by Wei. One of the greatest failures in Wu's later reign was during 255 and during the last few years of the 250s when Guanqiu Jian and Wen Qin rebelled against Wei. Wu promised to help the two in Shouchun (around present-day Shou County, Anhui). However, the Wu forces never made it in time before the rebellion was quashed by Sima Shi and the Wei forces. When Zhuge Dan launched a massive full-scale rebellion, the Wu forces suffered a great defeat as they lent a great quantity of manpower to Zhuge Dan's cause. Shouchun was quickly regained by Wei under Sima Zhao's command. Wu was also not able to come to Shu's aid during the conquest of Shu by Wei in 263 due to a revolt in Vietnam.

The decline of Wu was made apparent after the death of Sun Quan in 252. Sun Quan's successors could do little for the empire. Corruption plagued Wu, which led to an easy conquest of Wu by the Jin dynasty in 280.

== List of territories ==
Territories of Eastern Wu
Province	Provincial capital	Commandery	Commandery capital	No. of counties
Yang 揚	Jianye 建業 (now Nanjing)	Danyang 丹陽	Jianye 建業	16
Yang 揚	Jianye 建業 (now Nanjing)	Wu 吳	Wu County 吳縣	10
Yang 揚	Jianye 建業 (now Nanjing)	Qichun 蘄春	Qichun 蘄春	2
Yang 揚	Jianye 建業 (now Nanjing)	Kuaiji 會稽	Shanyin County 山陰縣	10
Yang 揚	Jianye 建業 (now Nanjing)	Yuzhang 豫章	Nanchang 南昌	16
Yang 揚	Jianye 建業 (now Nanjing)	Lujiang 廬江	Wan County 皖縣	2
Yang 揚	Jianye 建業 (now Nanjing)	Luling 廬陵	Gaochang County 高昌縣	10
Yang 揚	Jianye 建業 (now Nanjing)	Poyang 鄱陽	Poyang County 鄱陽縣	9
Yang 揚	Jianye 建業 (now Nanjing)	Xindu 新都	Shixin County 始新縣	6
Yang 揚	Jianye 建業 (now Nanjing)	Linchuan 臨川	Nancheng County 南城縣	10
Yang 揚	Jianye 建業 (now Nanjing)	Linhai 臨海	Zhang'an County 章安縣	7
Yang 揚	Jianye 建業 (now Nanjing)	Jian'an 建安	Jian'an County 建安縣	9
Yang 揚	Jianye 建業 (now Nanjing)	Wuxing 吳興	Wucheng County 烏程縣	9
Yang 揚	Jianye 建業 (now Nanjing)	Dongyang 東陽	Changshan County 長山縣	9
Yang 揚	Jianye 建業 (now Nanjing)	Piling 毗陵典農校尉	Piling County 毗陵縣	3
Yang 揚	Jianye 建業 (now Nanjing)	South Luling 廬陵南部都尉	Yudu County 雩都縣	6
Jing 荊	Jiangling 江陵 (now Jingzhou)	Nan 南	Jiangling 江陵	9
Jing 荊	Jiangling 江陵 (now Jingzhou)	Wuling 武陵	Linyuan County 臨沅縣	11
Jing 荊	Jiangling 江陵 (now Jingzhou)	Lingling 零陵	Quanling County 泉陵縣	10
Jing 荊	Jiangling 江陵 (now Jingzhou)	Guiyang 桂陽	Chen County 郴縣	6
Jing 荊	Jiangling 江陵 (now Jingzhou)	Changsha 長沙	Linxiang County 臨湘縣	10
Jing 荊	Jiangling 江陵 (now Jingzhou)	Wuchang (Note: Divided from the original Jiangxia Commandery. When Eastern Wu took control of the commandery, it was unknown whether it still existed. The commandery capital was unknown.) 武昌	Wuchang County 武昌縣	6
Jing 荊	Jiangling 江陵 (now Jingzhou)	Ancheng 安成	Ancheng County 安成縣	6
Jing 荊	Jiangling 江陵 (now Jingzhou)	Pengze 彭澤	Pengze County 彭澤縣	4
Jing 荊	Jiangling 江陵 (now Jingzhou)	Yidu 宜都	Yidao County 夷道縣	3
Jing 荊	Jiangling 江陵 (now Jingzhou)	Linhe 臨賀	Linhe County 臨賀縣	6
Jing 荊	Jiangling 江陵 (now Jingzhou)	Hengyang 衡陽	Xiangnan County 湘南縣	10
Jing 荊	Jiangling 江陵 (now Jingzhou)	Xiangdong 湘東	Ling County 酃縣	6
Jing 荊	Jiangling 江陵 (now Jingzhou)	Jianping 建平	Wu County 巫縣	6
Jing 荊	Jiangling 江陵 (now Jingzhou)	Tianmen 天門	Lüzhong County 漊中縣	3
Jing 荊	Jiangling 江陵 (now Jingzhou)	Zhaoling 昭陵	Zhaoling County 昭陵縣	5
Jing 荊	Jiangling 江陵 (now Jingzhou)	Shi'an 始安	Shi'an County 始安縣	7
Jing 荊	Jiangling 江陵 (now Jingzhou)	Shixing 始興	Qujiang County 曲江縣	7
Guang 廣	Panyu 番禺 (now Guangzhou)	Nanhai 南海	Panyu County 番禺縣	6
Guang 廣	Panyu 番禺 (now Guangzhou)	Cangwu 蒼梧	Guangxin County 廣信縣	11
Guang 廣	Panyu 番禺 (now Guangzhou)	Yulin 鬱林	Bushan County 布山縣	9
Guang 廣	Panyu 番禺 (now Guangzhou)	Gaoliang 高涼	Siping County 思平縣	3
Guang 廣	Panyu 番禺 (now Guangzhou)	Gaoxing 高興	Guanghua County 廣化縣	5
Guang 廣	Panyu 番禺 (now Guangzhou)	Guilin 桂林	Wu'an County 武安縣	6
Guang 廣	Panyu 番禺 (now Guangzhou)	North Hepu 合浦北部尉	Anguang County 安廣縣	3
Jiao 交	Longbian 龍編	Jiaozhi 交阯	Longbian 龍編	14
Jiao 交	Longbian 龍編	Rinan 日南	Zhuwu 朱吾	5
Jiao 交	Longbian 龍編	Jiuzhen 九真	Xupu 胥浦	6
Jiao 交	Longbian 龍編	Hepu 合浦	Hepu County 合浦縣	5
Jiao 交	Longbian 龍編	Wuping 武平	Wuning 武寧	7
Jiao 交	Longbian 龍編	Jiude 九德	Jiude 九德	6
Jiao 交	Longbian 龍編	Xinchang 新昌	Jianing 嘉寧	4
Jiao 交	Longbian 龍編	Zhuya 朱崖	Xuwen County 徐聞縣	2

== List of sovereigns ==
Eastern Wu rulers
Temple name	Posthumous name	Family name (in bold) and personal name	Reign	Era names and their year ranges	Notes
Shizu 始祖	Emperor Wulie 武烈皇帝	Sun Jian 孫堅	(N/A)	(N/A)	Sun Jian's temple and posthumous names were granted posthumously by Sun Quan.
(N/A)	Prince Huan of Changsha 長沙桓王	Sun Ce 孫策	(N/A)	(N/A)	Sun Ce's posthumous name was granted posthumously by Sun Quan.
Taizu 太祖	Emperor Da 大皇帝	Sun Quan 孫權	Nov 222– May 252	Huangwu 黃武 (222–229); Huanglong 黃龍 (229–231); Jiahe 嘉禾 (232–238); Chiwu 赤烏 (238–251); Taiyuan 太元 (251–252); Shenfeng 神鳳 (252)	Sun Quan adopted the era name "Huangwu" in 222 after declaring independence from Wei. However, he continued ruling under the title "King of Wu" and did not proclaim himself emperor until 229.
(N/A)	(N/A)	Sun Liang	252–258	Jianxing 建興 (252–253); Wufeng 五鳳 (254–256); Taiping 太平 (256–258)	Sun Liang became "Prince of Kuaiji" (會稽王) after he was dethroned by Sun Chen in 258. In 260, his successor Sun Xiu further demoted him to "Marquis of Houguan" (侯官侯).
(N/A)	Emperor Jing 景皇帝	Sun Xiu 孫休	258–264	Yong'an 永安 (258–264)	
(N/A)	Emperor Wen 文皇帝	Sun He 孫和	(N/A)	(N/A)	Sun He's posthumous name was granted posthumously by Sun Hao.
(N/A)	Emperor Mo 末帝	Sun Hao 孫皓	264–280	Yuanxing 元興 (264–265); Ganlu 甘露 (265–266); Baoding 寶鼎 (266–269); Jianheng 建衡 (269–271); Fenghuang 鳳凰 (272–274); Tiance 天冊 (275–276); Tianxi 天璽 (276); Tianji 天紀 (277–280)	Sun Hao held the title of "Marquis of Wucheng" (烏程侯) before he became emperor in 264. In 280, after surrendering to the Jin dynasty, he was granted the title of "Marquis of Guiming" (歸命侯) by Sima Yan. He is also sometimes referred to as "Emperor Mo of Wu" (吳末帝), which literally means "last emperor of Wu".

== Emperors' family tree ==
Eastern Wu

Sun Zhong 孫鍾
Sun Jian 孫堅 c. 155–191	Sun Jing 孫靜
175–200; Sun Ce 孫策; Marquis of Wu; 197–200	182–252; Sun Quan 孫權; 229–252; Emperor Da 大帝	Sun Gao 孫暠
Sun Deng 孫登; 209–241	Sun He 孫和; 223–253	235–264; Sun Xiu 孫休; 258–264; Emperor Jing 景帝	243–260; Sun Liang 孫亮; 252–258; Prince of Kuaiji 會稽王	Sun Chuo 孫綽	Sun Gong 孫恭
242–284; Sun Hao 孫皓; 264–280	Sun Chen 孫綝; 231–258	Sun Jun 孫峻; 219–256

== Gallery ==
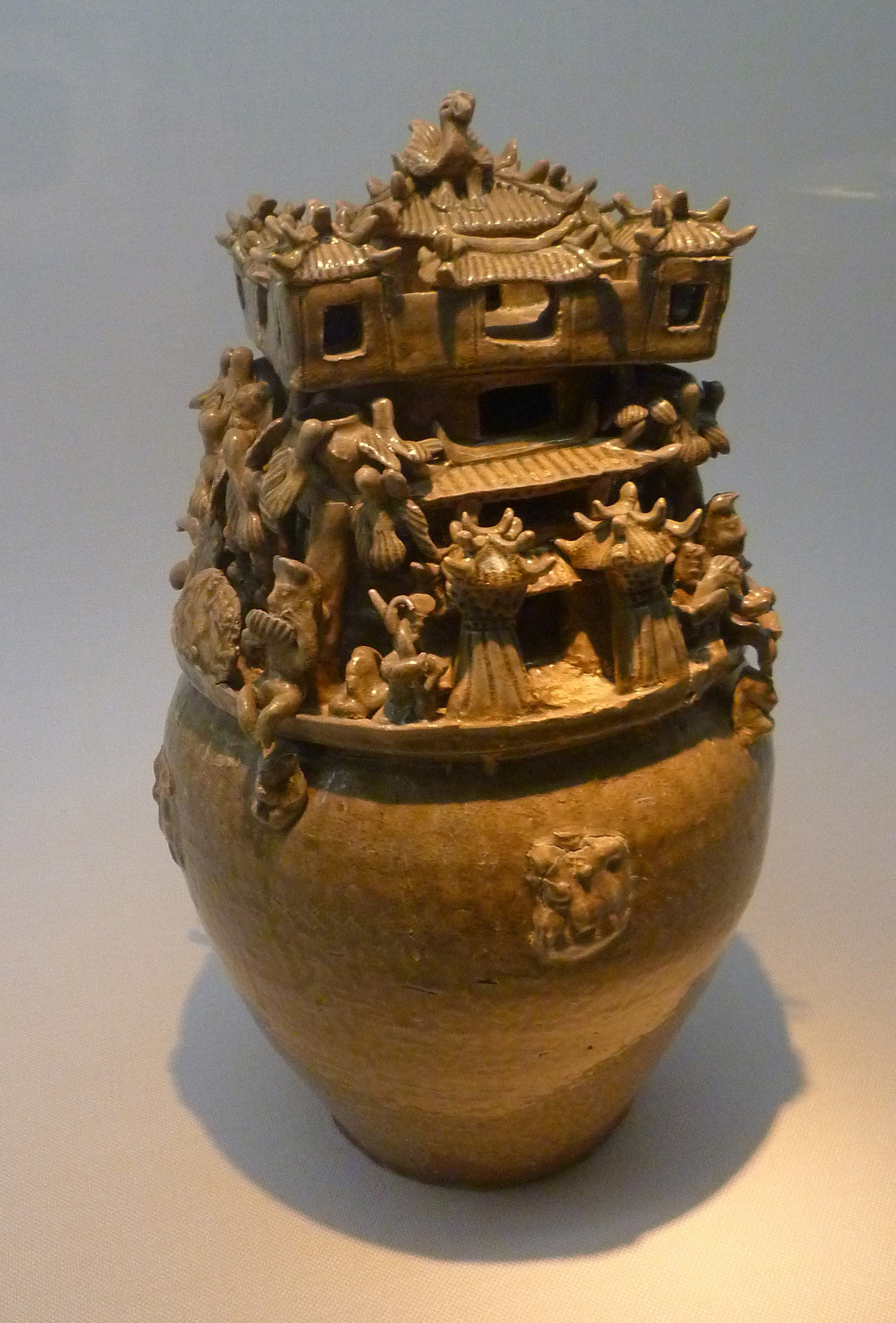
An Eastern Wu funeral urn, dating from the third century, on display in a museum in Tokyo, Japan.

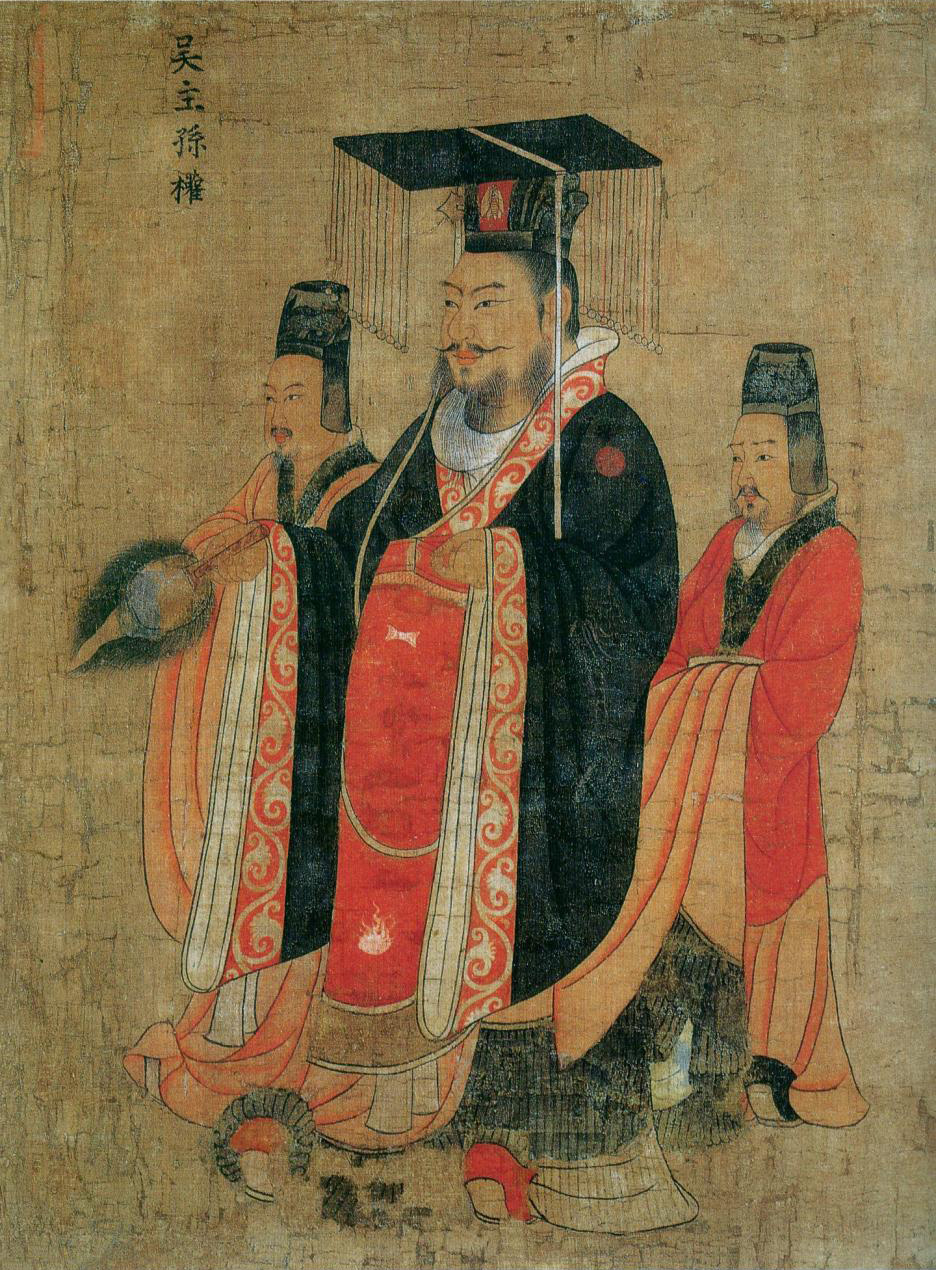
A portrait of Sun Quan painted by Yan Liben in the Tang dynasty.

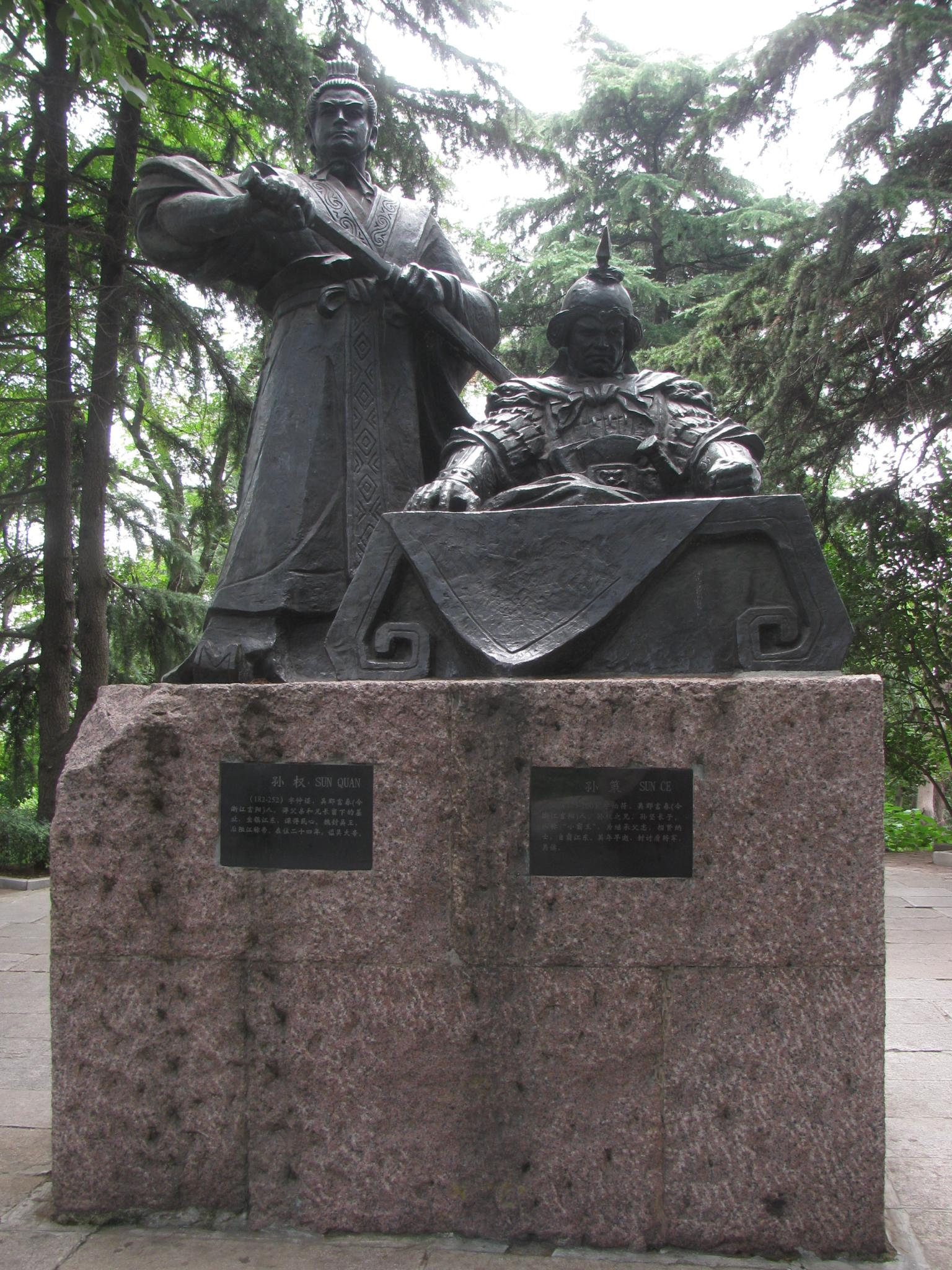
Statues of Sun Quan (left) and Sun Ce.

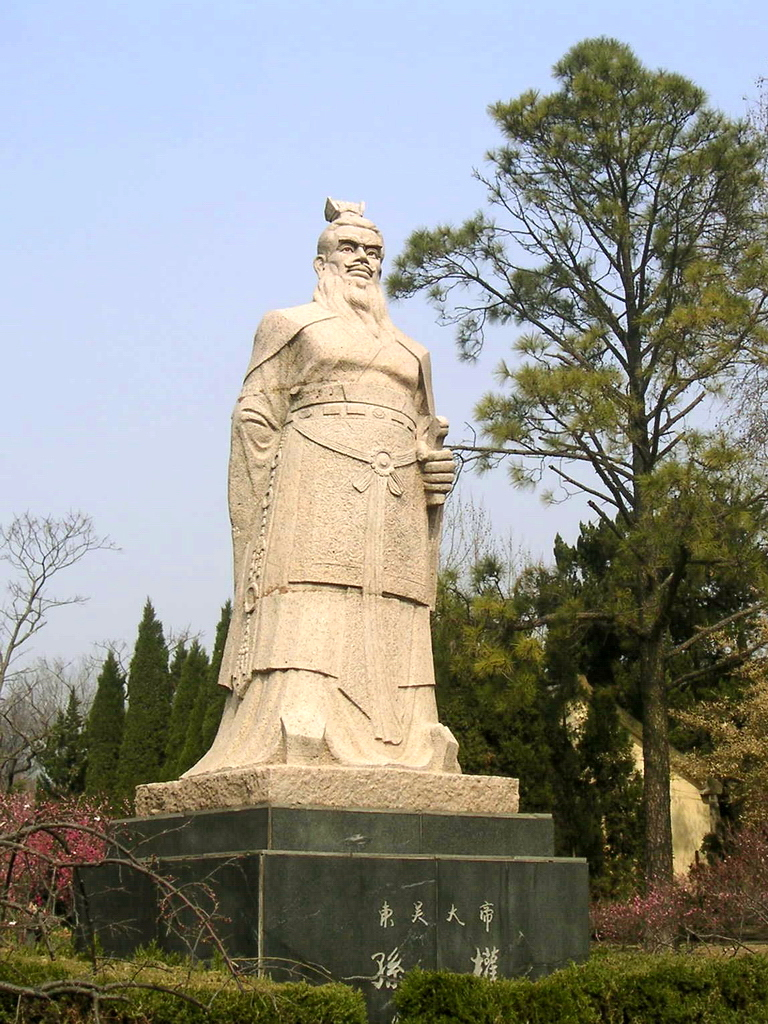
A statue of Sun Quan at Meihua Hill, Purple Mountain, Nanjing, Jiangsu.

== See also ==
- Eastern Wu family trees
- Three Kingdoms
- Cao Wei
- Shu Han

== Bibliography ==
- de Crespigny, Rafe (2007). A Biographical Dictionary of Later Han to the Three Kingdoms. Brill.
- de Crespigny, Rafe (2004) [1990]. "Empire in the South". Generals of the South: The Foundation and Early History of the Three Kingdoms State of Wu. Internet. Canberra, ACT: Faculty of Asian Studies, The Australian National University. ISBN 0731509013. Archived from the original on 10 May 2015.
- Taylor, Jay (1983). The Birth of the Vietnamese. University of California Press.
