= Sun Xiu =

Emperor of Eastern Wu from 258 to 264

Emperor Jing of Wu 吳景帝

Emperor of Eastern Wu
- Reign: 30 November 258 – 3 September 264
- Predecessor: Sun Liang
- Successor: Sun Hao

Prince of Langya (琅邪王)
- Tenure: January or February 252 – 30 November 258
- Born: 235 (Note: Sun Xiu's biography in the Sanguozhi recorded that he died on the guiwei day of the 7th month of the 7th year of the Yong'an era of his reign, and that he was 30 (by East Asian age reckoning) when he died. His death date corresponds to 3 September 264 in the Gregorian calendar. Since he was 29 when he died, by calculation he was born in 235.)
- Died: 3 September 264 (aged 29)
- Consort: Empress Jing
- Issue: Sun Wan; Sun Gong; Sun Mang; Sun Bao
Names
- Family name: Sun (孫); Given name: Xiu (休); Courtesy name: Zilie (子烈)
Era dates
- Yong'an (永安): 258–264
Posthumous name
- Emperor Jing (景帝)
- House: House of Sun
- Father: Sun Quan
- Mother: Empress Jinghuai

Sun Xiu (235 – 3 September 264), courtesy name Zilie, formally known as Emperor Jing of Wu, was the third emperor of the state of Eastern Wu during the Three Kingdoms period of China.

== Early life ==
Sun Xiu was born in 235 to Wu's founding emperor, Sun Quan, and one of his concubines, Consort Wang. He was Sun Quan's sixth son. In his youth, he was praised for his studiousness. About 250, Sun Quan arranged for a marriage between Sun Xiu and Lady Zhu, the daughter of Sun Quan's daughter Sun Luyu and her husband Zhu Ju.

In 252, just before Sun Quan's death, he enfeoffed Sun Xiu as the Prince of Langya, with his princedom at Hulin (虎林; in present-day Chizhou, Anhui). Later that year, after his younger brother Sun Liang became emperor, the regent Zhuge Ke did not want the princes to be based near the important military bases along the Yangtze River, so he moved Sun Xiu to Danyang Commandery (丹陽郡; in present-day Xuancheng, Anhui). Unlike his brother Sun Fen (孫奮), Sun Xiu did not resist Zhuge Ke's move. Once he was at Danyang Commandery, the commandery administrator Li Heng (李衡) found many excuses to bully him. Sun Xiu could not endure Li Heng's bullying so he requested to be relocated elsewhere. Sun Liang then issued an order relocating him to Kuaiji Commandery (around present-day Shaoxing, Zhejiang).

In 255, at the instigation of Sun Xiu's sister Sun Luban, the regent Sun Jun had Sun Luyu, Sun Xiu's half-sister and mother-in-law, executed. Sun Xiu began to fear for his own safety, so he sent his wife Princess Zhu back to the imperial capital Jianye and offered to divorce her, but Sun Jun declined his request and sent Princess Zhu back to Sun Xiu.

In November 258, after a failed coup against the regent Sun Chen (Sun Jun's cousin and successor), Sun Liang was deposed and replaced with Sun Xiu as the new emperor of Wu.

== Coup against Sun Chen ==
After his accession, Sun Xiu ordered five new counties to be added to Sun Chen's marquisate to appease him, in addition to enfeoffing Sun Chen's brothers as marquises too. However, Sun Chen soon fell out with Sun Xiu over a relatively small incident – he brought food and wine to the imperial palace and asked the emperor to dine with him, but the emperor refused. Sun Chen then went to dine with the general Zhang Bu instead and casually remarked that he could replace Sun Xiu easily if he wanted to. Later Zhang Bu secretly reported Sun Chen's dissatisfaction to Sun Xiu. Although Sun Xiu continued to pretend to be friendly towards Sun Chen, he began to discreetly prepare to defend himself against Sun Chen. At the same time, Sun Chen had become worried about his relationship with Sun Xiu. So he requested permission to go to Wuchang (武昌; present-day Ezhou, Hubei) and oversee the defences at the border.

Although Sun Xiu approved Sun Chen's request, he suspected that Sun Chen wanted to seize control of Wuchang and then rebel against him. Another official, Wei Miao (魏邈), also warned Sun Xiu that Sun Chen might be plotting treason when he asked to leave for Wuchang. By this time, there were widespread rumours that Sun Chen was disloyal towards Sun Xiu. Sun Xiu then conspired with Zhang Bu and another general Ding Feng to assassinate Sun Chen at a feast during the Laba Festival (8th day of the 12th lunar month). Sun Chen got wind of the plot, but still attended the feast where he was captured by Zhang Bu and Ding Feng's soldiers. When Sun Chen begged for his life and pleaded to be exiled to Jiao Province or reduced to the status of a slave, Sun Xiu refused to spare him and told him that he did not spare Teng Yin or Lü Ju either when he came to power in 256. Sun Xiu then ordered Sun Chen to be executed along with his family members.

== Reign ==
As emperor, Sun Xiu was known for being tolerant of differing opinions, as well as his studiousness. However, he did not appear to be a particularly capable emperor, either in military or domestic matters, and he entrusted most of the important affairs to Zhang Bu and Puyang Xing, neither of whom was particularly capable either. Both were also moderately corrupt. The government was therefore not efficient or effective. For example, in 260, with Puyang Xing's support, a costly project was started to create an artificial lake known as the Puli Lake near present-day Xuancheng, Anhui for irrigation purposes, even though many officials believed the project to be too costly and without any guarantee of success. Eventually, the project had to be abandoned when it became clear that it could not be completed.

In the first year of his reign, a precursor to the Nanking Imperial University was established, with Wei Zhao being the first president.

In 260, Sun Xiu, who had always been concerned about plots regarding his brother, deposed Emperor Sun Liang, acted after receiving false reports that Sun Liang had used witchcraft. He had Sun Liang demoted from the status of Prince of Kuaiji to Marquis of Houguan and sent him to his marquisate (in present-day Fuzhou, Fujian). Sun Liang died en route to Houguan – with the popular belief being that he committed suicide, but with some historians believing that Sun Xiu poisoned him.

The Wu official Xue Xu, who visited Wu's ally state Shu Han in 261, provided a description of Shu to Sun Xiu upon his return as follows:

The emperor is incompetent and does not know his errors; his subordinates just try to get by without causing trouble for themselves. When I was visiting them, I heard no honest words, and when I visited their countryside, the people looked hungry. I have heard of a story of swallows and sparrows making nests on top of mansions and being content, believing that it was the safest place, not realising that the haystack and the support beams were on fire and that disaster was about to come. This might be what they are like.

Historians largely believe that Xue Xu was not just referring to Shu, but rather using Shu's situation as an allegory to warn Sun Xiu that Wu was in a similar situation. Sun Xiu did not seem to have understood what Xue Xu meant.

In 262, Sun Xiu instated his wife Princess Zhu as the empress. He also designated his eldest son, Sun Wan, as the crown prince.

In 263, due to the corruption of the commandery governor Sun Xu (孫諝), the people of Jiaozhi (交趾; present-day Hanoi, Vietnam) rebelled, and they were joined by the people in the neighbouring Jiuzhen (九真; modern Thanh Hóa, Vietnam) and Rinan (日南, modern Quang Tri, Vietnam) commanderies. The rebels also sought military assistance from Wu's rival state, Wei. (Wei and its successor state, the Jin dynasty, did provide assistance to the rebels. Besides, the rebellion was not suppressed until 271, some years well into the reign of Sun Xiu's successor, Sun Hao.)

In 263, when Wu's ally state Shu came under attack by their rival state Wei, they sought assistance from Wu. Sun Xiu sent two separate armies – one to attack Shouchun (present-day Shou County, Anhui) and the other to attack Hanzhong Commandery – to distract the Wei army and force them to withdraw from Shu. However, both armies never succeeded in their mission. The Shu emperor Liu Shan surrendered to Wei later that year, thus bringing Shu's existence to an end. When Sun Xiu heard that some former Shu commanderies were at a loss on what to do after Liu Shan's surrender, he sent his troops in an attempt to conquer them for Wu. However, Luo Xian, a former Shu general stationed at Badong Commandery (巴東郡; around the present-day Three Gorges Dam), managed to hold his ground against the Wu invasion and eventually surrendered to Wei.

In the summer of 264, Sun Xiu became ill and could not speak, but could still write, so he wrote an edict summoning Puyang Xing to the imperial palace, where he entrusted the crown prince Sun Wan to Puyang Xing. Sun Xiu died soon thereafter. Puyang Xing, however, did not follow Sun Xiu's dying wish and make Sun Wan the new emperor. Instead, after discussing with Zhang Bu, he decided to put an older and more mature emperor on the throne. (It is unknown how old Sun Wan was at the time of Sun Xiu's death, but since Sun Xiu was 29 when he died, it was most likely that Sun Wan was still a child then.) On the recommendation of Wan Yu, Puyang Xing and Zhang Bu installed Sun Hao, a son of Sun He (crown prince during Sun Quan's reign), on the throne.

A tomb located in Dangtu County, Anhui is assumed to belong to Sun Xiu and Lady Zhu.

== Family ==
- Empress Jing, of the Zhu clan (景皇后), daughter of Sun Luyu
  - Sun Wan, Crown Prince (太子 孙湾, d.266), 1st son
  - Sun Mang, Prince of Liang (梁王 孙壾, d. 265), 3rd son
- Unknown
  - Sun Gong, Prince of Runan (汝南王 孙熕), 2nd son
  - Sun Mao, Prince of Chen ( 陳王 孙緢), 4th son

== See also ==
- Lists of people of the Three Kingdoms
- List of Chinese monarchs

== Notes ==
Emperor Jing of Eastern Wu House of Sun Born: 235 Died: 264
Regnal titles
Preceded by Sun Liang	Emperor of Eastern Wu; 258–264	Succeeded by Sun Hao
Titles in pretence
Preceded by Sun Liang	— TITULAR — Emperor of China; 258–264; Reason for succession failure: Three Kingdoms	Succeeded by Sun Hao
