= Shi Ji (Eastern Wu) =

Chinese Eastern Wu general (died 270)

- 施績

Left Grand Marshal (左大司馬) (alongside Ding Feng)
- In office September 264 – c. May 270
- Monarch: Sun Hao
- Succeeded by: Lu Kang

Protector-General Controller (都護督)
- In office c. 258 – September 264
- Monarch: Sun Xiu

Upper General-in-Chief (上大將軍)
- In office c. 258 – September 264
- Monarch: Sun Xiu

General of Agile Cavalry (驃騎將軍)
- In office 257 – c. 258
- Monarch: Sun Liang

General Who Guards the East (鎮東將軍)
- In office 252 – 253
- Monarch: Sun Liang

Area Commander of Le District (樂鄉督)
- In office 253 – 257
- Monarch: Sun Liang

General Who Pacifies Wei (平魏將軍)
- In office 249 – 253
- Monarch: Sun Quan / Sun Liang

Commandant Who Establishes Loyalty (建忠都尉)
- In office ?–?
- Monarch: Sun Quan

Personal details
- Born: Unknown
- Died: c. May 270 (Note: Sun Hao's biography in the Sanguozhi recorded that Shi Ji died in the 4th month of the 2nd year of the Jianheng era of Sun Hao's reign. This month corresponds to 8 May to 5 June 270 in the Gregorian calendar.)
- Children: Shi Shunü
- Parent: Zhu Ran (father)
- Occupation: Military general
- Courtesy name: Gongxu (公緒)
- Other name: Zhu Ji (朱績)
- Peerage: Marquis of Dangyang (當陽侯)

Shi Ji (died c. May 270), also known as Zhu Ji, courtesy name Gongxu, was a Chinese military general of the state of Eastern Wu during the Three Kingdoms period of China. He was the son of Zhu Ran, a general who served under Wu's founding emperor Sun Quan.

== Family background ==
Shi Ji was a son of Zhu Ran, a general who served under Wu's founding emperor Sun Quan. Zhu Ran's family name was actually Shi (施), but he changed his family name to Zhu (朱) as he was adopted by his maternal uncle Zhu Zhi. Shi Ji initially took on the family name of Zhu, but sometime between 254 and 256 he received permission from the second Wu emperor Sun Liang to change his family name to Shi.

== Service under Sun Quan ==
With help from his father, Shi Ji started his career as a Gentleman (郎) serving the Wu imperial palace. Later, as he grew older, he was commissioned as a commandant under the title "Commandant Who Establishes Loyalty" (建忠都尉). After his uncle Zhu Cai (朱才) died, Shi Ji was put in charge of the troops who used to be under Zhu Cai's command. In 231, he followed Pan Jun on a campaign against rebellious local tribes in Wuling Commandery (武陵郡; around present-day Changde, Hunan), and became famous for his courage and strength in battle. Shi Ji subsequently served as a supervising officer in charge of dealing with bandits and robbers, and was known for sternly upholding the law. Through his actions, Shi Ji attracted the attention of Sun Ba, the Prince of Lu, Sun Quan's fourth son. When Sun Ba visited Shi Ji in his office and offered to start a friendship with him, Shi Ji knew his place so he remained humble (e.g. remained standing when Sun Ba sat down) and politely declined.

Sometime in the 240s, a power struggle broke out between Sun Ba and his third brother Sun He, the Crown Prince, as the former wanted to seize the position of heir apparent from the latter. Two opposing factions also emerged from among Sun Quan's subjects: On one side, Shi Ji, along with Lu Xun, Zhuge Ke, Gu Tan, Zhu Ju, Teng Yin, Ding Mi (丁密) and Wu Can, believed that Sun He was the rightful heir apparent so they supported him. On the other side, Bu Zhi, Lü Dai, Quan Cong, Lü Ju, Sun Hong (孫弘), Quan Ji (全寄), Yang Zhu (楊笁), Wu An (吳安) and Sun Qi (孫奇) supported Sun Ba. The power struggle ended in 250 when Sun Quan deposed Sun He and replaced him with Sun Liang, and forced Sun Ba to commit suicide.

When his father Zhu Ran died in 249, Shi Ji inherited his father's peerage as the Marquis of Dangyang (當陽侯) and was subsequently promoted to General Who Pacifies Wei (平魏將軍) and appointed as the Area Commander of Le District (樂鄉; east of present-day Songzi, Hubei).

In 250, Wang Chang, a senior general from Wu's rival state Wei, led the Wei forces to attack the Wu-controlled Jiangling County (江陵縣; in present-day Jingzhou, Hubei). When Wang Chang was withdrawing his troops after failing to breach Jiangling County's walls, Shi Ji wrote to the Wu general Zhuge Rong: "(Wang) Chang has come a long way; he and his men are weary and their horses have no more fodder. Heaven is on our side. I don't have enough men to attack them so I hope you can lead your troops to support me. I will attack them from the front while you can mop them up from the rear. The glory won't be only mine; this is an opportunity for us to work together." After Zhuge Rong promised to help him, Shi Ji then led his troops to attack Wang Chang and his men at Jinan (紀南), which was located about 30 li away from Jiangling County. Although Shi Ji initially had the upper hand, he ultimately lost the battle when Zhuge Rong broke his promise and did not show up to help him. After the battle, the Wu emperor Sun Quan praised Shi Ji, but severely reprimanded Zhuge Rong and wanted to relieve him of his appointment. However, he eventually pardoned Zhuge Rong as he had to "give face" to Zhuge Rong's brother Zhuge Ke, whom he favoured and heavily relied on. As Shi Ji was initially already not on good terms with Zhuge Ke and Zhuge Rong, this incident further deepened the rift between him and the Zhuge brothers.

== Service under Sun Liang ==
After Sun Quan died in 252, his youngest son Sun Liang became the next Wu emperor, with Zhuge Ke serving as regent. In the same year, Sun Liang appointed Shi Ji as General Who Guards the East (鎮東將軍).

In the spring of 253, when Zhuge Ke was away leading Wu forces to attack the Wei fortress of Xincheng at Hefei, he requested support from Shi Ji's units but did not bring Shi Ji along and instead ordered him to remain at Banzhou (半州). He then granted his brother Zhuge Rong acting imperial authority and ordered him to take command of Shi Ji's units and lead them towards the Mian River to attack Wei reinforcements coming from the west to reinforce Xincheng.

In the winter of 253, Sun Jun, a distant cousin of Sun Quan, overthrew and assassinated Zhuge Ke in a coup d'état. He then ordered Shi Kuan (施寬), Shi Ji, Sun Yi (孫壹) and Quan Xi (全熈) to lead their troops to Gong'an County to arrest Zhuge Rong. Zhuge Rong ultimately committed suicide while his three sons and Zhuge Ke's extended family were rounded up and executed. After the coup d'état, Sun Jun became the new regent and he granted acting imperial authority to Shi Ji and ordered him to revert to his previous appointment as the Area Commander of Le District (樂鄉; east of present-day Songzi, Hubei).

In 257, Shi Ji was promoted to General of Agile Cavalry (驃騎將軍), one of the top positions in the Wu military. In the previous year, following Sun Jun's death, his cousin Sun Chen succeeded him as the regent of Wu. When Sun Chen was in power, he caused fear and panic among the Wu officials when he started purging his political opponents. Shi Ji worried that Sun Chen's actions would lead to a civil war in Wu, and feared that Wu's rival state Wei would take advantage of the internal conflict to attack Wu. He then secretly contacted Wu's ally state Shu and requested their support. In response, the Shu government sent a general Yan Yu to lead 5,000 troops to stand by at Baidicheng near the Wu–Shu border and assist Shi Ji when necessary.

== Service under Sun Xiu and Sun Hao ==
In 258, Sun Chen deposed the Wu emperor Sun Liang, whom he had a falling-out with, and replaced him with his brother Sun Xiu. Later that year, with assistance from the generals Zhang Bu and Ding Feng, Sun Xiu ousted Sun Chen from power and executed him. At the beginning of his short reign, Sun Xiu appointed Shi Ji as Upper General-in-Chief (上大將軍) and Protector-General Controller (都護督), and ordered him to relocate his headquarters from Baqiu (巴丘; present-day Yueyang, Hunan) to Xiling (西陵; present-day Yichang, Hubei).

Shi Ji continued serving under Sun Xiu's successor, Sun Hao, after Sun Xiu died in 264. In the same year, Sun Hao appointed Shi Ji as Left Grand Marshal (左大司馬). Shi Ji died in 270.

The Zhen'gao recorded that Shi Ji had a daughter, Shi Shunü (施淑女).

== See also ==
- Lists of people of the Three Kingdoms
