= Tang Zi =

3rd-century Chinese Eastern Wu general

- 唐咨

General Who Stabilises Distant Lands (安遠將軍)
- In office 258 – ?
- Monarch: Cao Mao / Cao Huan

General of the Vanguard (前將軍)
- In office 252 – 258
- Monarch: Sun Liang

Personal details
- Born: Unknown Linshu County, Shandong / Lianyungang, Jiangsu
- Died: Unknown
- Occupation: General

Tang Zi (fl. 200–262) was a military general of the state of Eastern Wu during the Three Kingdoms period (220–280) of China. In 258, he defected to Wu's rival state, Cao Wei, and became a general under Wei.

== Life ==
Tang Zi was from Licheng Commandery (利城郡; between southeast of present-day Linshu County, Shandong and northwest of present-day Ganyu District, Lianyungang, Jiangsu). In 225, Cai Fang (蔡方) started a rebellion in Licheng Commandery, killed the commandery Administrator Xu Ji (徐箕), and nominated Tang Zi to be their leader. The Wei emperor Cao Pi ordered Ren Fu (任福), Duan Zhao (段昭), Wang Ling and Lü Qian (呂虔) to lead troops to suppress the revolt. After the Wei forces defeated the rebels and retook Licheng Commandery, Tang Zi fled south to Wu via the sea and became a Wu military officer.

Between 235 and 236, Tang Zi participated in a campaign against the restive Shanyue tribes in Wu territories along with the Wu generals Lü Dai and Wu Can. After the campaign, he was promoted to the rank of a general for his contributions. Later, he and Wu Can led 3,000 troops to attack the Shanyue led by Dong Si (董嗣) but could not overcome the enemy until reinforcements led by another Wu general, Zhou Fang, showed up. In 239, he joined Lü Dai in quelling a revolt by Liao Shi (廖式).

In 252, Tang Zi fought at the Battle of Dongxing against Wu's rival state, Wei, alongside other Wu generals such as Liu Zan, Lü Ju and Ding Feng. He was promoted to General of the Vanguard (前將軍), granted imperial authority, and enfeoffed as a marquis for his achievements in the battle.

In 256, Tang Zi joined Wen Qin, Lü Ju, Liu Zuan (劉纂) and Zhu Yi to resist a Wei invasion in the regions around the Huai and Si rivers (in present-day Anhui). In the same year, after the Wu regent Sun Jun died, Tang Zi sided with Sun Jun's cousin Sun Chen in a power struggle and killed Lü Ju, thus clearing the way for Sun Chen to succeed Sun Jun as the regent of Wu.

In 257, when the Wei general Zhuge Dan started a rebellion in Shouchun (壽春; present-day Shou County, Anhui), he sent his son Zhuge Jing as a hostage to Wu in exchange for support from Wu against Wei. In the following year, Sun Chen ordered Wen Qin, Tang Zi, Quan Yi (全懌), Quan Duan (全端), Wang Zuo (王祚) and others to lead 30,000 troops to Shouchun to assist Zhuge Dan in his rebellion against Wei forces led by the Wei regent Sima Zhao. When the tide turned against Zhuge Dan by early 258, Zhuge Dan and Tang Zi tried to break out of the siege but failed. After being captured by Wei forces, Tang Zi agreed to surrender and defect to Wei. Sima Zhao appointed him as General Who Stabilises Distant Lands (安遠將軍). As Sima Zhao treated the surrendered Wu soldiers well, in return the Wu government did not harm Tang Zi's family members, who were still in Wu when he defected to Wei.

In 262, when Sima Zhao was planning an invasion of Wei's other rival state, Shu, he ordered Tang Zi to supervise the construction of warships to be used in a later campaign against Wu. Nothing about Tang Zi was recorded in history after that.

== See also ==
- Lists of people of the Three Kingdoms
