= Teng Fanglan =

Empress of Eastern Wu from 264 to 280

Teng Fanglan 滕芳蘭

Empress consort of Eastern Wu
- Tenure: November 264 – 280
- Predecessor: Empress Jing
- Born: Unknown
- Died: Unknown
- Spouse: Sun Hao
- Father: Teng Mu

Empress Teng (fl. 258–284), personal name Teng Fanglan, was an empress of the state of Eastern Wu during the Three Kingdoms period of China. She married Sun Hao, the fourth and last emperor of Wu.

== Life ==
Lady Teng was the daughter of Teng Mu (滕牧). She was also a distant relative of Teng Yin, a high-ranking minister in Wu. When Teng Yin was killed in a failed attempt to overthrow the Wu regent Sun Chen in 256, Teng Mu and his family were exiled to the border. However, after Sun Xiu ascended the throne in 258 and eliminated Sun Chen, he granted amnesty to those who were condemned by Sun Chen, so Teng Mu and his family were allowed to return to the Wu capital Jianye (建業; present-day Nanjing, Jiangsu). Teng Mu became a zhonglang (中郎; a type of official) in the Bureau for All Purposes (五官曹). When Sun Hao was enfeoffed as the "Marquis of Wucheng" (烏程侯), he took Lady Teng as his concubine and instated her as the empress later when he ascended the throne in 264. He enfeoffed Teng Mu as the Marquis of Gaomi (高密侯), appointed him as the General of the Guards (衞將軍) and granted him authority over the Masters of Writing (尚書).

Sun Hao turned out to be a cruel and superstitious tyrant. His subjects were hesitant in attempting to persuade him to mend his ways, but due to Teng Mu's honoured status, they often asked Teng Mu to help them present their proposals to Sun Hao because the emperor might be offended if they gave him advice directly. Sun Hao eventually grew tired of Teng Mu's suggestions and Empress Teng fell out of her husband's favour as a consequence. In 266, Sun Hao suddenly ordered Teng Mu to move to Cangwu (蒼梧; in present-day Wuzhou, Guangxi) — effectively sending the latter into exile — even though he did not strip the latter of his titles. Teng Mu died of distress on the journey to Cangwu. Sun Hao considered deposing Empress Teng as well but his superstitious beliefs worked in the empress's favour — his sorcerers (whom he trusted) told him that replacing the empress would lead to disaster for him. Sun Hao's mother, Empress Dowager He, also intervened by protecting and speaking up for Empress Teng. Empress Teng lived with her mother-in-law and rarely saw Sun Hao again but retained her authority as the empress. At the same time, Sun Hao gave empress signets to many of his other concubines.

Little else is known about Empress Teng. When Wu was conquered by forces of the Jin dynasty in 280, she accompanied Sun Hao to the Jin capital Luoyang. When Sun Hao died in 284, Teng Fanglan felt very sad so she wrote a lament on her own to honor her husband. She eventually died in Luoyang.

Empress Teng's personal name was not recorded in her biography in the Records of the Three Kingdoms (Sanguozhi), the authoritative source of the history of the Three Kingdoms period. However, the Jiankang Shilu mentioned that her personal name was "Fanglan". Hence, she was also known as "Teng Fanglan".

== See also ==
- Eastern Wu family trees#Sun Hao (Yuanzong)
- Lists of people of the Three Kingdoms

Chinese royalty
Preceded by Empress Zhu	Empress of Eastern Wu; 264–280	Dynasty ended
Preceded by Empress Zhu	Empress of China (Southeastern); 264–280	Succeeded by Empress Yang of Jin
