= Battle of Hefei (253) =

Battle between Eastern Wu and Cao Wei in 253

- Part of the wars of the Three Kingdoms period
Date	c. April – August 253
Location	Hefei, Anhui, China
Result	Cao Wei victory; Eastern Wu retreat

Belligerents
Cao Wei	Eastern Wu

Commanders and leaders
Zhang Te; Sima Fu	Zhuge Ke

Strength
3,000 in Xincheng; 200,000 reinforcements	200,000

Casualties and losses
Unknown	Unknown

Battle of Hefei
- Traditional Chinese: 合肥之戰
- Simplified Chinese: 合肥之战
Transcriptions
Standard Mandarin
- Hanyu Pinyin: Héféi Zhī Zhàn

Battle of Hefei Xincheng
- Traditional Chinese: 合肥新城之戰
- Simplified Chinese: 合肥新城之战
Transcriptions
Standard Mandarin
- Hanyu Pinyin: Héféi Xīnchéng Zhī Zhàn

The Battle of Hefei, also known as the Battle of Hefei Xincheng, was fought between the contending states of Cao Wei and Eastern Wu from roughly April to August 253 during the Three Kingdoms period of China. It was Wu's first major battle at Hefei after the death of Sun Quan the previous year.

== The battle ==
In the spring of 253, the Wu regent Zhuge Ke returned from the Battle of Dongxing to the Wu capital Jianye (present-day Nanjing, Jiangsu). Ignoring the advice of several officials, in April 253, Zhuge Ke led a 200,000 strong army to attack Wei in the north. By May or early June, Zhuge Ke and his army had reached south of the Huai River, and started attacking the Wei fortress Xincheng (新城; literally "new city/fortress") at Hefei in the following month. Zhuge Ke's forces besieged Xincheng and launched fierce attacks on the fortress. At the time, Xincheng was guarded by the Wei general Zhang Te and his subordinates Liu Zheng (劉整) and Zheng Xiang (鄭像). The Wei forces defending Xincheng, numbering only 3,000, managed to hold off Zhuge Ke's army for more than a month while inflicting heavy casualties on the enemy.

Zhang Te told Zhuge Ke: "I have no intention of fighting now. However, according to the laws of Wei, when I am under attack for more than 100 days and reinforcements do not arrive, even if I surrender, my family will be spared from punishment. Since I first started resisting the enemy, it has been more than 90 days. This city originally had a population of more than 4,000, and now more than half of them have died in battle. Even when the city falls, if someone does not wish to surrender, I will speak to him and explain the possible implications of his choice. Tomorrow morning I will send a list of names, you can first take my tally as a token of trust." After finishing his speech, Zhang Te tossed his tally to Zhuge Ke, who did not take the tally as he believed that Zhang Te would keep his word.

That night, Zhang Te ordered his men to tear down houses and fences, and use the wood to reinforce damaged parts of the fortress walls. The next morning, Zhang Te announced to the enemy: "We shall fight to the death!", and firmly refused to surrender. The Wu soldiers were furious and attacked the fortress but were unable to breach the walls.

At that time, the weather was extremely hot and the Wu troops were growing weary. A plague broke out and killed many Wu soldiers as well as caused more than half of the Wu army to fall ill. Zhuge Ke grew impatient and vented his frustration on his subordinates, causing much unhappiness among his men. He even dismissed his subordinate, Zhu Yi. Later, the Wei general Sima Fu led 200,000 troops to reinforce Zhang Te at Xincheng and defeated the exhausted Wu army. Sometime between 12 August and 9 September 253, Zhuge Ke had no choice but to order a withdrawal and the siege on Xincheng was lifted.

== Aftermath ==
As Zhuge Ke and the Wu army withdrew from Xincheng, many of the sick and wounded soldiers died along the way or were taken prisoner by Sima Fu and his reinforcements. Zhuge Ke showed no concern towards them.

At Xunyang, Zhuge Ke halted and made plans to create an agricultural colony. The Wu emperor Sun Liang sent several edicts recalling Zhuge Ke and his army to the capital. Slowly, Zhuge Ke sent the soldiers home. After this, popular opinion turned sharply against Zhuge Ke, as the resentment of the widowed, orphaned and maimed far outweighing the goodwill Zhuge Ke had earned with his economic reforms in 252. Zhuge Ke was later killed in a coup in late 253.

15 years later, the Wu emperor Sun Hao ordered the general Ding Feng to lead an army to attack Hefei again. However, neither side saw any significant action, and the campaign ended after Ding Feng exchanged some letters with the Jin general Shi Bao, who was guarding Hefei.

== In popular culture ==
The battle is featured as a playable stage in Koei's video game series Dynasty Warriors. In 7, playable under the new Jin dynasty story, the battle is known as the "Battle of New Hefei Castle", and is not to be confused with another stage (Battle of Hefei Castle), which refers to the Battle of Hefei (234) and appears along with the former battle in the succeeding installment. In the game, however, Sima Shi, Sima Zhao, and Zhuge Dan also appear on the Wei side, despite being considered Jin officers.
