= Empress Dowager He =

Empress Dowager He (何太后) may refer to:

- Empress He (Han dynasty) (died 189), consort and empress dowager of the Han dynasty
- Empress Dowager He (Eastern Wu) (fl. 242–264), empress dowager of the Eastern Wu state
- Empress He (Tang dynasty) (died 905), consort and empress dowager of the Tang Dynasty

== See also ==
- Empress He (disambiguation)
