= Zhuge Rong =

Eastern Wu general

- 諸葛融

General of Vehement Might (奮威將軍)
- In office 252 – 253
- Monarch: Sun Liang

Commandant of Xin'an (新安都尉)
- In office ? – 252
- Monarch: Sun Quan
- Preceded by: Chen Biao

Cavalry Commandant (騎都尉)
- In office ?–?
- Monarch: Sun Quan

Personal details
- Born: After 204
- Died: c.November 253; Gong'an County, Hubei
- Relations: Zhuge Ke (brother); Zhuge Qiao (brother); Zhang Cheng's wife (sister); Zhuge Liang (uncle)
- Children: three sons
- Parent: Zhuge Jin (father)
- Occupation: General
- Courtesy name: Shuchang (叔長)
- Peerage: Marquis of Wanling (宛陵侯)

Zhuge Rong (after 204 - c.November 253), courtesy name Shuchang, was a military general of the state of Eastern Wu during the Three Kingdoms period of China. He was the third son of Zhuge Jin, a military general who served under Wu's founding emperor Sun Quan, and a younger brother of Zhuge Ke, a military general who briefly served as regent for Sun Quan's successor, Sun Liang.

== Family background ==
Zhuge Rong was the third son of Zhuge Jin, a military general who served under Wu's founding emperor, Sun Quan. He had two elder brothers: Zhuge Ke and Zhuge Qiao. His second uncle, Zhuge Liang, served as the Imperial Chancellor of Wu's ally state, Shu. As Zhuge Liang initially had no son, he adopted Zhuge Qiao. Like their father, both Zhuge Ke and Zhuge Rong served as generals in Wu. Zhuge Rong also had a sister who married Zhang Cheng, a Wu general. Zhang Cheng and Zhuge Rong's sister had a daughter who married Sun Quan's third son, Sun He.

== Early life ==
In his younger days, Zhuge Rong was known for being spoiled, brash and thrill-seeking, largely because of his elite family background. Although he enjoyed reading and had a wide breadth of knowledge, he did not specialise in any particular field. He was also known for being understanding and tolerant, and for being skilful in a range of arts and crafts. Before he reached adulthood, he had already been invited on numerous occasions to attend Sun Quan's imperial court as a civilian observer. After he came of age, he was commissioned as a Cavalry Commandant (騎都尉) in the Wu military.

== Service under Sun Quan ==
During the Chiwu era (238–251) of Sun Quan's reign, Chen Biao and Gu Cheng led the tens of thousands of residents in their respective commanderies to Piling County (毗陵縣; present-day Changzhou, Jiangsu) to work on an agricultural project. After Chen Biao died, Sun Quan ordered Zhuge Rong to replace Chen Biao as the Commandant of Xindu Commandery (新都郡; around present-day Yi County, Anhui).

Following Zhuge Jin's death in 241, Zhuge Rong inherited his father's peerage as the Marquis of Wanling (宛陵侯) and took control of the troops stationed at Gong'an County who used to be under his father's command. When Zhuge Rong assumed command at Gong'an County near Wu's western border, the area was rather peaceful. The troops also willingly submitted to his command. While he was at Gong'an County, Zhuge Rong spent his time hunting and training in combat during autumn and winter, and hosting parties during spring and summer. Some of his men even returned to camp to attend his parties when they were on leave. During the party, the guests chatted or played games such as chupu, weiqi, touhu and slingshot, while feasting on fruits, snacks and alcoholic drinks. Zhuge Rong would walk around and mingle with them; he never grew tired of such parties. When Zhuge Rong's father Zhuge Jin and brother Zhuge Ke served in the military, they wore simple and plain clothing with no decorations. Zhuge Rong, in contrast, enjoyed wearing lavishly designed clothes to highlight his "special" status.

In 250, (Note: Shi Ji's biography in the Sanguozhi mentioned that this event took place in the year after Zhu Ran's death in 249.) Wang Chang, a senior general from Wu's rival state Wei, led the Wei forces to attack the Wu-controlled Jiangling County (江陵縣; in present-day Jingzhou, Hubei). When Wang Chang was withdrawing his troops after failing to breach Jiangling County's walls, the Wu general Shi Ji wrote to Zhuge Rong: "(Wang) Chang has come a long way; he and his men are weary and their horses have no more fodder. Heaven is on our side. I don't have enough men to attack them so I hope you can lead your troops to support me. I will attack them from the front while you can mop them up from the rear. The glory won't be only mine; this is an opportunity for us to work together." After Zhuge Rong promised to help him, Shi Ji then led his troops to attack Wang Chang and his men at Jinan (紀南), which was located about 30 li away from Jiangling County. Although Shi Ji initially had the upper hand, he ultimately lost the battle when Zhuge Rong broke his promise and did not show up to help him. After the battle, Sun Quan praised Shi Ji, but severely reprimanded Zhuge Rong and wanted to relieve him of his appointment. However, he eventually pardoned Zhuge Rong as he had to "give face" to Zhuge Rong's brother Zhuge Ke, whom he favoured and heavily relied on. As Shi Ji was initially already not on good terms with Zhuge Ke and Zhuge Rong, this incident further deepened the rift between him and the Zhuge brothers.

== Service under Sun Liang ==
After Sun Quan died in 252, his youngest son Sun Liang succeeded him as the emperor of Wu, with Zhuge Rong's brother Zhuge Ke serving as regent for the young emperor. Zhuge Rong was promoted to General of Vehement Might (奮威將軍). In the spring of 253, when Zhuge Ke was away leading Wu forces to attack the Wei fortress of Xincheng at Hefei, he requested support from Shi Ji's units but did not bring Shi Ji along and instead ordered him to remain at Banzhou (半州). He then granted Zhuge Rong acting imperial authority and ordered him to take command of Shi Ji's units and lead them towards the Mian River to attack Wei reinforcements coming from the west to reinforce Xincheng.

== Death ==
In late 253, Sun Jun, a distant cousin of Sun Quan, overthrew and assassinated Zhuge Ke in a coup d'état. He then ordered Shi Kuan (施寬), Shi Ji, Sun Yi (孫壹) and Quan Xi (全熈) to lead their troops to Gong'an County to arrest Zhuge Rong. When Zhuge Rong heard about it, he started panicking and could not decide what to do. While under siege by Sun Jun's forces, Zhuge Rong eventually took his own life by consuming poison. His three sons, along with Zhuge Ke's extended family, were rounded up and executed.

The Jiang Biao Zhuan recorded that there were sightings of a white alligator in Gong'an County, and that there was a children's rhyme which goes, "The white alligator growls, a turtle carries peace on its back; one can live long in Nan Commandery, but he won't be righteous if he holds on to his life and refuses to die." When Zhuge Rong heard about this, he had a golden seal carved in the image of a turtle, and then committed suicide by swallowing the seal.

== See also ==
- Lists of people of the Three Kingdoms
