= Zhou Tai (Cao Wei) =

Chinese Cao Wei state general (died 261)

- 州泰

General Who Attacks Barbarians (征虜將軍)
- In office ? – 261
- Monarch: Cao Huan

Inspector of Yu Province (豫州刺史)
- In office ?–?
- Monarch: Cao Mao

Inspector of Yan Province (兖州刺史)
- In office ?–?
- Monarch: Cao Mao

Administrator of Xincheng (新城太守)
- In office c. 228–?
- Monarch: Cao Fang

Personal details
- Born: Unknown
- Died: 261
- Occupation: General
- Posthumous name: Marquis Zhuang (壯侯)

Zhou Tai (died 261) was a military general who served in the state of Cao Wei during the Three Kingdoms period of China.

== Life ==
Zhou Tai was from Nanyang Commandery (南陽郡), which is around present-day Nanyang, Henan. He came from the same commandery as Deng Ai and was around the same age as him. He was described as "eager to achieve glory, and well-versed in military tactics".

Early in his career, Zhou Tai served as an Assistant Officer (從事) to Pei Qian (裴潛), the Inspector (刺史) of Jing Province. Sometime between 227 and 230, when the general Sima Yi was stationed at Wan County (宛縣; present-day Wancheng District, Nanyang, Henan) to oversee the military affairs of Jing and Yu provinces, Zhou Tai became acquainted with Sima Yi after frequently helping Sima Yi and Pei Qian deliver messages to each other.

In 227, when Sima Yi led Wei forces to suppress a rebellion by Meng Da in Xincheng Commandery (新城郡; around present-day Fang County, Hubei), he recruited Zhou Tai to serve an officer in his army. Later, when his parents and grandfather died, Zhou Tai had to retire temporarily to perform filial mourning for nine years. Sima Yi valued Zhou Tai so much that he reserved a position for him. After 36 days, Zhou Tai was appointed as the new Administrator (太守) of Xincheng Commandery. Sima Yi secretly instructed a Master of Writing (尚書) (Note: The Shiyu (世語) identified Zhong Yao as the Master of Writing (尚書) who teased Zhou Tai. However, it is unlikely that it was Zhong Yao because Zhong Yao had already been promoted to the highly prestigious office of Grand Tutor (太傅) around 227. Besides, Zhong Yao, as Grand Tutor, was at least on par in terms of prestige with Sima Yi, who was General of Chariots and Cavalry (驃騎將軍) at the time, so it made no sense for Zhong Yao to do as Sima Yi instructed.) to tease Zhou Tai, "You discarded your plain clothing and entered a high office. After only 36 days, you now wield great power and command the armed forces in a commandery. It's like a beggar riding on a (horse-drawn) carriage – that's really fast!" Zhou Tai quipped, "You're right. You come from a famous aristocratic family, and you're already known for your talents since you were young. That's why you're still a Master of Writing. It's like a macaque riding on an ox – that's really slow!" Everyone present was amused.

In the spring of 251, the Wei emperor Cao Fang ordered Wang Ji (Inspector of Jing Province) and Zhou Tai (then Administrator of Xincheng Commandery) to lead forces to attack Wei's rival state, Eastern Wu. They defeated the enemy and forced thousands of enemy troops into surrendering.

Zhou Tai climbed the ranks steadily in the 250s and became the Inspector (刺史) of Yan Province and later the Inspector of Yu Province. In the summer of 257, the Wei general Zhuge Dan started a rebellion in Shouchun (壽春; present-day Shou County, Anhui) with support from Wei's rival state, Eastern Wu. Zhou Tai, then the Inspector of Yan Province, received orders from the Wei regent Sima Zhao to mobilise troops to suppress the rebellion. Sima Zhao sent troops under the command of Zhou Tai, Shi Bao (石苞; General of Uplifting Martial Might (奮武將軍) and overseer of military affairs in Qing Province), Hu Zhi (胡質; Inspector of Xu Province) and others to attack Zhuge Dan and his Wu allies. Zhou Tai defeated Wu forces led by Zhu Yi at Yangyuan (陽淵). As Zhu Yi and his men attempted to retreat, Zhou Tai led his forces in pursuit and killed and wounded over 2,000 enemy troops. In autumn, the Wu general Sun Chen ordered Zhu Yi, Ding Feng, Li Fei (黎斐) and three others to lead troops to relieve the siege on Shouchun. They left their supplies and heavy equipment at Dulu (都陸) and advanced toward Lijiang (黎漿). Shi Bao and Zhou Tai attacked and defeated them. The rebellion was completely suppressed by early 258.

The highest office Zhou Tai ever reached was General Who Attacks Barbarians (征虜將軍). He was also given imperial authority to supervise military affairs in the Jiangnan region. He died in 261 and was posthumously appointed as General of the Guards (衞將軍), and given the posthumous title "Marquis Zhuang" (壯侯).

== See also ==
- Lists of people of the Three Kingdoms
