= Liu Zan =

Chinese Eastern Wu state general (183–255)

- 留贊

Left Protector of the Army (左護軍)
- In office 255 – 255
- Monarch: Sun Liang

General of the Left (左將軍)
- In office 252 – 255
- Monarch: Sun Liang

Colonel of the Garrison Cavalry (屯騎校尉)
- In office ?–?
- Monarch: Sun Quan

Personal details
- Born: 183 Jinhua, Zhejiang
- Died: 255 (aged 72) Anhui
- Children: Liu Lue; Liu Ping
- Occupation: General
- Courtesy name: Zhengming (正明)

Liu Zan (183–255), courtesy name Zhengming, was a military general of the state of Eastern Wu during the Three Kingdoms period of China. He previously served under the warlord Sun Quan (later the founding emperor of Wu) in the late Eastern Han dynasty. A brave commander, he would be crippled with a leg injury for some time before taking drastic measures to heal himself. Liu Zan would, while ill, die in battle and his family would continue to serve the dynasty until their destruction in 272.

== Early life and service under Sun Quan ==
Liu Zan was from Changshan County (長山縣), Kuaiji Commandery (會稽郡), which is in present-day Jinhua, Zhejiang. He served as a minor official in the local commandery office in his youth and once fought with Wu Huan (吳桓), a Yellow Turban rebel leader. Although he killed Wu Huan, he was injured in one leg and could no longer straighten it.

Despite his injury, Liu Zan remained headstrong and unyielding. He was particularly fond of reading military and history books. Whenever he read about how military commanders in ancient times deployed their troops in battle, he would sigh because he thought that he could never be like them. He once told his family and friends, "The Tianxia is in a state of chaos, with so many people fighting for power. Throughout history, only extraordinary people will succeed in becoming rich and famous. Now that I can't do anything with this crippling injury, I am no different from being dead. I intend to cut my leg. If I am lucky enough to survive and be able to straighten my leg, then I'll be able to pursue my dreams. If I die, then so be it." His family and friends tried to stop him but to no avail. He cut himself in the leg and let blood flow freely, but became unconscious because of the pain. After he recovered, he could straighten his leg and walk normally again.

Ling Tong, a military officer serving under the warlord Sun Quan, heard about Liu Zan and so impressed that he recommended Liu Zan as a talent to his lord. Liu Zan thus came to serve Sun Quan. After fighting for Sun Quan in some battles, he was promoted to a Colonel of the Garrison Cavalry (屯騎校尉). As Liu Zan was known for being very outspoken, candid and fearless of authority, Sun Quan found him rather intimidating.

== Battle of Dongxing ==
In 252, after Sun Quan's death, Liu Zan continued serving under the child ruler Sun Liang, Sun Quan's successor and the second emperor of Eastern Wu. Later that year, Wu's rival state, Wei, launched an invasion and attacked a dam constructed at Dongxing (東興; in present-day Chaohu, Anhui) where Liu Zan's son Liu Lue as Commandant was helping guard the city. The Wu regent Zhuge Ke led Wu forces to resist the invaders, with Liu Zan, Ding Feng, Lü Ju and Tang Zi leading the vanguard force. They seized control of Xu embankment (徐塘) and destroyed one of the enemy's forward camps. The main Wu army followed suit and together they defeated the Wei forces. Liu Zan was promoted to General of the Left (左將軍) for his contributions in the battle.

== Guanqiu Jian and Wen Qin's Rebellion ==
In 255, when the Wei generals Guanqiu Jian and Wen Qin started a rebellion in Shouchun (壽春; present-day Shou County, Anhui), the Wu regent Sun Jun, who had overthrown Zhuge Ke, decided to lead troops to Shouchun to support the rebels. Liu Zan was commissioned as Left Protector of the Army (左護軍), given a seal of authority, and ordered to join Sun Jun in the campaign. However, he fell sick on the journey to Shouchun. At the same time, Wei imperial forces had managed to suppress the rebellion already. While preparing to return to Wu, Sun Jun ordered Liu Zan and the troops escorting the supplies to head back first.

Taking advantage of the enemy's retreat, the Wei general Zhuge Dan ordered his subordinate Jiang Ban (蔣班) to lead 4,000 troops to pursue and attack Liu Zan. As Liu Zan was ill at the time, he could not get up and direct the troops to fight the enemy. Knowing that they would lose the battle, he passed his ceremonial umbrella and his official seal to his subordinate(s) and told him, "As a commander, I have defeated enemies and captured their flags, but I have never lost a single battle. Now, I am sick and outnumbered by the enemy. You should quickly leave while you still can. It won't do our State any good if all of us die here today; it'll only benefit the enemy." When his subordinate(s) refused to leave, Liu drew his sword and threatened to kill him; only then did his subordinate(s) leave.

In the past, when Liu Zan went to battle, he always assembled his troops first and made them sing and roar to boost their morale. He never lost any of the battles he fought in, until his last one. Before his death, he sighed, "I have always fought battles in the same way. Today, because of my illness, I end up in this situation. Such is my destiny!" He was 73 years old at the time of his death (by East Asian age reckoning). Jiang Ban ordered his head to be cut off and put on display, and confiscated his military seal. Many people lamented his death.

== Family and legacy ==
Liu Zan had two sons: Liu Lue (留略) and Liu Ping (留平), who both served as military generals in Eastern Wu. Liu Lue would be appointed Administrator of Donghai soon after Liu Zan's death. In 263 when Wei forces attacked Wu's ally Shu-Han, Liu Ping was sent by Emperor Sun Xiu, Liang's elder brother and successor, to coordinate the military response with Shi Ji. After news of Shu Han's surrender, Liu Ping as General who Conquers the West, took part in Lu Kang's failed attack at Badong against Luo Xian. On Sun Xiu's death, he was replaced by Sun Hao whose reign would be known for its brutality. The Wushu claims that in 266, Liu Ping overheard a plot to replace Sun Hao and refused to take part but didn't reveal the plot either, though the historian Sima Guang dismisses the tale as Liu Ping being too mediocre to keep it a secret. However, in 272, Liu Ping was forced to take his own life, the details of which were recorded by Yu Pu in Jiangbiao zhuan shortly after the civil war. When Sun Hao marched against the Jin dynasty, which had overthrown the Wei dynasty, in 271, the army became stuck in the snow and there were many complaints. During the campaign, Liu Ping had discussed with Ding Feng and senior minister Wan Yu about defecting to Jin with their troops rather than staying with Sun Hao; Sun Hao heard of this but felt unable to do anything about at the time. In 272, the Emperor struck against the dissidents, poisoning the wine given to Wan Yu and Liu Ping. The latter realized his drink was poisoned and took poison to purge it from his system, vomiting the harmful material out but realizing his fate was sealed, Liu Ping took his own life.

Liu Zan's biography is not in the main text of Chen Shou's Sanguozhi but comes from the Wu Shu, the official state history of the Wu dynasty, with his entry added to Sun Jun's biography in the Sanguozhi by Pei Songzhi. Yuan Dynasty scholar Hao Jing praised Liu Zan for his military prowess and gave him the title of "Wan Ren Di" (萬人敵, lit. 'Rivaling ten thousand men'), a title which he shared with Guan Yu, another famous warrior of Three Kingdoms era. Liu Zan appears only once in the 14th century novel Romance of the Three Kingdoms, under Zhuge Ke at Dongxing.

== See also ==
- Lists of people of the Three Kingdoms
