= Battle of Ruxukou =

Battle of Ruxukou or Battle of Ruxu may refer to:

- Battle of Ruxu (213), fought in 213 between the warlords Cao Cao and Sun Quan
- Battle of Ruxu (217), fought in 217 between the warlords Cao Cao and Sun Quan
- Battle of Ruxu (222–223), fought in 222–223 between the states of Cao Wei and Eastern Wu
