= Battle of Dongxing =

Battle between the states of Cao Wei and Eastern Wu (253)

- Part of the wars of the Three Kingdoms period
Date	January – February 253
Location	Dongxing (東興; southeast of present-day Chaohu City, Anhui)
Result	Wu tactical victory

Belligerents
Cao Wei	Eastern Wu

Commanders and leaders
Sima Zhao; Zhuge Dan; Guanqiu Jian; Wang Chang	Zhuge Ke; Ding Feng; Liu Zan

Strength
70,000	40,000

Battle of Dongxing
- Traditional Chinese: 東興之戰
- Simplified Chinese: 东兴之战
Transcriptions
Standard Mandarin
- Hanyu Pinyin: Dōngxīng zhī zhàn

Battle of Dongguan
- Traditional Chinese: 東關之役
- Simplified Chinese: 东关之役
Transcriptions
Standard Mandarin
- Hanyu Pinyin: Dōngguān zhī yì

The Battle of Dongxing, also known as the Battle of Dongguan, was fought from January to February 253 between the states of Cao Wei and Eastern Wu during the Three Kingdoms period of China. The battle concluded with a tactical victory for Wu.

== Background ==
As early as 211, Sun Quan, the founding emperor of Wu, had already ordered the construction of defensive structures at Ruxu (濡須; north of Wuwei County, Anhui) for defensive preparations against possible attacks from a rival warlord, Cao Cao. In 230, Sun Quan had a dam built at Dongxing to contain the nearby Lake Chao. Sun Quan died in 252 and was succeeded by his son Sun Liang as the emperor of Wu. In November or December 252, the Wu regent Zhuge Ke started construction works at the Dongxing dam, increasing its length such that it joined the hills at either side of the dam, and two castles were built in the middle. Zhuge Ke stationed 1,000 troops in each castle and put Quan Duan (全端) and Liu Lue (留略) in charge of them, while he led the rest of the men back.

== Prelude ==
Wei felt humiliated when Wu began infringing on its territory by doing construction works on the Dongxing dam. The Wei general Zhuge Dan proposed to the regent Sima Shi a plan to counter Wu, and Sima Shi accepted his idea. In December 252 or January 253, the Wei imperial court commissioned Wang Chang, Guanqiu Jian, Zhuge Dan and Hu Zun (胡遵) to attack Wu from three directions: Wang Chang would attack Jiangling; Guanqiu Jian would attack Wuchang (武昌; present-day Ezhou, Hubei); Zhuge Dan and Hu Zun would lead 70,000 troops to Dongxing to attack the two castles and damage the dam.

When news of the Wei attack reached Wu, Zhuge Ke led 40,000 troops to resist the enemy. Hu Zun ordered his men to build pontoon bridges to get to the dam and divided them into two groups to attack the two castles. However the castles were situated on high ground and difficult to access.

The Wu generals said, "When the enemy learns that the Grand Tutor (Zhuge Ke) is coming here personally, they will surely retreat when we reach the shore." However, only Ding Feng had a different view. He said: "No. They are making large movements in their territory. They are prepared, as they have mobilised large numbers of troops from Xu and Luo, so why would they go back empty-handed? Don't think that the enemy won't come. We should ready ourselves for battle." When Zhuge Ke reached Dongxing, he placed Ding Feng, Liu Zan, Lü Ju and Tang Zi in command of the vanguard and they moved west along mountainous terrain. Ding Feng warned: "We are moving too slow. If the enemy seizes favourable ground, it will be harder to deal with them." He then led 3,000 soldiers with him, travelling on a different route from the main bulk of Wu forces.

== The battle ==
Strong north winds were blowing at that time. Ding Feng and his 3,000 men reached the frontline within two days and seized control of Xu embankment (徐塘). It was winter and there was snowfall. The Wei officers were off guard and having a drinking session, so, despite the feeble size of his army, Ding Feng rallied his men: "Today is the day we claim titles and rewards!" He then ordered his troops to remove their armour and helmets, discard their jis and spears, and arm themselves with only shields and short weapons such as swords. The Wei soldiers laughed when they saw this event, and instead refused to ready themselves for combat. Ding Feng and his men fought bravely and destroyed the enemy camp at the front. Just then, another Wu force led by Lü Ju and others arrived and joined Ding Feng in attacking the enemy camp. The Wei forces were shocked by the sudden fierce assault and were thrown into chaos. Many Wei soldiers scrambled to cross the pontoon bridges but the bridges collapsed. They fell into the water and started trampling on each other while desperately trying to get onto land. Huan Jia, a Wei Commandery administrator, was killed in action. Han Zong, a Wu general who defected to Wei and led the Wei vanguard in this battle, also lost his life in battle. Zhuge Ke decapitated Han Zong's body and sent the head to Sun Quan's temple as a propitiation.

== Aftermath ==
When Wang Chang and Guanqiu Jian heard of the Wei defeat at Dongxing, they burnt their camps and withdrew as well. Back in the Wei imperial court, many officials argued for the Wei commanders to be either demoted or dismissed for their failure in the invasion. However Sima Shi said: "I did not listen to Gongxiu (Zhuge Dan) and that resulted in this situation. It's my fault. What have the generals done wrong?" Sima Shi's younger brother Sima Zhao, who was supervising the campaign, was stripped of his title of nobility.

On the other hand, Wu forces captured large quantities of equipment and livestock left behind by Wei forces and marched back in triumph. Zhuge Ke received the title of Marquis of Yangdu (陽都侯) and was appointed Governor (牧) of Jing and Yang provinces, as well as 1,000 jin of gold, 200 fine horses and 10,000 rolls each of silk and cloth. Ding Feng was promoted to General Who Eliminates Bandits (滅寇將軍) and enfeoffed as a Marquis of a Chief Village (都亭侯).

== Order of battle ==
=== Cao Wei forces ===
- General Who Stabilises the East (安東將軍) Sima Zhao supervised the campaign.
- Senior General Who Attacks the South (征南大將軍) Wang Chang attacked Jiangling.
- General Who Guards the South (鎮南將軍) Guanqiu Jian attacked Wuchang (武昌; present-day Ezhou, Hubei).
- General Who Attacks the East (征東將軍) Hu Zun (胡遵) led 70,000 troops to attack Dongxing.
  - General Who Guards the East (鎮東將軍) Zhuge Dan
  - † Administrator of Yue'an (樂安太守) Huan Jia
  - † Han Zong was the vanguard.

=== Eastern Wu forces ===
- Grand Tutor (太傅) Zhuge Ke led 40,000 troops to Dongxing to resist the Wei army.
  - Champion General (冠軍將軍) Ding Feng led 3,000 troops to attack the Wei camp.
  - General of the Right (右將軍) Lü Ju
  - Colonel of the Garrison Cavalry (屯騎校尉) Liu Zan
  - Tang Zi

== In popular culture ==
The battle is featured as a playable stage in the seventh installment of Koei's video game series Dynasty Warriors. The battle consists of two halves in Dynasty Warriors 7. The first half is played from Zhuge Dan's point of view and the second features Wang Yuanji saving Zhuge Dan after crossing a bridge and being ambushed by Ding Feng. The game also states that Zhuge Dan successfully captured the two strongholds at Dongxing. In the Xtreme Legends expansion, the battle is playable from Ding Feng's point of view. His aim is to ambush Wei forces from the mountain.
