= Empress Zhu (Eastern Wu) =

Empress of Eastern Wu (died 265)

Empress Zhu 朱皇后

Empress dowager of Eastern Wu
- Tenure: 3 September 264 – October 264
- Successor: Empress Dowager He

Empress consort of Eastern Wu
- Tenure: 16 September 262 – 3 September 264
- Predecessor: Empress Quan
- Successor: Empress Teng
- Born: Unknown (Note: As her parents married in 229, Lady Zhu should be born in or after 229.); Suzhou, Jiangsu
- Died: July or August 265 (Note: Sun Hao's biography in the Sanguozhi recorded that he forced Empress Jing to commit suicide in the 7th month of the 1st year of the Gan'lu era of his reign. This month corresponds to 30 July to 28 August 265 in the Gregorian calendar.); Nanjing, Jiangsu
- Spouse: Sun Xiu
Posthumous name
- Empress Jing (景皇后)
- Father: Zhu Ju
- Mother: Sun Luyu

Empress Zhu (died July or August 265), formally known as Empress Jing, was an empress of the state of Eastern Wu during the Three Kingdoms period of China. Her husband was Sun Xiu (Emperor Jing), the third emperor of Wu.

== Life ==
Lady Zhu was the daughter of Zhu Ju and Sun Luyu, a daughter of Wu's founding emperor Sun Quan. Even though this made her Sun Xiu's niece, Sun Quan married her to Sun Xiu around 250. In 250, she lost her father, as Zhu Ju, after unsuccessfully trying to persuade Sun Quan not to depose the crown prince Sun He, was exiled to Xindu (新都; in present-day Hangzhou, Zhejiang) and was executed on the way there. After Sun Xiu was created the "Prince of Langye" in 252, she became his princess consort. She accompanied him, as his princedom was initially established at Hulin (虎林; in present-day Chizhou, Anhui) but subsequently moved twice to Danyang (丹陽; in present-day Xuancheng, Anhui) then finally to Kuaiji (會稽; in present-day Shaoxing, Zhejiang).

In 255, Lady Zhu would lose her mother as well. At the instigation of her aunt Sun Luban, the regent Sun Jun believed that Sun Luyu was part of a plot to assassinate him, and so had Sun Luyu executed. Sun Xiu became fearful, and sent Lady Zhu back to the capital Jianye (建業; present-day Nanjing, Jiangsu), effectively offering to divorce her, but Sun Jun declined by sending Lady Zhu back to Sun Xiu.

In 258, the emperor Sun Liang (Sun Xiu's younger half-brother), after a failed attempt to remove Sun Jun's cousin and successor Sun Chen, was himself removed from the throne by Sun Chen. Sun Chen installed Sun Xiu on the throne. However, Sun Xiu, despite urging from officials, did not immediately instate Lady Zhu as the empress. Rather, he waited until 262 to do so. He also created his son Sun Wan crown prince, although it is not clear whether Sun Wan was her son or not. (Note: It is not clear whether she bore any of Sun Xiu's four sons.)

In 264, Sun Xiu died after entrusting Sun Wan to the chancellor Puyang Xing (濮陽興). Empress Zhu became the empress dowager. Puyang Xing and the other key official in charge, Zhang Bu, in the light of the destruction of Wu's ally state Shu Han in 263, decided that the people were yearning for an older emperor. (Note: It is not known how old Sun Wan was at this point, but Sun Xiu himself died at age 29, so it was unlikely that Sun Wan was even a teenager.) At the recommendation of the general Wan Yu, who was friendly with Sun Hao (son of the former crown prince Sun He), Puyang Xing and Zhang Bu wanted to declare Sun Hao emperor instead. When they reported this to Empress Dowager Zhu, she said: "I am just a widow. What do I know about the important affairs of state? As long as the empire is not harmed, and the emperors continue to be properly worshipped, I am satisfied."

Puyang Xing and Zhang Bu then installed Sun Hao on the throne. However, it soon became clear that Sun Hao was the wrong choice, as he quickly demonstrated his cruel and superstitious tendencies. Puyang Xing and Zhang Bu would indeed become his first victims, as their regret in selecting Sun Hao was quickly reported to him, who had them arrested and executed. Later that year, he would also demote Empress Dowager Zhu to the position of "Empress Jing" (Note: "Jing" was a reference to Sun Xiu's posthumous title "Emperor Jing"), making his own mother, Consort He, empress dowager instead. In 265, Sun Hao forced Empress Dowager Zhu to commit suicide and killed Sun Xiu's two eldest sons – the former crown prince Sun Wan and Sun Gong (the Prince of Runan). Empress Dowager Zhu was given a substandard funeral (for an empress), although she was buried with honours befitting an empress alongside Sun Xiu.

== See also ==
- Eastern Wu family trees#Sun Xiu
- Lists of people of the Three Kingdoms

== Notes ==
Chinese royalty
Preceded by Empress Quan	Empress of Eastern Wu; 262–264	Succeeded by Empress Teng
