= Zhang Te =

Mid-3rd century Cao Wei military general

- 張特

Administrator of Anfeng (安豐太守)
- In office ?–?
- Monarch: Cao Fang / Cao Mao

General of a Miscellaneous Title (雜號將軍)
- In office ?–?
- Monarch: Cao Fang / Cao Mao

Officer of the Standard (牙門將)
- In office ?–?
- Monarch: Cao Fang

Personal details
- Born: Unknown Zhuozhou, Hebei
- Died: Unknown
- Occupation: General
- Courtesy name: Zichan (子產)

Zhang Te (fl. 251–253), courtesy name Zichan, was a military general of the state of Cao Wei during the Three Kingdoms period of China. He is best known for resisting an invasion by Wei's rival state, Eastern Wu, at the Battle of Hefei in 253.

== Life ==
Zhang Te was from Zhuo Commandery (涿郡), which is around present-day Zhuozhou, Hebei. He started his career as an Officer of the Standard (牙門將) under the Wei general Zhuge Dan, who held the appointment of General Who Guards the East (鎮東將軍) from 251 to 252. After Guanqiu Jian took over the position of General Who Guards the East from Zhuge Dan, he put Zhang Te in charge of guarding Xincheng (新城; literally "new city"), a fortress at Hefei.

In 253, Zhuge Ke, the regent of Wei's rival state Eastern Wu, led Wu forces to attack Xincheng and surrounded the fortress. Zhang Te, along with Yue Fang (樂方) and others, led 3,000 troops to defend Xincheng. During this time, he sent his subordinates Liu Zheng (劉整) and Zheng Xiang (鄭像) to break out of the siege and seek reinforcements, but Zhuge Ke's men intercepted and captured them. In desperation, Zhang Te lied to the enemy: "I've no intention of fighting now. However, according to the laws of Wei, when I'm under attack for more than 100 days and reinforcements do not arrive, even if I surrender, my family will be spared from punishment. Since I first started resisting the enemy, it has been more than 90 days. This city originally had a population of more than 4,000, and now more than half of them have died in battle. Even when the city falls, if someone does not wish to surrender, I'll speak to him and explain the possible implications of his choice. Tomorrow morning I'll send a list of names, you can first take my tally as a token of trust." Although Zhuge Ke did not accept Zhang Te's tally, he believed that Zhang Te wanted to surrender so he ordered his troops to stop attacking. Zhang Te and his remaining troops then seized the opportunity to make repairs to the walls and strengthen their defences overnight. The following morning, Zhang Te told the enemy: "We shall fight to the death!" Zhuge Ke turned furious when he realised he had been fooled, so he ordered his troops to mount a fierce assault on the fortress. However, his troops were already exhausted and weary after several days of siege, and they failed to breach Xincheng's walls. When Zhuge Ke sensed that his army's morale was falling, he had no choice but to withdraw back to Wu.

The Wei imperial court lauded Zhang Te for his valiant defence of Xincheng and appointed him as a General of a Miscellaneous Title (雜號將軍) (Note: In the Eastern Han dynasty and Three Kingdoms period, there were two categories of general ranks: Generals of Important Titles (重號將軍) and Generals of Miscellaneous Titles (雜號將軍). The former category includes generals with specific appointments such as General-in-Chief (大將軍), General of Agile Cavalry (驃騎將軍), General Who Guards the East (鎮東將軍) and General of the Vanguard (前將軍). The latter category includes generals with no specific appointments such as Lieutenant-General (偏將軍), Major-General (裨將軍), General Who Defeats Barbarians (破虜將軍) and General Who Attacks Rebels (討逆將軍). Zhang Te's appointment belonged to the latter category.) He was later reassigned to be the Administrator (太守) of Anfeng Commandery (安豐郡; around present-day Lu'an, Anhui).

== See also ==
- Lists of people of the Three Kingdoms
