= Zhuge Qiao =

Chinese Shu Han state official (204-228)

- 諸葛喬

Chief Commandant of Escorting Cavalry (駙馬都尉)

Personal details
- Born: c. 204 (Note: The Sanguozhi stated that Zhuge Qiao died at the age of 25 (by East Asian age reckoning) in the 1st year of the Jianxing era (223-237) in Liu Shan's reign. However, some scholars argued that Zhuge Qiao accompanied Zhuge Liang in an army at Han Zhong in 227, and citing the biographies of other personalities in Sanguozhi (such as Liu Shan, Zhuge Liang, Xiang Lang and Huo Jun), made the case that there was a mistake in Qiao's biography. In Qing-era scholar He Zhuo's opinion, he thought that the character “元 (first)” should be “六 (six)” instead, and defined Qiao's death year to be the 6th year of the Jianxing era. By calculation, Zhuge Qiao's birth year should be around 204.)
- Died: 228 (aged 24)
- Children: Zhuge Pan
- Parent: Zhuge Jin (father)
- Relatives: Zhuge Ke (brother); Zhuge Rong (brother); Zhang Cheng's wife (sister); Zhuge Liang (uncle)
- Occupation: Official
- Courtesy name: Zhongshen (仲慎); Bosong (伯松)

Zhuge Qiao (c. 204–228), courtesy name Bosong, was an official of the state of Shu Han in the Three Kingdoms period of China. He was the adopted son of Zhuge Liang, the Imperial Chancellor and regent of Shu from 223 to 234. His biological father was Zhuge Liang's elder brother Zhuge Jin, a military general of Shu's ally state, Eastern Wu.

== Life ==
Zhuge Qiao and his elder brother Zhuge Ke were very famous in Eastern Wu but many people felt that Zhuge Qiao was not as talented as his brother, but his character and conducts were better than his brother's.

Zhuge Liang did not have any sons initially so he requested to adopt Zhuge Qiao as his heir. Zhuge Jin sent Zhuge Qiao to Shu after seeking permission from the Wu emperor Sun Quan. Zhuge Qiao became Zhuge Liang's adopted son. Zhuge Liang changed Zhuge Qiao's original courtesy name "Zhongshen" to "Bosong". Zhuge Qiao was appointed as a Chief Commandant of Escorting Cavalry (駙馬都尉), and he followed Zhuge Liang to Hanzhong Commandery. Zhuge Liang once wrote a letter to Zhuge Jin, "(Zhuge) Qiao should have returned to Chengdu (the Shu capital). However, I see that the sons of the other Shu generals have inherited their fathers' legacies, so I thought we should share honour and shame together with them. I have put (Zhuge) Qiao in command of 500-600 soldiers and deployed him to the valley together with the sons of the other generals."

Zhuge Qiao died in 228 at the age of 25 (by East Asian age reckoning). Zhuge Qiao's son, Zhuge Pan (諸葛攀), served in Shu as well and his highest appointment was Protector of the Army and Soaring Martial General (行護軍翊武將軍), but he also died at a young age. After Zhuge Ke and his family were massacred in Wu in a coup d'état in 253, Zhuge Pan reverted to his original lineage and travelled to Wu to continue his biological grandfather's bloodline there.

== See also ==
- Lists of people of the Three Kingdoms

== Bibliography ==
- Chen, Shou (3rd century). Records of the Three Kingdoms (Sanguozhi).
- Pei, Songzhi (5th century). Annotated Records of the Three Kingdoms (Sanguozhi zhu).
