= Wang clan of Taiyuan =

Notable Chinese family

Wang 王
- Clan
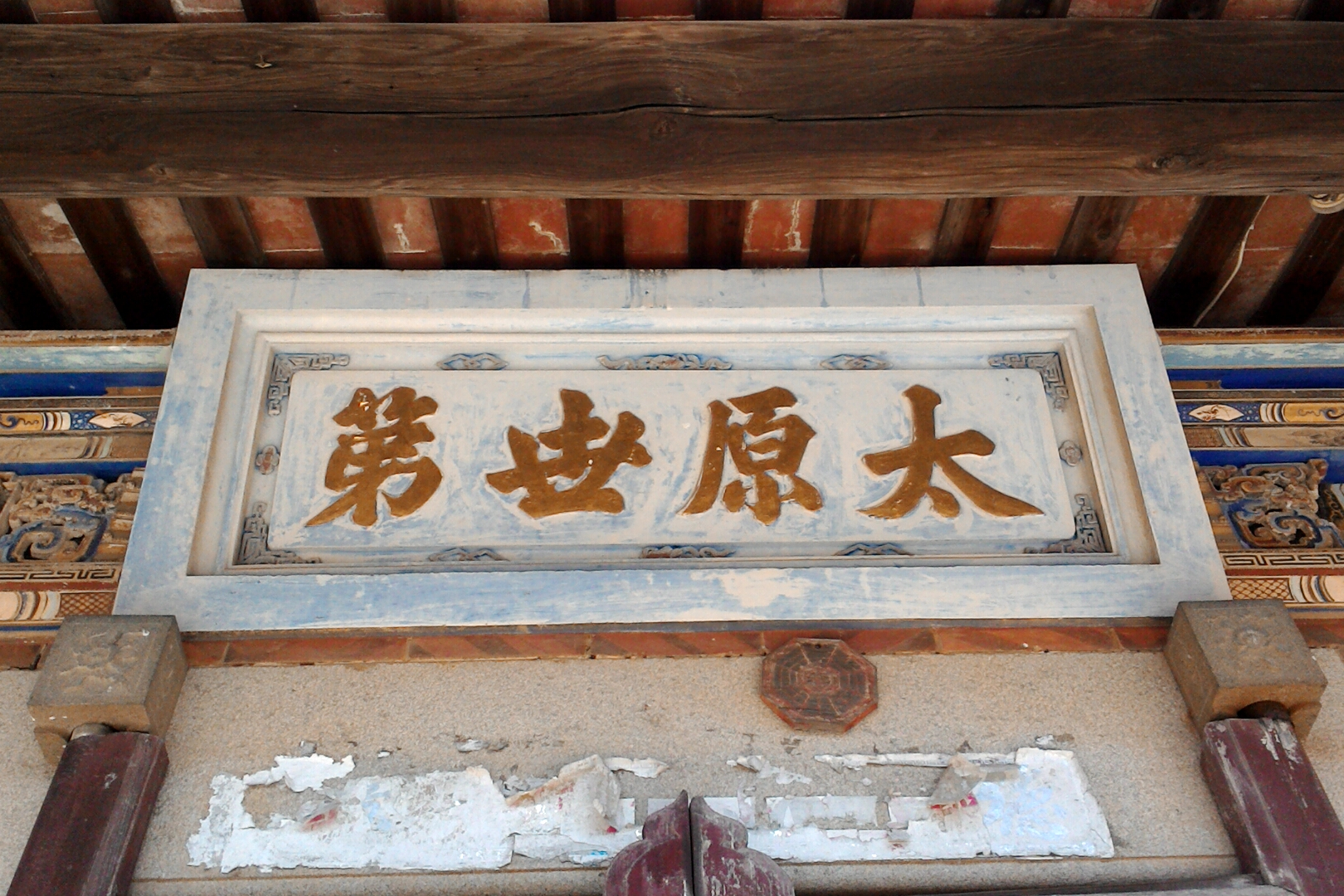
- "Taiyuan Shidi" plaque in the settlement behind the mountain, Sanshanli, Jinsha Town, Kinmen County, Fujian Province
- Founder: Wang Wei (a grandson of Wang Ben)
- Connected families: Wang clan of Langya

The Wang clan of Taiyuan (Chinese: 太原王氏; pinyin: Tàiyuán Wáng shì; Wade–Giles: T'ai^{¹} Yuan^{²} Wang^{²} Shi^{⁴}) was a Chinese clan which achieved prominence between the Han and Tang dynasties, based in Taiyuan in modern-day Shanxi province.

The earliest prominent members of this clan can be traced back to two brothers, Wang Rou and Wang Ze, of the Eastern Han dynasty.

== History ==
=== Origins ===
According to the New Book of Tang, the Wang clan of Taiyuan was founded by Wang Ba (王霸), a ninth-generation descendant of Wang Wei (王威), who was the second son of Wang Li (王離) and the grandson of Wang Ben.

Wang Yuan (王元), the older brother of Wang Wei, was the ancestor of Wang clan of Langya.

=== Northern and Southern dynasties ===
The Wang clan generally did not move southwards after the Disaster of Yongjia and the fall of the Western Jin.

During the Northern Wei period, the Wang clan was considered one of the 'four surnames' – four powerful clans, alongside the Lu clan of Fanyang, the Cui clan of Qinghe and the Zheng clan of Xingyang.

== Prominent members ==
- Wang Yun (王允; 137-192), Eastern Han official
- Wang Ling (王淩; 172-251), nephew of Wang Yun, Cao Wei official
- Wang Chang (王昶; d. 259), Cao Wei official and commander
- Wang Hun (王渾; 223–297), son of Wang Chang, Cao Wei and Jin minister
- Wang Chen (王沈; d. 266), son of Wang Chang's 1st cousin, Cao Wei and Jin minister and historian
- Wang Jun (王浚; 252–314), son of Wang Chen, Jin commander and warlord
- Wang Tanzhi (王坦之; 330–375), great-grandson of Wang Zhan (王湛), a younger brother of Wang Hun; Eastern Jin minister.
- Empress Wang, Empress of China from 650 to 655, first wife of Emperor Gaozong
- Wang Pu (王溥; d. 905), Tang dynasty chancellor

== See also ==
- Wang clan of Langya, another prominent clan surnamed Wang
