= Wang Hun (general) =

Chinese general and official (223–297)

- 王渾
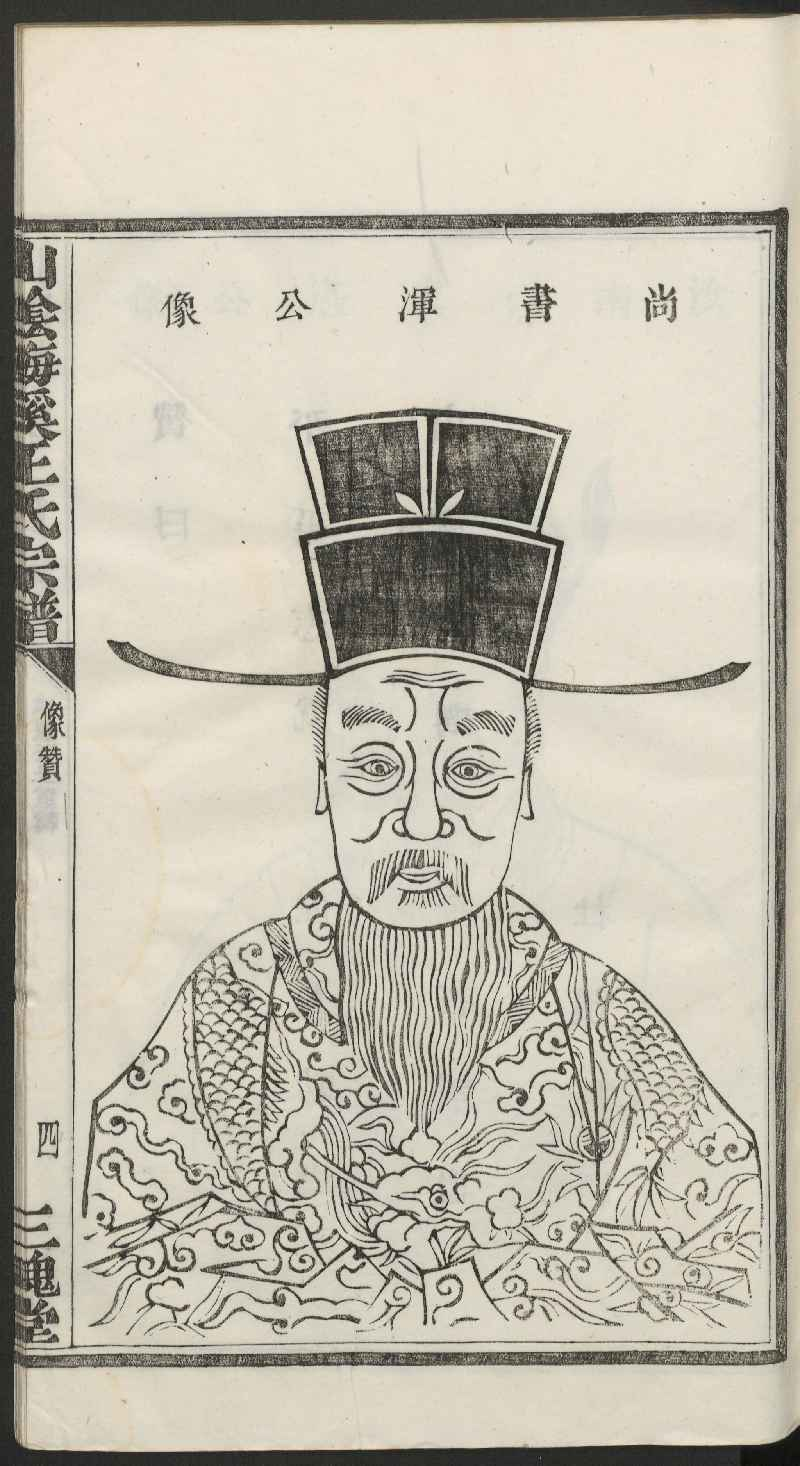
- Illustration from the Genealogy of the Wang Family of Meixi, 1853

General Who Stabilizes the East (安東將軍)
- In office ?–?
- Monarch: Emperor Wu of Jin

Supervisor of the Left of the Masters of Writing (尚書左僕射)
- In office 285 – 297
- Monarchs: Emperor Wu of Jin/ Emperor Hui of Jin

Minister Over the Masses (司徒)
- In office 290 – 297
- Monarchs: Emperor Wu of Jin/ Emperor Hui of Jin

Manager of the Affairs of the Masters of Writing (錄尚書事)
- In office 291 – ?
- Monarch: Emperor Hui of Jin

Personal details
- Born: 223 Taiyuan, Shanxi
- Died: 4 September 297 (aged 74)
- Spouse: Zhong Yan (Note: Lady Zhong has a biography in vol.96 of Jin Shu; this biography recorded that "Yan" (琰) was her courtesy name and that she was Zhong Yao's great-granddaughter. Vol.517 of Taiping Yulan, citing another Jin Shu, recorded that "Yan" was Lady Zhong's name and that she was Yao's granddaughter; a Wang Shi Pu annotation in vol.19 of Shishuo Xinyu recorded that her name was "Yanzhi" and that she was Yao's granddaughter (〈王氏谱曰：“锺夫人名琰之，太傅繇之孙。”〉).)
- Relations: see Wang clan of Taiyuan
- Children: Wang Shang; Wang Ji; Wang Cheng; Wang Wen; Pei Kai's wife; He Qiao's wife; Wei Heng's wife (and mother of Wei Jie); two unnamed daughters
- Parent: Wang Chang (father)
- Occupation: General and politician
- Courtesy name: Xuanchong (玄沖)
- Posthumous name: Duke Yuan of Jingling (京陵元公)
- Peerage: Marquis of Jingling (京陵侯); Duke of Jingling (京陵公)

Wang Hun (Note: not to be confused with the father of Wang Rong, who has the same name, but whose courtesy name is "Changyuan".) (223 – 4 September 297), courtesy name Xuanchong, was a Chinese military general and politician of Cao Wei during the Three Kingdoms period and Western Jin dynasty period. He spent most of his early career serving at the eastern borders of Jin and Eastern Wu, where he occasionally battled with the southern state. He was most known for his role in the Conquest of Wu between 279 and 280, during which he destroyed Wu's main forces under Zhang Ti, as well as his subsequent dispute with Wang Jun, who he accused of going against orders by capturing Jianye on his own and stealing Wang Hun's chance at glory. Despite the controversy surrounding him following the conquest, he remained an accomplished and well-respected figure within the state.

== Early life and career ==
=== Early career in Cao Wei ===
Wang Hun was born in 223 during the reign of Cao Pi as the son of the Cao Wei general Wang Chang, who was from the Wang clan of Jinyang County (晉陽; present-day Taiyuan, Shanxi) in Taiyuan Commandery. Wang Hun began his career as a subordinate of the General-In-Chief, Cao Shuang. In 249, during Cao Fang's reign, Sima Yi carried out a coup at Gaoping Tombs, executing Cao Shuang and many of his partisans. However, Wang Hun was merely dismissed from his office, and he would later return to the government shortly after, serving a series of offices including as military advisor of Sima Zhao. In 259, during Cao Mao's reign, after his father's death, Wang Hun inherited the peerage of Marquis of Jingling.

=== Service in Xuzhou, Yuzhou and Yangzhou ===
After Wei was dissolved and Jin was formed in 266, Wang Hun was appointed General Who Spreads Vehemence and the Inspector of Xuzhou. During his time in Xuzhou, a famine had broken out. In response, Wang Hun opened up the granaries and warehouses to feed the people, causing the local populace to highly revere him. Later, he was tasked in defending Xuchang and oversaw military affairs in Huaibei.

Wang Hun was eventually transferred to Yuzhou, where he was given military command over the province and was acting Inspector. As Yuzhou was bordered with Jin's southern rival state, Eastern Wu, Wang Hun began publicizing his state's prestige, attracting many migrants from Wu. At the time, two Wu generals, Xue Ying and Lu Shu, were boasted to have a total of 100,000 soldiers under their wing. In 273, the pair attacked Jin at Yiyang and Xinxi (新息; southwest of present-day Xi County, Henan) during a day when most of the Jin soldiers were on leave and only one brigade was defending the areas. Despite that, Wang Hun took what little he had and led them to secretly cross the Huaihe. Xue Ying and Lu Shu did not anticipate the Jin army to attack, so Wang Hun routed them.

Wang Hun was later once again transferred, this time to Yangzhou, where he served as General Who Stabilizes the East as well as Chief Controller of Yangzhou and defended the city of Shouchun. Wu had been heavily cultivating in Wancheng (宛城; in present-day Nanyang, Henan) in preparation to attack. Wang Hun ordered the Inspector of Yangzhou, Ying Chou (應綽), to raid Wancheng's farmlands. Ying Chou destroyed the local garrison in Wancheng and burnt much of Wu's grains, rice seedlings and ships before returning. Afterwards, Wang Hun positioned troops at the eastern border, observing the terrains and enemy cities for Jin's future plans of invasion.

=== Friendship with Liu Yuan ===
Wang Hun was friends with a Xiongnu noble named Liu Yuan, who would later be known as the founder of Han-Zhao, one of the pivotal states of the Sixteen Kingdoms. At this point, Liu Yuan was still a Jin official, and Wang Hun, along with his son Wang Ji (王濟), would often talk on behalf of him to Sima Yan. Liu Yuan was liked by Sima Yan but not by Sima Yan's advisors. In 279, he was recommended twice to be given command over an army, – first against Wu and then against the Xianbei rebel Tufa Shujineng – but Sima Yan was advised not to in both times.

Liu Yuan became depressed at what he perceived as a mistreatment of him, and this change of behaviour was noticed by Sima Yan's brother, Sima You. Fearing that he would rebel, Sima You told his brother that Liu Yuan should be removed at once. However, Wang Hun intervened and argued that executing someone the emperor had no suspicion with would be both unfair and not a good look for the state. Sima Yan sided with Wang Hun over the matter, so Liu Yuan was spared.

== Conquest of Wu ==
In December 279, Sima Yan launched a grand invasion of Wu to unify China once and for all. Prior to the conquest, Wang Hun sent a petition cautioning that Sun Hao was planning to attack north. The court believed that Sun Hao had no such plan, but did take steps in strengthening the defences to make the conquest easier. Once the conquest began, the Jin generals were divided and marched to different locations, with Wang Hun being Hengjiang (橫江; southeast of present-day He County, Anhui).

Along the way, Wang Hun captured Xunyang (尋陽; southwest of present-day Huangmei County, Hubei), Gaowang (高望; southwest of present-day Pu County 浦縣), and Laixiang (賴鄉) as well as the Wu general Zhou Xing (周興). He also received the surrenders of Chen Dai (陳代) and Zhu Ming (朱明). Hearing of Wang Hun's advances, Sun Hao ordered his Prime Minister, Zhang Ti, along with Zhuge Jing, Sun Zhen (孫震) and Shen Ying (沈瑩) with 30,000 soldiers to cross the Yangtze and resist the Jin general. Zhang Ti scored an early victory, capturing Wang Hun's subordinate Zhang Qiao (張喬), but faced difficulties in his next encounter with Wang Hun's other subordinate, Zhou Jun (周浚). Eventually, Zhou Jun, joined by a rebelling Zhang Qiao, overwhelmed the Wu army. Zhang Ti, Sun Zhen, and Shen Ying were killed alongside 7,800 of their soldiers. Zhuge Jing managed to escape while the surviving soldiers scattered and fled.

Zhang Ti's death shook the state of Wu, and the defeat of his army meant that the bulk of the Wu military had been destroyed. Even so, Wang Hun failed to capitalize on his victory by remaining cautious with his next move. Meanwhile, Wang Hun's colleague Wang Jun began making his preparation on arriving first at Wu's capital, Jianye. Wang Hun's subordinate, He Yun (何惲), alerted him about this, but Wang Hun refused to listen, as he believed that they should wait for further instructions. He also thought that Wang Jun would not go against orders, as it was planned that he would be placed under Wang Hun's authority once Wang Jun reached Jianye.

Shortly after, Wang Hun accepted surrenders from Wu's Minister Over the Masses, He Zhi (何植), and the general Sun Yan (孫晏). He, Wang Jun and Sima Zhou received envoys from the Emperor of Wu, Sun Hao, who stated that he was prepared to give his surrender to anyone of them. On 1 May, Wang Jun quickly sailed over to Jianye to meet with Sun Hao. Wang Hun sent a letter to Wang Jun ordering him to stop and discuss together first, but Wang Jun ignored him. In the end, Wang Jun arrived at Jianye and received Sun Hao's surrender, thus ending the Three Kingdoms and unifying China.

=== Dispute with Wang Jun ===
Wang Hun only crossed the Yangtze one day after Wang Jun entered Jianye. After hearing of Sun Hao's surrender, Wang Hun grew dejected and was resentful towards Wang Jun. He was on the verge of attacking Wang Jun, but tensions between the two temporarily subsided after Wang Jun handed Sun Hao over to Wang Hun as a compromise. Not long after, Wang Hun submitted a petition accusing Wang Jun of violating orders and committing crimes. Wang Hun had powerful friends in the court, and Wang Ji was married to Sima Yan's sister Princess Changshan, so the court heavily sided with Wang Hun in the ordeal. They called for Wang Jun to be brought back to Luoyang in a prison cart, but Sima Yan refused, although he acknowledged that Wang Jun had committed transgressions during the conquest. Later, Wang Hun and his supporters began raking up accusations against Wang Jun, including claims that he and his men partook in looting and burning palaces, but Wang Jun was able to defend and explain himself.

Sima Yan ordered his minister, Liu Song, to give the final verdict. Liu Song gave Wang Hun the chief achievement while Wang Jun was given the middle achievement. Despite Liu Song's verdict, Sima Yan was not satisfied with the outcome and would reward Wang Jun handsomely at a later time. Although the situation was resolved, the two men held on to their disdain for one another. In court, Wang Hun would often boast about his achievements in the conquest and storm out whenever he felt upset over not getting to claim victory. Meanwhile, Wang Jun increased his personal security, fearing that Wang Hun may kill him one day. During a visit from Wang Hun, Wang Jun surrounded himself with disciplined guards first before letting Wang Hun in.

== Later life and career ==
Shortly after the conquest, Sima Yan would praise Wang Hun for his merits during the war and promoted his peerage to Duke of Jingling, placing 8,000 households under him. In 280, Wang Hun was reassigned as General Who Stabilizes the East and sent back to defend Shouchun. As Jin had just conquered Wu, Wang Hun refrained from carrying out too many punishments and acted decisively. The former people of Wu in Jiangdong who were initially fearful of the new regime were pacified by Wang Hun's rule and came to respect him.

In January 283, Sima Yan sent Sima You away from the capital to a princely fief at the advice of Xun Xu and Feng Dan (馮紞), a decision which sparked heated debate. Wang Hun wrote a petition against this, arguing that Sima You should remain in the capital and be more involved in politics, but his petition was rejected. In March 285, Wang Hun was made Supervisor of the Left of the Masters of Writing. Wang Hun was said to be inappropriate for the office, so for the most part he consulted his son Wang Ji, who was more capable than him. On 5 February 290, Wang Hun was appointed Minister Over the Masses.

Sima Yan died in May 290 and his developmentally disabled son, Emperor Hui, ascended the throne. Wang Hun was appointed Palace Attendant and was awarded with his own non-commissioned officers. In 291, Empress Jia and the Prince of Chu, Sima Wei, planned to depose the emperor’s regents, the Prince of Ru’nan Sima Liang and Wei Guan. Sima Wei sought Wang Hun to use his popular image as a way to downplay his actions to the public. However, Wang Hun refused, pretending to be ill and locking himself up in his residence with more than a thousand guards. Sima Wei did not dare to force Wang Hun out and carried on without him. After killing the regents, Empress Jia turned on Sima Wei and executed him. Wang Hun led his troops into the palace and was rewarded with the office of Manager of the Affairs of the Masters of Writing. During the coup, Wang Hun's son-in-law Pei Kai sought refuge at Wang's residence as Pei had marriage ties with both Sima Liang and Wei Guan; Pei also brought along Sima Liang's son Sima Yang. With Wang Hun's assistance, both Pei Kai and Sima Yang survived the purge.

After becoming Minister Over the Masses, Wang Hun's fame went into a gradual decline. He died at the age of 75 (by East Asian reckoning) on 4 September 297 and was posthumously named Duke Yuan of Jingling. His eldest son, Wang Shang (王尚) died early, so Wang Ji (王濟; died between 285 and 293) (Note: Wang Ji was still alive in 285 when Emperor Wu appointed him Palace Attendant on 2 March. Also, both Shishuo Xinyu and Wang Ji's biography in Book of Jin recorded that his good friend Sun Chu (孫楚; grandfather of Sun Sheng and Sun Chuo) attended his funeral; Sun Chu himself died in 293 (per his biography in Book of Jin). Wang Ji's biography recorded that he was 46 (by East Asian reckoning) when he died.) was established as Wang Hun's heir. However, Wang Ji also predeceased his father, so Wang Hun's feudal titles ended up with his grandson, Wang Zhuo (王卓), instead. He was replaced as Minister Over the Masses by Wang Rong.
