= Empress He =

Empress He (何皇后) may refer to:

- Empress He (Han dynasty) (died 189), consort and empress dowager of the Han dynasty
- Empress Dowager He (Eastern Wu) (fl. 242–264), empress dowager of the Eastern Wu state
- He Fani (339–404), empress of the Jin dynasty
- He Jingying (fl. 484–494), empress of the Southern Qi dynasty
- Empress He (Tang dynasty) (died 905), consort and empress dowager of the Tang dynasty
