= Wu Can =

Eastern Wu state official (died 245)

- 吾粲

Crown Prince's Tutor (太子太傅)
- In office ? – 245
- Monarch: Sun Quan

Minister Steward (少府)
- In office ?–?
- Monarch: Sun Quan

Colonel of Garrisoned Riders (屯騎校尉)
- In office ?–?
- Monarch: Sun Quan

General of the Household of Illustrious Righteousness (昭義中郎將)
- In office ?–?
- Monarch: Sun Quan

Administrator of Kuaiji (會稽太守)
- In office 222 – ?
- Monarch: Sun Quan

Colonel Who Advises the Army (參軍校尉)
- In office ?–?
- Monarch: Sun Quan

Prefect of Shanyin County
- In office ?–?
- Monarch: Sun Quan

Registrar to General of Chariots and Cavalry (under Sun Quan)
- In office 209 – ?
- Monarch: Sun Quan

Personal details
- Born: Unknown Huzhou, Zhejiang
- Died: 245 Nanjing, Jiangsu
- Occupation: Official
- Courtesy name: Kongxiu (孔休)

Wu Can (died 245), courtesy name Kongxiu, was an official of the state of Eastern Wu during the Three Kingdoms period of China. The orphan son of a shepherd, Wu Can rose through the ranks to become a trusted general and minister at court before his execution during a dispute over who should be the legitimate heir between Sun He and Sun Ba.

== Early life and service under Sun Ce ==
Wu Can was from Wucheng County (烏程縣), Wu Commandery (吳郡), which is part of present-day Huzhou, Zhejiang. He was born sometime in the late Eastern Han dynasty from a poor family, and his father died when Wu Can was young. The Wu historian Zhou Zhao said Wu Can's father was a shepherd. When he was still a child, a old woman saw him and told his mother, “Your son will become a high-ranking government official in the future.”

Around the 190s, Wu Can served as a minor officer under Sun He (孫河), the Chief (長) of Qu'e County (曲阿縣) and a relative of the warlord Sun Ce, who controlled Wu Commandery and many territories in the Jiangdong region. Sun He was impressed by Wu Can so when Sun He was elevated to the status of a general and was allowed to set up his own office, he appointed Wu Can as the Assistant (丞) of Qu'e County and promoted the latter to a Chief Clerk (長史) later. Although he was of humble origin, Wu Can became known for being very competent in his duties and his fame was on par with other officials who were also from Wu Commandery, such as Lu Xun and Bu Jing (卜靜). Both Wu and Yin Li caught the eye of Gu Shao, a noted judge of character, and became his friends with Gu Shao helping promote them to others.

Sun Ce died in 200 CE and was succeeded by his younger brother, Sun Quan, who maintained control over the Jiangdong lands.

== Service under Sun Quan ==
In 209, after Sun Quan was nominally appointed General of Chariots and Cavalry (車騎將軍) by the Han central government, he named Wu Can as his Registrar (主簿). Wu Can was later given greater responsibilities, serving as the Prefect (令) of Shanyin County (山陰縣; present-day Shaoxing, Zhejiang) and as Colonel Who Advises the Army (參軍校尉).

=== Battle of Dongkou ===
In 222, Wu Can participated in the Battle of Dongkou against Eastern Wu's rival state, Cao Wei. He accompanied the Wu generals Lü Fan, He Qi and others to resist the Wei forces led by Cao Xiu. There was stormy weather at the time so the Wu ships became separated from each other when the connecting ropes broke. Some of the ships drifted towards the Wei base and ended up being captured by the enemy while others capsized and threw their sailors overboard. Wu Can and another officer, Huang Yuan (黃淵), were on one of the larger ships which managed to prevail in the storm. The sailors on the ship refused to allow the survivors in the water on board because they feared that their ship would sink due to overloading, so they brandished their weapons at the survivors who were attempting to climb on board. However, Wu Can and Huang Yuan gave orders to their men to save as many survivors as possible. When the men were reluctant to follow orders due to fear of overloading, Wu Can said, "If the ship sinks, we'll all die together! We shouldn't abandon those who are in need of help." Through their efforts, Wu Can and Huang Yuan succeeded in rescuing more than 100 survivors.

=== Later career ===
After the Battle of Dongkou, Wu Can was appointed as the Administrator (太守) of Kuaiji Commandery along the southern shore of Hangzhou Bay. He wanted to recruit a reclusive hermit, Xie Tan (謝譚), to serve in the Wu government but Tan refused, claiming that he was ill. Wu Can remarked, "The Dragon displays its divine power through its movements; the Phoenix proves its worth through its cries. Why should one remain hidden in the far reaches of the sky or remain submerged in the depths of the sea?" Raising many troops, he was made General of the Household of Illustrious Righteousness (昭義中郎將) and joined the Wu general Lü Dai in attacking rebels, credited with capturing Li Huan from Luling though he and Tang Zi with three thousand troops failed to overcome Dong Si's raids in Yuzhang (豫章) and Linchuan over several months.

In 229, Sun Quan declared himself emperor and established the state of Eastern Wu. Throughout the remaining years of his career, Wu Can held the following offices consecutively: Colonel of a Cavalry Garrison (屯騎校尉), Minister Steward (少府) and Crown Prince's Tutor (太子太傅).

=== Downfall and death ===
In the 241, the Crown Prince Sun Deng fell mortally ill and, in his last memorial to his father, listed his tutor Wu Can as one of the officials he felt Sun Quan could trust state affairs to, to be loyal and advise on good rule. In the years after, a power struggle broke out between Sun Quan's sons Sun He and Sun Ba; both of them fought for the succession to their father's throne. Wu Can sided with and spoke up for the elder son and Crown Prince Sun He, whom he regarded as the legitimate heir apparent. He attempted to persuade Sun Quan to have Sun Ba relocated away from the imperial capital Jianye to Xiakou (夏口; in present-day Wuhan, Hubei) and have Yang Zhu (楊笁), an official who supported Sun Ba, reassigned to another position outside Jianye. Wu Can also maintained close contact with the senior general Lu Xun, who was stationed in Wuchang (武昌; present-day Ezhou, Hubei), keeping Lu Xun informed on events. Sun Ba and Yang Zhu responded to this threat to their positions, attacked Wu Can who was subsequently arrested for his correspondence with Lu Xun, imprisoned and eventually executed in 245.

== Appraisal ==
Chen Shou, who wrote Wu Can's biography in the Records of the Three Kingdoms, appraised Wu and Zhu Ju as follows, "Wu Can and Zhu Ju met with unlucky fates and died in the name of righteousness. What a pity!"

== See also ==
- Lists of people of the Three Kingdoms
