= Wang Chang (Three Kingdoms) =

Chinese military general and politician (died 259)

- 王昶
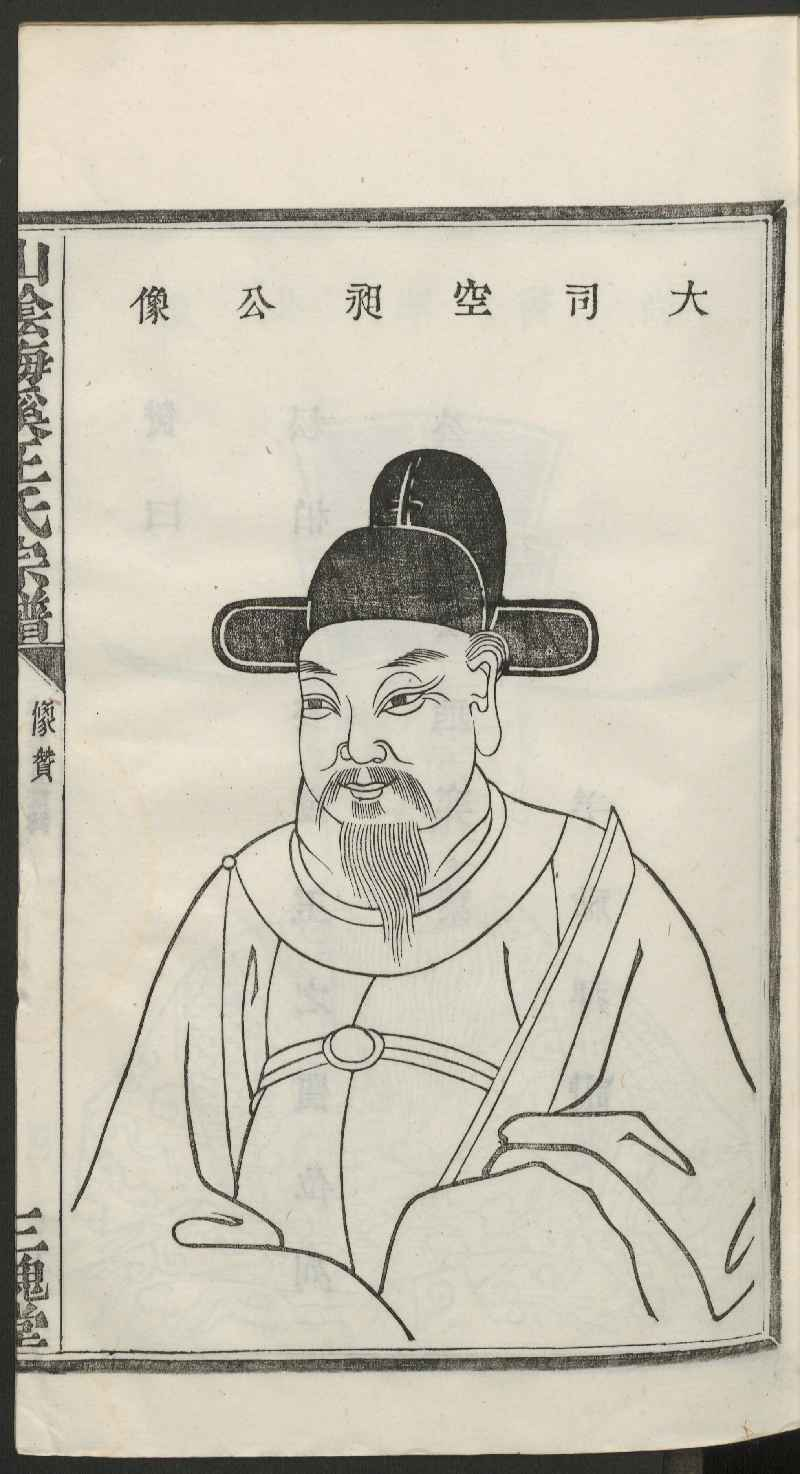

Minister of Works (司空)
- In office 26 September 258 – July or August 259
- Monarch: Cao Mao
- Preceded by: Lu Yu
- Succeeded by: Wang Guan

General of Agile Cavalry (驃騎將軍)
- In office 14 June 255 – 26 September 258
- Monarch: Cao Mao
- Preceded by: Sun Zi

Senior General Who Attacks the South (征南大將軍)
- In office 16 May 251 – 14 June 255
- Monarch: Cao Fang / Cao Mao

General Who Attacks the South (征南將軍)
- In office c. 240s – 16 May 251
- Monarch: Cao Fang

Inspector of Xu Province (徐州刺史)
- In office c. 240s – c. 240s
- Monarch: Cao Fang

General Who Spreads Vehemence (揚烈將軍)
- In office 227–?
- Monarch: Cao Rui

Inspector of Yan Province (兗州刺史)
- In office ?–226
- Monarch: Cao Pi

Personal details
- Born: between 172 and 210 Taiyuan, Shanxi
- Died: July or August 259 (Note: Cao Mao's biography in the Sanguozhi recorded that Wang Chang died in the 6th month of the 4th year of the Ganlu era of Cao Mao's reign. This month corresponds to 7 July to 5 August 259 in the Gregorian calendar. Also, Wang Chang's biography in the same work recorded that he was younger than Wang Ling. Thus, his birth year should be after Wang Ling's 172.)
- Relations: see Wang clan of Taiyuan
- Children: Wang Hun; Wang Shen; Wang Lun; Wang Zhan
- Parent: Wang Ze (father)
- Occupation: Military general, politician
- Courtesy name: Wenshu (文舒)
- Posthumous name: Marquis Mu (穆侯)
- Peerage: Marquis of Jingling (京陵侯)

Wang Chang (died July or August 259), courtesy name Wenshu (文舒), was a Chinese military general and politician of the state of Cao Wei during the Three Kingdoms period of China.

== Early life ==
Wang Chang was from the same commandery as Wang Ling, and both of them were already quite well known when they were still young. As Wang Ling was older than Wang Chang, Chang treated Ling like an elder brother. Wang Chang became a tutor to Cao Pi when the latter was still a prince. After Cao Pi became the emperor of Wei in late 220, Wang Chang was appointed as a Gentleman of Scattered Cavalry (散騎侍郎), Agriculture Officer (洛陽典農) of Luoyang, and Inspector of Yan Province (兗州刺史). After Cao Pi died in 226, his successor Cao Rui promoted Wang Chang to General Who Spreads Vehemence (揚烈將軍) and granted the title of a Secondary Marquis. When Wang Chang was serving in Yan Province, he was still concerned about affairs in the imperial court. He felt that the system of governance in Wei, inherited from the Qin and Han dynasties, was too strict and flawed. He decided to draft a new constitution for the state, and submitted two memorials, Discussion on Governance (治論) and Military Book (兵書), to the Wei imperial court.

== Battles against Eastern Wu ==
In 236, Grand Commandant Sima Yi recommended Wang Chang to the second Wei emperor Cao Rui as a talent. Wang Chang was appointed as the Inspector of Xu Province and enfeoffed as the Marquis of Wuguan Village (武觀亭侯). He was later appointed General Who Attacks the South (征南將軍) and acting supervisor of military affairs in Jing and Yu provinces.

Wang Chang noticed that his base at Wancheng was too far away from Xiangyang, an important city on Wei's southern border. Besides, the military camps in that region were quite scattered and their naval force was far away at Xuanchi. If enemy forces from Wei's rival state Eastern Wu attacked them, their armies would not be able to provide support in time. Hence, Wang Chang changed his base to Xinye, ordered drills to be conducted for their naval forces, and promoted agriculture to build up food supplies.

In 250, during Cao Fang's reign, the political turmoil in Wu had just ended and the Wu general Zhu Ju was recently dismissed by Sun Quan and forced to commit suicide. Wang Chang felt that the time was ripe to attack Wu, so he ordered Zhou Tai to attack Wu (巫), Shigui (柹歸) and Fangling (房陵) counties; Wang Ji to attack Yiling (夷陵); while he personally led an attack on Jiangling (江陵). Wang Chang's troops used bamboo splints to build bridges to cross the Yangtze River and defeated the Wu general Shi Ji, killing Zhongli Mao (鍾離茂) and Xu Min (許旻), returning victorious to Wei with many spoils of war. For his contributions, Wang Chang was promoted to Senior General Who Attacks the South (征南將軍) and promoted from a village marquis to a county marquis under the title "Marquis of Jingling" (京陵侯).

In 252, Wang Chang proposed his plan to attack Wu again. At the same time, Zhuge Dan, Hu Zun and Guanqiu Jian also proposed their respective plans. The Wei regent Sima Shi accepted their proposals and ordered them to attack Wu from three directions. Wang Chang was assigned to attack Nan Commandery, but due to Hu Zun and Zhuge Dan's defeat by the Wu general Zhuge Ke, Wang Chang was forced to retreat.

== Suppressing rebellions ==
In 255, during Cao Mao's reign, the Wei generals Guanqiu Jian and Wen Qin started a rebellion in Shouchun. Wang Chang was promoted to General of Agile Cavalry (驃騎將軍) and tasked with sending troops to help suppress the rebellion. In 257, another Wei general, Zhuge Dan started a rebellion in Shouchun, this time with support from Wu forces. Wang Chang led his army to put pressure on Wu forces at Jiangling, led by Shi Ji and Quan Xi (全熙), and prevent them from coming to Zhuge Dan's aid. In 258, after Zhuge Dan's rebellion was crushed, Wang Chang was promoted to Minister of Works (司空) and rewarded with an additional 1,000 taxable households in his marquisate. He died in the following year and was granted the posthumous title "Marquis Mu" (穆侯). His peerage of Marquis of Jingling was inherited by his son Wang Hun.

== Family ==
Wang Chang was a member of the Wang clan of Taiyuan. According to the New Book of Tang, Wang Chang was a descendant of Qin general Wang Ben.

- Father: Wang Ze (王澤), served as Administrator of Dai Commandery in the Eastern Han dynasty
- Sons:
  - Wang Hun (王渾), served as a general in Wei and later as Minister over the Masses under the Jin dynasty, participated in the conquest of Wu by Jin in 280
  - Wang Shen (王深), served as Inspector of Ji Province
  - Wang Lun (王淪), served as an adviser to the General-in-Chief
  - Wang Zhan (王湛), served as Administrator of Runan Commandery
- Grandsons:
  - Wang Shang (王尚), Wang Hun's eldest son, held a marquis title, died at a young age
  - Wang Ji (王濟), Wang Hun's second son, served as a Palace Attendant during the Jin dynasty
  - Wang Cheng (王澄 (Note: not to be confused with the Jin official and rebel with the same name, who was from the Wang clan of Langya)), Wang Hun's third son, held a marquis title, served as an official during the Jin dynasty
  - Wang Wen (王汶), Wang Hun's fourth son, served as an official during the Jin dynasty
  - Wang Cheng (王承), Wang Zhan's son, served as an Inner Attendant in Donghai Commandery
- Great-grandsons:
  - Wang Zhuo (王卓), Wang Ji's eldest son, served as an official
  - Wang Yu (王聿), Wang Ji's second son, married a Jin dynasty princess, held the title of Marquis of Minyang
  - Wang Shu (王述), Wang Cheng's son, served as a Master of Writing and General of the Guards during the Jin dynasty
- Great-great-grandson:
  - Wang Tanzhi (王坦之), Wang Shu's son, served as a General of the Household and the Inspector of Xu and Yan provinces during the Jin dynasty

== See also ==
- Lists of people of the Three Kingdoms
