= Sun Hao =

Emperor of Eastern Wu from 264 to 280

Sun Hao 孫皓
- Marquis Guiming (歸命侯)
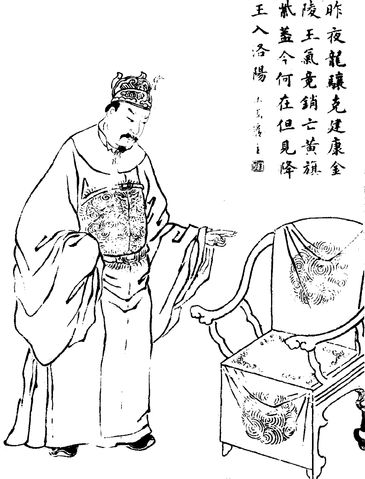
- A Qing dynasty illustration of Sun Hao

Emperor of Eastern Wu
- Reign: 3 September 264 – 1 May 280 (Note: Sun Hao's biography in the Sanguozhi recorded that Sun Hao surrendered on the renshen day of the 3rd month of the 4th year of the Tianji era of his reign. This is an error as there was no renshen day in that month. The Zizhi Tongjian recorded that it was the renyin day of the 3rd month of the 1st year of the Taikang era of Sima Yan's reign. This date corresponds to 1 May 280 in the Gregorian calendar. Emperor Wu's biography in Book of Jin gave the same date as the one recorded in Sun Hao's biography in Sanguozhi. However, Wang Jun's biography recorded a memorial to the throne in which he wrote that he reached Moling on the 15th day of that month. The 15th day of the 3rd month of that year was a renyin day.)
- Predecessor: Sun Xiu

Marquis of Wucheng (烏程侯)
- Tenure: 10 December 258 – 3 September 264
- Born: Sun Pengzu (孫彭祖); Haozong (皓宗) (courtesy name); 242 (Note: The Wu Lu recorded that Sun Hao died in the 12th month of the 4th year of the Taikang era of Sima Yan's reign, and that he was 42 (by East Asian age reckoning) when he died. He was buried in Henan County. The 12th month of the 4th year of the Taikang era corresponds to 5 January to 3 February 284 in the Julian calendar.)
- Died: January or February 284 (aged 41-42)
- Burial: Luoyang, Henan
- Spouse: Empress Teng; Lady Zhang (elder); Lady Zhang (younger)
- Issue (among others): Sun Jin; Sun Qian; Prince of Qi; Prince of Chenliu; Prince of Zhangling; Prince of Chengji; Prince of Xuanwei; Prince of Zhongshan; Prince of Dai; Sun Chong; Sun Fan
Names
- Family name: Sun (孫); Given name: Hao (皓); Courtesy name: Yuanzong (元宗)
Era dates
- Yuanxing (元興): 264–265; Ganlu (甘露) (Note: This era name was also used by Cao Mao from 256 to 260.): 265–266; Baoding (寶鼎): 266–269; Jianheng (建衡): 269–271; Fenghuang (鳳凰): 272–274; Tiance (天冊): 275–276; Tianxi (天璽): 276; Tianji (天紀): 277–280
Posthumous name
- Emperor Mo
- House: House of Sun
- Father: Sun He
- Mother: Lady He

Sun Hao (242 – January or February 284), courtesy name Yuanzong, originally named Sun Pengzu with the courtesy name Haozong, was the fourth and last emperor of the state of Eastern Wu during the Three Kingdoms period of China. He was a son of Sun He, a one-time heir apparent of the founding emperor Sun Quan. He ascended the throne in September 264 after the death of his uncle, Sun Xiu (Emperor Jing), in light of the desire of the people to have an older emperor, considering the recent destruction of Wu's ally state Shu Han. However, he turned out to be a most unfortunate choice, as his cruelty, extravagance and inability to handle domestic matters doomed Wu, which was eventually conquered by the Jin dynasty in 280, ending the Three Kingdoms period.

Sun Hao is also known by other titles: Marquis of Wucheng (烏程侯), which he held before he became emperor; Marquis Guiming (歸命侯; literally "the Marquis who resigns to his fate"), the title given to him by the Jin dynasty after his surrender; Later Lord of Wu (吳後主) and Last Emperor of Wu (吳末帝), which were used by historians to refer to him.

== Early life ==
Sun Hao was born in 242 as Sun He's eldest son. Sun He was named crown prince in February or March 242, a few months after the death of Sun Quan's eldest son and first crown prince, Sun Deng, in May or June 241. Sun Hao's mother, Consort He, was a concubine of Sun He.

In 250, after Sun Quan grew tired of the constant disputes between his sons Sun He and Sun Ba, he forced Sun Ba to commit suicide and exiled Sun He to Guzhang (故鄣; in present-day Huzhou, Zhejiang), presumably along with his family and reduced to commoner status. Sun Hao went from the status of eventual presumed heir to being the son of a commoner, albeit a grandson of the emperor.

In 252, Sun He's status was elevated from commoner status as Sun Quan just before his death that year instated Sun He as the Prince of Nanyang and a princedom at Changsha. Indeed, there were rumours, even after Sun He's younger brother Sun Liang took the throne after Sun Quan's death that the regent Zhuge Ke, an uncle of Sun He's wife Princess Zhang, was interested in restoring Sun He and making Sun He emperor instead. After Zhuge Ke's assassination and replacement by Sun Jun in 253, Sun He fell into danger as Sun Jun had been instrumental in having Sun He deposed in the first place and wanted to eliminate any chance of a Sun He comeback. Sun Jun used the rumours as an excuse to have Sun He demoted back to commoner status and exiled to Xindu (新都; in present-day Chun'an County, Zhejiang), and then sent messengers to force Sun He to commit suicide. Princess Zhang also committed suicide. When offered the chance to also commit suicide, Consort He refused, stating that if she died as well, no one would be left to care for Sun He's sons. Thus, she raised Sun Hao and his three brothers born to other consorts — Sun De (孫德), Sun Qian (孫謙), and Sun Jun (孫俊, not the same person as the regent).

After Sun Liang was deposed by Sun Jun's cousin and successor Sun Chen in 258, Sun Xiu, another son of Sun Quan, became emperor. On 10 December 258, Sun Xiu created Sun Hao and his brothers, Sun De and Sun Qian, marquises. Sun Hao's title was the Marquis of Wucheng (Note: Sun Jian, Sun Xiu's grandfather and Sun Hao's great-grandfather, once held this marquisate during the Eastern Han dynasty.) and he was sent to his marquisate. At some point, he befriended a magistrate of Wucheng County, Wan Yu, who appraised him as intelligent and studious. Also, during his time as Marquis of Wucheng, he took his future empress Lady Teng as a concubine.

In summer 264, Sun Xiu fell ill and was unable to speak but still could write so he wrote an edict summoning the chancellor Puyang Xing to the palace, where he pointed and entrusted his son, crown prince Sun Wan, to Puyang Xing. Sun Xiu died soon thereafter, on 3 September 264. However, Puyang Xing did not follow Sun Xiu's wishes. Rather, after consulting with general Zhang Bu, they believed that the people were, in light of the recent fall of their ally state Shu Han in 263, yearning for a mature emperor. (Note: It is not known how old Sun Wan was at this point, but Sun Xiu himself died at age 29, so it was unlikely that Sun Wan was even a teenager.) At the recommendation of Wan Yu, who was by this point a general, Puyang Xing and Zhang Bu enthroned Sun Hao instead.

== Early reign ==
At first, the people of Wu were impressed with the new emperor as he reduced taxes, gave relief to the poor, and released a large number of ladies in waiting from the palace to let them marry. However, soon that hopefulness was shattered as Sun Hao started to be cruel in his punishments, superstitious, and indulging himself in wine and women. He also demoted Sun Xiu's widow, Empress Dowager Zhu, to the title of "Empress Jing." He honoured his mother Consort He as the empress dowager instead, while posthumously honouring his father Sun He with the title "Emperor Wen". Puyang Xing and Zhang Bu were shocked and disappointed; their disappointment was reported to the emperor who had them arrested and executed along with their clans in late 264. In 264, he also instated his wife Lady Teng as the empress.

In 265, Sun Hao forced the former Empress Dowager Zhu to commit suicide and exiled Sun Xiu's four sons. He soon executed the two eldest, Sun Wan (the former crown prince) and Sun Gong. He then also, believing in a prophecy that the imperial aura had moved from Yang Province to Jing Province and that Jing Province forces would defeat Yang Province forces, undertook a costly move of the capital from Jianye to Wuchang. He also started executing officials who showed disapproval of his wasteful ways regularly. The only major official who was able to speak freely without consequences was Lu Kai, a nephew of Lu Xun and one of the chancellors serving in tandem with Wan Yu, because of the great respect the people had for Lu Kai.

In 266, the Jin dynasty, which newly established itself as the successor to Wu's rival state Cao Wei, after its first emperor, Sima Yan, usurped the Wei throne, sought to establish peace with Wu. Sun Hao instead considered attacking the Jin dynasty, but while he did not do so at that moment, he also did not make peace with the Jin dynasty.

In 266, commoners in present-day Zhejiang unable to withstand Sun Hao's heavy levies (to support his luxuries) rebelled and kidnapped Sun Hao's brother, Sun Qian, as figurehead. They reached Jianye but were eventually defeated by Ding Gu (丁固) and Zhuge Jing, who were responsible for Jianye's defences. Although there was no evidence that Sun Qian was actually involved in the rebellion, Sun Hao not only had Sun Qian but also mother and younger brother, Sun Jun, by the same mother, executed. Sun Hao believed this was a fulfillment of the prophecy that prompted his move of the capital to Wuchang; and later that year, he moved the capital back to Jianye.

In 268, Sun Hao began a policy of periodically attacking Jin border regions; he had his general Zhu Ji (朱繼) attack Jiangxia and Wan Yu attack Xiangyang, while he himself postured to attack Hefei. This attack was repelled by Jin forces, as were several later attacks.

In late 269, Lu Kai died and soon there was no one left in the administration who dared to speak out anymore. After Lu Kai's death, Sun Hao exiled Lu Kai's clan to Jian'an. Lu Xun's son Lu Kang, a general who was in charge of defending Wu's western borders, did periodically submit petitions requesting reforms, but Sun Hao generally ignored them, although he did not punish Lu Kang.

== Late reign ==
In early 271, in the middle of winter, Sun Hao personally launched a major attack against the Jin dynasty and he brought his mother Empress Dowager He, his wife Empress Teng, and thousands of women in his harem along which necessitated heavy labour – from soldiers to drag their wagons – causing the soldiers to murmur about possible defection. Only after Sun Hao heard this possibility did he make the decision to withdraw and return to Jianye. Wan Yu and the senior generals Ding Feng and Liu Ping (留平) had already considered returning to Jianye themselves before Sun Hao chose to withdraw and when Sun Hao heard about this he bore grudges against them as generals who might leave him.

Later that year, Wu forces finally recovered Jiao Province from rebels paying allegiance to the Jin dynasty, who had held out ever since 264 (during Sun Xiu's reign). This gave Sun Hao encouragement and he continued to plan military actions against the Jin dynasty in earnest — although, to his credit, he put his general Tao Huang in charge of Jiao Province and Tao Huang managed the province effectively; the province would not rebel again for the duration of Sun Hao's reign.

In 272, Wang Jun, the Jin governor of Yi Province, with Sima Yan's support began building a massive fleet with the plan to eventually use the fleet in conquering Wu. As the wood shavings from the building project floated down the Yangtze River, the Wu general Wu Yan realised what was happening and requested that the northwestern border be fortified, but Sun Hao refused.

Later in 272, Sun Hao would carry out an action that would lead to a major rebellion — summoning Bu Chan, the general in charge of Xiling (in present-day Yichang, Hubei), back to the capital back to Jianye. Fearful that he was about to be punished somehow, Bu Chan rebelled and defected to the Jin dynasty. While Lu Kang was eventually able to defeat Bu Chan and recover Xiling for Wu, the distrust the Wu generals had for their emperor had been thoroughly exposed and Jin generals became emboldened in proposing plans of conquest to their emperor.

In the same year, Sun Hao, still holding grudges against Wan Yu and Liu Ping for their plan to abandon him and return to Jianye on their own, tried to poison the two of them. Neither died, but when they found out that Sun Hao was behind the poisoning they knew they could not do anything about it; Wan Yu committed suicide while Liu Ping died in distress.

Lu Kang died in 274. In his final petition, he requested Sun Hao to strengthen the defences on Wu's western border, but Sun Hao did not do so. Further, he divided Lu Kang's forces into six different commands, although each was led by one of Lu Kang's sons.

In 275, the senior Wu minister He Shao (賀邵; grandson of He Qi) suffered a stroke and was paralysed. Sun Hao suspected that he was pretending and had him arrested and tortured by whipping and by subjecting him to saws and fires. He died under torture and his clan was exiled. (Note: A New Account of the Tales of the World recorded an anecdote in which Emperor Yuan of Jin once asked He Xun (He Shao's son), who was then sikong, about the identity of his clansman who had his head sawn off by Sun Hao. While He Xun remained silent, Emperor Yuan recalled that it was He Shao. As he cried, He Xun asked for forgiveness from the emperor for not answering an imperial question due to the immense pain and injustice of his father's death. Emperor Yuan was so ashamed that he did not appear in public for three days. This anecdote was also recorded in He Xun's biography in Book of Jin.)

For the next several years, people wishing to flatter Sun Hao often offered him miraculous items (real or manufactured) that purportedly suggest that he would eventually destroy the Jin dynasty and unite China. Sun Hao's superstitious nature became even more aroused and he spent all of his efforts on plans to conquer the Jin dynasty.

== Fall of Eastern Wu ==
In the summer of 279, Guo Ma rose in rebellion in Guangzhou. In late 279, after Sima Yan accepted the advice of Wang Jun and Du Yu, the Jin dynasty finally launched a major attack aiming to conquer Eastern Wu. The attack was in six prongs: with the forces led by Sima Yan's uncle, Sima Zhou; Wang Hun (王渾); Wang Rong; Hu Fen (胡奮); Du; and Wang Jun, with the largest forces under Wang Hun and Wang Jun's command. Each of the Jin forces advanced quickly and captured the border cities that they were targeting with Wang Jun's fleet heading east down the Yangtze and clearing the river of Wu fleets. The Wu imperial chancellor Zhang Ti made a last-ditch attempt to defeat Wang Hun's force, but was defeated and killed. Wang Hun, Wang Jun, and Sima Zhou each headed for Jianye. Sun Hao was forced to surrender in May 280.

Sun Hao and his clan were escorted to the Jin capital Luoyang. (Note: Vol.81 of Zizhi Tongjian recorded that Sun Hao reached Luoyang on the 1st day of the 5th month, which corresponds to 15 Jun 280 in the Julian calendar.) Sun Hao, now a captive, humiliated himself by covering himself with mud and having himself bound behind his back. Sima Yan had Sun Hao unbound and had him seated next to him at the next imperial gathering. He remarked, "I have set this seat for you for a long time." Sun Hao responded, "I also had a seat for your imperial majesty in Jianye." When the Jin official Jia Chong, seeking to humiliate Sun Hao, asked, "I heard that you had such cruel punishments as poking out people's eyes and peeling the facial skin off people. What kind of punishment is this?" Sun Hao replied, "If a subordinate planned to murder his emperor or was treacherous, I would use those punishments on him." Jia Chong, who was instrumental in the Wei emperor Cao Mao's death, felt humiliated and did not respond.

Sima Yan pardoned Sun Hao and further granted the latter the title "Marquis Guiming" (literally "the marquis who resigns to his fate") on 9 July 280. Sun Hao's sons were made junior officials in the Jin government. Sun Hao died in early 284.

== See also ==
- Lists of people of the Three Kingdoms
- List of Chinese monarchs

== Notes ==
Emperor Yuanzong of Eastern Wu House of Sun Born: 243 Died: 284
Regnal titles
Preceded by Sun Xiu	Emperor of Eastern Wu; 264–280	Abolished
Titles in pretence
Preceded by Sun Xiu	— TITULAR — Emperor of China; 264–280; Reason for succession failure: Conquest of Wu by Jin	Succeeded by Sima Yan
