= Battle of Ruxu (222–223) =

Battle between Cao Wei and Eastern Wu (222-223)

Coordinates: 31°38′7.22″N 117°53′20.29″E

Battle of Ruxu (222-223)
- Part of the wars of the Three Kingdoms period
Date	Late 222 – Early 223
Location	Ruxu, Yang Province, on the eastern side of present-day Lake Chaohu, Anhui.
Result	Wei retreat

Belligerents
Cao Wei	Eastern Wu

Commanders and leaders
Cao Ren	Zhu Huan

The Battle of Ruxu, also known as the Battle of Ruxukou, took place in 222-223 between the forces of Cao Wei and Eastern Wu during the Three Kingdoms period. The battle was the third battle taking place between the Cao and Sun clan at Ruxu, but this particular conflict was the only of the three to take place actually during the Three Kingdoms period, as the other two took place in 213 and 217.

== Background ==
Following the Shu Han defeat at the Battle of Xiaoting, the alliance between Cao Pi and Sun Quan was tested, because the protection the agreement held was no longer needed as the Shu forces reestablished their own relations with the Sun clan. After Sun Deng, the crown prince and eldest son of Sun Quan, was demanded by Cao Pi as hostage, Sun Quan's relations with Wei ultimately plummeted. However, Cao Pi was trying to sour diplomatic relations between the Liu clan and the Sun clan. In November 222, Sun Quan declared himself independent once again from Wei, and Cao Pi responded with force.

The plan for Wei was to strike Wu in three different ways along the Yangtze River. Wei generals Xiahou Shang and Cao Zhen attacked Jiangling and Nan Commandery, Cao Xiu and Zang Ba attacked Dongkou, and Cao Ren attacked Ruxu.

== The battle ==
Cao Ren led a large army against the position but first disseminated false information indicating that he was going to attack Xianxi. The general defending Ruxu, Zhu Huan, took the bait and sent much of his army to Xianxi. After the ploy succeeded, Cao Ren attacked Ruxu. Zhu Huan soon realized his mistake, but there was no time for him to recall his soldiers before Cao Ren attacked. Cao Ren’s army experienced great success initially and destroyed all of Zhu Huan’s armies in the field. Zhu Huan had a plan though. He decided to make his army look even smaller than it really was in order to lure Cao Ren out and ambush him. He hid his soldiers in the homes of civilians, struck his banners, and stilled his drums to make the city look almost deserted. Cao Ren believed that Zhu Huan sent nearly all of his men to Xianxi, so he had his son Cao Tai attack the city. He also sent a naval force under Chang Diao, Zhuge Qian, and Wang Shuang to capture a certain island in the river where the families of Zhu Huan’s officers stayed. Cao Ren himself remained at the rear to offer support.

Cao Tai and the others fell right into Zhu Huan’s trap. Cao Tai attacked the city, thinking it was undefended, and Zhu Huan was able to ambush him with the hidden soldiers and force him to retreat. He also ambushed the naval force sent to the island, killing Chang Diao, capturing Wang Shuang and dealing heavy losses to the Wei army. This earned Zhu Huan a brief respite, during which time he was able to recall his soldiers. Cao Ren now personally took command of the siege and attacked Ruxu, but Zhu Huan was able to regroup his soldiers and defend the city. After several months of furious battle, disease and loss took enough of a toll on the Wei army that Cao Pi decided to order Cao Ren to retreat.

== Aftermath ==
Cao Ren died after the battle ended in 223. He was posthumously named "Marquis Zhong" (忠侯).

== Order of battle ==
=== Wei forces ===
- Minister of War (大司马) Cao Ren
  - † Chang Diao
  - (POW) Wang Shuang

=== Wu forces ===
- Area Commander of Ruxu Zhu Huan
  - Zhou Shao, Zhou Tai's son
  - Luo Tong
  - Yan Gui
