= Wang Rong (Jin dynasty) =

Chinese general, poet and official (234–305)

- 王戎
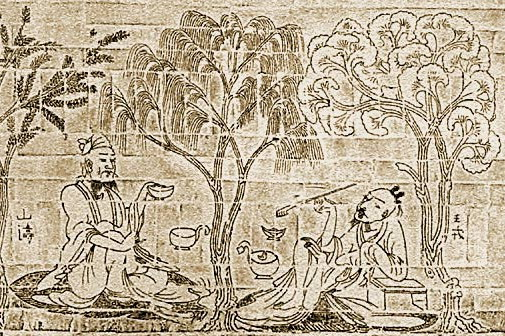
- Wang Rong (right) with Shan Tao, in a relief dating from the 4th century.

Minister over the Masses (司徒)
- In office 302 – 305
- In office 297 – 300

Prefect of the Masters of Writing (尚書令)
- In office 301 – 302

Secretary of Personnel (吏部尚書)
- In office 291 – 297

Left Supervisor of the Affairs of the Masters of Writing (尚書左僕射)
- In office 291 – 297

Household Counsellor (光祿大夫)
- In office 291 – 291

Prefect of the Palace Writers (中書令)
- In office 291 – 291

Crown Prince's Grand Tutor (太子太傅)
- In office 290 – 291
- Monarch: Emperor Hui of Jin

Minister of the Household (光祿勲)
- In office 284 – 290

Palace Attendant
- In office 282 – 284

General who Establishes Might (建威將軍)
- In office 278 – 280

Inspector of Yu Province (豫州刺史)
- In office 278 – 280

Inspector of Jing Province (荊州刺史)
- In office 276 – 278
- Monarch: Emperor Wu of Jin

Personal details
- Born: 234 Linyi, Shandong
- Died: 11 July 305 Jia County, Henan
- Children: Wang Wan; Wang Xing; Pei Wei's wife (daughter)
- Parent: Wang Hun (father)
- Occupation: Military general, poet, politician
- Courtesy name: Junchong (濬沖)
- Posthumous name: Yuan (元)
- Peerage: Marquis of Anfeng (安豐侯)

Wang Rong (234 – 11 July 305), courtesy name Junchong (濬冲), nickname A Rong (阿戎), posthumously known as Marquis Yuan of Anfeng (安豐元侯), was a Chinese military general, poet, and politician of the Western Jin dynasty. He was also one of the Seven Sages of the Bamboo Grove.

== Life ==
=== Under Cao Wei ===
Wang Rong was born in 234, during Cao Rui's reign. In c.late 230s, when Wang Rong was six or seven years old (by East Asian reckoning), he was watching a show where beasts roared ferociously in their enclosures. While those around him scattered, Wang Rong remained at ease at where he was standing. From where he was, Cao Rui saw what had happened, and was impressed.

In c.248, when Wang Rong was fifteen years old (by East Asian reckoning), he stayed with his father Wang Changyuan at the latter's official residence. Ruan Ji was Wang Changyuan's friend and about 20 years older than Rong. Yet, every time Ruan visited Changyuan, he would remain with Changyuan for a short while before turning his attention to Wang Rong. Ruan would then have a very long chat with Wang Rong before leaving. Ruan once said to Changyuan, "Junchong is elegant and worthy of appreciation, which is something you cannot compare with. Instead of talking to you, I would rather speak with A Rong."

In late 263, just before Zhong Hui set out on Wei's expedition to conquer Shu, he went to bide Wang Rong farewell, and asked Wang for advice. Wang Rong replied, "Taoism has a saying: 'Do not claim credit after doing good deeds'. It is not difficult to succeed; what is difficult is to maintain and protect." Later, as Zhong Hui failed in his rebellion, people felt that Wang Rong had foresight.

=== Under Jin dynasty ===
==== During Emperor Wu's reign ====
Wang Rong was about 32 years old when Sima Yan usurped the throne from Cao Huan and founded the Jin dynasty in February 266. Initially, Wang Rong served under the Jin dynasty as a military general. During the Battle of Xiling, Wang Rong was nearly executed by Yang Hu for violating military law.

Wang later participated in the conquest of the Jin dynasty's rival state, Eastern Wu in 280. During the campaign, he led his troops as far as to that of Wuchang (武昌; present day Ezhou, Hubei). Following this, Wang Rong's army merged with Wang Jun's and they advanced towards the Wu capital, Jianye.

==== During Emperor Hui's reign ====
In c.October 297, with Empress Jia Nanfeng as the de facto regent, Wang Rong was made Minister Over the Masses, replacing Wang Hun, who had died in September. He was replaced as Minister Over the Masses by He Shao (何劭; son of He Zeng [何曾]) on 11 May 300, after Sima Lun's coup earlier that month. It is unknown when exactly Wang Rong was reappointed Minister Over the Masses, only that it was after the death of Sima Lun's half-brother Sima Rong in June 302; Rong was both Grand Chancellor (taizai) and Minister Over the Masses when he died.

== Family ==
Wang Rong was a member of the Wang clan of Langya.

- Grandfather: Wang Xiong (王雄; (Note: The exact relationship between Wang Xiong and Wang Xiang is unknown; a Wang Shi Pu annotation in Cui Lin's biography in Sanguozhi recorded that Wang Xiong belonged to the same clan (宗).) fl.220-235), regional inspector (cishi) of You Prefecture (幽州刺史) under Cao Wei. At You Prefecture, Wang Xiong's most significant achievement was to send Han Long (韩龙) to assassinate Kebineng.
- Father: Wang Hun (王浑), (Note: not the same person as the general who took part in the conquest of Wu, whose courtesy name is "Xuanchong".) courtesy name Changyuan (长源), cishi of Liang Prefecture (凉州刺史)
- Cousin: Wang Yan

== See also ==
- Lists of people of the Three Kingdoms
