= Ding Feng (general) =

Eastern Wu state general and official (died 271)

- 丁奉
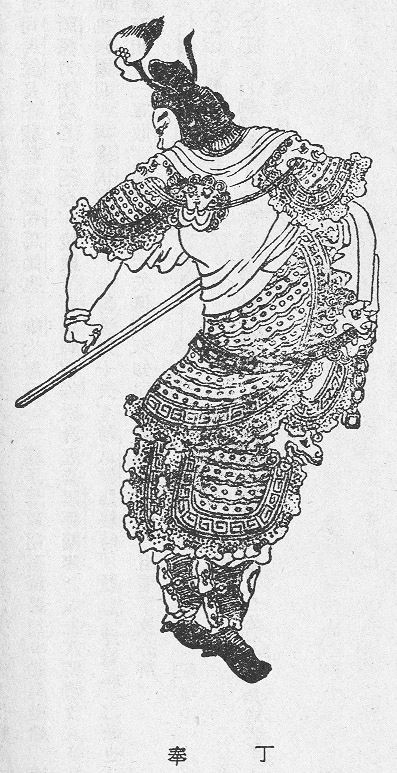
- A Qing dynasty illustration of Ding Feng

Right Grand Marshal (右大司馬) (alongside Shi Ji)
- In office September 264 – 271
- Monarch: Sun Hao
- Succeeded by: Lu Kang

Left Military Adviser (左軍師)
- In office September 264 – 271
- Monarch: Sun Hao

General-in-Chief (大將軍)
- In office 258 – September 264
- Monarch: Sun Xiu

General of the Left (左將軍)
- In office 258
- Monarch: Sun Liang

Personal details
- Born: unknown Gushi County, Henan
- Died: 271 (Note: Ding Feng's biography in the Sanguozhi recorded that he died in the 3rd year of the Jianheng era (269–271) of Sun Hao's reign.)
- Relations: Ding Fēng (brother); Ding Wen (son)
- Occupation: Military general, politician
- Courtesy name: Chengyuan (承淵)
- Peerage: Marquis of Anfeng (安豐侯)

Ding Feng (died 271), courtesy name Chengyuan, was a Chinese military general and politician of the state of Eastern Wu during the Three Kingdoms period of China.

== Early life and career ==
Ding Feng was from Anfeng County (安豐縣), Lujiang Commandery (廬江郡), which is in present-day Gushi County, Henan. He started his career as a soldier under the warlord Sun Quan sometime towards the end of the Han dynasty, and was commissioned as an officer for his courage in battle. He served as a subordinate of various generals under Sun Quan, including Gan Ning, Lu Xun and Pan Zhang. He fought in many wars for his lord and was well known for his valour. He was also wounded in battle several times and had slain many enemy commanders and captured the enemy's flags. He was promoted to Lieutenant-General (偏將軍) for his achievements.

== Service under Sun Liang ==
In 252, Sun Liang succeeded his father Sun Quan as the emperor of the state of Eastern Wu. He appointed Ding Feng as Champion General (冠軍將軍) and enfeoffed him as a Marquis of a Chief Village (都亭侯).

=== Battle of Dongxing ===
In 252, Sima Shi, the regent of Wu's rival state Wei, sent Zhuge Dan and Hu Zun to lead the Wei armies to attack the Wu garrison at Dongxing (東興; southeast of present-day Chaohu City, Anhui). In response, the Wu regent Zhuge Ke led the Wu forces to resist the enemy, leading to the Battle of Dongxing between Wu and Wei.

The Wu generals said: "When the enemy learns that the Grand Tutor (Zhuge Ke) is coming here personally, they will surely retreat when we reach the shore." However, only Ding Feng had a different view: "No. They are making large movements in their territory. They are prepared, as they have mobilised large numbers of troops from Xuchang and Luoyang, so why would they go back empty-handed? Don't think that the enemy won't come. We should ready ourselves for battle." When Zhuge Ke reached Dongxing, he placed Ding Feng, Liu Zan (留贊), Lü Ju and Tang Zi in charge of the vanguard and they moved west along mountainous terrain. Ding Feng warned: "We are moving too slow. If the enemy seizes favourable ground, it will be harder to deal with them." He then led 3,000 soldiers with him, travelling on a different route from the main bulk of Wu forces.

Strong north winds were blowing at that time. Ding Feng and his 3,000 men reached the frontline within two days and seized control of Xu Embankment (徐塘). It was in winter and there was snowfall. The Wei officers were off guard and having a drinking session, so, despite the feeble size of his army, Ding Feng rallied his men and said: "Today is the day we claim titles and rewards!" He then ordered his troops to remove their armour and helmets, discard their jis and spears, and arm themselves with only shields and short weapons such as swords. The Wei soldiers laughed when they saw this event, and instead refused to ready themselves for combat. Ding Feng and his men fought bravely and destroyed the enemy camp at the front. Just then, another Wu force led by Lü Ju and a few others arrived, therefore joining Ding Feng in attacking the enemy camp. The Wei forces suffered a crushing a defeat.

Ding Feng was promoted to General Who Destroys Bandits (滅寇將軍) and had his marquis rank increased by one grade for his efforts in the battle.

=== Shouchun rebellions ===
In 255, the Cao Wei generals Guanqiu Jian and Wen Qin started a rebellion in the Wei-controlled Shouchun (壽春; present-day Shou County, Anhui). However, the revolt failed and Wen Qin fled towards Wu to seek refuge. Ding Feng was appointed as General of Tiger's Might (虎威將軍) and he followed an army led by the Wu regent Sun Jun to receive Wen Qin. They encountered Wei forces pursuing Wen Qin at Gaoting (高亭) and engaged the enemy in battle. Ding Feng, armed with a long spear and on horseback, led a charge into the enemy formation and they slew hundreds of Wei soldiers and seized much of the enemy's weapons and equipment. He was enfeoffed as the Marquis of Anfeng (安豐侯) for his achievements.

In 257, another rebellion led by the Wei general Zhuge Dan broke out in Shouchun again. Zhuge Dan requested aid from Wu and the Wu regent Sun Chen agreed. Sima Zhao personally led the Wei armies to suppress the revolt and they attempted to surround Shouchun. Sun Chen ordered Zhu Yi and Tang Zi to help Zhuge Dan, and later sent Li Fei (黎斐) and Ding Feng to lift the siege on Shouchun. Ding Feng stationed at Lijiang (黎漿) and he fought bravely in battle even though the rebellion was eventually crushed by Wei forces and the Wu army sustained heavy losses. Despite the failure of the campaign, Ding Feng was still held in high regard in Wu, as he was subsequently appointed as General of the Left (左將軍).

== Service under Sun Xiu ==
In 258, Sun Chen deposed the second Wu emperor Sun Liang and replaced the latter with Sun Xiu. Sun Xiu was unhappy that Sun Chen monopolised state power so he plotted with the minister Zhang Bu to eliminate Sun Chen. Zhang Bu told the emperor, "Ding Feng may not be proficient in administrating civil affairs, but he is an outstanding strategist and is capable of making important decisions." Sun Xiu then summoned Ding Feng and told him: "Sun Chen usurps state power and is plotting treason. I want you to help me eliminate him." Ding Feng replied: "The Imperial Chancellor (Sun Chen) and his brothers have many supporters. Not everyone in the imperial court is on our side. We cannot confront them directly. I suggest that Your Majesty order your soldiers to kill him during the Laba Festival." Sun Xiu followed Ding Feng's plan and pretended to invite Sun Chen to the palace to celebrate the Laba Festival. When Sun Chen stepped inside, Ding Feng and Zhang Bu signalled to the imperial guards to kill him. For his contributions, Ding Feng was promoted to the position of General-in-Chief (大將軍) and received the additional appointments of Left and Right Protector-Generals (左右都護).

In 259, Ding Feng was appointed as the nominal Governor of Xu Province. In 263, when the state of Wei launched a campaign to conquer Wu's ally Shu, Ding Feng led the Wu forces to attack Shouchun (壽春; present-day Shou County, Anhui) in an attempt to divert Wei attention away from Shu. However, it was too late as the Shu emperor Liu Shan had already surrendered to Wei, marking the end of Shu. When Ding Feng received news of the fall of Shu, he withdrew the Wu armies from Shouchun.

== Service under Sun Hao ==
When Sun Xiu died in 264, Ding Feng and Puyang Xing heeded Wan Yu's advice and decided to install Sun Hao on the throne. After his accession, Sun Hao appointed Ding Feng as Right Grand Marshal (右大司馬) and Left Military Adviser (左軍師).

In December 268 or January 269, Sun Hao ordered Ding Feng and Zhuge Jing to lead an army to attack Hefei, which was under the control of the Jin dynasty (which replaced the state of Wei in February 266). Ding Feng exchanged letters with the Jin general Shi Bao (石苞), in which they discussed some trivial things. Shi Bao later ordered the Jin army to retreat.

In 269, Ding Feng was ordered to garrison at Xu Embankment (徐塘) and later attack the Jin territory of Guyang (穀陽). When the residents in Guyang learnt of the Wu army's approach, they immediately evacuated the area and Ding Feng did not obtain anything in the campaign. Sun Hao was furious when he heard about that, and he executed Ding Feng's army guide.

In c.February 270, Qian Hong, the Inspector of Yangzhou appointed by the Jin court, repelled an invasion led by Ding Feng.

== Death ==
Ding Feng died in 271. His cause of death was not recorded in history. In his later years, Ding Feng gradually became arrogant as he achieved more glory for his contributions on the battlefield. He was slandered and defamed by others after his death. However, Sun Hao still recognised Ding Feng for his meritorious service, so he did not massacre Ding Feng's family. Instead, he only killed Ding's son Ding Wen [丁温] (Note: "Ding Wen" did not appear in Ding Feng's biography in Sanguozhi, but was mentioned in Book of Jin.) and exiled the rest to Linchuan (臨川; present-day Linchuan District, Fuzhou, Jiangxi).

In 2020-2021, four brick tombs belonging to Ding Feng and his family were excavated at Nanjing. The tombs had been robbed, but four land purchase certificates inscribed on brick were found in one tomb, which indicated that the occupants of this tomb were Ding Feng and his wife. The certificates further indicated that Ding Feng and his wife died in 271 and 251 respectively.

== Anecdote ==
After Ding Feng's death and his family's exile, his residence was subsequently acquired by Zhou Yi (Note: who was indirectly killed by Wang Dao), Su Jun, Yuan Yuezhi (袁悦之, who was later executed) and Sima Xiu (司马秀, who was later executed after being involved in a rebellion). Since all the subsequent owners met with violent deaths, the residence was deemed cursed. A later owner, Zang Tao (臧焘), met with much misfortune although he did not die a violent death. The residence later passed into the hands of Wang Sengchuo, father of Wang Jian. Wang dismissed the possibility of a curse and proceeded to build his residence at the location. Before he could move into his new residence, he was executed.

== Family ==
Ding Feng's younger brother, Ding Fēng (丁封), (Note: Note that the Chinese characters for Feng in their names are different.) also served as a general in Eastern Wu and the highest position he attained was General of the Rear (後將軍). The younger Ding Feng died before his elder brother.

== In popular culture ==
Ding Feng is first introduced as a playable character in the seventh instalment of Koei's Dynasty Warriors video game series.

== See also ==
- Lists of people of the Three Kingdoms
