= Empress Dowager He (Eastern Wu) =

3rd-century Empress Dowager of Eastern Wu

Empress Dowager He 何太后

Empress dowager of Eastern Wu
- Tenure: October 264 – ?
- Predecessor: Empress Jing
- Born: Unknown; Jurong, Jiangsu
- Died: Unknown
- Spouse: Sun He
- Issue: Sun Hao
- Father: He Sui

Empress Dowager He (fl. 230–264), personal name unknown, was an empress dowager of the state of Eastern Wu during the Three Kingdoms period of China. She was a concubine of Sun He, a son of Wu's founding emperor Sun Quan. She became the empress dowager during the reign of her son Sun Hao, the fourth and last emperor of Wu.

== Life ==
Lady He was from Jurong County (句容縣), Danyang Commandery (丹陽郡), which is present-day Jurong, Jiangsu. Her father, He Sui (何遂), was a cavalryman who served under Sun Quan, the founding emperor of Wu. One day, when Sun Quan was inspecting his troops, he noticed her peeking out and looking at the assembled troops, and found her unusual. He then arranged for her to be a concubine of his third son, Sun He. In 243, she gave birth to Sun He's first son, Sun Hao, about one year after Sun He was designated crown prince to replace his elder brother, Sun Deng.

In the 240s, a power struggle broke out between Sun He and his younger brother Sun Ba, the Prince of Lu, with both of them vying for the succession to their father's throne. In 250, the conflict ended with Sun Quan deposing Sun He and forcing Sun Ba to commit suicide. Lady He, along with the rest of Sun He's family members, was reduced to commoner status. Later Sun Quan Sun Liang restored Sun He to Prince of Nanyang with his princedom at Changsha Commandery. In 252, Sun Quan died and was succeeded by his youngest son, Sun Liang, who became the second Wu emperor. However, one year later, the regent Sun Jun, who controlled Sun Liang, forced Sun He to commit suicide. Sun He's official spouse, Consort Zhang, committed suicide to join her husband. When Lady He, as a concubine of Sun He, was offered the opportunity to take her own life, she refused and pleaded to be spared on the grounds that someone had to raise Sun He's children. She raised Sun Hao (her own son), and Sun He's three other sons – Sun De (孫德), Sun Qian (孫謙) (born to his other concubines) and Sun Jun (孫俊) (born to Consort Zhang).

In 264, after the death of the third Wu emperor Sun Xiu, the officials Puyang Xing (濮陽興) and Zhang Bu chose Sun Hao to be the new emperor. After ascending the throne, Sun Hao honoured his late father with the posthumous title of an emperor, and instated his mother as the empress dowager. Empress Dowager He and her family became very powerful during her son's reign. It is not known when she died, although she probably lived to see the fall of Eastern Wu in 280 when it was conquered by the Jin dynasty.

== See also ==
- Eastern Wu family trees
- Lists of people of the Three Kingdoms
