= Lü Ju =

Chinese Eastern Wu state general (died 256)

- 呂據

General of Agile Cavalry (驃騎將軍)
- In office 253 – 12 November 256
- Monarch: Sun Liang

General of the Right (右將軍)
- In office 252 – 253
- Monarch: Sun Liang

Personal details
- Born: Unknown
- Died: 12 November 256 (Note: Sun Liang's biography in the Sanguozhi recorded that Lü Ju was captured and executed on the xinhai day of the 10th month of the 1st year of the Taiping era of Sun Liang's reign. This date corresponds to 12 November 256 in the Gregorian calendar.)
- Parent: Lü Fan (father)
- Occupation: General
- Courtesy name: Shiyi (世議)
- Peerage: Marquis of Wanling (宛陵侯)

Lü Ju (died 12 November 256), courtesy name Shiyi, was a military general of the state of Eastern Wu during the Three Kingdoms period of China. He was the second son of Lü Fan, a general who served under Sun Quan, the founding emperor of Wu. In 252, following Sun Quan's death, Wu's rival state, Wei, sent an army to invade Wu, leading to the Battle of Dongxing. Lü Ju participated in the battle alongside the Wu regent Zhuge Ke and general Ding Feng, and defeated the enemy. In 256, he got into conflict with the Wu regent Sun Chen and committed suicide after being cornered by the latter's forces.

== Life ==
During Sun Jun's sudden illness in 256, he chose to transfer his power to Sun Chen. Sun Jun died soon thereafter, and Sun Chen became regent. Lü Ju was angry at the development (Note: Sun Jun was already resented for his dictatorial style and lack of accomplishments.), and, in conjunction with the minister Teng Yin, he attempted to overthrow Sun Chen. Sun Chen struck back militarily, and his forces defeated Teng Yin and Lü Ju. Teng Yin and his clan were executed while Lü Ju committed suicide. (Note: Sun Chen's biography in Sanguozhi recorded that when Lü Ju heard of Sun Chen's appointment, he was "greatly alarmed" (大恐). Also, Sun Chen's biography recorded that Lü Ju got the other generals together and jointly propose that Teng Yin be made chancellor. The Zizhi Tongjian adopted the view that Lü Ju was angry. Also, in his annotations, Hu Sanxing wrote that Lü Ju chose to commit suicide to preserve his honor, as his father Lü Fan had helped Sun Ce to found Wu, and so he was ashamed to be branded a traitor.)

== See also ==
- Lists of people of the Three Kingdoms
