= Zhu Yi (Eastern Wu) =

Eastern Wu general (died 257)

- 朱異

General Who Guards the South (鎮南將軍)
- In office 252 – 26 September 257
- Monarch: Sun Liang

General Who Spreads Martial Might (揚武將軍)
- In office ? – 252
- Monarch: Sun Quan

Lieutenant-General (偏將軍)
- In office 241 – ?
- Monarch: Sun Quan

Cavalry Commandant (騎都尉)
- In office 237 – 241
- Monarch: Sun Quan

Personal details
- Born: Unknown Suzhou, Jiangsu
- Died: 26 September 257 (Note: Sun Liang's biography in the Sanguozhi mentioned that Sun Chen executed Zhu Yi on the jisi day of the 9th month in the 2nd year of the Taiping era in Sun Liang's reign. This date corresponds to 26 September 257 in the Gregorian calendar.) Chaohu, Anhui
- Parent: Zhu Huan (father)
- Occupation: General
- Courtesy name: Jiwen (季文)

Zhu Yi (died 26 September 257), courtesy name Jiwen, was a military general of the state of Eastern Wu during the Three Kingdoms period of China.

== Life ==
Zhu Yi was the son of the Wu general Zhu Huan, who was from Wu County, Wu Commandery, which is present-day Suzhou, Jiangsu. He gained his first military appointment as a Cavalry Commandant (騎都尉) after his father's death in 238. His first field assignment was in 241 when he followed Zhu Ran in the latter's assault on the Wei fortress at Fancheng, but it would be his victory over the Wei general Wen Qin that cemented his reputation as a capable commander. Zhu Yi personally led 2,000 troops to destroy all seven of Wen Qin's encampments, decapitating several hundred men in the process, and earning him a promotion to Lieutenant-General (偏將軍). The Wu emperor Sun Quan remarked afterward that Zhu Yi was even braver and sturdier than he had heard.

In 252, Zhu Yi thwarted a Wei invasion when he led a naval force to attack and destroy the floating bridges built by the Wei generals Hu Zun (胡遵) and Zhuge Dan in their attempt to cross the Yangtze River into Wu territory.

In 257, when the Wei general Zhuge Dan started a rebellion against the Wei regent Sima Zhao, the Wu regent Sun Chen dispatched an army of 30,000 to aid Zhuge Dan in Shouchun (present-day Shou County, Anhui), and dispatched another 30,000 troops led by Zhu Yi to a county just south of Shouchun to act as the rear guard. The Wei general Zhou Tai defeated Zhu Yi's army and inflicted over 2,000 casualties. Sun Chen then ordered another 50,000 men, commanded in part by Zhu Yi, to attack the Wei forces. Leaving his baggage train and the bulk of his forces at Dulu (都陸), he travelled upstream and made a night crossing on floating bridges with 6,000 of his bravest fighters, but the Wei generals Zhang He and Shi Bao (石苞) detected his forces and defeated them. Zhu Yi regrouped but was again driven back. Later, the Wei officer Hu Lie (胡烈) led 5,000 men to launch a sneak attack on Zhu Yi's baggage train and managed to burn down his supplies.

Sun Chen sent another 30,000 men to assist Zhu Yi and fight the Wei forces to the death, if necessary, but Zhu Yi was unwilling to fight without supplies or food. Sun Chen was so enraged that he had Zhu Yi executed at Huoli (鑊裡; in present-day Chaohu, Anhui).

== See also ==
- Lists of people of the Three Kingdoms
