= Sun Chen =

Eastern Wu general and regent (231 - Jan 259)

- 孫綝

Imperial Chancellor (丞相)
- In office 3 December 258 – 18 January 259
- Monarch: Sun Xiu
- Preceded by: Sun Jun
- Succeeded by: Puyang Xing

Governor of Jing Province (荊州牧)
- In office 3 December 258 – 18 January 259
- Monarch: Sun Xiu

General-in-Chief (大將軍)
- In office December 256 – 3 December 258
- Monarch: Sun Liang
- Preceded by: Sun Jun
- Succeeded by: Ding Feng

General of the Military Guards (武衛將軍)
- In office 19 October 256 – December 256
- Monarch: Sun Liang

Personal details
- Born: 231 (Note: Sun Chen's biography in the Sanguozhi recorded that he died on the wuchen day of the 12th month of the 1st year of the Yong'an era of Sun Xiu's reign, and that he was 28 (by East Asian age reckoning) when he died. His death date corresponds to 18 January 259 in the Gregorian calendar.)
- Died: 18 January 259 (aged 27 or 28) Nanjing, Jiangsu
- Relations: See Eastern Wu family trees
- Parent: Sun Chuo (father)
- Occupation: Military general, regent
- Courtesy name: Zitong (子通)
- Peerage: Marquis of Yongning (永寧侯)

Sun Chen (231 – 18 January 259), courtesy name Zitong, was the seventh Imperial Chancellor of the state of Eastern Wu during the Three Kingdoms period of China. He ruled as regent during the reigns of the emperors Sun Liang and Sun Xiu. His conflict with Sun Liang eventually led him to depose the emperor in favour of Sun Xiu. However, he was subsequently killed by Sun Xiu in a coup.

== As a regent ==
Sun Chen and his predecessor Sun Jun were cousins; both were great-grandsons of the founding emperor Sun Quan's uncle Sun Jing, and grandsons of Sun Gao (孙暠). Very little is known about his career up to Sun Jun's sudden illness in 256, when the latter chose to transfer his power to Sun Chen. Sun Jun died soon thereafter, and Sun Chen became regent. The general Lü Ju was angry at the development, (Note: Sun Jun was already resented for his dictatorial style and lack of accomplishments. However, Lü Ju being angry (大怒) at Sun Chen's appointment was found in Lü's biography in Sanguozhi; Sun Chen's biography recorded that when Lü Ju heard of Sun Chen's appointment, he was "greatly alarmed" (大恐).) and, in conjunction with the minister Teng Yin, he attempted to overthrow Sun Chen. Sun Chen struck back militarily, and his forces defeated Teng Yin and Lü Ju. Teng Yin and his clan were executed while Lü Ju committed suicide. In the light of his defeat of Teng Yin and Lü Ju, Sun Chen began to become extremely arrogant.

In 257, at the age of 14, Sun Liang began to personally handle some important matters of state. He established a personal guard corps, consistent of young men and officers with age similar to his, stating that he intended to grow up with them. He also sometimes questioned Sun Chen's decisions. Sun Chen began to be somewhat apprehensive of the young emperor.

== Third Rebellion in Shouchun ==
Later that year, Cao Wei's general Zhuge Dan, believing that the Wei regent Sima Zhao was about to usurp the throne, declared a rebellion and requested Wu assistance. A small Wu detachment, led by Wen Qin, himself a former Wei general who had defected to Wu, quickly arrived to assist him, but Sun Chen led the main forces and chose to camp a long distance away from Shouchun, where Zhuge Dan was being besieged by Sima Zhao, and did nothing. When Sun Chen instead ordered the general Zhu Yi to try to relieve Shouchun with tired and unfed troops, Zhu refused — and Sun Chen executed him, bringing anger from the people, who had admired Zhu's military skills and integrity. With Sun Chen unable to do anything, Zhuge Dan's rebellion failed in 258, and Wen Qin's troops became captives of Wei.

Sun Chen knew that the people and the young emperor were both angry at him, and chose not to return to Jianye, but instead sent his confidants to be in charge of the capital's defences. Sun Liang became angrier, and plotted with his sister Sun Luban, the general Liu Cheng (劉丞/劉承), his father-in-law Quan Shang (全尚), and his brother-in-law Quan Ji (全記), to have Sun Chen overthrown. However, Quan Shang did not keep the plot secret from his wife, who was Sun Chen's cousin, and she told Sun Chen. Sun Chen quickly captured Quan Shang and killed Liu Cheng, and then surrounded the palace and forced the other officials to agree to depose Sun Liang — falsely declaring to the people that Sun Liang had suffered psychosis. Sun Liang was demoted to the status of a prince, "Prince of Kuaiji".

== Downfall and death ==
Sun Chen then chose Sun Liang's elder brother Sun Xiu, the Prince of Langye, as the new emperor. Sun Xiu, in order to appease Sun Chen, added five counties to his fief and created his brothers marquises as well. However, Sun Chen soon had a fallout with the new emperor over a relatively small incident — Sun Chen had brought beef and wine to the palace, intending to feast with the emperor, but Sun Xiu refused the offering, and so Sun Chen took the food and wine to the house of the general Zhang Bu. He expressed to Zhang Bu his disappointment at Sun Xiu's refusal — including a remark that perhaps he should choose another emperor — and Zhang Bu reported Sun Chen's complaints to Sun Xiu. Sun Xiu became concerned about Sun Chen, but continued to outwardly show favour to Sun Chen. Sun Chen became concerned about his standing with the emperor and offered to leave the capital Jianye (present-day Nanjing) to head up the defence of the secondary capital Wuchang (in present-day Ezhou, Hubei). Sun Xiu approved.

However, Sun Xiu then became concerned that Sun Chen would take over that city and rebel. He conspired with Zhang Bu and the senior general Ding Feng to kill Sun Chen during the Laba Festival. The plot was leaked, but Sun Chen, even though apprehensive, was unable to decline the messengers Sun Xiu sent to invite him. Sun Chen showed up at the festival anyway, planning to leave under the excuse that his mansion had caught fire if necessary. But he was seized by Ding Feng and Zhang Bu's soldiers before he could leave. Sun Chen begged Sun Xiu for his life, offering to be exiled to Jiao Province (present-day northern Vietnam) or to become a slave, but Sun Xiu declined — stating to Sun Chen that he did not give Teng Yin or Lü Ju those choices. Sun Chen was executed, along with members of his clan. Furthermore, Sun Xiu felt so ashamed to share the clan of Sun Jun and Sun Chen that he had them posthumously banished from the Sun family, referring them as Gu Jun (故峻) and Gu Chen (故綝) instead.

== See also ==
- Lists of people of the Three Kingdoms
