= Sun Kuang =

Younger brother of Sun Quan, founding emperor of the state of Eastern Wu

Sun Kuang 孫匡
- Born: between 184 and 191
- Died: Unknown (Note: Since Sun Kuang's birth year is between 184 and 191, and lived to his early 20s, his death date should be before 210.)
- Other name: Jizuo (季佐)
- Spouse: Lady Cao
- Children: Sun Tai
- Parents: Sun Jian (father); Empress Wulie (mother)
- Relatives: See Eastern Wu family trees

Sun Kuang (after 184 (Note: While Sun Kuang's birth year was not recorded, he was younger than his brother Sun Yi, who was born in 184.) – before 210?), courtesy name Jizuo, was a younger brother of Sun Quan, a Chinese warlord who lived during the late Eastern Han dynasty and later became the founding emperor of the Eastern Wu dynasty during the Three Kingdoms period.

== Life ==
Sun Kuang was the fourth and youngest son of the warlord Sun Jian and his wife Lady Wu. Little is known about his life. When he was around the age of 19, he was nominated as a xiaolian and maocai (茂才) to join the civil service. However, he never held any offices and died in his early 20s.

Sun Jian was killed in action at the Battle of Xiangyang in 191 and was succeeded by his eldest son, Sun Ce. The Wei Shu recorded that Sun Ce, who should rightfully inherit his father's title "Marquis of Wucheng" (烏程侯), declined to accept the title and offered it to Sun Kuang instead. Between 194 and 199, Sun Ce embarked on a series of conquests in the Jiangdong region and established his power base there. Around the time, the warlord Cao Cao, who controlled the Han central government and the figurehead Han ruler, Emperor Xian, became wary of Sun Ce's growing influence in the south, so he sought to establish marital ties with Sun. Cao Cao's son, Cao Zhang, married a daughter of Sun Ben, a cousin of Sun Ce, while Cao Cao's niece married Sun Kuang.

== Discrepancies in historical records ==
The Jiang Biao Zhuan recorded that Sun Kuang served under his second brother, Sun Quan (Sun Ce's successor), as General of the Household Who Solidifies Martial Might (定武中郎將). He fought in the Wu army at the Battle of Dongkou of 222–223 against Wei invading forces commanded by Cao Xiu. During the battle, he ordered the Wu general Lü Fan to set fire, but accidentally destroyed a large portion of the Wu army's supplies, resulting in a shortage. Lü Fan immediately sent Sun Kuang back to the Wu capital. Sun Quan was furious with his younger brother and he punished his brother by forcing him to change his family name to "Ding" (丁) and placing him under permanent house arrest.

Pei Songzhi, who annotated Sun Kuang's biography in the Sanguozhi, commented that the Jiang Biao Zhuan account contradicted the original claim in the Sanguozhi that Sun Kuang did not hold any offices before his death because the Jiang Biao Zhuan stated that Sun Kuang was appointed as a general. Besides, the Battle of Dongkou took place in 222–223, about 31 years after Sun Jian's death, so if Sun Kuang died in his early 20s (as mentioned in the Sanguozhi), he could not have possibly lived until 222. Pei believed that the "Sun Kuang" mentioned in the Jiang Biao Zhuan was actually Sun Lang, a younger half-brother of Sun Kuang, after he compared the Jiang Biao Zhuan account with records from the San Chao Lu and the Zhilin.

== Family and descendants ==
Sun Kuang's son, Sun Tai (孫泰), was born to Cao Cao's niece (whom Sun Kuang married), and served as a Colonel of Changshui (長水校尉) under his uncle, Sun Quan. In 234, he participated in the Battle of Hefei against Wu's rival state Wei, but was killed by a stray arrow in the midst of battle.

Sun Tai's son, Sun Xiu (孫秀), (Note: He should not be confused with Sima Lun's confidant of the same name.) served as General of the Vanguard (前將軍) and Area Commander of Xiakou (夏口督) during the reign of the fourth and last Wu emperor, Sun Hao (a grandson of Sun Quan). Sun Hao considered Sun Xiu a threat because Sun Xiu was a member of the imperial clan and wielded military power. In October 270 or c.January 271, Sun Hao sent an officer, He Ding (何定), to lead 5,000 troops to Xiakou for a hunting expedition. Sun Xiu suspected that Sun Hao had sent He Ding to Xiakou to kill him, so he brought along his family and bodyguards, numbering a few hundred people in total, and defected to Wu's rival state, the Jin dynasty. The Jin emperor Sima Yan received Sun Xiu warmly and appointed him as General of Agile Cavalry (驃騎將軍) and enfeoffed him as the Duke of Kuaiji (會稽公). (Note: A New Account of the Tales of the World also recorded that Emperor Wu married a maternal aunt's daughter, Lady Kuai, to Sun. Sun Sheng's Jin Yang Qiu recorded that Lady Kuai was the daughter of Kuai Jun, son of Kuai Liang. However, the term yimei is ambiguous as it can also mean "wife's younger sister".) Sun Hao was furious with Sun Xiu's betrayal so he banished him from the Sun clan and announced that Sun Xiu had changed his family name to "Li" (厲). In 280, Sun Hao surrendered to invading forces from Jin, bringing an end to the Wu regime. Many Jin officials went to congratulate Sima Yan, but Sun Xiu claimed that he was ill and remained at home. He faced his native land in the south and lamented the fall of Wu. The Jin imperial court praised him for that. After the fall of Wu, Sun Xiu was demoted from General of Agile Cavalry to General Who Calms Waves (伏波將軍) but was still allowed to have his own administrative office; one of his subordinates was Tao Kan. Sun Xiu was also present when Zhou Chu met his end. Sun Xiu died sometime in the Yongning era (301–303) of the reign of Emperor Hui (Sima Yan's son and successor). Sun Xiu's son, Sun Jian (孫儉), continued serving in the Jin government as an Official Who Concurrently Serves in the Palace (給事中). One of Sun Xiu's great-grandsons was Sun Gui.

== See also ==
- Lists of people of the Three Kingdoms
