= Lü Fan =

Military general serving warlord Sun Quan (died 228)

- 呂範

Grand Marshal (大司馬)
- In office 228
- Monarch: Sun Quan
- Chancellor: Gu Yong

Governor of Yang Province (揚州牧)
- In office 223 – 228
- Monarch: Sun Quan
- Chancellor: Sun Shao (222–225); Gu Yong (from 225)

General of the Vanguard (前將軍)
- In office 222 or earlier – 228
- Monarch: Sun Quan
- Chancellor: Sun Shao (222–225); Gu Yong (from 225)

Administrator of Danyang (丹楊太守)
- In office 220 – 222 or earlier

General Who Establishes Might (建威將軍)
- In office 220 – 222 or earlier

General Who Pacifies the South (平南將軍)
- In office ? – 220

Administrator of Pengze (彭澤太守)
- In office 209 – ?

Personal details
- Born: Unknown Taihe County, Anhui
- Died: 228
- Spouse: Lady Liu
- Children: unnamed first son; Lü Ju
- Occupation: Military general, politician
- Courtesy name: Ziheng (子衡)
- Peerage: Marquis of Nanchang (南昌侯)

Lü Fan (died 228), courtesy name Ziheng, was a Chinese military general and politician serving under the warlord Sun Quan during the late Eastern Han dynasty of China. He continued serving in the state of Eastern Wu during the early Three Kingdoms period.

== Early life ==
Lü Fan was from Xiyang County (細陽縣), Runan Commandery (汝南郡), which is around present-day Taihe County, Anhui. He married a woman from a certain Liu family. He started his career as a minor official under the warlord Yuan Shu. During this time, he met Sun Ce, a general under Yuan Shu, and became close friends with him. Since then, he had accompanied Sun Ce on the battles he fought under Yuan Shu's banner, and later in the battles that Sun Ce fought as a warlord in his own right.

It is said that Lü Fan recommended himself to Sun Ce through a game of weiqi – after Sun Ce made a bad opening move, Lü Fan capitalised on it and pointed out the mistake. Sun Ce was suitably impressed and offered Lü Fan a post. Rather than accept a high and lofty position, however, Lü Fan insisted upon remaining in a low one where he could more effectively manage troops. Sun Ce was further impressed and since then the two became inseparable. The game of weiqi in question, called the "Sun-Lü Game", is purported to be the first weiqi game to be recorded move for move, but many scholars doubt its authenticity. After this, Lü Fan was appointed as a Chief Controller.

== Career under Sun Ce ==
At one point during the beginning of Sun Ce's career as a warlord, he sent Lü Fan to fetch his family from Guangling Commandery in Xu Province to his new base in Qu'e County. Tao Qian, the Governor of Xu Province, despised Sun Ce and wanted to have Lü Fan arrested as a spy and tortured, but some of his retainers freed Lü Fan and helped him escape from Guangling Commandery with Sun Ce's family. Sun Ce trusted Lü Fan so highly that he treated him like a member of the Sun family and even allowed Lü Fan to dine in the presence of his mother, Lady Wu.

Lü Fan was third only to Cheng Pu and Xu Kun (Note: father of Lady Xu and son of Sun Ce's aunt Lady Sun) in terms of merit, having followed Sun Ce in his conquests in the Jiangdong region from 194 to 199. His unit defeated and killed Yan Baihu's subordinate, Chen Mu. However, Lü Fan was concerned about the quality of Sun Ce's army. He feared that though their forces had grown, it comprised mostly untrained rabble with just a few veterans supporting them. Lü Fan believed that such an army could achieve limited success at best. As such, he requested that Sun Ce transfer him to his personal staff and make him the commander of his forces. At the time, a marshal was simply a minor staff officer responsible for training and drilling the troops. As he saw that this was a demotion for Lü Fan, Sun Ce tried to talk Lü Fan out of it, but the latter insisted and managed to convince Sun Ce to agree to his request. Lü Fan thus took charge of training Sun Ce's troops. As Sun Ce was the supreme commander of the military forces in the Jiangdong region, Lü Fan's authority extended to the units under the command of Sun Ce's subordinates, effectively giving him control over the entire military administration in Jiangdong.

In 197, when Yuan Shu declared himself emperor – an act deemed treasonous against the figurehead Emperor Xian of the Han dynasty – Sun Ce broke ties with Yuan Shu and joined other warlords in a two-year-long campaign against the pretender. Chen Yu, who was sent by the warlord Cao Cao to assist Sun Ce in the campaign against Yuan Shu, secretly plotted to destroy Sun Ce from within. However, Sun Ce sensed Chen Yu's intentions and sent Lü Fan to deal with him. Lü Fan defeated Chen Yu in battle and forced him to retreat north.

Around 199, after defeating Yuan Shu's remnants, the minor warlord Liu Xun, as well as Huang Zu and Liu Biao at the Battle of Sha County, Sun Ce wrote a memorial to the Han central government to recommend Lü Fan to be the Administrator of Guiyang Commandery, among other things.

== Career under Sun Quan ==
Following Sun Ce's death in the year 200, his younger brother Sun Quan succeeded him and took control over his territories and forces in the Jiangdong region. In 208, the warlord Cao Cao, who controlled the Han central government, led a massive army to attack his rivals, Liu Bei and Sun Quan, in southern China. Sun Quan heeded the advice of Zhou Yu and Lu Su, and decided to ally with Liu Bei against Cao Cao. Lü Fan participated in the Battle of Red Cliffs in the winter of 208–209 under Zhou Yu's command; the allied forces of Sun Quan and Liu Bei defeated Cao Cao's larger army in this decisive battle. After the victory at Red Cliffs, Liu Bei visited Sun Quan at his capital. While he was there, Lu Fan secretly advised Sun Quan to have Liu Bei keep as an hostage however Sun Quan refused.

Lü Fan continued serving under Sun Quan after the end of the Eastern Han dynasty in 220. Although Sun Quan initially agreed to be a vassal king under the Cao Wei state (established by Cao Cao's successor Cao Pi), he broke ties with Cao Pi and declared independence in 222 as the ruler of his own Eastern Wu regime.

In 223, Lü Fan led the Wu forces during the Battle of Dongkou against Wei forces led by Cao Xiu and Zang Ba. The situation was highly unfavourable for Wu at the beginning: the Wu fleet came under heavy attack and much of the fleet was destroyed in a storm. To add on to their troubles, Sun Lang, a younger half-brother of Sun Quan, accidentally burnt down the Wu forces' supply of food and weaponry. However, due to the efforts of Lü Fan's subordinates Sun Shao and Xu Sheng, the Wu forces were able to stage a counterattack and barely win the battle.

After the Battle of Dongkou, Sun Quan appointed Lü Fan as the Governor of Yang Province. In 228, he further promoted Lü Fan to the position of Grand Marshal, but Lü Fan, who was already critically ill then, died of illness before assuming his new appointment. Sun Quan wept bitterly upon learning of Lü Fan's death and called his courtesy name repeatedly; he also ordered the use of tailao rites to honor Lü.

== Appraisal ==
Lü Fan was said to be friendly and having a majestic appearance. Men who were put in charge of whole provinces such as Lu Xun and Quan Cong would show reverence towards him. At the time, his expenditure for his house and clothes were extravagant yet he was still diligent in his duties. Therefore Sun Quan was pleased by his merits and wasn't bothered by his excessive spending.

Like his brother before him, Sun Quan highly trusted Lü Fan even though they previously had some disagreements – Sun Quan, being young and foolhardy, often embezzled official funds for his personal interests and expected Lü Fan to cover up for him. Lü Fan, however, remained honest and reported Sun Quan's behaviour to Sun Ce, causing Sun Quan to dislike him. Nevertheless, as Sun Quan grew older and became more mature, he started to see Lü Fan in a different light and admired his honesty.

== Family ==
Lü Fan had at least two sons. The elder one, whose name is not recorded in history, died early. The younger one, Lü Ju, inherited his father's marquis title and rose through the ranks to become General of Agile Cavalry (驃騎將軍) during the reign of the second Wu emperor, Sun Liang.

== See also ==
- Lists of people of the Three Kingdoms
