= Lady Xie =

First wife of Sun Quan of Eastern Wu

Lady Xie 謝夫人
- Born: Unknown; Shaoxing, Zhejiang
- Died: Unknown
- Spouse: Sun Quan
- Father: Xie Jiong

Lady Xie was of a noted Kuaiji family and the first wife of Sun Quan, the founding emperor of the state of Eastern Wu during the Three Kingdoms period of China. Despite her fall from favour and early death, her family would continue to prosper at court.

== Life ==
Lady Xie was from Shanyin County (山陰縣), Kuaiji Commandery, which is in present-day Shaoxing, Zhejiang. She became Sun Quan's wife on the recommendation of Sun Quan's mother, Lady Wu, tying the Sun's to a noted southern clan. She was favoured by Sun Quan but later Sun Quan wanted to take his cousin Xu Kun's daughter Lady Xu as his new wife, so he told Lady Xie to lower herself to accept the newcomer. However, Lady Xie refused and fell out of Sun Quan's favour as a consequence. She died seemingly soon after at a relatively young age, supposedly of grief.

== Family and relatives ==
Lady Xie's father, Xie Jiong (謝煚) sometimes called Xie Ying (謝嬰) served as a Gentleman of Writing (尚書郎) and the Prefect (令) of Xu County (徐縣) in the Eastern Han dynasty. Xie Jiong was known for his good moral conduct and brilliance since he was young. The material he collected from the imperial archives when serving at the Secretariat in the Han capital may have been used by his son Cheng for his history on the Han.

Xie Jiong's younger brother, Xie Zhen (謝貞), was known for being very law-abiding, studious, and morally upright in conduct. He was nominated as a xiaolian (civil service candidate) and later served as the Chief (長) of Jianchang County (建昌縣). He died in office.

Lady Xie had a younger brother, Xie Cheng who would later serve at court as an official and a historian more than ten years after her death. Xie Cheng's son, Xie Chong (謝崇), served as General Who Spreads Might (揚威將軍). Xie Chong's younger brother, Xie Xu (謝勗), served as the Administrator (太守) of Wu Commandery with both gaining renown.

== See also ==
- Eastern Wu family trees#Sun Quan
- Lists of people of the Three Kingdoms
