= Campaign against Yuan Shu =

Conflict between Han government and warlord Yuan Shu (197-199)

- Part of the wars at the end of the Han dynasty
| Date | Early 197 – summer 199 CE |
| Location | Region south of the Huai River, China |
| Result | Han victory, Zhong dynasty collapses |

Belligerents
| Han dynasty | Zhong dynasty Shanyue |

Commanders and leaders
| Cao Cao; Liu Bei; Lü Bu (197); Defectors from Zhong: Sun Ce (197–199); Wu Jing (197–199); Sun Ben (197–199); Lei Bo; Chen Lan | Yuan Shu; Yuan Tan (199); Yuan Shao (199); Zu Lang (surrendered); Sun Ce (early 197); Wu Jing (early 197); Sun Ben (early 197); Defectors from Han: Lü Bu (198–199) (executed) |

Campaign against Yuan Shu
- Traditional Chinese: 袁術討伐戰
- Simplified Chinese: 袁术讨伐战
Transcriptions
Standard Mandarin
- Hanyu Pinyin: Yuán Shù Tǎofá Zhàn

The campaign against Yuan Shu was a punitive expedition that took place between 197 and 199 in the late Eastern Han dynasty. The campaign was initiated by the Han government against warlord Yuan Shu after Yuan declared himself emperor of the new Zhong dynasty, an act perceived as treason against Emperor Xian, the nominal Han ruler. The campaign concluded with the defeat of Yuan Shu and collapse of his self-established Zhong dynasty.

== Background ==
=== Early rule in Nanyang and Chenliu ===
The Imperial Seal, a symbol of the Emperor's authority, was lost in Luoyang when Dong Zhuo ravaged the city on 4 April 190. Sun Jian, a member of the coalition against Dong Zhuo, found the Imperial Seal by chance in the ruins of Luoyang and kept it for himself. Sun Jian was a general under Yuan Shu at this time, so when Yuan heard that Sun had acquired the Seal, he held Sun's wife hostage and forced Sun to pass the Seal to him.

Yuan Shu had previously set up his headquarters in Nanyang in 189, but after losing the Battle of Xiangyang (191) in which his best general Sun Jian was killed, he withdrew to Chenliu in the east, and began expanding his influence in Yang Province in 192. Suffering heavy defeats at the hands of Yuan Shao and Cao Cao, Yuan Shu was forced to flee, and relocated his base to Shouchun in Jiujiang (present-day Shou County, Anhui) on the southern bank of the Huai River.

=== Rise in Shouchun ===
From 193 on, Sun Jian's son and successor Sun Ce started conquering territories in Jiangdong (belonging to Liu Yao) on Yuan Shu's behalf. These achievements made Yuan one of the most powerful warlords in China, as long as Sun Ce and his other officers remained loyal to him. Yuan was less successful in expanding his rule in Xu Province, where he fought against Liu Bei and Lü Bu; the latter briefly allied himself to Yuan Shu in 196, but betrayed him again and drove him back to Shouchun.

Still, Yuan Shu perceived his control over southern China as secure. Hearing that Cao Cao had taken Han emperor Xian under his protection/control in autumn 196 and brought him to Xu city, Yuan Shu felt it was time to make his move. In early 197, he hurriedly declared himself a "Son of Heaven" (i.e. Emperor), starting a new Zhong (仲) dynasty in Huainan. Yuan Shu's action received no support and was universally viewed as treason against the Han emperor, causing Sun Ce to break ties with him. Other warlords now had a strong reason to attack his regime, and declared him a rebel. The imperial court, under Cao Cao's control, issued edicts to Sun Ce and Lü Bu, urging them to take aggressive action against Yuan Shu. Sun Ce allied himself to Cao Cao, but remained independent.

== The campaign ==
=== First stage ===
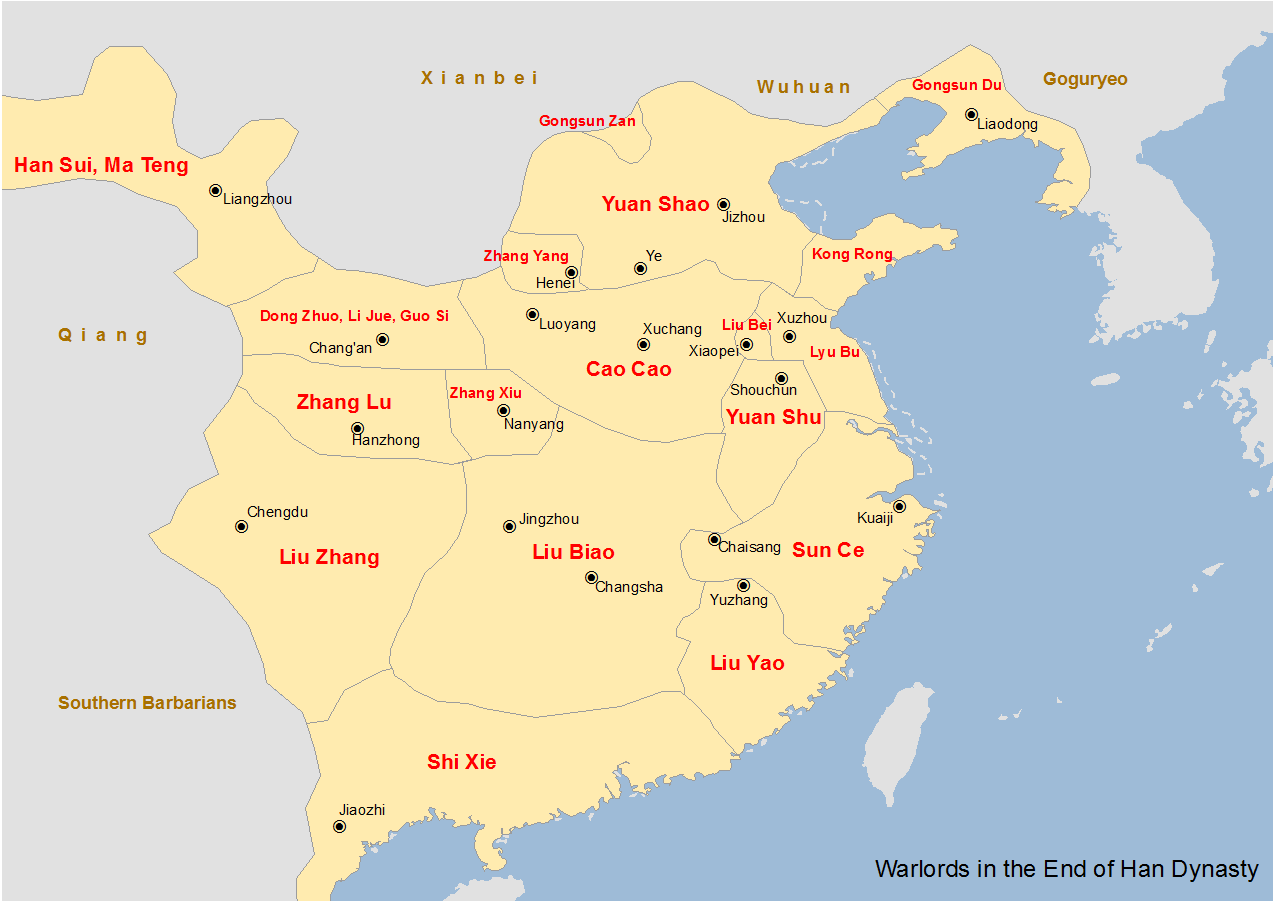
Map showing the major warlords of the late Han dynasty in the 190s

Upon receiving news that Yuan Shu had declared himself a "Son of Heaven", Sun Ce sent letters to his uncle Wu Jing and cousin Sun Ben, who both served under Yuan Shu, as an administrator and general, respectively, asking them to sever relations with him. Both Wu Jing and Sun Ben responded to Sun Ce's call and defected to him. As a consequence, Yuan Shu lost Guangling and the territories conquered by Sun Ce in Jiangdong, dramatically reducing his influence in southern China. Meanwhile, Lü Bu defeated Yuan Shu's forces at the north of the Huai River and pillaged the area. In an effort to turn the tide, Yuan Shu sent an army to invade Chen, but was defeated by Han forces led by Cao Cao. In the autumn of 197, Cao Cao seized all Yuan Shu's holdings north of the Huai River, while the latter's remaining territory suffered drought and a bad harvest, further decreasing his power.

=== Lü Bu's defection and defeat ===
When Yuan Shu's influence had been reduced to a minimum, internal conflict arose among the members of the alliance formed against him. Lü Bu, upon request from Yuan Shu, attacked Liu Bei, who received support from Cao Cao to fight back. The conflict led to the Battle of Xiapi in 198, fought between the allied forces of Cao Cao and Liu Bei against Lü Bu. Facing a dire situation, Lü Bu turned to Yuan Shu for aid. Yuan Shu sent only about 1,000 cavalry to reinforce Lü Bu, but the force was defeated before it reached Xiapi. As Lü Bu's downfall seemed inevitable, Yuan Shu sent messengers to incite the Shanyue tribes and bandit leader Zu Lang (祖郎) to attack Sun Ce. Sun Ce defeated the enemy and continued to strengthen his influence in Jiangdong. Lü Bu finally surrendered and was executed by Cao Cao on 7 February 199. (Note: The Zizhi Tongjian recorded that Lü Bu surrendered to Cao Cao on the guiyou day of the 12th month of the 3rd year of the Jian'an era of the reign of Emperor Xian of Han. He was executed on the same day. This date corresponds to 7 February 199 in the Gregorian calendar.)

=== End of the Zhong emperor ===
On the other hand, Yuan Shu was faring badly; his treasury was empty and his military was too weak to resist an invasion or suppress a rebellion. As a result, Yuan Shu opted to incinerate his palace complexes and escape to the Qian hills, where two of his former followers, Lei Bo (雷薄) and Chen Lan (陳蘭), were currently hiding. However, Lei Bo and Chen Lan refused to accept Yuan Shu, so Yuan Shu wrote to his clansman Yuan Shao, promising to give Yuan Shao the Imperial Seal if the latter would help him. In response, Yuan Shao dispatched his son, Yuan Tan, to escort Yuan Shu to Qing Province (covering present-day Shandong). Cao Cao sent Liu Bei and Zhu Ling to intercept Yuan Shu while Yuan was en route to Qing Province, so Yuan had no choice but to turn back to Huainan. Yuan Shu eventually died of illness in the sixth month of 199 on the way back to his capital Shouchun.

== Aftermath ==
Yuan Shu's family went to rely on Yuan Shu's former follower Liu Xun, while his other followers Yang Hong (楊弘) and Zhang Xun (張勳) planned to surrender to Sun Ce, but Liu Xun had them captured and held in Lujiang. In 199, Sun Ce defeated Liu Xun and conquered Lujiang, freeing Yuan Shu's family and men.

Meanwhile, existing tensions between Cao Cao and Yuan Shao would increase over the next few months and by the end of 199, it seemed that a conflict between them was inevitable. It would ultimately come to a head the following September, during the Battle of Guandu.

== In popular culture ==
The campaign is featured in the sixth, seventh and ninth installments of the video game series Dynasty Warriors produced by Koei.
