= Sun Jing =

Late 2nd/early 3rd century Han Dynasty general

- 孫靜

General of the Household of Illustrious Righteousness (昭義中郎將)
- In office c. 200–?

Colonel of Vehement Martial Might (奮武校尉)
- In office c. 196 – c. 200

Personal details
- Born: Unknown Fuyang District, Hangzhou, Zhejiang
- Died: Unknown
- Relations: See Eastern Wu family trees
- Children: Sun Gao; Sun Yu; Sun Jiao; Sun Huan; Sun Qian
- Parent: Sun Zhong (father)
- Occupation: General
- Courtesy name: Youtai (幼臺)

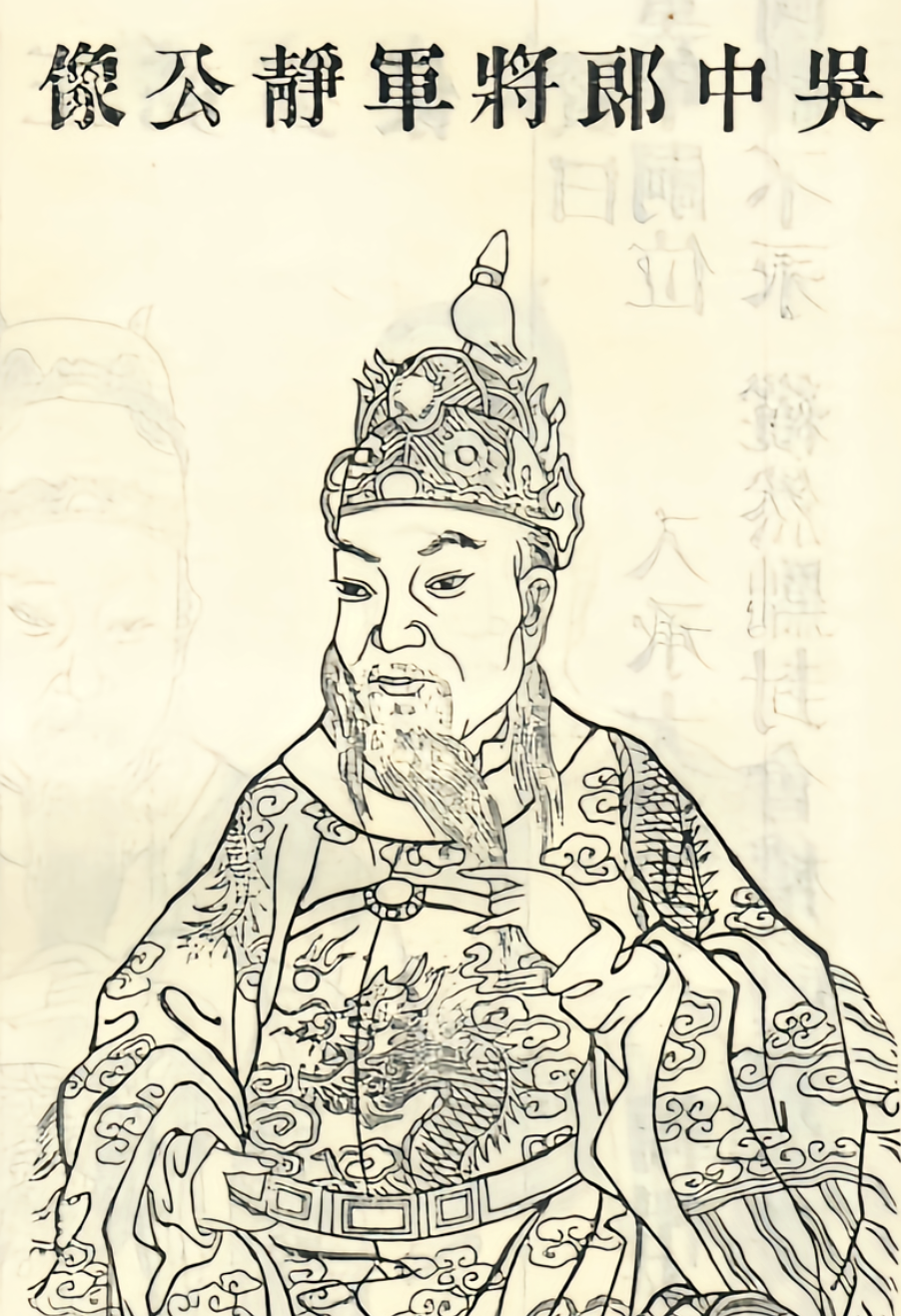
Portrait of Sun Jing of the Later Han Dynasty. From The Genealogy of the Sun Clan of Yuyao, Zhejiang.

Sun Jing (fl. 170 – 200s), courtesy name Youtai, was the younger brother of the general Sun Jian, who lived during the late Eastern Han dynasty of China. Provided the core of Sun Jian's army and he would help Sun Ce, Sun Jian's son and warlord, in conquest while he also took rank under Sun Quan, Sun Ce's younger brother and successor. However, he had limited active involvement in politics or military matters, as he remained in his home area to look after family interests in their home area. One of his children would make a play to rule, while other sons would serve with distinction under Sun Quan.

== Early life and service to Sun Jian ==
Sun Jing was from Fuchun County, Wu Commandery, which is around present-day Fuyang District, Hangzhou, Zhejiang. In 184, Sun Jian was tasked with raising troops to fight the Yellow Turban Rebellion, gathering a thousand men from Xiapi and between the Huan and Si Rivers before joining with Zhu Jun. Sun Jing raised 500-600 men from Wu Commandery, providing a sizeable portion of Sun Jian's force. Sun Jing's soldiers would provide the bodyguard and core of Sun Jian's army. We don't know what role Sun Jing had in the campaigns that his older brother fought in, for the Eastern Han against rebels and then for the warlord Yuan Shu as it was difficult for Wu historians to later reconstruct careers of officers during Sun Jian's time. It isn't entirely clear when Sun Jing left and returned to Fuchun, but Rafe De Crespigny suggests it was when Sun Jian was killed at the Battle of Xiangyang in 191.

== Aid to Sun Ce ==
In 196, Sun Ce who had conquered Wu and half of Danyang focused his attention on Kuaiji which was under Wang Lang who had been there some time. As Sun Ce marched through Wu, he requested that Sun Jing assist him, so Sun Jing led household forces to Qiantang. Wang Lang had established his primary defences at the city of Guling to hold the Qiangtang River and saw off Sun Ce's repeated attempts to establish a bridgehead. Sun Jing was able to use his local knowledge to propose a solution against the well entrenched Wang Lang. Zhadu was a dozen or so kilometres south of Guling, another strategic point at the river, going there would allow them to come behind Wang Lang from the north, attacking where Wang Lang was not expecting it. Sun Ce accepted the proposal and had extra campfires lit to disguise the fact that some soldiers were departing in the night Sun Jing and Sun Ce reached Zhadu and attacked Wang Lang's camp at Gaoqian. With Wang Lang taken by surprise, this gave Sun Ce's army a bridgehead, Wang Lang sent his ally Zhou Xin sent to oppose the Sun forces in their new position, but he killed in combat and Wang Lang fled.

Sun Ce made his uncle Colonel of Vehement Martial Might (奮武校尉) and wanted to give him important responsibilities, but Sun Jing refused. Instead, he requested that he be assigned to their family home at Fuchuan, to tend to the family tombs and property, to defend the towns and villages he had grown up among. Sun Ce agreed, so Sun Jing led his household troops back to Wu Commandery and spent the remainder of his life there.

== Death and sons ==
In 200, Sun Ce was assassinated and, as he lay dying, he chose his younger brother Sun Quan as successor. However, others considered their options and Jing's eldest son the General of the Household Who Settles Firmness (定武中郎將) Sun Gao (孫暠) was older than both Sun Ce and Sun Quan. In charge of the garrison at Wucheng, he organized troops, which led to suspicions he was aiming for Kuaiji but Yu Fan ensured the area was well-prepared and warned Sun Gao off, declaring the officials would remain loyal. Sun Gao withdrew with his soldiers, his career seems to have ended, and he was likely forced back to his home.

Despite all this, Sun Quan appointed Sun Jing to General of the Household of Illustrious Righteousness (昭義中郎將) but as before, Sun Jing remained in his home area and took up no official duties. Sun Jing's year of death is not properly recorded, though Rafe De Crespigny suggests he didn't live long after Sun Quan came to power, but his title was passed on to his heirs, and his family remained of import. Sun Jing was survived by his five sons: the disgraced Sun Gao, Sun Yu, Sun Jiao, Sun Huan and Sun Qian. His grandsons Sun Jun and Sun Chen would become powerful regents in the dynasty after Sun Quan's death.

== In Romance of the Three Kingdoms ==
The 14th century novel Romance of the Three Kingdoms by Luo Guanzhong has Sun Jian independent of Yuan Shu and a warlord in his own right rather than a subordinate general. He allied with Yuan Shu to attack Liu Biao and as he prepared to leave, Sun Jing gathered Jian's family to protest, arguing that the south was at peace and no need to attack another over an insult. Sun Jian was ambitious for more than the south and goes, he was killed in the ensuing campaign.

He helped Sun Ce against Wang Lang, suggesting they attack the supply depot which Wang Lang would not expect, a plan Sun Ce was delighted with. Wang Lang grew suspicious and pursued but was destroyed by Sun Ce's ambush, Sun Jing was ordered to garrison the eastern lands in the south. When Sun Ce died, oversaw the burial of the young warlord on the orders of Zhang Zhao.

== See also ==
- Lists of people of the Three Kingdoms
