= Xie Cheng =

Historian from Eastern Wu (182–254 CE)

- 謝承

Administrator of Wuling Commandery (武陵郡太守)
- In office 219 or after – ?

Commandant of East Changsha (長沙東部都尉)
- In office 215 or after – 219

Gentleman for All Purposes (五官郎中)
- In office c. 210 – ?

Personal details
- Born: 182 Shaoxing, Zhejiang
- Died: 254
- Parent: Xie Jiong (father)
- Occupation: Official
- Courtesy name: Weiping (偉平)

Xie Cheng (182–254), courtesy name Weiping, was an in-law to the warlord, then Emperor of Eastern Wu, Sun Quan. Xie served in Jing province after Sun Quan's conquests there and was a noted historian whose work is still used.

== Life ==
Xie Cheng was from Shanyin County (山陰縣), Kuaiji Commandery, which is in present-day Shaoxing, Zhejiang. It would take more than a decade after the death of his sister Lady Xie to be appointed at court, when he was made a Gentleman for All Purposes (五官郎中) around 210. After the Sun-Liu territorial dispute in Jing was settled in 215, Xie Cheng was promoted to the positions of Commandant of East Changsha (長沙東部都尉) then after Lü Meng's 219 conquest of Jing, became the Administrator (太守) of Wuling Commandery (武陵郡). Xie Cheng was known for being very well-read and for his excellent memory, never forgetting what he learned.

== Historian ==
Xie Cheng became a historian; his works include a notable example of the trend in the era for regional histories with his "Kuaiji xianxian zhuan" (会稽先贤传, "Biographies of the Former Worthies of Kuaiji").

As part of Wu's claim to being successor of the Han and perhaps drawing on the material collected by his father, he also wrote over 100 volumes of the Hou Han Shu (後漢書), (Note: Note that this Hou Han Shu written by Xie Cheng was not the same as the Hou Han Shu (Book of the Later Han) by Fan Ye. There were 130 volumes in Xie Cheng's Hou Han Shu, but all except eight had been lost over the course of history.) which documented the history of the Eastern Han dynasty, it survived intact till Tang times though only fragments survive. It is considered by Rafe de Crespigny as an important source on the Later Han.

His works are used by Pei Songzhi as part of the annotations to the Sanguozhi, providing accounts of Humu Ban's fate at the hands of Wang Kuang, an account of Wang Kuang, Zhao Yu's life, Wu Fu's failed assassination of Dong Zhuo, a mini biography of Lu Kang among other details, including accounts of fathers or male ancestors of famous officials like Lu Ji, Zhou Yu, Zang Hong. It is also used by Fan Ye's Hou Han Shu, Sima Guang in the Zizhi Tongjian, Han Bielenstein in Lo-yang and the Bureaucracy of Han Times, regularly cited in Rafe De Crespigny's commentary on the Tongjian and as a source by Richard B.Mather.

However, not all his work is without controversy. De Crespigny raises questions about coverage of Wang Kuang's death and account of Humu Ban. His account of Cai Yong and Wang Yun's conversation before Cai Yong's death, though accepted by Sima Guang and Michael Loewe, was dismissed by Pei Songzhi as absurd and false while De Crespigny noted it as strange.

== Family ==
Cheng's father, Xie Jiong (謝煚) (sometimes written as "Xie Ying" (謝嬰)) served as a Gentleman of Writing (尚書郎) and the Prefect (令) of Xu County (徐縣) in the Eastern Han dynasty. Xie Jiong was known for his good moral conduct and brilliance since he was young. The material he collected from the imperial archives when serving at the Secretariat in the Han capital may have been used by Cheng for his history on the Han. Cheng's uncle Xie Zhen (謝貞), was known for being very law-abiding, studious, and morally upright in conduct. He was nominated as a xiaolian (civil service candidate) and later served as the Chief (長) of Jianchang County (建昌縣). He died in office.

Xie Cheng's older sister Lady Xie became wife of Sun Quan, the future founding Emperor of Eastern Wu and was initially greatly favoured. But when he wished to have a new wife as her superior, she refused and she died young. Despite her death, her family would continue to serve the Sun regime.

Cheng's eldest son Xie Chong (謝崇), served as General Who Spreads Might (揚威將軍) and his youngest son, Xie Xu (謝勗), served as the Administrator (太守) of Wu Commandery with both gaining renown.

== See also ==
- Lists of people of the Three Kingdoms
