= Luo Tong =

Chinese official serving warlord Sun Quan (193–228)

- 駱統

Area Commander of Ruxu (濡須督)
- In office 223 – 228
- Monarch: Sun Quan

Lieutenant-General (偏將軍)
- In office 222 – 223
- Monarch: Sun Quan

Personal details
- Born: 193 (Note: Luo Tong's biography in the Sanguozhi recorded that he died in the 7th year of the Huangwu era (228) of Sun Quan's reign at the age of 36 (by East Asian age reckoning). By calculation, his birth year should be around 193.) Yiwu, Zhejiang
- Died: 228 (aged 35)
- Spouse: Lady Sun
- Parent: Luo Jun (father)
- Occupation: Official
- Courtesy name: Gongxu (公緒)
- Peerage: Marquis of Xinyang Village (新陽亭侯)

Luo Tong (193 CE–228 CE), courtesy name Gongxu, was an official serving under the warlord Sun Quan during the late Eastern Han dynasty and early Three Kingdoms period of China.

== Life ==
Luo Tong was from Wushang County (烏傷縣), Kuaiji Commandery, which is around present-day Yiwu, Zhejiang. His father Luo Jun (駱俊; died 197), who served the Prince of Chen Liu Chong as his chancellor (陳相) in the Eastern Han dynasty, was killed by the warlord Yuan Shu. Luo Tong's mother remarried after her husband's death, and became a concubine of the official Hua Xin. Luo Tong, who was seven years old then, returned to Kuaiji Commandery with his close friends. Before Luo Tong left his hometown, his mother tearfully bid him farewell. When the carriage driver told him that his mother was looking on from behind, Luo Tong did not turn around. When asked why, he said, "If I look back, my mother will only miss me more. I don't want to make her suffer." This story highlights Luo Tong's filial piety and respect for his family. It also shows his loyalty and determination, as he did not let his emotions cloud his duty.

At the time, there was a famine, so the residents in Luo Tong's hometown and other travellers taking shelter there suffered from hunger. Luo Tong was very worried about this and his appetite decreased. His elder sister, who was widowed and had no children, was known for being very kind. She saw that her brother looked very upset, so she asked him why. Luo Tong said, "I feel bad when I can fill my own stomach while those people don't have enough to eat." His sister replied, "You're right. Why do you suffer in silence and not tell me about this?" She then took grain from her personal stores and gave it to Luo Tong, and also informed their mother about it. Luo Tong's mother agreed with what they were doing, and she distributed grain to the people. Luo Tong became famous after this incident.

When the warlord Sun Quan was nominally serving as the Administrator (太守) of Kuaiji Commandery, Luo Tong, then 19 years old, was appointed as the Chancellor of Wucheng County (烏程縣; south of present-day Huzhou, Zhejiang), which had over 10,000 residents. He performed well in office and received praise from Sun Quan, who promoted him to an Officer of Merit (功曹) and acting Cavalry Commandant (騎都尉). He married the daughter of Sun Quan's cousin, Sun Fu. Luo Tong was known for being very diligent in examining the state of affairs in his jurisdiction. Whenever he encountered important issues that required action, he would attempt to resolve them within the day itself. He also advised Sun Quan to give greater attention to talented and virtuous people, so as to attract them to serve him. He suggested that Sun Quan meet the guests individually (instead of in groups) and hold private conversations with them to understand them better and make them feel appreciated and grateful to him. Sun Quan accepted Luo Tong's advice. Luo Tong was appointed as "General of the Household Who Builds Loyalty" (建忠中郎將) and was placed in charge of 3,000 troops. He was placed in command of Ling Tong's unit after Ling died.

At some point during his career, Luo Tong became aware of the hardships suffered by the common people. He noted that the population was plagued by contagious diseases, onerous taxes, and forced labor. He wrote a lengthy memorial to Sun Quan, the ruler of Eastern Wu, warning him that these problems could lead to instability and unrest if they were not addressed. Luo Tong's memorial demonstrated his concern for the welfare of the people and his understanding of the social and political issues of the time. He urged Sun Quan to implement policies to help the people and relieve their burdens. Sun Quan felt touched after reading Luo Tong's memorial and he paid greater attention to Luo's ideas. Throughout his career, Luo Tong had written many memorials to Sun Quan, giving appropriate advice on policies. Among all the pieces of advice he gave to Sun Quan, the most notable one is his suggestion to stop increasing conscription, because he felt that forcing the people into conscription would lead to social problems and make them feel resentful. Sun Quan argued with him again and again over this issue, but eventually accepted his ideas.

In 221–222 CE, Luo Tong participated in the Battle of Xiaoting between Eastern Wu and its former ally state, Shu Han. He was a subordinate of the Wu general Lu Xun, and the Wu forces emerged victorious in the battle. Luo Tong was promoted to Lieutenant-General (偏將軍) for his contributions. Later, in 222–223 CE, he participated in the Battle of Ruxu against Wu's rival state Cao Wei. The Wei general, Cao Ren had sent his subordinate Chang Diao (常雕) to attack Zhongzhou (中洲). Luo Tong and Yan Gui (嚴圭) led the Wu forces to Zhongzhou to resist the enemy and defeated them. For his success, Luo Tong was promoted to Area Commander of Ruxu (濡須督) and enfeoffed as the Marquis of Xinyang Village (新陽亭侯). He also spoke up for Zhang Wen when Zhang Wen was implicated in a scandal involving Ji Yan, but Sun Quan did not accept his advice.

Luo Tong died in 228 at the age of 36 (by East Asian age reckoning). He had a son, Luo Xiu (骆秀), who was killed in c.August 264 by pirates.

== Luo Jun ==
Luo Tong's father was Luo Jun (駱俊), whose courtesy name was Xiaoyuan (孝遠). Luo Jun was known for being skilful in handling both civil and military affairs. He served as a minor officer in his home commandery when he was young and was nominated as a xiaolian (civil service candidate). He was subsequently promoted to a Gentleman of Writing (尚書郎), and was later appointed as the Chancellor of Chen State, with Liu Chong as Prince of Chen. When chaos broke out towards the end of the Eastern Han dynasty, Luo Jun successfully maintained law and order within Chen State and ensured that the people lived well and were safe. Sometime in the 190s, when the warlord Yuan Shu was running short of supplies, he sent a messenger to Chen State to request for grain. Luo Jun saw Yuan Shu as a traitor and despised him, so he refused to send supplies. The angry Yuan Shu then sent assassins to kill Luo Jun. (Note: Luo Jun likely died around the same period as Prince Chong, who died in 197, per Emperor Xian's biography in Houhanshu.)

== Appraisal ==
Chen Shou, who wrote Luo Tong's biography in the Records of the Three Kingdoms, appraised Luo Tong as follows: "Luo Tong understood righteousness and provided rational advice. He was able to convince those in power."

== See also ==
- Lists of people of the Three Kingdoms
