= Zhu Zhi =

Eastern Han general (156-224)

- 朱治

General Who Pacifies the State (安國將軍)
- In office 223 – 224
- Monarch: Sun Quan

General Who Upholds Righteousness (扶義將軍) (under Sun Quan)
- In office 202 – 223
- Monarch: Emperor Xian of Han (until 220)

Administrator of Wu Commandery (吳郡太守) (under Sun Quan)
- In office 202 – 223
- Monarch: Emperor Xian of Han (until 220)

Commandant (都尉) (under Sun Jian)
- In office ?–?
- Monarch: Emperor Xian of Han

Major (司馬) (under Sun Jian)
- In office 188–?
- Monarch: Emperor Ling of Han

Personal details
- Born: 156; Anji County, Zhejiang
- Died: 224 (aged 68)
- Children: Zhu Cai; Zhu Ji; Zhu Wei; Zhu Wansui
- Relatives: Zhu Ran (maternal nephew); Lady Sun (daughter-in-law)
- Occupation: Military general, politician
- Courtesy name: Junli (君理)
- Peerage: Marquis of Piling (毗陵侯)

Zhu Zhi (156–224), courtesy name Junli, was a Chinese military general and politician serving under the warlord Sun Quan during the late Eastern Han dynasty and early Three Kingdoms period of China. He was from Guzhang County (故鄣縣), Danyang Commandery (丹楊郡), which is present-day Anji County, Zhejiang.

Zhu Zhi served Sun Jian (Sun Quan's father) early on and participated in the campaign against Dong Zhuo. Sun Jian was succeeded by his eldest son, Sun Ce, who became a vassal under another warlord Yuan Shu. After Sun Quan became the ruler of the Jiangdong territories, Zhu Zhi was appointed as the Administrator of Wu Commandery, a position he would retain for his entire life. He adopted his maternal nephew Zhu Ran as his son, as he had no heir. In 222, he was enfeoffed as the Marquis of Piling, and, in 223, was appointed General Who Pacifies the State (安國將軍). He died in 224.

== Life ==
Zhu Zhi served as a county clerk in his early career and was noted for his filial piety and modesty. He was soon made a prefecture official and followed Sun Jian on his rise to power. In 188, he was promoted to the rank of Major (司馬) and led an army to attack rival armies in Changsha, Lingling and Guiyang commanderies (all in present-day Hunan). Zhu Zhi was a skilled and successful tactician, and was promoted to the rank of Commandant (都尉) by Sun Jian because of his victories. He assisted in Sun Jian's defeat of Dong Zhuo in the Battle of Yangren, and upon the army's entrance into Luoyang was promoted to the rank of Colonel (校尉), with special command to lead a regiment of cavalry to Xu Province and reinforce its governor, Tao Qian, in the fight against the Yellow Turban rebels.

Following Sun Jian's death in 191, Zhu Zhi continued to serve under Sun Jian's successor, Sun Ce, who at the time was loyal to the northern warlord Yuan Shu. Upon learning that Yuan Shu was not a man of integrity or administrative ability, Zhu Zhi advised Sun Ce to return to their territory in Wu and operate independently. Around this time, the Grand Tutor Ma Midi gave Zhu Zhi bureaucrat status and promoted him to Administrator of Wu Commandery. Zhu Zhi displayed ability and talent in all his missions, including an instance of protecting Sun Ce's family members, and was widely lauded as Sun Ce conquered the entire lower Yangtze region.

Sun Ce was assassinated by a servant of Xu Gong in 200 for reasons that have long been debated. Zhu Zhi stayed in Wu and, along with the general Zhou Yu, served Sun Ce's successor, Sun Quan. In 202, Sun Quan appointed Zhu Zhi as the Administrator of Wu Commandery and promoted him to the rank of General Who Upholds Righteousness (扶義將軍). Sun Quan gave Zhu Zhi feudal land holdings in Gelou, Youzhang, Wuyi and Piling, allowed Zhu Zhi to enter semi-retirement.

Zhu Zhi continued to serve the Wu government: He participated in attacks against the Baiyue south and east of the Han Chinese-controlled territory of Wu, and 208 talked Sun Quan's cousin Sun Ben out of sending his son as a hostage to Cao Cao in an attempt to improve diplomatic relations. Zhu Zhi was loved and respected by Sun Quan, who, after becoming King of Wu, would always greet Zhu in person when he visited the capital, bestowing gifts upon him and holding banquets in his honor.

In 222, Zhu Zhi was enfeoffed as the Marquis of Piling (毗陵侯). Sun Quan bestowed kingly gifts on Zhu Zhi (such as a golden seal) and extended his marquisate to encompass four counties, but Zhu Zhi himself was unwilling to assume greater holdings or positions. He retired to his hometown in Guzhang County for several years and later died in 224.

Zhu Zhi had five sons: Zhu Ran (adopted), Zhu Cai, Zhu Ji, Zhu Wei and Zhu Wansui.

== See also ==
- Lists of people of the Three Kingdoms
