= Wu Jing (Han dynasty) =

Han dynasty general (died 203)

- 吳景

Administrator of Danyang (丹楊太守) (under Sun Ce, then Sun Quan)
- In office c. 190s – 203
- Monarch: Emperor Xian of Han
- Preceded by: Zhou Xin
- Succeeded by: Sun Yi

General Who Spreads Martial Might (揚武將軍) (under Sun Ce, then Sun Quan)
- In office c. 190s – 203
- Monarch: Emperor Xian of Han

Cavalry Commandant (騎都尉) (under Sun Jian)
- In office c. 190s–?
- Monarch: Emperor Xian of Han

Personal details
- Born: Unknown Suzhou, Jiangsu
- Died: 203
- Children: Wu Fen; Wu Qi
- Relatives: Empress Wulie (sister); Sun Jian (brother-in-law)
- Occupation: Military general, politician

Wu Jing (died 203) was a Chinese military general and politician of the Eastern Han dynasty of China. He was a brother-in-law of the minor warlord Sun Jian, whose son Sun Quan would found the Eastern Wu dynasty during the Three Kingdoms period.

== Life ==
Wu Jing was from Wu County, Wu Commandery (around present-day Suzhou, Jiangsu) but he grew up in Qiantang County (錢唐縣; present-day Hangzhou, Zhejiang). He was orphaned at a young age so he lived with his elder sister, Lady Wu. After Lady Wu married the general Sun Jian, Wu Jing became a subordinate of his brother-in-law. Wu Jing's father was Wu Hui (吴煇), who was Inspector of Chongzhou.

Wu Jing participated in some battles under Sun Jian's banner and was commissioned as a Cavalry Commandant (騎都尉) for his contributions. Sun Jian was killed in action at the Battle of Xiangyang in 191 against Liu Biao's forces. Sometime in the early 190s, Wu Jing was appointed by the warlord Yuan Shu as the Administrator (太守) of Danyang Commandery (丹楊郡; around present-day Xuancheng, Anhui), and was sent to attack and seize the commandery from its previous administrator, Zhou Xin. Wu Jing was at Qu'e County (曲阿縣; in present-day Danyang, Jiangsu) at the time and had not moved to Danyang yet. Sun Jian's eldest son, Sun Ce, brought along his family and followers, including Sun He (孫河) and Lü Fan, to join Wu Jing in Qu'e County. Wu Jing combined forces with his nephew to attack the bandits led by Zu Lang (祖郎) in Jing County and drove the bandits away.

Later, Wu Jing came under attack by the warlord Liu Yao, so he headed north to join Yuan Shu. Yuan Shu appointed him as General of the Household Who Inspects the Army (督軍中郎將) and ordered him and Sun Ce's cousin Sun Ben to lead an army to attack Liu Yao's generals Fan Neng (樊能) and Yu Mi (于糜) at Hengjiang (橫江). Wu Jing and Sun Ben also defeated Ze Rong and Xue Li (薛禮) at Moling (秣陵; present-day Nanjing, Jiangsu).

Starting in 194, Sun Ce borrowed troops from Yuan Shu and embarked on a series of conquests in the Jiangdong (or Wu) region. He attacked territories under the control of warlords such as Liu Yao, Yan Baihu and Wang Lang and conquered them. When Sun Ce was trapped in Niuzhu (牛渚), Wu Jing came to his nephew's rescue and captured all the enemies. Wu Jing participated in Sun Ce's campaign against Liu Yao in 195. When Liu Yao fled to Yuzhang Commandery (豫章郡; around present-day Nanchang, Jiangxi) after his defeat, Sun Ce sent Wu Jing and Sun Ben to Shouchun (壽春; present-day Shou County, Anhui) to report his victory to Yuan Shu. Concurrently, Yuan Shu was fighting with another warlord Liu Bei for control over Xu Province, so he appointed Wu Jing as the Administrator of Guangling Commandery (廣陵郡; in present-day Jiangsu).

Around late 196 or early 197, Yuan Shu revealed his intention to declare himself emperor – an act perceived as treason against the reigning Emperor Xian. Sun Ce wrote to Yuan Shu and attempted to dissuade him from doing so, but was ignored. When Yuan Shu later did proclaim himself emperor, Sun Ce broke ties with him to avoid any association with the pretender. Sun Ce then sent a messenger to inform Wu Jing, who immediately left Guangling and brought his men to Jiangdong to join his nephew. Sun Ce reassigned Wu Jing as the Administrator of Danyang. The Han central government subsequently sent Wang Pu (王誧), a Consultant (議郎), as an envoy to Jiangdong to appoint Wu Jing as General Who Spreads Martial Might (揚武將軍) and approve his governorship of Danyang.

Wu Jing died in office in 203 during the reign of Emperor Xian.

== Descendants ==
Wu Jing's son, Wu Fen (吳奮), was commissioned as a military officer, placed in command of some troops, and enfeoffed as the Marquis of Xin Village (新亭侯). In 219, when Sun Quan (Sun Ce's younger brother and successor) and his general Lü Meng attacked Jing Province, Wu Fen was appointed as the Commandant (都督) of Wu Commandery and was tasked with defending Sun Quan's home territories. Wu Fen was succeeded by his son, Wu An (吳安), after his death. In the 240s, a power struggle broke out between Sun Quan's sons Sun Ba and Sun He, both of whom were fighting for the succession to their father's throne. Wu An supported Sun Ba during the contention and died in the aftermath.

Wu Fen's younger brother, Wu Qi (吳祺), was made a Marquis of a Chief Village (都亭侯). Wu Qi was close friends with Zhang Wen and Gu Tan. Wu Qi's marquis title was inherited by his son, Wu Zuan (吳纂), after his death. Wu Zuan married Teng Yin's daughter. In 256, when Teng Yin was executed for plotting against the regent Sun Chen, Wu Zuan was implicated and lost his life as well.

== See also ==
- Eastern Wu family trees#Sun Jian
- Lists of people of the Three Kingdoms
