= Eastern Wu family trees =

Bloodline of Wu family

This article contains the family trees of members of the Sun clan, who ruled the state of Eastern Wu (229–280), in the Three Kingdoms period (220–280), in China.

== Sun Jian, Sun Qiang and Sun Jing ==
Sun Zhong^{1} 孫鍾
Sun Jian 孫堅; Wentai 文台	Sun Qiang 孫羌; Shengtai 聖台	Sun Jing 孫靜; Youtai 幼台	Lady Sun (personal name unknown)	Xu Zhen 徐真
Xu Kun 徐琨
Sun Quan 孫權; Zhongmou 仲謀	Lady Xu 徐氏

Sun Jian was an alleged descendant of Sun Tzu, the author of The Art of War.

Sun Jian and Sun Qiang were twin brothers. Sun Jing was a younger brother of Sun Jian. Sun Jian had a younger sister, Lady Sun, who married Xu Zhen.

Xu Zhen and Sun Jian's younger sister had a son, Xu Kun. Xu Kun's daughter married Sun Jian's son Sun Quan.

^{1}The identity of the father of Sun Jian, Sun Qiang and Sun Jing is not historically attested. Their father's name was not recorded in the historical text Sanguozhi. However, the Yu Lin (語林), a collection of short stories by Pei Qi (裴啟), mentioned that Sun Hao was a great-great-grandson of Sun Zhong (孫鍾). Since Sun Hao was a great-grandson of Sun Jian, it is deduced that Sun Zhong was Sun Jian's father.

== Sun Jian ==
Lady Chen 陳氏	Sun Jian 孫堅; Wentai 文台	Lady Wu 吳氏	Wu Jing 吳景
Pan Jun 潘濬; Chengming 承明	Sun Lang 孫朗; Zao'an 早安	Sun Ce 孫策; Bofu 伯符	Sun Quan 孫權; Zhongmou 仲謀	Sun Yi 孫翊; Shubi 叔弼	Sun Kuang 孫匡; Jizuo 季佐
Pan Mi 潘祕	Daughter (name unknown)	Daughter (name unknown)	Hong Zi 弘咨	Liu Bei 劉備; Xuande 玄德	Lady Sun (personal name unknown)^{1} 孫氏

Four of Sun Jian's sons – Sun Ce, Sun Quan, Sun Yi and Sun Kuang – and one of his daughters (her identity is unrecorded) were born to his wife Lady Wu, who was Wu Jing's elder sister. Lady Sun married Liu Bei.

One of the two other daughters was born to Sun Jian's concubine Lady Chen, and she married Pan Jun's son Pan Mi.

It is not known who the mothers of the fifth son (Sun Lang) and the last daughter were. The last daughter was married to Hong Zi.

^{1}The true name of Sun Jian's daughter, Lady Sun, is unknown since women's names were not always recorded in ancient Chinese history. However, she is known as Sun Ren in Luo Guanzhong's 14th century historical novel Romance of the Three Kingdoms, and as Sun Shangxiang in Chinese opera and other contemporary materials.

=== Sun Ce ===
Elder Qiao 橋公
Gu Yong 顧雍; Yuantan 元歎	Sun Ce 孫策; Bofu 伯符	Da Qiao 大橋	Xiao Qiao 小橋	Zhou Yu 周瑜; Gongjin 公瑾	Zhu Zhi 朱治; Junli 君理
Gu Shao 顧邵; Xiaoze 孝則	Daughter (name unknown)	Sun Shao 孫紹	Daughter (name unknown)	Zhu Ji 朱紀
Sun Feng 孫奉	Daughter (name unknown)	Lu Xun 陸遜; Boyan 伯言

Sun Ce married Da Qiao, the older of Elder Qiao's two daughters. Zhou Yu married the younger daughter Xiao Qiao.

Sun Ce's son was Sun Shao. Sun Shao's son was Sun Feng. Sun Ce had several daughters: one married Gu Yong's son Gu Shao, another married Lu Xun, and another married Zhu Zhi's son Zhu Ji. It is not known whether Sun Ce's children were born to Da Qiao or not.

During the Tang dynasty, an unnamed 13th-generation patrilineal descendant of Sun Ce was recorded to have served as a Buddhist master at the Lingyin Temple.

=== Sun Quan ===
Yuan Shu 袁術; Gonglu 公路	Sun Quan 孫權; Zhongmou 仲謀
Lady Yuan 袁氏	Xie Jiong 謝煚
Zhao Yuan 趙遠	Lady Zhao 趙氏	Lady Xie 謝氏	Sun Lü 孫慮; Zizhi 子智	Daughter (name unknown)	Liu Zuan 劉纂
Lady Xu^{1} 徐氏	Empress Dayi 大懿皇后	Consort Xie 謝姬	Consort Zhong 仲姬	Empress Jinghuai 敬懷皇后	Empress Pan 潘皇后	Bu Lianshi 步練師
Sun Deng^{1} 孫登; Zigao 子高	Sun He 孫和; Zixiao 子孝	Sun Ba 孫霸; Ziwei 子威	Sun Fen 孫奮; Ziyang 子揚	Sun Xiu 孫休; Zilie 子烈	Sun Liang 孫亮; Ziming 子明	Sun Luban 孫魯班; Dahu 大虎	Sun Luyu 孫魯育; Xiaohu 小虎

Sun Quan had ten wives/concubines: Lady Xie; Lady Yuan; Lady Zhao; Lady Xu; Empress Dayi, née Wang; Consort Xie; Consort Zhong; Empress Jinghuai, née Wang; Empress Pan; Bu Lianshi. Lady Yuan was Yuan Shu's daughter; Lady Zhao was Zhao Yuan's sister; Lady Xie was Xie Jiong's daughter; Lady Xu was Xu Kun's daughter; Empress Dayi was Wang Lujiu's daughter. Sun Quan had seven sons: Sun Deng, Sun He, Sun Ba, Sun Fen, Sun Xiu, Sun Liang and Sun Lü. Sun Quan had three daughters: Sun Luban, Sun Luyu, and a third one, whose name is unknown.

Lady Xu was Sun Deng's adoptive mother; Empress Dayi bore Sun He; Consort Xie bore Sun Ba; Consort Zhong bore Sun Fen; Empress Jinghuai bore Sun Xiu; Empress Pan bore Sun Liang; Bu Lianshi bore Sun Luban and Sun Luyu. It is unknown who the mothers of Sun Lü and the third daughter were. Sun Quan's third daughter was married to Zhu Ju initially, but was later remarried to Liu Zuan.

^{1}Lady Xu was not Sun Deng's mother. However, under Sun Quan's instruction, she raised Sun Deng. Sun Deng was grateful to her and saw her as his real mother.

==== Sun Deng ====
Zhou Yu 周瑜; Gongjin 公瑾
Sun Deng 孫登; Zigao 子高	Consort Zhou 周妃
Sun Fan 孫璠	Sun Ying 孫英	Sun Xi 孫希

Sun Deng married Zhou Yu's daughter. He had three sons: Sun Fan, Sun Xi and Sun Ying. It is unknown whether his three sons were born to Lady Zhou or not.

==== Sun Ba ====
Liu Yao 劉繇; Zhengli 正禮
Liu Ji 劉基; Jingyu 敬輿
Sun Ba 孫霸; Ziwei 子威	Lady Liu 劉氏
Sun Ji 孫基	Sun Yi 孫壹

Sun Ba married the daughter of Liu Yao's son Liu Ji. Sun Ba had two sons: Sun Ji and Sun Yi. It is not stated whether his sons were born to Lady Liu or not.

==== Sun He (Zixiao) ====
Zhang Zhao 張昭; Zibu 子布	Zhuge Jin 諸葛瑾; Ziyu 子瑜
Lu Xun 陸遜; Boyan 伯言	Zhang Cheng 張承; Zhongsi 仲嗣	Daughter (name unknown)	He Sui 何遂
Lu Kang 陸抗; Youjie 幼節	Lady Zhang 張氏	Consort Zhang 張妃	Sun He 孫和; Zixiao 子孝	Lady He 何氏
Lu Jing 陸景; Shiren 士仁	Daughter (name unknown)	Sun Jun 孫俊
Sun Qian 孫謙	Sun De 孫德	Sun Hao 孫皓; Yuanzong 元宗

Sun He had two wives: Consort Zhang and Lady He. Consort Zhang was the daughter of Zhang Zhao's son Zhang Cheng and Zhuge Jin's daughter. Lady He was the daughter of He Sui.

Sun He had four sons – Sun Jun, Sun Hao, Sun De and Sun Qian – and one daughter, whose name is unknown. Sun Hao was born to Lady He, Sun Jun and the daughter were born to Consort Zhang, while the identities of the mothers of Sun De and Sun Qian are unknown. Sun He's daughter married Lu Jing, the son of Lu Kang (Lu Xun's son) and Lady Zhang (another daughter of Zhang Cheng). Both Sun He's daughter and Lu Jing were therefore Zhang Cheng's maternal grandchildren.

===== Sun Hao (Yuanzong) =====
Zhang Bu 張布	Teng Mu 滕牧
Sun Hao 孫皓; Yuanzong 元宗	Teng Fanglan 滕芳蘭
Lady Zhang 張氏	Lady Zhang 張氏
Sun Jin 孫瑾	Sun Qian 孫虔	Prince of Qi 齊王 (name unknown)	Prince of Chenliu 陳留王 (name unknown)	Prince of Zhangling 章陵王 (name unknown)	Prince of Chengji 成紀王 (name unknown)
Prince of Xuanwei 宣威王 (name unknown)	Prince of Zhongshan 中山王 (name unknown)	Prince of Dai 代王 (name unknown)	Sun Chong 孫充	Sun Fan 孫璠	(25 other sons, names unknown.)

Sun Hao had three wives. Two of them were Zhang Bu's daughters. The third one was Teng Mu's daughter Teng Fanglan.

Sun Hao's biography in the Sanguozhi stated:

In 269, Sun Hao instated his son Sun Jin as crown prince, as well as instating the princes of Huaiyang and Dongping. ... In 273, he renamed "Prince of Huaiyang" and "Prince of Dongping" to "Prince of Lu" and "Prince of Qi" respectively. He also instated the princes of Chenliu and Zhangling, and seven other princes, making 11 princes (including Lu and Qi) in total. ... In 278, he instated the princes of Chengji and Xuanwei, and nine other princes. ... In 280, he instated the princes of Zhongshan and Dai, and nine other princes.

Wang Jun's biography in the Jin Shu confirmed the identity of the "Prince of Lu" as Sun Qian. The biography of Emperor Yuan in the Jin Shu mentioned Sun Hao's son Sun Fan, while the biography of Zhou Chu mentioned Sun Hao's son Sun Chong. It might be possible that Sun Fan and Sun Chong were among the 32 sons (seven of whom were known by their princely titles), apart from Sun Jin and the Prince of Lu (Sun Qian), mentioned in Sun Hao's biography. Otherwise, Sun Hao would have had 36 sons in total.

There are no records of Sun Hao's daughters nor any records of the identities of the mothers of his sons.

==== Sun Xiu ====
Zhu Ju 朱據; Zifan 子範	Sun Luyu 孫魯育; Xiaohu 小虎
Sun Xiu 孫休; Zilie 子烈	Empress Zhu 朱皇后
Sun Wan 孫𩅦; Qi 莔	Sun Gong 孫𩃙; Xian 𧟨	Sun Mang 孫壾; Ju 昷	Sun Bao 孫𠅨; Yong 㷏

Sun Xiu married Empress Zhu, the daughter of Zhu Ju and Sun Luyu (Sun Xiu's half-sister).

Sun Xiu had four sons: Sun Wan, Sun Gong, Sun Mang and Sun Bao. It is not stated whether Sun Xiu's four sons were born to Empress Zhu or not.

- Note: All of Sun Xiu's sons, except for Sun Mang, were given personal names and courtesy names with unique Chinese characters created by Sun Xiu himself, computers lacking extended unicode fonts may not display the names properly.

==== Sun Liang ====
	Quan Shang 全尚; Zizhen 子真
Sun Liang 孫亮; Ziming 子明	Quan Huijie 全惠解

Sun Liang married Quan Huijie, the daughter of Quan Shang.

=== Sun Yi ===
Sun Yi 孫翊; Shubi 叔弼		Lady Xu 徐氏
	Sun Song 孫松; Ziqiao 子喬

Sun Yi was married to Lady Xu, they had a son, Sun Song.

=== Sun Kuang ===
Cao Cao's younger brother (name unknown)
Sun Kuang 孫匡; Jizuo 季佐	Lady Cao 曹氏
Sun Tai 孫泰
Sun Xiu 孫秀; Yancai 彥才
Sun Jian 孫儉; Zhongjie 仲節

Sun Kuang married the daughter of Cao Cao's younger brother. They had a son, Sun Tai. Sun Tai's son was Sun Xiu. Sun Xiu's son was Sun Jian.

== Sun Qiang ==
Sun Qiang 孫羌; Shengtai 聖台
Sun Ben 孫賁; Boyang 伯陽	Sun Fu 孫輔; Guoyi 國儀

Sun Qiang had two sons: Sun Ben and Sun Fu. Sun Ben was elder than Sun Fu.

=== Sun Ben ===
Sun Ben 孫賁; Boyang 伯陽	Cao Cao 曹操; Mengde 孟德
Sun Lin 孫鄰; Gongda 公達	Sun An 孫安	Sun Xi 孫熙	Sun Ji 孫績	Daughter (name unknown)	Cao Zhang^{1} 曹彰; Ziwen 子文
Sun Miao 孫苗	Sun Lü 孫旅	Sun Shu 孫述	Sun Zhen 孫震	Sun Xie 孫諧	Sun Xin 孫歆

Sun Ben had four sons: Sun Lin, Sun An, Sun Xi and Sun Ji. Sun Lin was the eldest of the four. Sun Ben also had a daughter, who was married to Cao Cao's son Cao Zhang.

Sun Lin had six sons: Sun Miao, Sun Lü, Sun Shu, Sun Zhen, Sun Xie and Sun Xin.

^{1}The name of Cao Cao's son, Cao Zhang, who married Sun Ben's daughter, was recorded in Sun Ce's biography in the Sanguozhi as 曹章. This is a misspelling, because this Cao Zhang referred to Cao Zhang (曹彰).

=== Sun Fu ===
		Sun Fu 孫輔; Guoyi 國儀
Sun Xing 孫興	Sun Zhao 孫昭	Sun Wei 孫偉	Sun Xin 孫昕	Daughter (name unknown)	Luo Tong 駱統; Gongxu 公緒

Sun Fu had four sons: Sun Xing, Sun Zhao, Sun Wei and Sun Xin. He also had a daughter, who was married to Luo Tong.

== Sun Jing ==
		Sun Jing 孫靜; Youtai 幼台
Sun Gao 孫暠	Sun Yu 孫瑜; Zhongyi 仲異	Sun Jiao 孫皎; Shulang 叔朗	Sun Huan 孫奐; Jiming 季明	Sun Qian 孫謙

Sun Jing had five sons: Sun Gao, Sun Yu, Sun Jiao, Sun Huan and Sun Qian.

=== Sun Gao (Sun Jing's son) ===
Sun Gao 孫暠
Sun Chuo 孫綽; Xinggong 興公	Sun Chao 孫超	Sun Gong 孫恭
Sun Chen 孫綝; Zitong 子通	Sun Ju 孫據	Sun En 孫恩	Sun Gan 孫幹	Sun Kai 孫闓	Zhu Ju 朱據; Zifan 子範
Quan Shang 全尚; Zizhen 子真	Daughter (name unknown)	Sun Jun 孫峻; Ziyuan 子遠	Daughter (name unknown)	Zhu Sun 朱損

Sun Gao had three sons: Sun Chuo, Sun Chao and Sun Gong.

Sun Gong's son was Sun Jun. Sun Jun's elder sister married Quan Shang. Sun Jun's younger sister married Zhu Ju's son Zhu Sun.

Sun Chuo had five sons: Sun Chen, Sun Ju, Sun En, Sun Gan and Sun Kai. Sun Chen was the eldest of the five sons.

=== Sun Yu ===
		Sun Yu 孫瑜; Zhongyi 仲異
Sun Mi 孫彌	Sun Xi 孫熙	Sun Yao 孫燿	Sun Man 孫曼	Sun Hong 孫紘

Sun Yu had five sons: Sun Mi, Sun Xi, Sun Yao, Sun Man and Sun Hong.

=== Sun Jiao ===
		Sun Jiao 孫皎; Shulang 叔朗
Sun Yin 孫胤	Sun Xi 孫晞	Sun Zi 孫咨	Sun Mi 孫彌	Sun Yi 孫儀

Sun Jiao had five sons: Sun Yin, Sun Xi, Sun Zi, Sun Mi and Sun Yi. Sun Xi was younger than Sun Yin. The other three were all younger than Sun Xi.

=== Sun Huan ===
Sun Huan 孫奐; Jiming 季明
Sun Cheng 孫承	Sun Yi 孫壹	Sun Feng 孫封	Daughter (name unknown)	Teng Yin 滕胤; Chengsi 承嗣
Daughter (name unknown)	Lü Ju 呂據; Shiyi 世議

Sun Huan had three sons: Sun Cheng, Sun Yi and Sun Feng. Sun Yi was born to Sun Huan's concubine and was younger than Sun Cheng. Sun Feng was younger than Sun Yi. Sun Huan also had two daughters who were younger than Sun Yi. One of the daughters married Teng Yin while the other married Lü Ju.

== Sun He (Bohai) ==
Sun He 孫河; Bohai 伯海	Sun He's brother (name unknown)
Sun Zhu 孫助	Sun Yi 孫誼	Sun Huan 孫桓; Shuwu 叔武	Sun Jun 孫俊; Shuying 叔英	Sun Shao 孫韶; Gongli 公禮
Sun Jian 孫建	Sun Shen 孫慎
Sun Cheng 孫丞; Xianshi 顯世
Sun Kai 孫楷	Sun Yue 孫越	Sun Yi 孫異	Sun Yi 孫奕	Sun Hui 孫恢

Sun He was a distant relative of the Sun clan, and his original family name was Yu (俞). He was favoured by Sun Ce, who granted him and his immediate family the family name "Sun" and inducted them into the Sun clan. Sun He had four sons: Sun Zhu, Sun Yi, Sun Huan and Sun Jun (ranked in order of seniority from left to right).

Sun Jun had two sons: Sun Jian and Sun Shen. Sun Jian was elder than Sun Shen. Sun Shen's son was Sun Cheng.

Sun Shao was a son of Sun He's younger brother. He had five sons: Sun Kai, Sun Yue, Sun Yi, Sun Yi and Sun Hui. Sun Kai was elder than Sun Yue. The other three were all younger than Sun Kai but it is unknown whether they were elder than Sun Yue or not.

== See also ==
- Cao Wei family trees
- Shu Han family trees
- Family tree of Sima Yi
