= Sun Yu (Han dynasty) =

Eastern Han dynasty general (177–215)

- 孫瑜

Administrator of Danyang (丹楊太守)
- In office 213 – 215
- In office 204 – ?

General of Vehement Might (奮威將軍)
- In office 213 – 215

Personal details
- Born: 177 (Note: The Sanguozhi recorded that Sun Yu died at the age of 39 (by East Asian age reckoning) in the 20th year of the Jian'an era (196–220) in the reign of Emperor Xian of Han. By calculation, Sun Yu's birth year should be around 177.)
- Died: 215 (aged 38)
- Relations: See Eastern Wu family trees
- Children: Sun Mi; Sun Xi; Sun Yao; Sun Man; Sun Hong
- Parent: Sun Jing (father)
- Occupation: General
- Courtesy name: Zhongyi (仲異)

Sun Yu (177–215), courtesy name Zhongyi, was a cousin of Sun Quan, a Chinese warlord who lived during the late Eastern Han dynasty and later became the founding emperor of the state of Eastern Wu in the Three Kingdoms period. Sun Yu would twice serve in the sensitive area of Danyang (丹楊), showing generosity to those fleeing the chaos in the north and a keenness to learn, he was also active in Jing province as a general.

== Early life ==
From Wu Commandery, Sun Yu was the son of Sun Jing, who had raised the core of the military officer Sun Jian's army, then, during the civil war, served under Yu's warlord cousins Sun Ce and Sun Quan. Sun Jing held military rank but often chose to remain in their home area, in Fuchun County, Wu Commandery, which is around present-day Fuyang District, Hangzhou, Zhejiang

In 200, Sun Ce was assassinated and there was uncertainty around who might rule, Yu's elder brother Sun Gao/Hao (孫暠) made a play for Kuaiji with the Wucheng garrison under his command. While this was seen off by Yu Fan's preparedness and warnings, Sun Gao's career ended. Sun Jing was promoted, but likely did not live long. Around this time, Sun Yu was made a Colonel, but his rank was lower than that of his father and brother.

== First spell at Danyang ==
In 204, there was a crisis at Danyang, part of the heart of the Sun family control of the south, as Sun Quan's brother Sun Yi was assassinated. The crisis was soon settled, but Sun Quan needed a replacement for the sensitive post, and he turned to Sun Yu who, likely through family resources and his noted generosity, brought a following of ten thousand.

One refugee from the north in Sun Yu's circle was Ma Pu(馬普) of Jiyin, a scholar of the ancient history. Sun Yu treated him well and sent the relatives of those who held office under him to study under Ma Pu. Then those hundreds of people were used to help establish schools in Danyang and lectures with Sun Yu ensured food and drink was provided.

== Military career ==
Promoted from Colonel to General at some point after taking command of Danyang, in 206 and 207 he joined with Zhou Yu to attack and capture the refugees in Mo and Bao among the marshes in present-day Jiayu in Hubei as Sun Quan prepared to attack Huang Zu, Liu Biao's commander in the south of Jing.

In 210, Zhou Yu proposed he would lead an army against Liu Zhang in Yi province and then the theocratic Zhang Lu in Hanzhong, requesting his old associate Sun Yu join him for the long haul. The plan was, that, on conquering the west, Sun Yu would be entrusted to look after those lands while Zhou Yu returned to Sun Quan. However, Zhou Yu died before any invasion of the west could be begun. According to Yuan Ye's (袁暐) Xiandi Chunqiu (獻帝春秋)/Chronicle of Emperor Xian, Sun Quan sent Sun Yu to try anyway but Liu Bei objected, threatening to become a recluse and sending his officers to block the way. Sun Yu was recalled. However, while Sima Guang's Zizhi Tongjian includes the tale, historian Rafe De Crespigny disputes Sun Yu was ever sent as too risky a move for Sun Quan at that time. The aborted campaign is the only time Sun Yu appears in the 14th century novel Romance of the Three Kingdoms by Luo Guanzhong, made a brother of Sun Quan and dispatched while Zhou Yu is still alive.

In 212, he was with Sun Quan against northern warlord Cao Cao at the newly created defences of Ruxu and urged Sun Quan against giving battle, Sun Quan didn't listen and suffered a loss though Sun Quan would win the campaign in 213.

== Second spell at Danyang ==
Following Ruxu, Sun Yu was promoted to General of Vehement Might and sent to Danyang for a second spell. Sun Yu moved his garrison from the crossing points at Liyang in Jiujiang to Niuzhu. When Cao Cao attempted, during the failed campaign of 212-213, to force people near the Yangzi back to the more secure control of the Huai, Sun Yu sought to counter it. Sun Yu, always generous to refugees, had an open-door policy to those fleeing south, he sent Rao Zhu (饒助) and Yan Lian (顏連) to Xiang'an (襄安) and Juchao (居巢), south-east of Lujiang to win people over while also appealing to the people of Jiujiang. Sun Yu seems to have had considerable success in the battle for influence of the people in the border regions, many choosing to go south to Sun Quan over moving north with Cao Cao. Though neither side held Xiang'an nor Juchao after the resettlement and no man's land developed.

== Death and legacy ==
He died at the age of 39 by East Asian age reckoning in 215. He left behind five sons: Sun Mi (孫彌), Sun Xi (孫熙), Sun Yao (孫燿), Sun Man (孫曼) and San Hong (孫紘) with only Man noted as having a career, reaching rank of General and being enoffed.

== Personality ==
Sun Yu was known for his generous and courteous treatment of émigrés from the north who had fled to the south for safety and joined Sun Quan. Despite often being involved in military affairs, Sun Yu always had an interest in classical texts, he never stopped reading and reciting.

== See also ==
- Lists of people of the Three Kingdoms
