= Sun Huan (Jiming) =

Chinese Eastern Wu state general (195–234)

- 孫奐
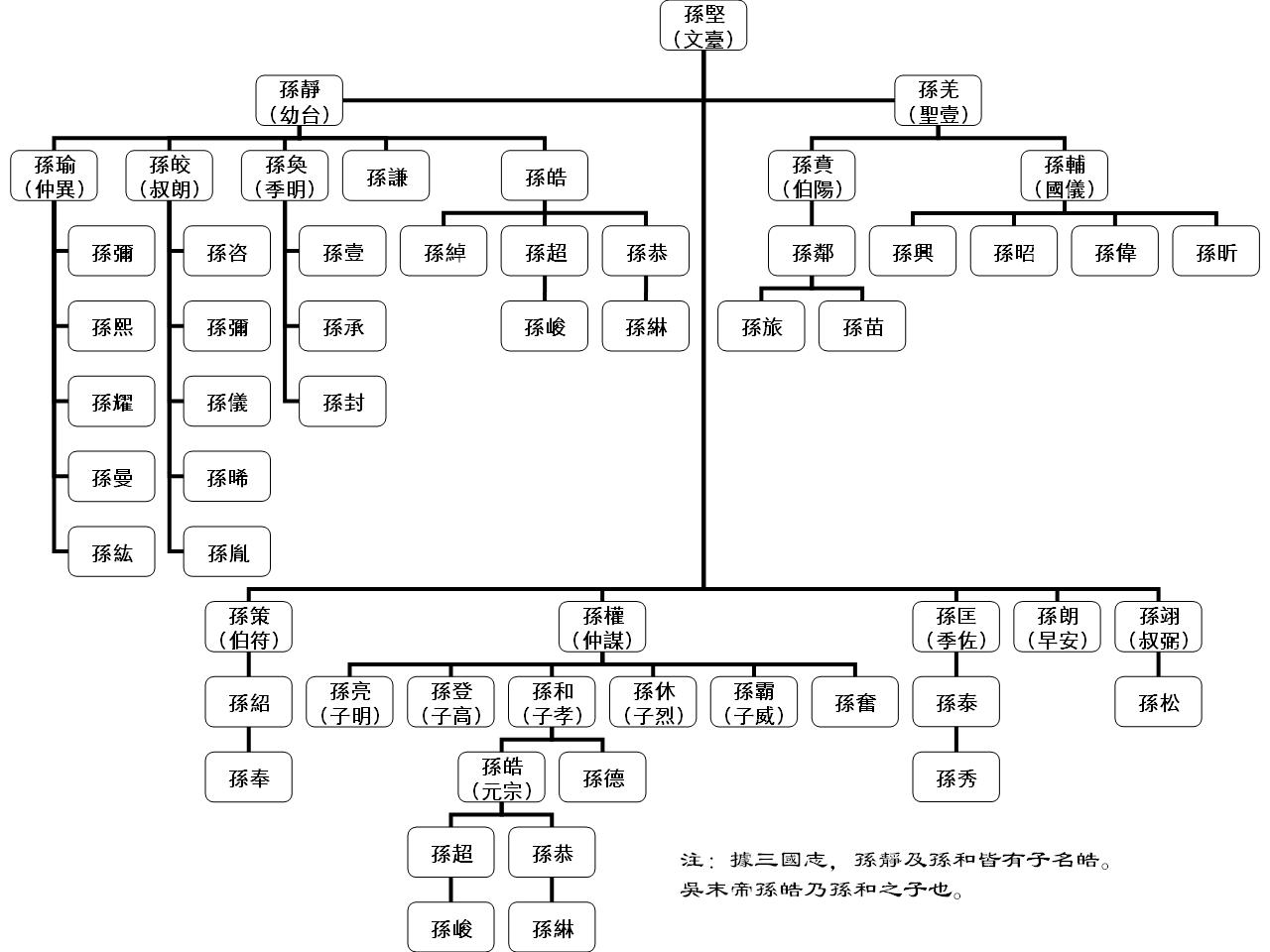
- Family tree of Sun Huan

General of the Household (中郎將)
- In office 212 – 234
- Monarch: Sun Quan

Personal details
- Born: 195
- Died: 234
- Relations: See Eastern Wu family trees
- Parent: Sun Jing (father)
- Occupation: Administrator of Jiangxia
- Courtesy name: Jiming (季明)

Sun Huan (195-234), courtesy name Jiming, was a military general of the state of Eastern Wu during the Three Kingdoms period. He was the fourth son of Sun Jing, uncle of Sun Quan, the founding emperor of Wu, and a younger brother of Sun Jiao (孫皎).

== Life ==
Born in the county of Wu, he was raised to be a soldier for the glory of the Sun family. In 212, his elder brother Jiao was promoted to general and left in charge of Xiakou (Note: Present-day: Xiakou, Pingshan County, Shijiazhuang, Hebei, China.) in Jiangxia, replacing the general Cheng Pu (程普) who had organised the defences of this territory after it was transferred to Liu Bei, two years earlier. Sun Huan entered military service serving under his elder brother Jiao for several years. In 219, Jiao died and Sun Huan inherited the command of Jiao's men. He was then named General of the Household and acted as Administrator of Jiangxia. He was tasked with protecting the contested border with Wei. He distinguished himself against Shu in the battle of Yiling under Lu Xun in 222. In 226, despite Sun Quan's unsuccessful campaign to seize northern Jiangxia, he captured three Wei generals at Shiyang and was then enfeoffed for his achievements.

He died in 234 and was well remembered by the people of Wu, who praised him for his contributions to promoting scholarship in Jiangxia.

== See also ==
- Lists of people of the Three Kingdoms
- Eastern Wu family trees#Sun Jing (Youtai)
