= Lady Xu (wife of Sun Quan) =

Concubine of Eastern Wu emperor Sun Quan

Lady Xu 徐夫人
- Born: Unknown
- Died: in or after May 229
- Spouse: Sun Quan
- Father: Xu Kun

Lady Xu (died in or after May 229) was a concubine of Sun Quan, the founding emperor of the state of Eastern Wu during the Three Kingdoms period of China.

== Life ==
Lady Xu was from Fuchun County (富春縣), Wu Commandery, around present day Fuyang, Zhejiang. She was the daughter of Xu Kun (徐琨), a cousin of Sun Quan through his father Sun Jian's younger sister (Lady Sun), who was killed in action fighting against Huang Zu. Lady Xu was initially married to Lu Shang (陸尚), also of Fuchun County. When Lu Shang died around 200, Lady Xu was taken in by Sun Quan as a concubine, on which occasion he told his first wife Lady Xie to lower herself in status to accommodate Lady Xu's arrival; Lady Xie refused and fell into disfavour, dying at a relatively early age. As part of her duties as concubine, Lady Xu was assigned as adoptive mother to Sun Deng, Quan's son by a mother of lowly status, who would later acknowledge her as his mother. When Sun Quan later relocated in 212, he abandoned Lady Xu in Wu, irritated on account of her jealous nature.

In May 229, when Sun Quan declared himself emperor of Eastern Wu, his advisors pushed for Lady Xu to be declared his official empress, being the respectable adopted mother of Sun Deng, Sun Quan's heir apparent since he was created King of Wu in 221. However, Quan refused, favouring Lady Bu instead, who was treated unofficially as empress and later posthumously titled as such. Lady Xu herself died of illness sometime after.

== Family and relatives ==
Lady Xu's grandfather Xu Zhen (徐真) was a close acquaintance of Sun Jian, who gave Zhen his younger sister in marriage, leading to the birth of Xu Kun, Lady Xu's father. Xu Kun in his youth served in provincial and commandery offices, although he left his post to serve Sun Jian in battle as his Lieutenant General. He continued to serve Sun Ce during this time in battles against Fan Neng (樊能) and Yu Mi (于糜) at Hengjiang (橫江) and against Zhang Ying (張英) at Danglikou (當利口) in 195. Kun's mother, Lady Sun, was accompanying the army at the time, and her suggestion to Kun to build rafts to cross the riverine territory before Zhang Ying's navies could amass was approved by Sun Ce. With Ying destroyed, he also aided Sun Ce in defeating Ze Rong and Liu Yao, and Sun Ce memorialised to have him made Administrator of Danyang Commandery (丹楊郡).

In 197, Xu Kun was dispatched to displace Yuan Yin, who had been declared Administrator of Danyang by his cousin Yuan Shu, but before long Sun Ce recalled him to Wu and restored Wu Jing as Grand Administrator of Danyang; the Jiangbiaozhuan (江表傳 Biographies from Across the River) claims that he did so for fear of Xu Kun's influence and troops, as well as in favour of Wu Jing's charisma and trust from his previous term in Danyang. Sun Ce instead appointed Xu Kun as General of the Household Who Supervises the Army. He later assisted in defeating Li Shu (李術) at Lujiang in 200, for which he was created Marquis of Guangde (廣德侯) and appointed General Who Pacifies Barbarians (平虜將軍). He was later struck by an arrow and killed around 203, roughly the time of the Battle of Xiakou, during the campaign against Huang Zu.

Lady Xu's elder brother Xu Jiao (徐矯) inherited his father's marquisate, and campaigned against the Black Mountain Shanyue, for which he was made lieutenant general. Xu Jiao died childless before his sister. Their younger brother Xu Zuo (徐祚) inherited the title, and for his martial merits he was appointed as Supervisor of Wuhu (蕪湖督) and General Who Pacifies Wei (平魏將軍).

== See also ==
- Eastern Wu family trees § Sun Quan
- Lists of people of the Three Kingdoms
