= Kuai Liang =

Late Han dynasty adviser to warlord Liu Biao

- Traditional Chinese: 蒯良
- Simplified Chinese: 蒯良
Transcriptions
Standard Mandarin
- Hanyu Pinyin: Kuǎi Liáng

Zirou (courtesy name)
- Chinese: 子柔
Transcriptions
Standard Mandarin
- Hanyu Pinyin: Zǐróu

Kuai Liang (fl. 190s–200s), courtesy name Zirou, was an adviser to the warlord Liu Biao during the late Eastern Han dynasty of China. He was from Zhonglu County, Nan Commandery, which is located southwest of present-day Xiangyang, Hubei. He had a younger brother, Kuai Yue, and a son Kuai Jun (蒯钧) who had a stint as Administrator of Nanyang. Kuai Jun's daughter later married Sun Xiu, grandson of Sun Kuang.

== In Romance of the Three Kingdoms ==
In the 14th-century historical novel Romance of the Three Kingdoms, Kuai Liang comes up with a plan to defeat Sun Jian at the Battle of Xiangyang in 191. He suggests to Huang Zu to retreat and lure Sun Jian to Xianshan (峴山), where Sun Jian is killed by Huang Zu's archers lying in ambush.

== See also ==
- Lists of people of the Three Kingdoms
