= Lei Xu =

Chinese officer and rebel

- 雷緒
- Military career
- Allegiance: Yuan Shu (before 199); Cao Cao (200–208); Liu Bei (209-?)
- Conflicts: Campaign against Yuan Shu; Battle of Jiangling (208)

Lei Xu, alternatively Lei Pu or Lei Bo, (Note: Though not outright stated in the primary sources, the names are believed by modern scholars to refer to the same individual, as Lei Xu and Lei Pu / Lei Bo (雷薄) operated in the same area with the same allies.) was a military officer and rebel who was mainly active in the 200s in China. Initially loyal to warlord Yuan Shu, Lei Xu abandoned his master when the latter's regime collapsed, becoming an independent bandit. In 200, he accepted the authority of Liu Fu, an official loyal to Cao Cao, but rebelled again in 208. In the following year, he was defeated by Cao Cao's general Xiahou Yuan and fled to Jing Province and submitted to Liu Bei.

== Biography ==
Lei Xu (referred to as "Lei Pu" by primary sources at this point) was first recorded as an officer serving under Yuan Shu, a warlord active during the end of the Han dynasty. Yuan Shu had declared himself "emperor of Zhong" in 197, resulting in a coalition of other warlords taking up arms against him. The Zhong regime quickly collapsed, and Yuan Shu fled his capital in 199. He travelled to the hills of Lujiang which were controlled by Lei Xu and another officer, Chen Lan. However, the two refused to accept their former superior, and drove him away.

By 200, Lei Xu, Chen Lan, and Mei Cheng were operating as bandits from Lujiang, using their dissident armies to plunder the area between the Yangzi and Huai River. Cao Cao, a powerful warlord who held the lands to the north, sought to restore some order to the region. He sent Liu Fu to become the inspector of Yang Province, and Liu managed to convince Lei Xu, Chen Lan, and Mei Cheng to submit.

In 208, Cao Cao suffered a major defeat in the Battle of Red Cliffs at the hands of three rival warlords, Sun Quan, Liu Bei, and Liu Qi. In addition, Liu Fu died around 209. These events caused Lei Xu, Chen Lan, and Mei Cheng to rebel once more. Cao Cao responded by sending one of his generals, Xiahou Yuan, who defeated Lei Xu and evicted him from Lujiang. However, the rebel leader survived and still commanded a sizable force of followers; he fled westward and submitted to Liu Bei. The Records of the Three Kingdoms reported that Lei then settled in Jing Province with tens of thousands of followers, but sinologist Rafe de Crespigny considers these numbers to be an exaggeration.

In de Crespigny's 2007 work, he suggested that Lei Xu was killed in 209. However, his 1990 work stated that the rebel fled to Liu Bei after defeat to Xiahou Yuan, with no mention of any further attack and death, while sinologist William Crowell suggests Lei Xu merely fled and later joined Liu Bei with no mention of death.

== See also ==
- Lists of people of the Three Kingdoms
