= Liu Chong (Prince Min of Chen) =

Eastern Han dynasty noble (died 197)

Liu Chong 劉寵

Prince of Chen (陳王)
- Tenure: ? (Note: While it is unknown when Liu Chong succeeded his father Liu Cheng, he was already Prince of Chen by 173.) – 197
- Predecessor: Liu Cheng
- Born: Unknown (Note: It is likely that Liu Chong was born after his father became Prince of Chen in April 124.)
- Died: 197
Names
- Family name: Liu (劉); Given name: Chong (寵)
Posthumous name
- Prince Min (愍王)
- House: Han dynasty
- Father: Liu Cheng

Liu Chong (Note: Not to be confused with Liu Dai's and Liu Yao's uncle of the same name, whose courtesy name is Zurong (祖荣).) (劉寵; died 197) was the sixth and last Prince of Chen (陳王) of the Eastern Han dynasty. He was unique in the imperial household in that he maintained his own territory during the last years of the Han dynasty while the rest of the Han princes and marquises played no role. He was assassinated by the imperial pretender Yuan Shu in 197 and became posthumously known as Prince Min of Chen (陳愍王).

== Life ==
The Kingdom of Chen (roughly present-day Zhoukou, Henan) was a fiefdom granted to Liu Xian (劉羨), the second son of Emperor Ming of Han. Liu Chong, son of Liu Cheng (劉承; Prince Xiao of Chen), (Note: Liu Cheng was a son of Liu Chong (different character from his grandson), Prince Qing of Chen. Liu Chong was originally Marquis of Anshou Village, but was made prince in May 120. Liu Chong died after about four years as prince in Apr 124, with Liu Cheng as his successor; the exact dates of Liu Chong being appointed Prince of Chen and his death were recorded in Emperor An's biography found in the same work. Between Liu Cheng and his son, their reign lasted for about 73 years (April 124-197).) was a great-grandson of Liu Xian. Liu Chong was described to be an energetic character who was skilled with the crossbow, even authoring a treatise on the subject, Nushe Bifa (弩射袐法).

In 173, Liu Chong and his former chancellor Wei Yin (魏愔) were accused by the new Chen chancellor Shi Qian (師遷) for inappropriately making sacrifices to deities seeking for fortunes beyond their ranks. This was impiety (不道), the most serious of crimes under the Han dynasty and tantamount to treason. Both Wei Yin and his accuser Shi Qian were brought to the capital of Luoyang in cage-carts for questioning. The eunuch Wang Fu presided over the investigations, and found that while the ceremonies made to Huang–Lao had been improper, there were no grounds for charges of impiety against Liu Chong and Wei Yin. Shi Qian had thus falsely accused his lord and was himself guilty of impiety, and in the end both Shi Qian and Wei Yin were executed. Emperor Ling, having just exterminated the family of Liu Kui (劉悝) the Prince of Bohai (渤海王) on similar charges, closed the case against Liu Chong in order to avoid more bloodshed in the imperial household.

When the Yellow Turban Rebellion broke out in 184, many of Liu Chong's peers were chased out of their fiefs, but Liu Chong raised a force of several thousand archers and fortified himself in his capital. His formidable reputation kept the populace in line, and the Chen fief was unscathed by the rebellion. In 190, when a coalition was being formed against the warlord Dong Zhuo, who had taken control of the imperial court, Liu Chong rallied troops in support of the coalition and styled himself the General who Supports the Han (輔漢將軍). He moved his troops north to Yangxia commandery (陽夏; present-day Taikang County) to join the anti-Dong Zhuo blockade, but as the coalition fell apart and its leaders began to fight amongst themselves, Liu Chong returned to Chen. Under the leadership of Liu Chong and his chancellor Luo Jun (駱俊; father of Luo Tong), the kingdom of Chen became an oasis of peace and prosperity as China descended into civil war, taking in over a hundred thousand refugees from neighbouring territories.

In early 197, Yuan Shu declared himself emperor in Shouchun, south of Chen across the Huai River. This audacious act made him a target of the other warlords. After being defeated by the forces of Lü Bu, Yuan Shu could not feed his army and requested supplies from the Chen fief. However, he was rebuffed by Luo Jun, and Yuan Shu responded by sending an assassin to kill both Luo Jun and Liu Chong. With the two leading figures dead, the kingdom of Chen fell into ruin.
