= Sun Jiao =

Chinese general and cousin of Sun Quan (died 219)

- 孫皎

Protector-General (都護)
- In office 215 – 219

General Who Attacks Barbarians (征虜將軍)
- In office 215 – 219

Personal details
- Born: between 177 and 194
- Died: January or February 220 (Note: The Sanguozhi recorded that Sun Jiao died in the 24th year of the Jian'an era (196–220) of the reign of Emperor Xian of Han. However, volume 68 of Zizhi Tongjian recorded that Guan Yu was captured and executed in the 12th month of that year; the month corresponds to 23 January to 21 February 220 in the Julian and the proleptic Gregorian calendars. Thus, if Sun Jiao died soon after Guan Yu's execution, his death date should be in January or February 220.)
- Relations: See Eastern Wu family trees
- Children: Sun Yin; Sun Xi; Sun Zi; Sun Mi; Sun Yi
- Parent: Sun Jing (father)
- Occupation: General
- Courtesy name: Shulang (叔朗)

Sun Jiao (died January or February 220), courtesy name Shulang, was a cousin of Sun Quan, a Chinese warlord who lived during the late Eastern Han dynasty and later became the founding emperor of the state of Eastern Wu in the Three Kingdoms period.

== Life ==
Sun Jiao was the third son of Sun Jing, a younger brother of Sun Quan's father Sun Jian. Along with the rest of his family, Sun Jiao first served as a military general under Sun Ce (Sun Jian's eldest son and successor) and then under Sun Quan (Sun Ce's younger brother and successor). After the Battle of Ruxu in 213, his leadership skills were highly praised by all with whom he served.

In reward for his deeds at Ruxu, he was chosen to succeed Cheng Pu as commander of Xiakou when Cheng was promoted to a higher position. In addition, he was given commands of two prominent Wu generals who had died: his elder brother Sun Yu and Huang Gai.

Once, while drinking with fellow commander Gan Ning, Sun Jiao made a comment under the influence of alcohol that deeply offended Gan Ning, who sent a letter to Sun Quan requesting a transfer from Sun Jiao's command to Lü Meng's. As his adviser Zhuge Jin was Sun Jiao's closest friend, Sun Quan sent him to admonish Sun Jiao for offending Gan Ning. Thus reprimanded, Sun Jiao apologised to Gan Ning, and the two became close friends.

Sun Jiao earned merits in the 215 campaign on Jing Province, in which Sun Quan's forces overran several of Liu Bei's commanderies in the province. In 219, Sun Jiao participated in a second invasion of Liu Bei's holdings in Jing Province. When preparing for the battle, Sun Quan intended for Sun Jiao and Lü Meng to hold joint command over the military, much as his generals Zhou Yu and Cheng Pu had during the Battle of Red Cliffs. Lü Meng, however, advised Sun Quan against this arrangement, as it could lead to dissension in the ranks, and asked him to choose whomever he saw fit for the position. In the end, Lü Meng was chosen, and Sun Jiao participated under his command. There is no record of Sun Jiao feeling slighted by this arrangement.

The campaign was a resounding success, with Liu Bei's trusted associate and prized general, Guan Yu, being captured and executed. Sun Jiao earned numerous merits in the campaign, but not long after Guan Yu's execution, he died of sudden illness.

== See also ==
- Lists of people of the Three Kingdoms
