= Lady Wu (wife of Sun Jian) =

Chinese empress, wife of Sun Jian (died 202 or 207)

Lady Wu 吳夫人
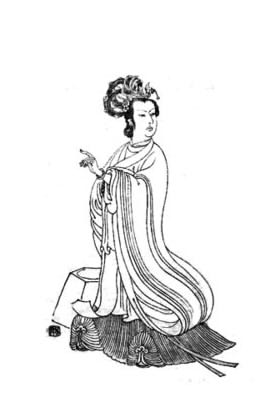
- A portrait of Lady Wu
- Born: Wu County, Wu Commandery, Eastern Han (now Suzhou, Jiangsu, China)
- Died: 202 or 207
- Spouse: Sun Jian
- Issue: Sun Ce; Sun Quan; Sun Yi; Sun Kuang; one daughter (Note: Her identity is unrecorded. The mother of Lady Sun was also unrecorded.)
Posthumous name
- Empress Wulie (武烈皇后)

Lady Wu (died 202 or 207 (Note: When annotating Lady Wu's biography in Sanguozhi, Pei Songzhi cited the Zhilin, which recorded that for the 12th and 13th years of the Jian'an era, Kuaiji Commandery did not nominate anyone to become officials, whereas there were nominations in the 8th and 9th years of said era. Thus, Pei concluded that Lady Wu died in 207. Vol.65 of Zizhi Tongjian also recorded that Lady Wu died in the 12th year of the Jian'an era.)), personal name unknown, was a Chinese noble lady and aristocrat. She was the wife of the warlord Sun Jian, who lived during the late Eastern Han dynasty of China. She bore Sun Jian four sons and a daughter – Sun Ce, Sun Quan, Sun Yi, Sun Kuang and Lady Sun. She was posthumously honoured as Empress Wulie in 229 by her second son Sun Quan, who became the founding emperor of the Eastern Wu dynasty in the Three Kingdoms period.

== Early life and marriage to Sun Jian ==
Lady Wu was from Wu County, Wu Commandery, which is around present-day Suzhou, Jiangsu, but she grew up in Qiantang County in present-day Hangzhou, Zhejiang. She was orphaned at a young age as both of her parents died so she lived with her younger brother, Wu Jing. Lady Wu's father was Wu Hui (吴煇), who was Inspector of Chongzhou.

Sun Jian heard of her beauty and character and desired to marry her. However, Lady Wu's relatives disliked Sun Jian, whom they perceived as an idler and a rascal, so they wanted to reject his proposal. Sun Jian was embarrassed and angry at their decision. Lady Wu told her relatives, "Why bring disaster upon yourselves just because of your love for me? If this turns out to be a bad marriage, I'll accept it as my fate." Lady Wu's relatives then agreed to her marriage to Sun Jian. She bore Sun Jian four sons and a daughter. She probably married Sun Jian in 175 or earlier because their first child, Sun Ce, was born that year.

According to a story in In Search of the Supernatural, Lady Wu dreamt about the moon entering her body before she gave birth to Sun Ce. Later, before she gave birth to Sun Quan, she had a similar dream about the sun entering her body. When she asked her husband about her strange dreams, he said, "The sun and the moon capture the true essence of yin and yang. They are very auspicious symbols. My descendants will become great men!"

In 190, when Sun Jian raised an army to join the campaign against Dong Zhuo, he relocated his family from Changsha Commandery (長沙郡; covering present-day Changsha and parts of Hunan) to Shu County (舒縣), Lujiang Commandery (廬江郡), which is in present-day Shucheng County, Anhui. In Shu, Sun Ce met and befriended Zhou Yu, who was about the same age as him. Zhou Yu offered to let Sun Ce and his family stay with him and he paid respects to Lady Wu as though she was his real mother. Zhou Yu and Sun Ce became very close friends.

== Life during Sun Ce's conquests in Jiangdong ==
Sun Jian was killed in action at the Battle of Xiangyang in 191 against Liu Biao's forces. He was succeeded by his eldest son Sun Ce. Around the time, Lady Wu's younger brother Wu Jing was appointed by the warlord Yuan Shu as the Administrator (太守) of Danyang Commandery (丹楊郡; around present-day Xuancheng, Anhui), but had yet to assume his appointment. Wu Jing was at Qu'e County (曲阿縣; in present-day Danyang, Jiangsu) then, so Sun Ce brought his family to Qu'e County to join his uncle.

Between 194 and 199, Sun Ce embarked on a series of conquests in the Jiangdong (or Wu) region to seize territories from the local governors and warlords in the area. He left his mother and family members in Qu'e County, but later had them relocated to Liyang County (歷陽縣; present-day He County, Anhui) and Fuling County (阜陵縣; around present-day Quanjiao County, Anhui) consecutively. After Sun Ce had conquered Wu (around present-day Suzhou) and Kuaiji (around present-day Shaoxing, Zhejiang) commanderies, he relocated his family to Wu County, which was Lady Wu's hometown.

When Sun Ce was in power in Jiangdong, he encountered a Taoist priest called Yu Ji, who had attracted a sizeable following for spreading his faith and for his alleged healing powers. Sun Ce accused Yu Ji of heresy and had him arrested. Many women came to see Lady Wu and implored her to save Yu Ji, so Lady Wu asked her son to release Yu Ji. She said, "Yu Ji brings good luck to the army and heals the soldiers. You shouldn't kill him." However, Sun Ce insisted that Yu Ji was a heretic and was corrupting the masses through his "teachings", so he had Yu executed.

Lady Wu was known for her wisdom and shrewdness in politics. The Kuaiji Dianlu (會稽典錄) recorded one incident in which Sun Ce wanted to kill Wei Teng (魏騰), an Officer of Merit (功曹) serving under him, when Wei opposed his views. The other officials were afraid and did not know what to do. Lady Wu showed up, stood beside a well, and told her son, "You've recently established a foothold in Jiangnan and there are many things you still need to do. You should treat men of talent with respect, pardon them for their minor mistakes and honour them for their contributions. Officer Wei has been performing his duties faithfully. If you kill him today, tomorrow others will rebel against you. I don't wish to see a tragedy occur, so I'll throw myself into this well." Sun Ce was shocked and he immediately released Wei Teng.

== Life during Sun Quan's administration ==
Sun Ce was assassinated in 200 CE by the servants of Xu Gong, a commandery administrator whom he killed earlier. He was succeeded by his younger brother, Sun Quan, who was still young when he took over the reins of power. Lady Wu rendered much assistance to Sun Quan in administering political and military affairs. She was worried that Sun Quan would be too young to handle the precarious situation in Jiangdong. She consulted Dong Xi about her incertitude, and Dong Xi emboldened the former by saying, "The lands east of the Yangzi enjoy natural barriers from mountains and rivers, while the good government and virtue of Sun Ce have already attracted the people, lord Sun Quan can build on these foundations, so that great and small may follow his commands.

Around 202, the warlord Cao Cao, who controlled the Han central government, demanded that Sun Quan send one of his sons to the imperial capital Xu (許; present-day Xuchang, Henan) as a hostage so as to secure Sun's allegiance towards him. When Sun Quan gathered his subjects to discuss the issue, they could not arrive at a conclusion. Personally, Sun Quan was not in favour of yielding to Cao Cao's demand, so he had another meeting with only his mother and Zhou Yu. Zhou Yu advised Sun Quan against sending a hostage while Lady Wu endorsed Zhou's suggestion and asked her son to treat Zhou like an elder brother. Sun Quan heeded their advice. (Note: See Zhou Yu#Advising Sun Quan not to send a hostage for details on this incident.)

Before her death in 202 or 207, Lady Wu summoned Zhang Zhao, Dong Xi and others and instructed them to help Sun Quan in governing the territories in Jiangnan. She was buried at Gaoling (高陵; believed to be somewhere in present-day Suzhou, Jiangsu). In 229, when Sun Quan declared himself Emperor and established the state of Eastern Wu, he granted his mother the posthumous title "Empress Wulie" (武烈皇后).

== In Romance of the Three Kingdoms ==
In the 14th-century historical novel Romance of the Three Kingdoms, Lady Wu had a fictional younger sister who also married Sun Jian. The elder Lady Wu was the mother of Sun Ce and Sun Quan while the younger one bore Lady Sun and Sun Lang. The younger Lady Wu was also known as "Wu Guotai" (吳國太; literally "Elder Lady of the State of Wu"). Wu Guotai lived longer than her sister because she played a significant role in the marriage of her daughter to Liu Bei in 209.

== See also ==
- Lists of people of the Three Kingdoms
- Eastern Wu family trees#Sun Jian
