= Zhao Juzhen =

Tang dynasty politician

Zhao Juzhen was a Tang dynasty politician who served during the reign of Emperor Xuanzong of Tang. He was the founder of Huating County, the first county-level division in Shanghai.

== Life ==
Zhao was born in Dingzhou. He was a member of the Zhao clan of Tianshui and a descendant of King Jia of Dai. His grandfather Baofu, father Buqi and brother Dongxi were scholar-officials in the imperial court.

In 713, Zhao was exceptionally promoted to a higher rank due to his literary talents. He then worked at the Ministry of Justice.

In 751, Zhao was the governor of Wu Commandery. He made a petition of establishing a county between Kunshan Jiaxing and Haiyan named Huating. His plan was approved by the imperial court and Huating county was formally established. The county was the first independent administrative division in the area of today's Shanghai. In 752, he served as the governor of Beihai Commandery and left his only recorded poem in Beihai.

In Beihai, Zhao held the Taoist ritual of Toulong. He prayed for the wellbeing of Emperor Xuanzong.
