= Sun Fu =

Cousin of Sun Quan, Eastern Wu state founding emperor

- 孫輔

Inspector of Jiao Province (交州刺史)
- In office ?–?

General Who Pacifies the South (平南將軍)
- In office ?–?

Administrator of Lujiang (廬陵太守)
- In office 199 – ?

Personal details
- Born: Unknown; Fuyang District, Hangzhou, Zhejiang
- Died: Unknown
- Relations: See Eastern Wu family trees
- Children: Sun Xing; Sun Zhao; Sun Wei; Sun Xin; Luo Tong's wife
- Parent: Sun Qiang (father)
- Occupation: General
- Courtesy name: Guoyi (國儀)

Sun Fu (fl. 190s–200s), courtesy name Guoyi, was a cousin of Sun Quan, a Chinese warlord who lived during the late Eastern Han dynasty and later became the founding emperor of the state of Eastern Wu in the Three Kingdoms period.

== Life ==
Sun Fu was the second son of Sun Qiang (孙羌), the full elder brother of Sun Quan's father Sun Jian; Fu had an elder brother, Sun Ben. He followed Sun Ce (Sun Jian's eldest son and successor) in his later campaigns against Yuan Shu and Liu Xun, earning great merits by raiding Lingyang and Lujiang. When Liu Xun was defeated, Sun Fu was put in charge of rebuilding the city walls, which he accomplished very well. He earned the title of General Who Pacifies the South.

Before the Battle of Red Cliffs, Sun Fu decided to surrender to Cao Cao. To this end, he sent a letter to Cao, proclaiming his intent to surrender, but this letter was intercepted. Sun Quan angrily stripped Sun Fu of all rank and imprisoned him, but spared him on account of filial duty. Sun Fu was released and died a few years after the battle, never again having a military command. His sons, however, all received rank.

== See also ==
- Lists of people of the Three Kingdoms
