= Bu Lianshi =

Eastern Wu noble lady (died 238)

Bu Lianshi 步練師
- Born: Unknown; Huai'an, Jiangsu
- Died: c.March or November 238; Jianye (modern-day Nanjing, Jiangsu), Eastern Wu dynasty
- Burial: Purple Mountain, Nanjing, Jiangsu
- Spouse: Sun Quan
- Issue: Sun Luban; Sun Luyu
Posthumous name
- None (Note: While Lady Bu was posthumously given the title of empress, she did not have a posthumous name.)

Lady Bu (died c.March or November 238), (Note: The Sanguozhi recorded that Lady Bu died in the 1st year of the Chiwu era (238–251) of Sun Quan's reign. Her biography in Sanguozhi recorded an edict by Sun Quan proclaiming her empress posthumously. This edict was issued on the wuzi day of the leap month of that year, which corresponds to 24 Nov 238 in the Julian calendar. Thus, Lady Bu most likely died in Nov 238. However, vol.02 of Jiankang Shilu indicate that Lady Bu was posthumously proclaimed empress in the 2nd month of that year, which corresponds to 3 Mar to 1 Apr 238 in the Julian calendar.) personal name Bu Lianshi, was a concubine of Sun Quan (Emperor Da), the founding emperor of the Eastern Wu during the Three Kingdoms period of China. She was posthumously honoured as an empress consort by Sun Quan. She is also known as Empress Bu.

== Life ==
Lady Bu was from Huaiyin County (淮陰縣), Linhuai Commandery (臨淮郡), which is in present-day Huai'an, Jiangsu. She was born sometime in the late Eastern Han dynasty. She was a relative of Bu Zhi. When she was young, her mother brought her from Huaiyin to Lujiang Commandery (廬江郡; around present-day Anqing, Anhui). In 199, Lujiang was conquered by the warlord Sun Ce, who controlled the territories in the Jiangdong region (also called Wu, covering present-day southeastern China), after which Lady Bu moved from Lujiang to Jiangdong. In Jiangdong, Lady Bu was noticed by Sun Ce's younger brother, Sun Quan. After Sun Quan abandoned his secondary wife Lady Xu in 212, Lady Bu became his favorite concubine. She bore Sun Quan two daughters: Sun Luban and Sun Luyu.

Lady Bu was known to be very accepting towards Sun Quan's other wives and she recommended other women to her husband. As such, she remained in her husband's favour in the long term. In May 229, when Sun Quan declared himself emperor and established the state of Eastern Wu, he considered whether to install Lady Bu as the empress. Lady Bu's relative also promoted this issue through referring to Lady Bu as the Empress. However, no one else supported Lady Bu; instead, they nominated Lady Xu to be the empress. The crown prince, Sun Deng, always responded more favorably to Lady Xu's gifts than to those from Lady Bu when both of them gave him gifts. Furthermore, Sun Quan himself had no particular desire to establish an empress. Consequently, although over a decade passed, neither Lady Xu nor Lady Bu became empress during their lifetimes.

Lady Bu died in 238 and was posthumously honoured as an empress on 24 November of that year. She was interred in the tomb of Lady Bu (歩夫人塚), a place located in Jiang Mausoleum (蔣陵. at the Purple Mountain, Nanjing, Jiangsu). Compared to Pan Shu, the formally-installed empress of Sun Quan, she received comparatively inferior treatment both during her lifetime and posthumously.

Lady Bu's personal name was not recorded in her biography in the Records of the Three Kingdoms (Sanguozhi), the authoritative source for the history of the Three Kingdoms period. However, the Jiankang Shilu mentioned that her personal name was "Lianshi", hence she was also known as "Bu Lianshi".

== In popular culture ==
Lady Bu is first introduced as a playable character in the seventh installment of Koei's Dynasty Warriors video game series. She is referred to as "Lian Shi" in the game.

== See also ==
- Eastern Wu family trees#Sun Quan
- Lists of people of the Three Kingdoms
