= Sun Lang =

3rd-century Chinese general

Sun Lang 孫朗
- Born: Unknown
- Died: Unknown
- Other names: Zao'an (早安; in Romance of the Three Kingdoms); Ding Lang (丁朗)
- Father: Sun Jian
- Relatives: See Eastern Wu family trees#Sun Jian

Sun Lang (fl.190 - 220s) was a son of the Chinese warlord Sun Jian, who lived during the late Eastern Han dynasty. He was a half-brother of Sun Quan, the founding emperor of the state of Eastern Wu in the Three Kingdoms period.

== Life ==
Little is recorded of Sun Lang's early life, except the fact that he was a son of Sun Jian and a concubine of his. The name of Sun Lang's mother was not recorded, and the birth order of him and his half siblings (children of Sun Jian and Lady Wu) was also unknown.

Sun Lang's misfortune occurred in 222, shortly after Sun Quan's triumph over Liu Bei at the Battle of Xiaoting. The emperor of Cao Wei, Cao Pi, launched a multi-pronged invasion against Eastern Wu. One prong was led by Cao Xiu, who led his army to Dongkou, which was defended by Lü Fan. Sun Lang was acting in capacity as a guardsman of the palace at the time and thus was under Lü Fan's authority. However, early in the battle, he accidentally set fire to his own camp, destroying a large quantity of supplies in the process. To compound the Wu forces' difficulty, a freak storm struck at Lü Fan's fleet, sending it crashing along the northern shore. Those troops in Lü Fan's fleet who did not drown were then in danger of either being attacked by Cao Xiu's troops or dying of starvation. The general Xu Sheng arrived, driving back Cao Xiu's forces long enough for Lü Fan to regroup, and Cao Xiu's fleet was driven back.

Despite the victory, Sun Quan was furious that his half-brother had nearly brought destruction upon the state and he punished Sun Lang heavily. Sun Lang had all his military ranks and appointments stripped off, was disowned from the Sun family and forced to change his name to Ding Lang (丁朗). He spent the rest of his life under house arrest.

== In Romance of the Three Kingdoms ==
In some versions of the 14th-century historical novel Romance of the Three Kingdoms, Sun Lang is referred to as "Sun Ren" (孫仁) and given the courtesy name Zao'an. In the novel, he is born to Lady Wu's fictional younger sister, who is also known as Wu Guotai.

== See also ==
- Lists of people of the Three Kingdoms
