= Sun Shao (general) =

Eastern Wu state general (188–241)

- 孫韶

Governor of You Province (幽州牧) (nominal)
- In office ? – 241
- Monarch: Sun Quan

General Who Guards the North (鎮北將軍)
- In office 229 – ?
- Monarch: Sun Quan

General Who Spreads Might (揚威將軍)
- In office 221 – 229
- Monarch: Sun Quan

Personal details
- Born: 188
- Died: 241 (aged 53)
- Relations: See Eastern Wu family trees
- Children: Sun Kai; Sun Yue; Sun Yi; Sun Yi; Sun Hui
- Occupation: General
- Courtesy name: Gongli (公禮)
- Peerage: Marquis of Jiande (建德侯)
- Other name: Yu Shao (俞韶)

Sun Shao (188–241), born Yu Shao, courtesy name Gongli, was a military general of the state of Eastern Wu during the Three Kingdoms period of China. Sun Ce, a warlord who lived in the late Eastern Han dynasty, granted the family name "Sun" to Sun Shao but never adopted him as a son. Sun Shao's uncle was Sun He (孫河) né Yu He (俞河), who had been brought into the Sun clan by Sun Jian. Sun Shao was described as a handsome man and was eight chi tall (approximately 184 cm).

== Life ==
In 204, the Grand Administrator of Danyang, Sun Jian's son Sun Yi was assassinated in Wanling by rebels still loyal to their former master Sheng Xian. Sun He discovered the culprits, but as one of the assassins, Gai Lan (媯覽), held a high military post in the city, Sun He was unable to control the military and was killed as well. After the deaths of the assassins at the hands of Sun Yi's former subordinates Sun Gao (孫高) and Fu Ying (傅嬰), Sun Shao assumed control of Danyang Commandery's military forces. The ruler of Eastern Wu, Sun Quan, tested Sun Shao's ability by feigning a night attack on his encampment, but found Sun Shao's men ready and his defences sound. The next day, Sun Quan rewarded the 16-year-old Sun Shao with the rank of colonel and control over the resources of Dantu (丹徒) and Qu'e (曲阿) counties, as well as formal control of the troops that had been under Sun He's command.

Prior to 220, Sun Shao was promoted to Lieutenant-General (偏將軍) and appointed as the Administrator of Guangling Commandery (roughly, the parts of modern Jiangsu and extreme eastern Anhui provinces which lie south of the Huai River and north of the Yangtze). In 221, when Sun Quan became the King of Wu, he promoted Sun Shao to General Who Spreads Might (揚威將軍), and granted the marquisate of Jiande in present-day Hangzhou.

In late 225, Cao Wei's emperor Cao Pi, in a continuing effort to make Sun Quan's crown prince Sun Deng a hostage at his court, advanced a huge army of over 100,000 troops through Sun Shao's territory in Guangling, with the intention of crossing the Yangtze River and marching to Wu's capital at Jianye. Unfortunately for him, the winter weather had made the river impassable with ice. Unable to get his boats safely into the river, Cao Pi withdrew in force. According to Zhang Bo's (張勃) Record of Wu (吳錄), during the withdrawal, Sun Shao ordered his subordinate officer Gao Shou (高壽) and others to take some 500 of their most valiant warriors and make a night raid on the Wei lines in an attempt to capture Cao Pi alive. Gao Shou and his troops managed to capture several carriages in Cao Pi's escort, but the man himself eluded them.

In 229, when Sun Quan proclaimed himself emperor, Sun Shao was appointed General who Guards the North (鎮北將軍). Sometime after 230, he was granted the nominal governorship of You Province. You Province comprised present-day Beijing, Tianjin, parts of northeast Hebei and western Liaoning. Far from Wu's northern frontier, the area never fell under their control; granting the title was merely a political statement of Sun Quan's assumed imperial power. In 234, during the fourth Battle of Hefei, Sun Shao and another general, Zhang Cheng, were tasked with leading a Wu army to attack Guangling and Huaiyin (淮陰). The episode ended in failure for Wu when Sun Quan's siege of Hefei was broken.

Sun Shao died of natural causes in 241.

== Family ==
Sun Shao's son, Sun Kai, served as Militant General-in-Chief for Eastern Wu, one of the highest military appointments in the palace, sharing with two others the command of the imperial guard. He also served as Junior Overseer of the Capital and was enfeoffed as the Marquis of Lincheng, in modern-day Xingtai, Hebei. In 276, Sun Kai was given the position of Cavalry General Garrisoning the Palace, but when bandits sneak-attacked the capital and killed emperor Sun Hao's younger brother Sun Qian (孫謙), Sun Kai came under heavy suspicion from Sun Hao of collaborating with the bandits. Terrified, he took his household and a hundred or so of his personal guard and defected to the Jin dynasty in c.July that year. Emperor Wu of Jin appointed him General of Chariots and Cavalry, a position similar to his appointment in Eastern Wu: one of three generals sharing command of the imperial guard. Sun Kai was additionally enfeoffed as the Marquis of Danyang, a position which began to pay benefits following the conquest of Wu by Jin in 280. Sun Kai died in 304.

== See also ==
- Lists of people of the Three Kingdoms
