= Chen Commandery =

Ancient Chinese political subdivision

Chen Commandery (Chinese: 陳郡) was a Chinese commandery that existed from the late Han dynasty to the Sui dynasty. It was located in present-day eastern Henan province.

For much of the Western Han dynasty, the territory was part of the vassal Principality of Huaiyang. In 88 AD, Huaiyang was renamed Chen, and was granted to Liu Xian (劉羨), a son of Emperor Ming; Xian was posthumously known as Prince Jing (敬) of Chen. Xian's descendants held the principality until 197 AD, when the last Prince of Chen was killed by Yuan Shu. The commandery administered 9 counties, including Chen, Yangjia (陽夏), Ningping (寧平), Ku (苦), Zhe (柘), Xinping (新平), Fule (扶樂), Wuping (武平) and Changping (長平). The population was 1,547,572, or 112,653 households. In Cao Wei dynasty, the Principality of Chen was briefly restored, and granted to Cao Zhi, Prince Si (思) of Chen in 232.

The commandery was briefly merged into the Principality of Liang in the early Jin dynasty, but was restored to independence soon after. Chen in this era was known for being the home commandery of the Xie clan, a powerful faction in the imperial court of the Jin with influential members such as Xie An and Xie Xuan. In Northern Wei, the commandery administered 4 counties, including Xiang (項), Changping (長平), Xihua (西華) and Xiangyi (襄邑), and according to the Book of Wei, the population was 7,669, or 3,024 households. The commandery subsequently passed to the Eastern Wei, Northern Qi, Northern Zhou and eventually the Sui dynasty. It was abolished in 583 AD.

== Princes of Chen ==
- Liu Xian (劉羨), Prince Jing (敬) of Chen (88－11 January 97;
- Liu Jun (劉鈞), Prince Si (思) of Chen, January 97－ 13 September 117;
- Liu Song (劉竦), Prince Huai (懷) of Chen, September 117－25 Oct 119;
- Liu Chong (劉崇), Prince Qing (頃) of Chen, 28 May 120－2 April 124;
- Liu Cheng (劉承), Prince Xiao (孝) of Chen, Apr 124－?
- Liu Chong (劉寵), Prince Min (愍) of Chen, ?－197;
- Cao Zhi (曹植), Prince Si (思) of Chen, 232.
- Cao Zhi (曹志), son of Prince Si. His fiefdom was later shifted to Jibei (济北).
