= Battle of Xiangyang (191) =

Battle between warlords Sun Jian and Liu Biao (191)

Coordinates: 32°0′36″N 112°7′19″E

- Part of the wars at the end of the Han dynasty
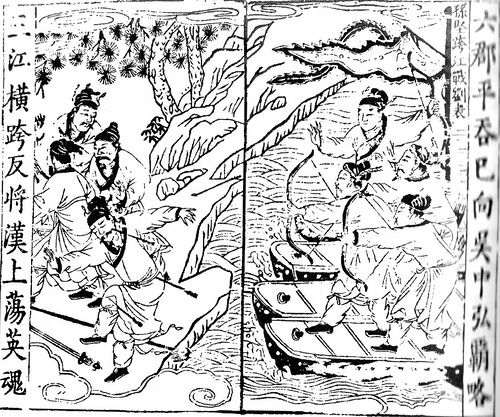
- A Qing dynasty illustration of Sun Jian's forces (right) attacking Liu Biao's forces (left)
Date	191 CE
Location	Xiangyang (present day Xiangyang, Hubei, China)
Result	Liu Biao victory; Sun Jian killed

Belligerents
Liu Biao	Sun Jian

Commanders and leaders
Huang Zu	Sun Jian †

Battle of Xiangyang
- Traditional Chinese: 襄陽之戰
- Simplified Chinese: 襄阳之战
Transcriptions
Standard Mandarin
- Hanyu Pinyin: Xiāngyáng Zhī Zhàn

The Battle of Xiangyang was fought between the warlords Sun Jian and Liu Biao in 191 in the late Eastern Han dynasty. Liu Biao emerged victorious against Sun Jian's forces. Shortly after their coalition had ousted Dong Zhuo from the capital Luoyang, Yuan Shu and Yuan Shao, two feudal lords vying for power, had formed alliances against one another, with Gongsun Zan supporting Yuan Shu while Liu Biao supported Yuan Shao. Yuan Shu sent his subordinate Sun Jian to attack Liu Biao in order to extinguish Yuan Shao's influence in the southern half of China. Although Sun Jian initially outmaneuvered and outfought Liu Biao, he was killed in action and his army forced to retreat.

== Battle ==
Sun Jian and his forces encountered the forces of Liu Biao's general, Huang Zu, between Fancheng and Deng (near present-day Xiangyang). There, he easily routed Huang's forces and surrounded the city of Xiangyang itself. Within the confines of the city, Liu Biao again sent Huang Zu out, this time to make a surprise attack. However, Huang was again defeated, and when he attempted to withdraw to the city once more, Sun Jian cut off his line of retreat, and he fled to Mount Xian. Sun pursued Huang, hoping to follow up on his success. According to Sun Jian's official biography in Records of the Three Kingdoms, he was fatally wounded by an arrow fired by a soldier in Huang Zu's unit, who was hiding in a bamboo grove. Sun's men carried him away from the battlefield and he died from his injury later. Other theories of Sun Jian's death include Sun being killed while fighting in the wilderness, or being crushed to death by boulders rolled down by the enemy from above.

== Aftermath ==
Sun Jian's death effectively ended the battle, although Liu's forces suffered far more casualties. Huan Jie, an official under Sun Jian, successfully negotiated for his lord's corpse to be returned, and Sun Jian's army temporarily came under the control of Sun Jian's nephew, Sun Ben. Sun Ben then went to join Yuan Shu with most of Sun Jian's followers. Sun Ce, Sun Jian's oldest son, was given Sun Jian's marquisate, but chose to pass the position down to his youngest brother, Sun Kuang, who was still young then.

Liu Biao's success allowed him to expand his influence in Jing Province. Though he would be unable to defeat either Sun Ce or his successor, Sun Quan, he would nonetheless remain an influential figure in the Han dynasty until his death in 208. Huang Zu was killed at the Battle of Jiangxia against Sun Quan's forces in the same year.

== In Romance of the Three Kingdoms ==
The battle and its justifications were altered in the 14th-century historical novel Romance of the Three Kingdoms. In this fictionalized account, Sun Jian attacked Liu Biao for revenge because Liu's forces routed his army during his withdrawal from the coalition against Dong Zhuo. Sun Jian's younger brother, Sun Jing, attempted to dissuade him from this course of action, but Sun Jian refused to listen. Sun Jian's oldest son, Sun Ce, was granted a command position and performed well in his first battle.

After initially defeating Huang Zu, Sun Jian's army surrounded Xiangyang. Two commanders under Liu Biao, Chen Sheng (陳生) and Zhang Hu (張虎), were killed by Sun Jian (or in some versions, Sun Ce) and Han Dang, respectively. Sun Jian was killed in a rockslide after being lured into a trap by Lü Gong and Huang Zu, according to a ploy by Liu Biao's advisor Kuai Liang. Sun Jian's generals Huang Gai and Cheng Pu managed to capture Huang Zu and kill Lü Gong, respectively, while Sun Ce was forced to withdraw.

Huan Jie's involvement in recovering Sun Jian's corpse is similar in the novel to the historical account. However, in the novel, Huang Zu was released in exchange for Sun Jian's corpse, when there is no mention of Huang Zu's capture in historical texts.

== In popular culture ==
The Battle of Xiangyang is featured in video games such as Koei's Dynasty Warriors, but the name of the battle changes with almost every release. After Sun Jian is killed, Sun Ce takes command of the army instead of Sun Ben. Sun Jian's death also changes with each game release, as a possible reflection of the confusion as to his actual cause of death.
