= Lady Sun (Sun Jian's sister) =

Lady Sun 孫氏
- Born: Unknown
- Died: Unknown
- Spouse: Xu Zhen
- Issue: Xu Kun
- Father: Sun Zhong

Lady Sun or Sun Shi (孫氏) was a Chinese noblewoman from the late Eastern Han dynasty to the early Three Kingdoms period. She was the sister of the warlord Sun Jian. She was also the mother of Xu Kun, an advisor of the warlord Sun Ce. Sun Quan's concubine Lady Xu was Lady Sun's granddaughter. She is best known for accompanying the army and aiding Sun Ce in his fight against Liu Yao in the Campaign to conquer Jiangdong.

== Genealogy ==
Lady Sun was the daughter of Sun Zhong and the sister of Sun Jian. She married Xu Zhen (徐真), who was a close acquaintance of Sun Jian, leading to the birth of Xu Kun. Lady Sun's son, in his youth, served in provincial and commandery offices, although he left his post to serve Sun Jian in battle as his Lieutenant General, and later became an adviser to Sun Ce. Xu Kun's daughter, Lady Xu was a concubine of Sun Quan, the founder of the Eastern Wu. When Sun Quan was crowned emperor, and Sun Deng (Lady Xu's adopted son) was made his crown prince, the authorities asked Sun Quan to make Lady Xu empress.

== Campaign of Jiangdong ==
After Sun Jian's death, Xu Kun follows his cousin Sun Ce. In 195, Sun Ce led troops to attack Liu Yao, clashing with subordinates, Fan Neng (樊能), Yu Mi (于糜) on the Heng River, and Zhang Ying (張英) on the Danglikou (east of present-day He County, Anhui). At the time, Sun Ce's troops had few military ships, being parked and waiting. Lady Sun was in the army at the time, and proposed a stratagem to Xu Kun; her suggestion to Kun was to build rafts to cross the riverine territory before Zhang Ying's navies could amass. She proposed a surprise attack, advising that if Sun Ce waited too long, it would be harmful. Xu Kun passed Lady Sun's strategy to Sun Ce. The strategy was accepted and Sun Ce secured victory against Liu Yao in his campaign to conquer Jiangdong.

== External sources ==
- Chen, Shou (3rd century). Records of the Three Kingdoms (Sanguozhi).
