= Sun Ben =

Late 2nd/early 3rd century Chinese official and general

- 孫賁

General Who Attacks the Barbarians (征虜將軍) (under Sun Quan)
- In office 208 – ?
- Monarch: Emperor Xian of Han

Administrator of Yuzhang (豫章太守) (under Sun Quan)
- In office 199 – 210
- Monarch: Emperor Xian of Han

Personal details
- Born: Unknown; Fuyang District, Hangzhou, Zhejiang
- Died: 210
- Children: Sun Lin (202 - 249); Sun An; Sun Xi; Sun Ji; Cao Zhang's wife
- Parent: Sun Qiang (father)
- Relatives: See Eastern Wu family trees
- Occupation: General
- Courtesy name: Boyang (伯陽)
- Peerage: Marquis of a Chief Village (都亭侯)

Sun Ben (fl. 180–200s), courtesy name Boyang, was a cousin of Sun Quan, a Chinese warlord who lived during the late Eastern Han dynasty and later became the founding emperor of the state of Eastern Wu in the Three Kingdoms period. He was the eldest son of Sun Qiang, the elder brother of Sun Quan's father Sun Jian. He first served Sun Jian in the campaign against Dong Zhuo. After Sun Jian's death, he took control of the army and went to serve Yuan Shu. He would soon rejoin Sun Ce (Sun Jian's eldest son and successor). He was succeeded by his son Sun Lin (孫鄰).

== Life ==
Sun Ben was the elder son of Sun Qiang (孙羌), the full elder brother of Sun Jian; Ben had a younger brother, Sun Fu. Sun Qiang died early, and so his sons were taken in by their uncle. Sun Ben followed his uncle in battle after Sun Jian's return from Luoyang, and led a unit during Sun Jian's attack on Liu Biao. When Sun Jian died, Sun Ben, being older than Sun Ce, gathered many of the soldiers and generals and went to Yuan Shu, who had been Sun Jian's overlord.

Sun Ben served under Yuan Shu for a time, along with Sun Jian's brother-in-law, Wu Jing (the brother of Sun Jian's wife Lady Wu). He served as Inspector of Yu Province, but the position was mostly nominal, for he was still young. He met Zhou Yu, and joined him to aid Wu Jing, who was under attack from Liu Yao. Sun Ce soon arrived as well, and both Zhou Yu and Sun Ben joined his army. Wu Jing was saved, and Sun Ben was reunited with his family under Yuan Shu.

As a reward for his duties, Sun Ben was made Grand Administrator of Yuzhang Commandery, while Sun Fu was sent to Luling Commandery. When Yuan Shu went out to battle Liu Bei, Sun Ben was assigned to defend Shouchun. When Yuan Shu declared himself emperor, Sun Ben, Wu Jing, Zhou Yu and Lu Su all abandoned him and joined Sun Ce. Sun Ben's wife and children, however, were detained in the city and were unable to join him until later.

In 197, Sun Ce and Lü Bu allied with each other to defeat Yuan Shu. Sun Ben and Sun Fu led the attack against Liu Xun, easily scoring a victory.

In 200, Sun Ce died, and both Sun Ben and Sun Fu were uneasy about the young Sun Quan being his heir, both being his elder. The two were stationed in Yuzhang when Cao Cao began his advance southward. Sun Fu wrote a letter intending to surrender to Cao Cao, but he was stripped of all rank, and his advisors were executed. Sun Ben also was contemplating surrender, but it is said that Zhu Zhi dissuaded him, and he served at the Battle of Red Cliffs. Sun Ben died after serving as Administrator of Yuzhang for 11 years. His son, Sun Lin, succeeded him.

== See also ==
- Lists of people of the Three Kingdoms
