= Kuaiji Commandery =

Historic commandery of China

Kuaiji Commandery (Chinese: t 會稽郡, s 会稽郡, p Kuàijī Jùn), formerly romanized as K'uai-chi Commandery, (Note: Less often, as Kuaiji Prefecture or K'uai-chi Prefecture.) was a former commandery of China in the area of Hangzhou Bay. When first established, its capital was at Wu (present-day Suzhou), which became known as "Kuaiji" from this role. The initial territory ran from the south bank of the Yangtze through most of modern Zhejiang to an indeterminate border among the free people of Minyue. Wu and Wuxing commanderies were later formed between the Yangtze and the north shore of Hangzhou Bay; the administration of the remainder of Kuaiji Commandery was then removed to the site of the former Yue capital in modern Shaoxing's Yuecheng District, which also became known as Kuaiji from this role. By the Tang, Hangzhou was also separated and Kuaiji ran from a little north of the Zhe River in the west to Ningbo in the east.

== Name ==
The commandery was named for Mount Kuaiji. It was a site long important to the area's native Yue people and connected in Chinese legend with Yu the Great, whose putative gravesite was visited by Shi Huangdi in his tours of the Qin Empire. There are various folk etymologies of the Chinese characters, but they probably represent a transcription of a native proto-Wu placename.

== History ==
The commandery was first formed by Shi Huangdi of the Qin to consolidate control over the lands of miscellaneous Baiyue peoples southeast of Chu captured in 222 BC. The initial capital was at Wu (present-day Suzhou) through the Qin and Han dynasties and it was also known as "Kuaiji" from this role. In 209 BC, its governor Yin Tong initiated a plot to rebel against the collapsing Qin but was assassinated and replaced by his conspirators Xiang Liang and Xiang Yu. They employed Kuaiji as a base for their own rebellion, which restored a puppet king to Chu before Xiang Yu's defeat by Han.

During the Han dynasty, an army from Kuaiji Commandery under Han Anguo (t 韓安國, s 韩安国, Hán Ānguó) moved against the Min (Fujianese) in 135 BC. In AD 38, a major plague outbreak assaulted the area. Amid various local cults and practices, the governor Diwu Lun suppressed unauthorized sacrifices, particularly the sacrifice of cattle, as injurious to the area's economic strength.

By the Three Kingdoms period, the capital was restored to its pre-imperial position in present-day Shaoxing. The commandery was conquered by Sun Ce of Wu in 196 and he made its capital his base, assuming the title of governor himself. The area was later troubled by the bandits Lü He (呂合) and Qin Lang (秦狼), who were put down by Jiang Qin; bandits under Pan Lin (潘臨) were put down by Lu Xun. During the period, Yuyao suffered a plague outbreak but its administrator Zhu Huan's deft handling of the situation was credited with an influx of immigrants.

The era of Sun Quan saw migrations from the north and the opening of the Shanyue area and the Zhedong and Jiangnan canals. Textile production expanded, using imported cotton from Shu. Celadon pottery, later developed under the Jin, became more common. The primary centers of industrial production (specifically, ceramics) were at Kuaiji (Shaoxing), Yuyao (within Ningbo), and Shangyu, with secondary centers at Yinxian, Ningbo proper, Fenghua, Linhai, Xiaoshan, Yuhang (present-day Hangzhou), and Huzhou. Kuaiji also had a copper mine which produced mirrors. Trade missions reached Taiwan, Fun'an (south Vietnam), and Manchuria.

The removal of the Jin dynasty to Nanjing in 317 sparked economic growth in the region known at the time as San Wu ("The Three Wus") from the commanderies of Wu, Wuxing, and Kuaiji (which had formerly been located in Wu).

During the Southern Dynasties period, Kuaiji Commandery was the scene of an abortive rebellion by the retired general Wang Jingze (王敬則) against Emperor Ming of Qi in 498. The emperor was able to forestall the involvement of Emperor Gao's grandson Xiao Zike (蕭子恪), marquess of Nankang, by threatening a mass poisoning of his family and General Wang was killed in battle.

It was the capital commandery of Eastern Yangzhou and the richest commandery in the empire during the 6th century.

During the Sui, the Grand Canal reached Hangzhou in Kuaiji Commandery, which accordingly grew in importance. By the Tang, a separate commandery was established for Hangzhou out of Kuaiji's territory north of the Zhe River. Emperor Yang of the Sui ordered a palace to be constructed in Kuaiji in 616.

== Counties ==
- Shanyin County (山陰縣), within present-day Shaoxing
- Wushang County (烏傷縣), around present-day Yiwu
- Yuyao County (餘姚縣), within present-day Ningbo
- Juzhang County (句章縣), within present-day Ningbo
- Xuancheng County (宣城縣)

== Officials ==
Control of the territory was held by officials known in Chinese as taishou (太守, tàishǒu), "governor" or "grand administrator".

Under the Kingdom of Wu and during the Jin dynasty, a number of royals bore the title "Prince of Kuaiji" (t 會稽王, s 会稽王, Kuàijīwáng), notionally elevating the territory to the status of a minor kingdom. In the case of the Jin dynasty, it was a status beneath that of the Prince of Langya but the 6-year-old Sima Yu requested a demotion to it when the greater title precluded him from mourning for his mother. The title was granted on an ad hoc basis and, as it implied no actual administrative control, ran concurrently with the governors.

In a similar fashion, some nobles were created "Duke of Kuaiji" (t 會稽公, s 会稽公, Kuàijīgōng).

=== Governors ===
- . . .
- Yin Tong, –209 BC
- Xiang Liang, 209–208 BC
- . . .
- Diwu Lun (第五倫), c. AD 53–62
- . . .
- Wang Lang, –AD 196
- Sun Ce, 196–200
- Sun Quan, king of Wu, 200–
- . . .
- Chunyu Shi (淳于式)
- . . .
- Wu Can, 222–
- . . .
- Yu Chen (庾琛), 3rd century, father of Empress Mingmu and General Yu of the Jin
- . . .
- Xie Xuan, –388
- . . .
- Liu Dan (劉誕), Prince of Sui, c. 452, brother of Emperor Xiaowu of Song
- . . .
- Liu Zifang (劉子房), Prince of Xunyang, –466, son of Emperor Xiaowu
- . . .
- Xiao Dalian (蕭大連), Duke of Lincheng, c. 549
- . . .

=== Princes ===
- Sun Xiu, c. 252 – c. 258
- Sun Liang, 258–260
- . . .
- Sima Yu, 326–371
- Sima Daozi, the Wenxiao Prince of Kuaiji, 392–403
- . . .
- Chen Zhuang (陳莊), 586–

=== Dukes ===
- Sun Xiu, c. 270–
- Sima Chi, 311–313
- Helian Chang, 428–430

== See also ==
- Yue Prefecture (Zhejiang)
