= Wu Commandery =

Commandery of imperial China

- Traditional Chinese: 吳郡
- Simplified Chinese: 吴郡
Transcriptions
Standard Mandarin
- Hanyu Pinyin: Wú Jùn

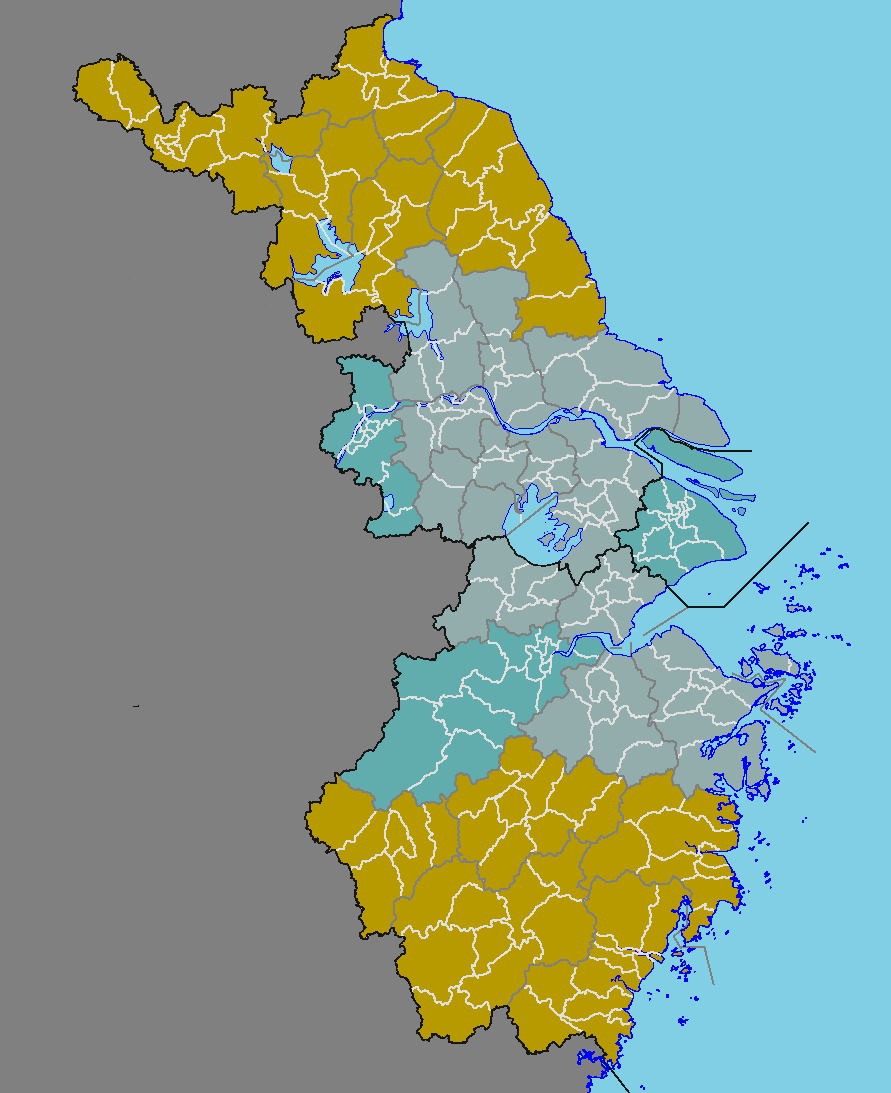
Wu Commandery's territories resemble the pale green part of this map

Wu Commandery was a commandery of imperial China. It covers parts of the contemporary Northern Zhejiang and Southern Jiangsu. The capital of Wu commandery was Wu (today's Suzhou). Major counties of Wu commandery include Wu (county), Yuhang county, and Huating county which later became known as Suzhou, Hangzhou and Shanghai.

== History ==
During its existence, Wu commandery was ruled by various dynasties and regimes. Chronologically, Han dynasty, Eastern Wu, Jin dynasty, Liu Song dynasty, Southern Qi dynasty, Liang dynasty, Chen dynasty, Sui dynasty and Tang dynasty governed Wu commandery in sequence.

In the year of 129, Wu commandery was established during the reign of emperor Shun of Han. When Kuaiji Commandery was divided, lands west of Qiantang river in Kuaiji commandery formed the new Wu commandery. After the division of Kuaiji, Wu constitutes one of the commanderies of Yang Province.

In 195, local strongman and warlord of Fuchun count, Sun Ce, acquired the entire Wu commandery without the authorization of Han dynasty. His family ruled the commandery until 280, first as warlords under the Han and Cao Wei, and after 229 as emperors of the state of Eastern Wu during the Three Kingdoms era. The last ruler of Eastern Wu, Sun Hao divided a part of Wu commandery and formed the new Wuxing Commandery (吴兴郡).

In 548, Military leader Hou Jing started an open rebellion against Emperor Wu of Liang. Wu Commandery was occupied by Hou's army during his rebellion. Local lords Lu Xiang, Lu An and Lu Yingong of Lu clan were defeated. Xiang died out of fear and anger. The rebels caused great damage to the commandery's economy. It was recorded that, in Wu, human bodies were eaten as rations of the rebels.

In 589, Emperor Wen of Sui abolished the commandery system and substituted it with "Zhou" or "Prefecture"(administrative division). Consequently, Wu commandery was renamed as Suzhou. However, In 607, Emperor Yang of Sui re-established Wu commandery.

In 758. Wu commandery was once more renamed Suzhou.

Wu commandery ceased to exist nominally in 758 and continued to exist under the name of Suzhou. Shortly after the An Lushan Rebellion, the imperial court of Tang enforced heavy taxes on the people of Wu commandery since Wu was not invaded by An's army. However, the tax collection became unbearable for the ordinary peasants of the commandery (An amount of tax that was equivalent to 8 years of laboring was demanded). In 762, a low rank officer of Taizhou, Yuan Chao, with angry peasants, stormed and attacked cities of Wu commandery including Suzhou. The Tang court had to pacify Yuan's unexpected rebellion in 763. Yuan was captured by general Li Guangbi and was escorted to the capital Chang'An. He was soon executed under the charge of treason.

== Subordinate counties ==
- Wu County: Administrative centre of Wu commandery. Shares the same name with the commandery. Today's Suzhou.
- Haiyan County: Still exists today under this name as a subordinate county of Jiaxing prefecture-level city. In 549, Hou Jing established Wuyuan Commandery in this county. Shortly afterward, the Wuyuan Commandery was abolished and Haiyan returned to the administration of Wu.
- Wucheng County: Today's Huzhou. In 266, Sun Hao established the Wuxing Commandery which included this county. No longer a part of Wu after 266. It was the capital of Wuxing commandery.
- Yuhang County: Today's Hangzhou. Later formed a part of Wuxing Commandery and thus no longer belonged to Wu.
- Piling County: Today's Changzhou.
- Dantu County: Today's Zhenjiang.
- Qu'e county: Today's Danyang.
- Youquan County: Today's Jiaxing. Changed its name to Jiaxing in 231 according to the decree issued by Sun Quan.
- Fuchun County: Today's Fuyang district of Hangzhou. In 225, this county became a commandery, the Dong'an Commandery. Dong'an was soon abolished in 228.
- Yangxian County: Today's Yixing, later became a part of Wuxing Commandery.
- Wuxi County: Still exists under this name today. Formally joined Wu commandery in 188. Abolished in 234
- Lou County: Today's Kunshan. Abolished before the year of 589. Parts of this county formed Kunshan and Xingyi county.
- Yanguan County: Today's Haining. Originally named Haichang. Established in 223.
- Huating County: Today's Shanghai. Established in 751 by the governor of Wu commandery Zhao Juzhen.

== Functionaries ==
According to the bureaucratic system of Han dynasty, every commandery has an identical hierarchy of functionaries.

The top administrator of Wu Commandery was called the Taishou (the top official of a commandery). In addition, the Taishou had a subordinate Juncheng (a vice Taishou and an assistant of his work). Military affairs were entrusted to the Duwei of a commandery. In terms of counties, a Ling (an officer) was in charge of a county with more than ten thousand registered families or households. A Zhang (an officer) was in charge of a county with a population of less than ten thousand.

In Wu Commandery, many counties reached a relatively large population, and thus were governed by a Ling. Numerous resources proved Wu, Wucheng, Yuhang, Qu'e, Haiyan, Fuchun, Jiaxing, Yangxian to be some of the large counties with a Ling.

During Jin and Southern dynasties, the top officials of commanderies (including Wu commandery) were called Neishi. The Neishi, in practice, did not differ from Taishou in any manner.

== Society ==
Wu was the home of the four clans of Wu (吳郡四姓) . (Note: The four great clans of Wu Commandery were the Gu (顧), Lu (陸), Zhu (朱) and Zhang (張) clans. Some notable members from each clan were: Gu Yong, Gu Shao and Gu Tan of the Gu clan; Lu Xun, Lu Ji and Lu Kai of the Lu clan; Zhu Huan and Zhu Ju of the Zhu clan; and Zhang Wen of the Zhang clan.) In Eastern Wu, the four clans were pillars of Emperor Sun Quan's rule. Wu and Huai-si region's lords together formed two main power blocs of Eastern Wu.

Lu Yun, a nobleman of Wu commandery in Jin dynasty, described his native commandery as a culturally and politically advanced region comparable with Zhongyuan. His assertion was validated by the fact that in the records of the three kingdoms, 28 individuals from Wu commandery were biographized making Wu the most prolific source of historically important figures during the three kingdom period.

In Han dynasty, Wu had become known for its economic wealth. The 3rd century intellectual Zuo Si had written a rhymed prose concerning Wu commandery. Through his prose, researchers had discovered Wu's prosperous agriculture. On the other hand, Chen Shou's records indicated a flourishing commercial society in 3rd century Wu commandery.

During the rule of Eastern Wu, the government planned military-led plantations in Wu commandery. The aim was to provide a logistic base for the armies on the mission of border defense (against Cao Wei).

The Disaster of Yongjia forced numerous northern nobles to flee from their homeland in central plain. These northern lords later settled down in Wu, Kuaiji and other southern commanderies. However, the native four clans' economic, political and social hegemony in Wu was not threatened by Northern immigrants during Jin dynasty.

== See also ==
- Kuaiji Commandery
- Wuxing Commandery
- Danyang Commandery
- Four Clans of Wu
