= Lu Jia (Western Han) =

Chinese philosopher and politician

- 陸賈
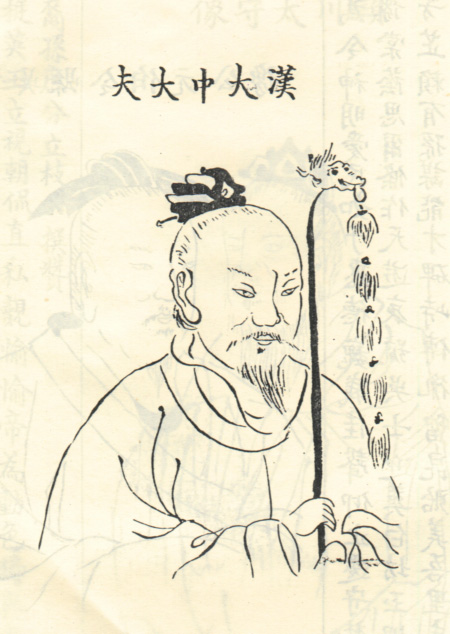

Personal details
- Died: 170 BC
- Relatives: Lu Kang (second cousin 14 times removed); Lu Ji (second cousin 15 times removed); Lu Xun (second cousin 16 times removed); Lu Mao (second cousin 16 times removed); Lu Kang (second cousin 17 times removed); Gu Cheng (second cousin 17 times removed)
- Occupation: Philosopher, politician

Lu Jia (陸賈; died 170 BC) was a Chinese philosopher and politician of the Western Han dynasty. He secured the nominal geopolitical submission of Zhao Tuo's kingdom of Nanyue to Han in 196 BC.

The Book of Han credits him with having converted the Han dynasty founder Liu Bang to Confucianism. An anecdote tells that in an early meeting, Liu scoffed at Lu's scholarly interests with the words "I do all my conquering from the back of my horse, what use have I for the Documents and Odes?" Lu replied, "Once my lord is done with the conquering, does he also intend to do all his ruling from the back of his horse?" This brought Liu to a pause, and he subsequently requested that Lu compose for him a book of historical examples outlining why Qin had lost the support of the world and how Liu himself might gain and retain it. This became the 12-chapter volume known as the Xin Yu (新語; "New Discourses"). This anecdote also appears in the Shiji.

Xin Yu integrates the concepts of yin and yang into a description of benevolent rule and its relation to self-cultivation. This combination of yin and yang with classic Confucian concept of benevolent rule was a precursor to writing of Dong Zhongshu in the Luxuriant Dew of the Spring and Autumn Annals.

== Family ==
During the Warring States period, King Xuan of Qi enfeoffed his youngest son Tian Tong (田通) at Lu (陸; in modern Laoling, Shandong). Tian Tong adopted Lu as his surname, changed full name to Lu Tong (陸通), Lu Jia was a great-great-grandson of Lu Tong.

Lu Jia was a second cousin 16 times removed of Lu Xun, a general of the state of Eastern Wu.
