= Gu Shao =

Official serving warlord Sun Quan (c.188-218)

- 顧邵

Administrator of Yuzhang (豫章太守)
- In office ?–?
- Monarch: Emperor Xian of Han

Personal details
- Born: c. 188 or 185 (Note: Gu Shao's biography in the Sanguozhi recorded that he was 27 (by East Asian age reckoning) when he was appointed as the Administrator of Yuzhang Commandery. He died after holding office for five years. Rafe de Crespigny estimated that Gu Shao died in 218. Since Gu Shao was 30 when he died, by calculation he was born around 188. However, it is possible that Gu Shao became Administrator of Yuzhang in 210/211, as the previous Administrator Sun Ben had died in 210 (per his biography in Sanguozhi), and his son Sun Lin was only 9 years old (by East Asian reckoning) at the time. If Gu Shao became Administrator of Yuzhang in 210/211, then his death year should be in 214/215.)
- Died: c. 218 or 215 (aged 30)
- Spouses: Sun Ce's daughter; Lu Jun's daughter
- Relations: Lu Ji (uncle); Gu Yu (brother); Gu Ji (brother); see also Gu clan of Wu
- Children: Gu Tan; Gu Cheng
- Parents: Gu Yong (father); Lu Kang's daughter (mother)
- Occupation: Official
- Courtesy name: Xiaoze (孝則)

Gu Shao (c. 188 – c. 218), courtesy name Xiaoze, was an official serving under the warlord Sun Quan in the late Eastern Han dynasty of China.

== Family background ==
Gu Shao's ancestral home was in Wu County, Wu Commandery, which is present-day Suzhou, Jiangsu. He was the eldest son of Gu Yong, who later became the second Imperial Chancellor of the state of Eastern Wu in the Three Kingdoms period.

The Gu clan, which he was from, was one of the four most influential clans in Wu Commandery and also in the Jiangdong region at the time. (Note: The four great clans of Wu Commandery were the Gu (顧), Lu (陸), Zhu (朱) and Zhang (張) clans. The four great clans of the Jiangdong region were the Gu (顧), Lu (陸), Yu (虞) and Wei (魏) clans. Some notable members from each clan were: Gu Yong, Gu Shao and Gu Tan of the Gu clan; Lu Xun, Lu Ji and Lu Kai of the Lu clan; Zhu Huan and Zhu Ju of the Zhu clan; Zhang Wen of the Zhang clan; Yu Fan of the Yu clan; and Wei Teng (魏騰) of the Wei clan.)

== Early life ==
Gu Shao was well read in history and he took a keen interest in moral obligations between people. In his youth, he was as famous as his maternal uncle Lu Ji, and was considered to be of higher calibre as compared to other scions of notable families in Wu Commandery, such as Lu Xun, Zhang Dun (張敦) and Bu Jing (卜靜). (Note: Zhang Dun, whose courtesy name was Shufang (叔方), was known for his oratorical talent and virtuous character. He served under Sun Quan as an assistant official and registrar before rising to the position of Prefect of Haihun County (海昏縣; in present-day Nanchang, Jiangxi). He died at the age of 31. Bu Jing, whose courtesy name was Xuanfeng (玄風), served as the Prefect of Shan County (剡縣; present-day Shengzhou, Zhejiang).) Due to his fame and popularity, he attracted many visitors from throughout Wu Commandery and Yang Province who wanted to befriend him or build connections with him.

Gu Shao married a daughter of Sun Ce, the elder brother and predecessor of Sun Quan, the warlord who ruled over the territories in the Jiangdong region in the late Eastern Han dynasty and later became the founding emperor of Eastern Wu in the Three Kingdoms period. He probably also married a sister of Lu Xun and Lu Mao. (Note: The Sanguozhi recorded that Gu Shao's younger son Gu Cheng was a maternal nephew of Lu Mao. This means that Gu Shao probably also married a sister of Lu Mao and Lu Xun.)

== Meeting with Pang Tong ==
When Zhou Yu died in 210, Pang Tong came to Wu Commandery to attend his funeral. As Pang Tong was famous in Wu Commandery, many people came to see him when he was about to leave. During this time, he met and befriended Lu Ji, Gu Shao and Quan Cong, and appraised each of them in turn. Pang Tong described Lu Ji as "a horse that cannot run fast but has strong willpower", and Gu Shao as "an ox that is physically weak but capable of bearing burdens over great distances". Someone then asked Pang Tong: "Does that mean Lu Ji is better than Gu Shao?" Pang Tong replied: "Although a horse can run fast, it can only bear the weight of one person. An ox can travel 300 li a day; it can certainly bear more than just the weight of one person!" Gu Shao later asked Pang Tong: "You are also known for being a good judge of character. Between us, who do you think is the better one?" Pang Tong replied: "I am not as good as you in associating with people and assessing their characters. However, when it comes to politics and strategy, it seems that I am one day ahead of you." Gu Shao agreed with Pang Tong and developed a close bond with him. Before Pang Tong left, Lu Ji and Gu Shao told him: "When peace is restored in the Empire, we want to have a good discussion with you about famous people."

== Career ==
Gu Shao started his career at the age of 26 after Sun Quan appointed him as the Administrator (太守) of Yuzhang Commandery (豫章郡; around present-day Nanchang, Jiangxi). When he reached Yuzhang, he paid his respects at the tomb of the hermit scholar Xu Ruzi and treated Xu Ruzi's descendants well. He also banned unorthodox practices and customs. During his tenure, he identified talents among the junior staff in his administration and sent them for education, in addition to promoting his subordinates to higher positions for good performance. He also made extensive efforts to strengthen education and Confucian culture in Yuzhang Commandery.

Among the various talents he identified and promoted, the more notable ones were Ding Xu (丁諝), Zhang Bing (張秉), Wu Can and Yin Li, all of whom came from humble and lowly backgrounds. Gu Shao earned praise for his good judgment of character when these men later achieved success in their careers: Ding Xu became a high-ranking military officer; Zhang Bing and Yin Li became commandery administrators; Wu Can became a tutor to the crown prince.

Gu Shao was also known for showing care and concern towards his friends and subordinates. When Zhang Bing's father or mother died, Gu Shao donned mourning garments and attended the funeral. On another occasion, when he was leaving Wu Commandery to assume office in Yuzhang Commandery, hundreds of people came to see him off. At the time, Zhang Bing was ill so he could not see Gu Shao off. Gu Shao told the people who came to see him off: "Zhang Bing is sick. He must be thinking that it's a pity that he can't bid me farewell. I will go to him instead. Please wait here for a while. I will be back soon."

Gu Shao died in office after serving as the Administrator of Yuzhang Commandery for five years. He was survived by two sons: Gu Tan and Gu Cheng.

== See also ==
- Lists of people of the Three Kingdoms
