= Lu Yusheng =

Eastern Wu person

Yigū (義姑) Lu Yusheng
- 陸鬱生

Personal details
- Born: 200s or 210s Yulin, Eastern Han Dynasty (present-day China)
- Died: 3rd-century
- Spouse: Zhang Bai
- Parent: Lu Ji (father)

Lu Yusheng (Chinese: 陸鬱生, pinyin: Lù Yùshēng) was a Chinese woman from the Eastern Wu state during the Three Kingdoms period (220-280 AD). She was the daughter of Lu Ji and wife of Zhang Bai. Her loyalty and unwavering courage led to her receiving the honorary title of "Yigū". Her exemplary conduct illuminated the virtuous mores of the time, reshaping the perceptions of men and women. Details of her life were recorded in the Records of the Three Kingdoms, "Biography of Lu Ji".

== Biography ==
Lu Yusheng's family hailed from Wuxian, Yang province; she was the daughter of Lu Ji, with siblings Lu Hong and Lu Rui. She received her given name "Yusheng" due to her birth in Yulin in modern-day Guangxi. From her early childhood, Lu Yusheng exhibited a resolute determination. In 219 CE, following her father's death, she returned to her family's hometown of Wuxian alongside her two brothers. As all three were still very young at the time, they were taken in and cared for by their elder cousin, Lu Mao.

As she grew older, Lu Yusheng parted ways with Lu Mao. At the age of thirteen, Lu Yusheng married Zhang Bai, who hailed from the same county. When Zhang Wen (Zhang Bai's brother) was on his deathbed in c.230, he entrusted household affairs to her sister-in-law, Lu Yusheng. After Zhang Bai became embroiled in political disputes and was subsequently exiled, he died within three months, leaving Lu Yusheng a widow. Despite her financial difficulties, she steadfastly maintained her chastity in memory of her husband and rejected all marriage proposals. She continued to serve Zhang Bai's sisters faithfully.

Later, Yao Xin (Lu Xun's nephew) honored Lu Yusheng with the title "Yigū" (義姑), recognizing her for her unwavering commitment to chastity. This act drew admiration and praise from all quarters.

== Sources ==
- Records of the Three Kingdoms
- Exemplary Acts of Filial Piety and Noble Mothers
- Records of Wujun, Volume Twenty-Seven
