= Zhang Wen (Eastern Wu) =

Official of the state of Eastern Wu (193-230)

- 張溫

General of the Household Who Upholds Righteousness (輔義中郎將)
- In office 224 – 230

Crown Prince's Tutor (太子太傅)
- In office ?–?

Master of Writing in the Selection Bureau (選曹尚書)
- In office ?–?

Consultant (議郎)
- In office ?–?

Personal details
- Born: 193 (Note: Zhang Wen's biography in the Sanguozhi recorded that he was 32 years old (by East Asian age reckoning) when he went to Shu on a diplomatic mission. Sun Quan's biography confirmed that Zhang Wen went in the summer of 224. By calculation, Zhang Wen's birth year should be around 193.) Suzhou, Jiangsu
- Died: 230 (aged 37) (Note: Sun Quan's biography recorded that Zhang Wen was spared from execution in the autumn of 224, while Zhang Wen's biography recorded that he died six years after that. By calculation, Zhang Wen's death year should be around 230.)
- Relations: Zhang Zhi (brother); Zhang Bai (brother); three sisters
- Parent: Zhang Yun (father)
- Occupation: Military general, politician
- Courtesy name: Huishu (惠恕)

Zhang Wen (Note: not to be confused with the Eastern Han official of the same name) (193–230), courtesy name Huishu, was a Chinese military general and politician of the state of Eastern Wu during the Three Kingdoms period of China.

== Family background and early career ==
Zhang Wen was from Wu County, Wu Commandery, which is in present-day Suzhou, Jiangsu. The Zhang clan, which he was from, was one of the four most influential clans in Wu Commandery at the time. (Note: The four great clans of Wu Commandery were the Gu (顧), Lu (陸), Zhu (朱) and Zhang (張) clans. Some notable members from each clan were: Gu Yong, Gu Shao and Gu Tan of the Gu clan; Lu Xun, Lu Ji and Lu Kai of the Lu clan; Zhu Huan and Zhu Ju of the Zhu clan; and Zhang Wen of the Zhang clan.) His father, Zhang Yun (張允), was famous in Wu Commandery for valuing friendship and having a low regard for material wealth. Zhang Yun also served as an assistant officer under the warlord Sun Quan, who became the founding emperor of Eastern Wu later.

At a young age, Zhang Wen was already known for his good moral conduct and for having a dignified appearance. When Sun Quan heard about him, he asked his subjects: "Among his contemporaries, who is Zhang Wen comparable to?" Liu Ji said: "He is comparable to Quan Cong." However, Gu Yong had a different opinion: "Liu Ji doesn't know him well enough. No one is comparable to Zhang Wen." Sun Quan said: "If it is so, Zhang Yun must be still alive." When Zhang Wen was summoned to the Wu court to meet Sun Quan and his subjects, he impressed them with his demeanour and his eloquent responses to their questions. As he was about to leave, Zhang Zhao held his hand and said: "I entrust my plans to you. You should understand what I mean." Zhang Wen was then appointed as a Consultant (議郎) and Master of Writing in the Selection Bureau (選曹尚書). He was promoted to Crown Prince's Tutor (太子太傅) later and was highly regarded by Sun Quan.

== Diplomatic mission to Shu ==
In the summer of 224, when Zhang Wen was 31, he was appointed as General of the Household Who Upholds Righteousness (輔義中郎將) and sent on a diplomatic mission to Wu's ally state, Shu Han. Before he left, Sun Quan told him: "I actually didn't want to send you on this mission. I did so because I was worried that Zhuge Liang might misinterpret my dealings with the Caos. We should work more closely together with Shu after eliminating the threat of the Shanyue. As an envoy, you have a mission to complete but you have no restrictions on what you can say." Zhang Wen replied: "I have never held great responsibilities in the imperial court before, nor do I possess the ability to handle diplomatic affairs well. I am afraid I can neither spread Wu's fame as well as Zhang Zhao did, nor make decisions as well as Zichan. However, Zhuge Liang is wise, discerning and good in long-term planning, so I believe he will definitely understand your intentions and the reasons behind your dealings with Wei. With the blessing of the imperial court, I believe it won't be difficult to understand what Zhuge Liang is looking out for. There is nothing to worry about."

Upon arriving in Shu, Zhang Wen received a warm welcome and was invited to the imperial court to meet the Shu emperor, Liu Shan. He praised Liu Shan for having many talents in his imperial court, and compared him to the Shang dynasty ruler Wu Ding and King Cheng of the Zhou dynasty. He then explained that Wu actually wished to maintain friendly ties with Shu, but had to unwillingly submit to Wei because it lacked the military power to resist Wei. He also expressed his gratitude to the people of Shu for their hospitality. The Shu imperial court was very impressed with him and regarded him highly.

Shortly after he returned to Wu, Zhang Wen was sent to serve in the military garrison in Yuzhang Commandery (豫章郡) but did not do anything significant there.

== Downfall and death ==
Sun Quan was not only unhappy with Zhang Wen for praising the Shu government, but also jealous of his growing popularity. He feared that Zhang Wen would win over the hearts of the people and eventually take over his throne, so he thought of ways to depose Zhang Wen. His opportunity arrived when Zhang Wen was implicated in an incident involving Ji Yan, an official whom Zhang Wen recommended to serve in the Wu government. Ji Yan incurred much resentment from his colleagues when he came up with radical ideas to reform the bureaucracy – a move that would affect over 90 percent of all Wu officials.

In 224, Ji Yan and his colleague Xu Biao (徐彪) were arrested and removed from office based on allegations of unprofessional conduct. They committed suicide later. Zhang Wen was implicated in this incident because he not only recommended Ji Yan, but was also a close friend of both Ji Yan and Xu Biao. Like them, he was removed from office, arrested and imprisoned. (Note: See Ji Yan's article for more details on the incident.)

In September 224, Sun Quan wrote an order listing out Zhang Wen's offences. The order read:

When I recruited Zhang Wen, I deliberately left an appointment vacant for him to fill, and hoped to entrust him with great responsibilities in the future. The way I treated him was much better as compared to how I treated some of my most senior ministers. I never expected that he would turn out to be so evil, treacherous and malicious.

In the past, I held no prejudice against Ji Yan and his family even though I heard that they sided with evil people before, hence I still recruited and promoted them because I wanted to observe how Ji Yan would perform in office. Now, upon closer inspection, I have seen his true colours. He is Zhang Wen's close friend and he follows Zhang's lead. They praise each other and are very close to each other. They found fault with any official who was not part of their clique and came up with excuses to remove him from office.

When I placed Zhang Wen in charge of overseeing the three commanderies and leading the bureaucrats and battle-weary troops there, I feared that war would break out there so I ordered him to evacuate quickly. I even gave him a ceremonial ji to help him exert his authority.

When he was in Yuzhang, he wrote a memorial to me, requesting permission to attack the rebels and other troublemakers in the area. I trusted him, agreed to his request, and sent 5,000 troops from the imperial guards and jiefan corps to help him. Later, when I heard that Cao Pi was personally leading his armies to attack the areas around the Huai and Si rivers, I issued an order ahead of time to Zhang Wen, ordering him to be ready to lead his troops to reinforce me in the event of an emergency. However, Zhang Wen gathered his troops and deployed them in the deep hills instead, and even refused to come to the frontline when I summoned him. It was so fortunate that Cao Pi withdrew his forces, or else the consequences could have been unimaginable.

There was one Yin Li, who was well versed in divination. I invited him to my court but Zhang Wen insisted on bringing him to Shu, introducing him to the Shu court and praising him there. After Yin Li returned to Wu, he was supposed to assume the appointment we had for him, but Zhang Wen let him work in the Imperial Secretariat instead. These arrangements were all done by Zhang Wen.

Zhang Wen also told Jia Yuan that he wanted to promote him to be an Imperial Censor. He then approached Jiang Kang and told him that he would be replacing Jia Yuan. Zhang Wen abused the grace he has received from the imperial court by using it to form his own political clique. It is evident that he acted in bad faith and is capable of behaving in malicious ways.

I cannot bear to see him being executed in public, hence I permit him to return home and continue serving there as a low-ranking official. Oh, Zhang Wen, you are so fortunate to be spared from death.

The general Luo Tong wrote a long memorial to Sun Quan, speaking up for Zhang Wen and attempting to persuade the emperor to pardon Zhang. Sun Quan did not accept his advice.

Zhang Wen died of illness six years after he was deposed.

== Family ==
Zhang Wen had two younger brothers, Zhang Zhi (張祗) and Zhang Bai (張白), who were also known for being talented. They lost their offices along with their brother. Zhang Bai married Lu Ji's daughter, Lu Yusheng (陸鬱生). When Zhang Wen was on his deathbed, he entrusted household affairs to her sister-in-law, Lu Yusheng.

Zhang Wen also three sisters who were known for their good moral conduct. His second sister married Gu Yong's grandson, Gu Cheng. After Gu Cheng's death, she was arranged to be married to a man whose family name was Ding (丁). She committed suicide on her wedding day by consuming poison. The Wu imperial court praised her for remaining loyal to her deceased husband. The people in her hometown drew a portrait of her to commemorate her.

== Appraisal ==
Once, there was a man called Yu Jun (虞俊) from Yuyao County (餘姚縣) who commented on Zhang Wen as follows: "Zhang Huishu is talented but not wise, and flashy but not realistic. Judging from the growing resentment towards him, I foresee that he will meet his downfall one day." Zhuge Liang did not agree with Yu Jun's view initially, but later he praised Yu Jun for having foresight when his prediction came true. He also pondered over the causes of Zhang Wen's downfall for several days before concluding: "I know already. He was too clear when he made distinctions between integrity and corruption, and good and evil."

Chen Shou, who wrote Zhang Wen's biography in the Records of the Three Kingdoms, appraised Zhang Wen as follows: "Zhang Wen was talented and good-looking, but he lacked wisdom and caution. That resulted in him getting into trouble."

Pei Songzhi, who annotated Zhang Wen's biography, remarked that Zhang Wen's downfall was due to his widespread fame, which incurred Sun Quan's jealousy. Zhang Wen's fame was attested by Luo Tong's memorial to Sun Quan, in which Luo Tong mentioned that "Zhang Wen had no equal".

== In Romance of the Three Kingdoms ==
Zhang Wen appeared in Chapter 86 of the 14th-century historical novel Romance of the Three Kingdoms, which romanticises the events before and during the Three Kingdoms period. Sun Quan orders him to accompany Deng Zhi back to Shu after Deng Zhi convinces Sun Quan to reestablish the Wu–Shu alliance against Wei. Zhang Wen meets the Shu emperor Liu Shan. Before he leaves, Liu Shan prepares a farewell banquet for him and orders Zhuge Liang and other senior officials to see him off. During the feast, Zhang Wen debates with the Shu official Qin Mi. Qin Mi responds tactfully to Zhang Wen's questions; Zhang Wen, however, cannot respond to Qin Mi's question. He tells Zhuge Liang later that he is very impressed that Shu has such talents.

== See also ==
- Lists of people of the Three Kingdoms
