= Lu Kang =

Lu Kang may refer to:

- Lu Kang (Han dynasty) (陸康), an official in the late Eastern Han dynasty.
- Lu Kang (Eastern Wu) (陸抗), a general and politician in the state of Eastern Wu during the Three Kingdoms period.
- Lu Kang (diplomat) (born 1968), Chinese diplomat
