= Yin Li (Eastern Wu) =

3rd century state of Eastern Wu official

- 殷禮

Administrator of Lingling (零陵太守)
- In office ?–?
- Monarch: Sun Quan

Personal details
- Born: Unknown Danyang, Jiangsu
- Died: Unknown
- Children: Yin Ji
- Occupation: Official
- Courtesy name: Desi (德嗣)

Yin Li (fl. 220s), courtesy name Desi, was an official of the state of Eastern Wu in the Three Kingdoms period of China.

== Life ==
Yin Li was from Yunyang Commandery (雲陽郡), which is in present-day Danyang, Jiangsu. He came from a humble family background. He was physically weak and not active, but was known for being highly perceptive. He was also well versed in divination. He was a friend of Gu Shao. He served as a minor officer in Yunyang Commandery when he was young. When he was 18, he became an Assistant (丞) in the county office of Wu County (present-day Suzhou, Jiangsu). When Sun Quan was ruling the territories in Jiangdong as the King of Wu from 222–229, he recruited Yin Li to serve as a langzhong (郎中). In the summer of 224, Yin Li accompanied Zhang Wen on a diplomatic mission to Wu's ally state, Shu Han, where they met the Shu chancellor-regent Zhuge Liang, who was very impressed with Yin Li. After returning from Shu, Yin Li was supposed to assume the appointment of langzhong, but Zhang Wen arranged for him to work in the Imperial Secretariat instead. Yin Li became the Administrator (太守) of Lingling Commandery (零陵郡; around present-day Yongzhou, Hunan) later in his career. He died in office.

== Family ==
Yin Li's son, Yin Ji (殷基), served as the Area Commander (督) of Wunan County (無難縣) and was known for being a talented writer. He wrote the Tongyu (通語). Yin Ji's son, Yin Ju (殷巨), whose courtesy name was Yuanda (元大), served as a Lieutenant-General (偏將軍) in Wu. He became the Administrator of Cangwu Commandery (蒼梧郡) later. Yin Ji's younger son, Yin You (殷祐), whose courtesy name was Qingyuan (慶元), served as the Administrator of Wu Commandery. (Note: Yin You was later recommended by Gu Rong to serve under Sima Rui (Emperor Yuan of Jin).)

== See also ==
- Lists of people of the Three Kingdoms
