= Ji Yan =

Ji Yan may refer to:

- King Nan of Zhou (died 256 BC), personal name Ji Yan
- Ji Yan (Eastern Wu) (died 224), Eastern Wu official
