= Lu Kang (Han dynasty) =

Han dynasty politician (126–195)

- 陸康

Administrator of Lujiang (廬江太守)
- In office ? – 195
- Monarch: Emperor Xian of Han
- Succeeded by: Liu Xun

Administrator of Le'an (樂安太守)
- In office ?–?
- Monarchs: Emperor Ling of Han / Emperor Xian of Han

Administrator of Guiyang (桂陽太守)
- In office ?–?
- Monarch: Emperor Ling of Han

Administrator of Wuling (武陵太守)
- In office 178 – ?
- Monarch: Emperor Ling of Han

Personal details
- Born: 126 (Note: Lu Kang's biography in the Houhanshu mentioned that Lu Kang died at the age of 70 (by East Asian age reckoning) about a month after the successful siege of Lujiang. The siege of Lujiang, which is considered part of Sun Ce's conquests in Jiangdong, ended around 195. By calculation, Lu Kang's birth year should be around 126. Vol.61 of Zizhi Tongjian dated Lujiang's fall to 194 (1st year of the Xingping era).) Suzhou, Jiangsu
- Died: 195 (aged 69) Lu'an, Anhui
- Children: Lu Jun; Lu Ji; Gu Yong's wife
- Parent: Lu Bao (father)
- Relatives: Lu Jia (second cousin 14 times removed); Lu Xun (grandnephew); Lu Mao (grandnephew); Gu Cheng's mother (grandniece)
- Occupation: Politician
- Courtesy name: Jining (季寧)

Lu Kang (Chinese: 陸康; 126 – 195), courtesy name Jining, was an administrator of Lujiang during the late Eastern Han dynasty until his death in 195.

== Life ==
Lu Kang was born during the reign of Emperor Shun of Han. He was from Wu County, Wu Commandery, which is in present-day Suzhou, Jiangsu. His grandfather, Lu Xu (陸續), served as a minor officer in a commandery in the early Eastern Han dynasty. When the prince Liu Ying plotted to overthrow Emperor Ming, Lu Xu was implicated, arrested and tortured. Emperor Ming eventually pardoned Lu Xu but placed him under permanent house arrest. Lu Xu died of old age. Lu Kang's father, Lu Bao (陸襃), had a reputation for his morally upright character. The Han government repeatedly asked Lu Bao to join the civil service but he refused. Lu Kang's ancestor Tian Tong (田通), a son of King Xuan of Qi, King Xuan enfeoffed Tian Tong at Lu (陸; in modern Laoling, Shandong), Tian Tong adopted Lu as his surname. Lu Kang was a second cousin 14 times removed of Lu Jia, a Western Han philosopher. (Note: Although the family tree of Lu clan recorded in the New Book of Tang did not mention Lu Kang, but it mentioned Lu Kang's grandnephew Lu Xun.)

Lu Kang was already known for being virtuous and diligent at a young age. He was nominated by Wu Commandery's Administrator, Li Su (李肅), as a xiaolian (civil service candidate), and was appointed as a minor officer in Wu Commandery. After Li Su was executed in c.November 162 for defeat in battle, Lu Kang collected Li's body, brought it back to Li's home in Yingchuan Commandery (潁川郡) for burial, and mourned Li's death. Zang Min (臧旻 (Note: Zang Min rose to prominence while quelling Xu Chang's rebellion.)), the Inspector of Yang Province, nominated him as a maocai (茂才), so Lu Kang was appointed as the Prefect (令) of Gaocheng County (高成縣; around present-day Yanshan County, Hebei). Gaocheng County was very remote and its security was poor. Every household in the county was armed with bows and arrows. When the previous Prefects entered office, they made the locals build and repair the city walls. After arriving in Gaocheng County, Lu Kang freed the labourers and governed the county so well that the people were very pleased with him and even criminal activity ceased in the county. The commandery office reported Lu Kang's achievements to the Han imperial court. In 178, during the reign of Emperor Ling, Lu Kang was promoted to serve as the Administrator (太守) of Wuling Commandery (武陵郡; around present-day Changde, Hunan). Later, he was reassigned to be the Administrator of Guiyang (桂陽; around present-day Chenzhou, Hunan) and Le'an (樂安; around present-day Zibo, Shandong) commanderies. He governed his jurisdictions well.

Around the time, Emperor Ling wanted to build bronze statues but realised that the imperial treasury was unable to support his spending, so he issued a decree to increase taxes and recruit labour from the masses. Lu Kang observed that the people were already suffering from natural disasters such as floods and droughts, so he wrote a memorial to Emperor Ling, advising him against constructing the bronze statues and urging him to relieve the people's burdens. The eunuchs (Emperor Ling's close aides) accused Lu Kang of defaming the emperor and showing disrespect in the memorial, so Lu was arrested and brought to the office of the Minister of Justice (廷尉) for questioning. Liu Dai, an Imperial Clerk (侍御史), carefully examined Lu Kang's case and wrote to the imperial court to explain matters for Lu and clear his name. Lu Kang was released but was dismissed from office and sent home. However, not long later, he was recalled to the court to serve as a Consultant (議郎).

Around 180, Huang Rang (黃穰), a bandit chief from Lujiang Commandery (廬江; around present-day Lu'an, Anhui), allied with tribals from Jiangxia Commandery (江夏; around present-day Xinzhou District, Wuhan, Hubei) and formed an army of over 100,000 men. They attacked and conquered four counties in the region. After Lu Kang assumed office as the Administrator of Lujiang Commandery, he was tasked with suppressing Huang Rang's rebellion. While in office, he upheld law and order and succeeded in defeating Huang Rang and forcing Huang's forces into surrender. He received praise from the imperial court for his achievement. By the time Emperor Xian came to the throne in the 190s, the Han Empire was already in a state of chaos as the central government was weak and various warlords were fighting for power. Lu Kang was aware of the high risks involved in paying tribute to the emperor, because his convoy might be attacked and robbed along the way to the capital. In spite of this, he ordered his men to escort the tribute to the capital and they succeeded. Emperor Xian issued a decree to praise Lu Kang, promote him to General of Loyalty and Righteousness (忠義將軍), and increase his income to 2,000 dan (石).

Around the time, the warlord Yuan Shu had garrisoned his forces in Shouchun (壽春; present-day Shou County, Anhui) and was planning to attack Xu Province. When he realised he was running short of supplies, he sent a messenger to Lujiang Commandery to request 30,000 hu (斛) of grain from Lu Kang. Lu Kang saw Yuan Shu as a traitor and refused to have any contact with him. He also fortified Lujiang's defences and prepared for war. Yuan Shu was angered and he sent Sun Ce to lead an army to attack Lujiang Commandery. Sun Ce had a personal vendetta against Lu Kang because he once visited Lu, but Lu refused to meet him in person, and instead sent a Registrar (主簿) to meet him. Sun Ce's forces besieged Lujiang Commandery but Lu Kang's troops held their ground. Some of Lu Kang's subordinates and soldiers who were on leave returned to Lujiang Commandery and made their way back into the city under the cover of night to help Lu Kang defend the city. Lujiang Commandery fell to Sun Ce's forces after a siege that lasted two years. Lu Kang died of illness at the age of 70 (by East Asian age reckoning) about a month after the successful siege. As his son Lu Ji was still young, his grandnephew Lu Xun became the new head of the Lu clan.

== Family and relatives ==
Lu Kang's family and kin comprised some 100 members. Over half of them died of starvation or in war during the chaos towards the end of the Han dynasty.

Lu Kang had two known sons. The elder one, Lu Jun (陸儁), was appointed as a Gentleman (郎中) by the Han imperial court in recognition of Lu Kang's unwavering loyalty to the Han Empire during the siege of Lujiang. The younger one, Lu Ji, was a scholar who came to serve under the warlord Sun Quan as the Administrator of Yulin Commandery (鬱林郡). Lu Ji was also one of the 24 Filial Exemplars. Lu Kang also had a daughter who married Gu Yong. (Note: The Sanguozhi recorded that Gu Shao, Gu Yong's eldest son, was equally famous as his maternal uncle Lu Ji in his youth. If Lu Ji was a maternal uncle of Gu Shao, that means Gu Yong married Lu Ji's sister and hence Gu Yong's father-in-law was Lu Ji's father, Lu Kang.)

One of Lu Kang's grandsons, Lu Shang (陸尚), was also appointed as a Gentleman (郎中) by the Han court in recognition of Lu Kang's success in suppressing Huang Rang's rebellion.

Lu Kang was a granduncle of Lu Xun. He raised Lu Xun, who was orphaned at a young age. When Yuan Shu's forces (led by Sun Ce) were about to attack Lujiang, Lu Kang sent Lu Xun and his family members back to their home in Wu County for their safety. After Lu Kang's death, Lu Xun became the new head of the family because he was much older than Lu Kang's son Lu Ji, even though Lu Ji was one generation older than him.

== See also ==
- Lists of people of the Three Kingdoms
- Sun Ce's conquests in Jiangdong
