= Gu Cheng (Eastern Wu) =

3rd-century Chinese Three Kingdoms general

- 顧承

Capital Superintendent (京下督)
- In office 241 – 245

General of Vehement Might (奮威將軍)
- In office 241 – 245

Palace Attendant (侍中)
- In office ? – 241

General of the Household of Righteous Illustriousness (昭義中郎將)
- In office ? – 241

Commandant of the West Section of Wu Commandery (吳郡西部都尉)
- In office ?–?

Cavalry Commandant (騎都尉)
- In office ?–?
- Monarch: Sun Quan

Personal details
- Born: Unknown Suzhou, Jiangsu
- Died: Unknown Hanoi, Vietnam
- Relations: Gu Tan (brother); see also Gu clan of Wu
- Parents: Gu Shao (father); Lu Xun's sister (mother)
- Occupation: General
- Courtesy name: Zizhi (子直)

Gu Cheng (fl.232 to 240s), courtesy name Zizhi, was a military general of the state of Eastern Wu during the Three Kingdoms period of China.

== Family background ==
Gu Cheng's ancestral home was in Wu County, Wu Commandery, which is present-day Suzhou, Jiangsu. The Gu clan, which he was from, was one of the four most influential clans in Wu Commandery and also in the Jiangdong region at the time. (Note: The four great clans of Wu Commandery were the Gu (顧), Lu (陸), Zhu (朱) and Zhang (張) clans. The four great clans of the Jiangdong region were the Gu (顧), Lu (陸), Yu (虞) and Wei (魏) clans. Some notable members from each clan were: Gu Yong, Gu Shao and Gu Tan of the Gu clan; Lu Xun, Lu Ji and Lu Kai of the Lu clan; Zhu Huan and Zhu Ju of the Zhu clan; Zhang Wen of the Zhang clan; Yu Fan of the Yu clan; and Wei Teng (魏騰) of the Wei clan.)

Gu Cheng's father, Gu Shao, served as the Administrator (太守) of Yuzhang Commandery (豫章郡; around present-day Nanchang, Jiangxi) under the warlord Sun Quan in the late Eastern Han dynasty. Gu Cheng's grandfather, Gu Yong, was the second Imperial Chancellor of the state of Eastern Wu, founded by Sun Quan in the Three Kingdoms period after the fall of the Eastern Han dynasty. Gu Cheng's mother was a sister of Lu Mao and Lu Xun, the third Imperial Chancellor of Eastern Wu. (Note: The Sanguozhi recorded that Gu Cheng was a maternal nephew of Lu Mao. This means that Gu Cheng's mother was a sister of Lu Mao and Lu Mao's brother Lu Xun.)

== Life ==
Gu Cheng started his career in the Jiahe era (232–238) of Sun Quan's reign when he, along with his maternal uncle Lu Mao, were offered positions in the Eastern Wu government. Sun Quan wrote to Gu Cheng's grandfather Gu Yong: "Your grandson Zizhi is well known for his talent. After I met him, I realised that he is more talented than what I heard about him. You should be proud of him."

Sun Quan thus commissioned Gu Cheng as a cavalry commandant (騎都尉) and appointed him as a commander of the Yulin (羽林; "feathered forest") imperial guards. Gu Cheng was later reassigned to the position of commandant of the West Section of Wu Commandery (吳郡西部都尉). During this time, he joined the Wu general Zhuge Ke in pacifying the rebellious Shanyue tribes and succeeded in recruiting 8,000 elite troops from among the Shanyue. After he returned to a garrison at Zhangkeng (章阬), he was promoted to the rank of general of the Household under the title "General of the Household of Righteous Illustriousness" (昭義中郎將). He was also concurrently appointed as a Palace Attendant (侍中).

In the summer of 241, the Wu general Quan Cong led Wu forces into battle at Quebei (芍陂; south of present-day Shou County, Anhui) against Wei forces led by Wang Ling. The battle did not go well for the Wu side initially, and they lost five units to the Wei forces. Gu Cheng and his friend Zhang Xiu, who were serving in the Wu army at the time, led their units to resist the Wei forces and managed to halt their advance. Quan Cong's eldest son Quan Xu (全緒) and relative Quan Duan (全端), who were also serving in the Wu army, led their troops to attack the Wei forces after they stopped advancing, and succeeded in driving them back.

After the battle, when Sun Quan was giving rewards to his officers, he deemed Gu Cheng and Zhang Xiu's contributions greater than those of Quan Xu and Quan Duan because he believed that it was more difficult to halt the enemy advance than to drive back the enemy. As a result, he promoted Gu Cheng and Zhang Xiu to the rank of general, while Quan Xu and Quan Duan were respectively promoted to lieutenant-general and major-general only. Due to this incident, the Quans bore a grudge against Gu Cheng and Zhang Xiu and, by extension, against Gu Cheng's brother Gu Tan as well. Gu Cheng held the rank of general under the title "General of Vehement Might" (奮威將軍) along with the appointment of Capital Superintendent (京下督).

The Quans later found an opportunity to report Gu Cheng, Zhang Xiu and Gu Cheng's brother Gu Tan for committing serious offences. They claimed that Gu Cheng and Zhang Xiu had secretly collaborated with Chen Xun (陳恂), a staff officer in the Wu army during the Battle of Quebei, to make false submissions about their contributions during the battle. As a result, Gu Cheng and Zhang Xiu were arrested and thrown into prison, while Gu Cheng's brother Gu Tan was implicated in the case because of his relationship with them. Sun Quan was reluctant to find them guilty so he thought of a plan to appease the Quans without convicting the Gu brothers and Zhang Xiu.

During an imperial court session, Sun Quan ordered Gu Tan to publicly apologise for the mistake. He expected Gu Tan to do so, after which he could then pardon and release the three of them. However, Gu Tan refused to apologise and he told Sun Quan: "Your Majesty, how can you let baseless accusations have their way?" Later on, an official accused Gu Tan of showing great disrespect towards the emperor when he protested his innocence, and argued that Gu Tan should be punished by execution. Sun Quan took into consideration that Gu Tan's grandfather Gu Yong had rendered meritorious service in the past, and decided to reduce Gu Tan's punishment from execution to exile.

Gu Cheng, along with his brother Gu Tan and Zhang Xiu, were exiled to the remote Jiao Province in the south. He died in exile in Jiaozhi (around present-day Hanoi, Vietnam) at the age of 36.

== See also ==
- Lists of people of the Three Kingdoms
