= Zhu Huan =

Eastern Wu general (177–238)

- 朱桓

General of the Vanguard (前將軍)
- In office 229 – 238
- Monarch: Sun Quan
- Chancellor: Gu Yong

Governor of Qing Province (青州牧) (nominal)
- In office 229 – 238
- Monarch: Sun Quan
- Chancellor: Gu Yong

General Who Uplifts Military Might (奮武將軍)
- In office 223 – 229
- Monarch: Sun Quan
- Chancellor: Sun Shao (until 225); Gu Yong (from 225)

Chancellor of Pengcheng (彭城相) (nominal)
- In office 223 – 229
- Monarch: Sun Quan
- Chancellor: Sun Shao (until 225); Gu Yong (from 225)

Personal details
- Born: 177 Suzhou, Jiangsu
- Died: 238 (aged 61)
- Children: Zhu Yi
- Occupation: General
- Courtesy name: Xiumu (休穆)
- Peerage: Marquis of Jiaxing (嘉興侯)

Zhu Huan (177–238), courtesy name Xiumu, was a military general of the state of Eastern Wu during the Three Kingdoms period of China. Although he started his career early under the warlord Sun Quan, he did not receive any important responsibilities until after the Battle of Jiangling in 209. Since then, Zhu Huan had taken charge of some local defences and successfully quelled a few rebellions. Between 222 and 225, when Cao Pi, the emperor of Wu's rival state Wei, launched a three-pronged invasion of Wu, Sun Quan appointed Zhu Huan as a military commander to resist the Wei invaders. Zhu Huan defeated the Wei general Cao Ren at the Battle of Ruxu (222–223).

== Early life ==
Zhu Huan was from Wu County, Wu Commandery, which is in present-day Suzhou, Jiangsu. The Zhu clan, which he was from, was one of the four most influential clans in Wu Commandery at the time. (Note: The four great clans of Wu Commandery were the Gu (顧), Lu (陸), Zhu (朱) and Zhang (張) clans. Some notable members from each clan were: Gu Yong, Gu Shao and Gu Tan of the Gu clan; Lu Xun, Lu Ji and Lu Kai of the Lu clan; Zhu Huan and Zhu Ju of the Zhu clan; and Zhang Wen of the Zhang clan.) He started his career under the warlord Sun Quan, who controlled the territories in the Jiangdong region in the late Eastern Han dynasty, and was appointed as the Chief (長) of Yuyao County (餘姚縣) during this time.

When a plague broke out in Yuyao County and caused the prices of provisions to skyrocket, Zhu Huan opened the county office's granary and distributed food supplies to the people. At the same time, he also ordered his subordinates to distribute medical supplies to the people affected by the plague. As a result, Zhu Huan gained the respect and recognition from the local population. Later on, Sun Quan appointed him as a Colonel (校尉) to lead 2,000 troops to find the people who had scattered earlier to avoid the plague. Zhu Huan succeeded in his mission and managed to resettle 10,000 people in Wu and Kuaiji commanderies after some years of effort.

== Middle career ==
From the late 200s to around 222, Zhu Huan did not receive any important responsibilities while most of Sun Quan's other military officers actively participated in battles against rival warlords, particularly Cao Cao, the warlord who controlled the Han central government and the lands north of the Yangtze River. During this time, he quelled rebellions in Danyang (丹楊) and Poyang (鄱陽) commanderies while his colleagues were fighting at the frontlines. In recognition of Zhu Huan's success in suppressing the revolts, Sun Quan enfeoffed Zhu Huan as the Marquis of Xincheng Village (新城亭候) and promoted him to the rank of Major-General (裨將軍).

== Battle of Ruxu ==
In 222, Zhu Huan succeeded Zhou Tai as the area commander of the fortress at Ruxu (濡須), a strategic location at the border along the Yangtze River between Eastern Wu and its rival state Cao Wei. Around the time, the Wei emperor Cao Pi had launched a three-pronged invasion of Wu and ordered his general Cao Ren to lead the attack on Ruxu.

Cao Ren purposefully leaked the news that he would attack Xianxi (羨溪) with the intention of diverting the defenders' attention away from Ruxu fortress. Zhu Huan fell for Cao Ren's ruse and sent the bulk of his troops eastward to reinforce Xianxi. At the same time, Cao Ren led his several tens of thousands troops to attack Ruxu, where Zhu Huan had only 5,000 troops to guard the fortress. The defenders were afraid because they were outnumbered, so Zhu Huan told them, "Whenever two armies fight, the outcome is determined by the commanders' will and not the size of the army. You have heard of Cao Ren's military reputation, so what do you think of his ability compared to mine? Military doctrine says that an invading force should be double the size of a defending force when they fight on flat ground. The condition is that the defenders are not in a fortress and the morale on both sides are equal. Now, Cao Ren is neither wise nor brave, his soldiers are fainthearted, and they are exhausted after travelling a thousand li. On the other hand, we occupy a high-walled fortress, which sits to the north of a river and south to a mountain. The situation is advantageous to us; we shall prevail over the tired invaders. We will win a hundred battles if a situation like this recurs a hundred times. We should have no fear even if Cao Pi comes here personally, so why should we worry about the likes of Cao Ren?"

Zhu Huan then ordered his subordinates to hide the flags and drums to generate an illusion they were weak, so as to lure Cao Ren to attack. Cao Ren sent his son, Cao Tai, to lead the main forces to approach the fortress and ordered Chang Diao and Wang Shuang to launch a sneak attack on Zhongzhou (an island in the middle of the river), where the defenders' families resided. Zhu Huan sent Yan Gui (嚴圭) to Zhongzhou to lay traps there, while he led the remaining troops out to battle Cao Tai. Chang Diao and Wang Shuang fell into an ambush and attempted to retreat, but their ships had been captured by the Wu forces so they could not head back. Chang Diao was killed in action while Wang Shang was captured. 1,000 Wei soldiers drowned when they attempted to flee, while the rest of the detachment were trapped. Outside Ruxu fortress, Zhu Huan repelled Cao Tai's attack and managed to infiltrate the enemy and burn down their camps. In recognition of Zhu Huan's achievements in the battle, Sun Quan promoted him to General of Uplifting Martial Might (奮武將軍), granted him the title "Marquis of Jiaxing" (嘉興侯), and appointed him as the nominal Chancellor of Pengcheng Commandery.

== Battle of Shiting ==
Six years later, Zhu Huan participated in the Battle of Shiting as a subordinate under the command of Lu Xun. Zhu Huan once proposed to Lu Xun that they could easily capture the enemy general Cao Xiu by blocking the latter's retreat route with only 10,000 troops under his command. Lu Xun rejected Zhu Huan's plan and assigned him with 30,000 men to attack the enemy's flank. When Cao Xiu showed up at Shiting with 100,000 troops, Zhu Huan and Quan Cong led their men to attack Cao Xiu's left and right flanks while Lu Xun attacked when the enemy was thrown into disarray. Cao Xiu's troops scattered and their casualty count hit tens of thousands.

== Appraisal and death ==
Zhu Huan as a man always wanted to be the leader and was ashamed when he was put under the order of others. When he was in battle and couldn't act as he wanted, he would be enraged and indignant. However, he valued righteousness and when he died in 238 at the age of 62 (by East Asian age reckoning), his family was so poor that Sun Quan had to provide financial aid to them to hold a decent funeral for Zhu Huan. This was because when Zhu Huan was still alive, he often used his personal wealth to help his subordinates and their (extended) families, which was why his family did not own much property and wealth by the time of his death. When his army learned that his illness was serious, all of them were worried and distraught. When he died, his soldiers along with their families greatly mourned him. Zhu Huan's son, Zhu Yi, inherited his father's marquis title and served as a military officer in the Wu army.

== See also ==
- Lists of people of the Three Kingdoms
