= Lu Xun (Eastern Wu) =

Eastern Wu general and politician (183-245)

- 陸遜

Imperial Chancellor (丞相)
- In office January or February 244 (Note: Sun Quan's biography in the Sanguozhi recorded that Lu Xun became Imperial Chancellor in the 1st month of the 7th year of the Chiwu era of Sun Quan's reign. This month corresponds to 27 January to 25 February 244 in the Gregorian calendar.) – 19 March 245 (Note: Lu Xun's grandson Lu Yun wrote in his "Eulogy to Master Lu, late Chancellor of Wu" (《吳故丞相陸公誄》) that Lu Xun died on the yimao day in the 2nd month of the 8th year of the Chiwu era of Sun Quan's reign. This date corresponds to 19 March 245 in the Gregorian calendar.)
- Monarch: Sun Quan
- Preceded by: Gu Yong
- Succeeded by: Bu Zhi

Senior General-in-Chief (上大將軍)
- In office 229 – January or February 244
- Monarch: Sun Quan
- Succeeded by: Lü Dai

Right Protector-General (右都護)
- In office 229 – January or February 244
- Monarch: Sun Quan

Grand Chief Controller (大都督)
- In office 228
- In office 222 – 223
- Monarch: Sun Quan

General Who Assists the State (輔國將軍)
- In office 222 – 229
- Monarch: Sun Quan

Governor of Jing Province (荊州牧)
- In office 222 – 229
- Monarch: Sun Quan

General Who Guards the West (鎮西將軍)
- In office 219 – 222

Personal details
- Born: 183 (Note: Lu Xun's grandson Lu Yun wrote in his "Eulogy to Master Lu, late Chancellor of Wu" (《吳故丞相陸公誄》) that Lu Xun died on the yimao day in the 2nd month of the 8th year of the Chiwu era of Sun Quan's reign. This date corresponds to 19 March 245 in the Gregorian calendar. Lu Xun's biography in the Sanguozhi also recorded that he was 63 (by East Asian age reckoning) when he died. By calculation, Lu Xun was born in 183.) Wu County, Wu Commandery, Han Empire (present-day Suzhou, Jiangsu)
- Died: 19 March 245 (aged 62) Wuchang, Eastern Wu (present-day Ezhou, Hubei)
- Spouse: Lady Yu Lady Sun Lady Sun
- Children: Lu Yan; Lu Kang
- Parent: Lu Jun (father)
- Relatives: Lu Mao (brother); Gu Cheng's mother (sister); Lu Jia (second cousin 16 times removed); Lu Kang (granduncle); Lu Ji (second cousin once removed); Lu Kai (same generation cousin's son); Lu Yin (same generation cousin's son)
- Occupation: Military general, politician
- Courtesy name: Boyan (伯言)
- Posthumous name: Marquis Zhao (昭侯)
- Peerage: Marquis of Jiangling (江陵侯)
- Original name: Lu Yi (陸議)

Lu Xun (183 – 19 March 245), courtesy name Boyan, also sometimes called Lu Yi, was the third Imperial Chancellor of the state of Eastern Wu during the Three Kingdoms period of China. He began his career as an official under the warlord Sun Quan in the 200s during the late Eastern Han dynasty and steadily rose through the ranks. In 219, he helped Sun Quan's general Lü Meng invade Jing Province, which led to the defeat and death of Liu Bei's general Guan Yu. In 222, he served as the field commander of the Wu army in the Battle of Xiaoting against Liu Bei's forces and scored a decisive victory over the opponent. Lu Xun reached the pinnacle of his career after this battle as Sun Quan regarded him more highly, promoted him to higher positions, and bestowed upon him unprecedented honors.

Throughout the middle and later parts of his career, Lu Xun oversaw both civil and military affairs in Wu while occasionally participating in battles against Wu's rival state, Wei. In his final years, Lu Xun was drawn into a succession struggle between Sun Quan's sons and fell out of Sun Quan's favor as a consequence. He managed to retain his appointment as Imperial Chancellor—an office he assumed in 244—but died a year later in frustration. Lu Xun's role in the Wu government was likened to that of a custos morum, as he believed firmly in and upheld Confucian principles and practices. On the one hand, he provided constant and timely advice to Sun Quan to exercise benevolence and consider the people's welfare. On the other, he vehemently objected to Sun Quan's idea of replacing his legitimate heir apparent in favor of a younger son.

== Family background ==
Lu Xun's original given name was "Yi" (議), hence he was sometimes referred to as "Lu Yi" in older historical records. He was born in a family of high social status in Wu County, Wu Commandery, which is present-day Suzhou, Jiangsu. His grandfather Lu Yu (陸紆) and father Lu Jun (陸駿) served as officials in the government of the Eastern Han dynasty. (Note: (陸氏世頌曰：遜祖紆，字叔盤，敏淑有思學，守城門校尉。父駿，字季才，淳懿信厚，為邦族所懷，官至九江都尉。) Lu Shi Shisong annotation in Sanguozhi vol. 58.) The Lu clan, which he was from, was one of the four most influential clans in Wu Commandery and also in the Jiangdong region at the time. (Note: The four great clans of Wu Commandery were the Gu (顧), Lu (陸), Zhu (朱) and Zhang (張) clans. The four great clans of the Jiangdong region were the Gu (顧), Lu (陸), Yu (虞) and Wei (魏) clans. Some notable members from each clan were: Gu Yong, Gu Shao and Gu Tan of the Gu clan; Lu Xun, Lu Ji and Lu Kai of the Lu clan; Zhu Huan and Zhu Ju of the Zhu clan; Zhang Wen of the Zhang clan; Yu Fan of the Yu clan; and Wei Teng (魏騰) of the Wei clan.) Lu Xun's Lu clan were descendants of Tian Tong (田通), a son of King Xuan of Qi, King Xuan enfeoffed Tian Tong at Lu (陸; in modern Laoling, Shandong), Tian Tong adopted Lu as his surname. Lu Xun was a second cousin 16 times removed of Lu Jia, a Western Han philosopher.

As he was orphaned at a young age, Lu Xun was raised by his granduncle, Lu Kang (陸康), who served as the Administrator (太守) of Lujiang Commandery (廬江郡) under the Han government. Lu Kang was originally on friendly terms with the warlord Yuan Shu, but relations between them soured after Lu Kang broke ties with Yuan Shu when the latter declared himself emperor – an act deemed treasonous against the Han emperor. When Lu Kang heard that Yuan Shu was planning to attack Lujiang Commandery, he immediately sent Lu Xun and his relatives back to Wu Commandery for their safety. After Lu Kang died from illness during the siege of Lujiang, Lu Xun became the new head of the Lu family because he was older than Lu Ji (Lu Kang's son) in terms of age, (Note: (陸遜字伯言，吳郡吳人也。本名議，世江東大族。 ... 遜少孤，隨從祖廬江太守康在官。袁術與康有隙，將攻康，康遣遜及親戚還吳。遜年長於康子績數歲，為之綱紀門戶。) Sanguozhi vol. 58.) even though Lu Ji (陸績) was one generation older than him.

== Early career ==
=== As a county-level official ===
In the early 200s, when Lu Xun was 20 years old, he came to serve the warlord Sun Quan, who was nominally a subject of the Han emperor, but had full autonomy in governing the territories in Jiangdong he inherited from his elder brother, Sun Ce. Lu Xun started his career as a minor officer in Sun Quan's office. He later became a Foreman Clerk in the East and West Bureaus (東西曹令史) and the Tuntian Commandant of Haichang (海昌屯田都尉; jurisdiction in present-day Haining, Zhejiang), before he was appointed as a county-level official. When the county was plagued by consecutive years of drought, Lu Xun opened up the granaries and distributed food supplies to the people, and promoted agriculture. The people benefited from his policies. At the time, there were many households in Wu, Kuaiji, and Danyang (丹楊) commanderies who were hiding from the government because they wanted to evade taxes and conscription. Lu Xun had them tracked down, registered and resettled. Some able-bodied young men were drafted for military service while others were recruited for agricultural labour. (Note: (孫權為將軍，遜年二十一，始仕幕府，歷東西曹令史，出為海昌屯田都尉，并領縣事。 ... 縣連年亢旱，遜開倉穀以振貧民，勸督農桑，百姓蒙賴。時吳、會稽、丹楊多有伏匿，遜陳便宜，乞與募焉。) Sanguozhi vol. 58.)

=== Eliminating bandit forces ===
Early in his career, Lu Xun joined Sun Quan's forces in eliminating bandits in the Jiangdong territories who had been terrorising the region for years and posed serious threats to Sun Quan's administration. He organised a militia to attack the bandits led by Pan Lin (潘臨) in Kuaiji Commandery, passing through treacherous territory and pacifying those who stood in his way. The number of troops under his command increased to over 2,000. When another bandit chief, You Tu (尤突), caused trouble in Poyang County, Lu Xun led an army to attack the bandits and achieved success. He was commissioned as Colonel Who Establishes Might (定威校尉) and ordered to garrison at Lipu County. (Note: (會稽山賊大帥潘臨，舊為所在毒害，歷年不禽。遜以手下召兵，討治深險，所向皆服，部曲已有二千餘人。鄱陽賊帥尤突作亂，復往討之，拜定威校尉，軍屯利浦。) Sanguozhi vol. 58.)

Lu Xun once advised Sun Quan to eliminate local bandit forces in Jiangdong first because they would hinder him in his aims to achieve supremacy over China. Sun Quan heeded Lu Xun's words and appointed him as a Commandant of the Right Section (右部督) under him. Fei Zhan (費棧), a bandit chief in Danyang Commandery, had received an official appointment from Cao Cao, a leading warlord who was also the de facto head of the Han government. Cao Cao had secretly instructed Fei Zhan to instigate the Shanyue tribes in Jiangdong to cause trouble for Sun Quan. In response, Sun Quan sent Lu Xun to attack Fei Zhan. Lu Xun had a much smaller army as compared to Fei Zhan, but he deceived the enemy into thinking that he had more troops. He prepared more flags and banners, spread out his war drums, ordered his men to sneak into the valleys at night and beat the drums loudly, so as to create an illusion of an overwhelming army. He emerged victorious over Fei Zhan. (Note: (... 數訪世務，遜建議曰：「方今英雄棊跱，豺狼闚望，克敵寧亂，非衆不濟。而山寇舊惡，依阻深地。夫腹心未平，難以圖遠，可大部伍，取其精銳。」權納其策，以為帳下右部督。 ... 會丹楊賊帥費棧受曹公印綬，扇動山越，為作內應，權遣遜討棧。棧支黨多而往兵少，遜乃益施牙幢，分布鼓角，夜潛山谷間，鼓譟而前，應時破散。) Sanguozhi vol. 58.)

Lu Xun sent his troops into the three commanderies in eastern Jiangdong, where he drafted many able-bodied young men for military service while the less physically fit ones were recruited for agricultural labour. He drafted tens of thousands of soldiers in total. He also cleared the region of opposing forces before returning to a garrison at Wuhu. (Note: (遂部伍東三郡，彊者為兵，羸者補戶，得精卒數萬人，宿惡盪除，所過肅清，還屯蕪湖。) Sanguozhi vol. 58.)

=== Conflict with Chunyu Shi ===
Chunyu Shi (淳于式), the Administrator of Kuaiji Commandery, once accused Lu Xun of oppressing and disturbing the common people. When Lu Xun travelled to Wu Commandery to meet Sun Quan and explain himself, he praised Chunyu Shi for being an excellent civil official. Sun Quan was puzzled so he asked Lu Xun, "Chunyu Shi made accusations against you, yet you praise him. Why?" Lu Xun replied, "Chunyu Shi was concerned about the people's welfare when he made accusations against me. If I rebuked him, I'll be violating my principles. This is something I won't do." Sun Quan said, "This is something a person with good morals will do and something which ordinary people aren't capable of doing." (Note: (會稽太守淳于式表遜枉取民人，愁擾所在。遜後詣都，言次，稱式佳吏，權曰：「式白君而君薦之，何也？」遜對曰：「式意欲養民，是以白遜。若遜復毀式以亂聖聽，不可長也。」權曰：「此誠長者之事，顧人不能為耳。」) Sanguozhi vol. 58.)

== Invasion of Jing Province ==
=== Planning for the invasion ===
Around 215, about six years after the Battle of Red Cliffs, Sun Quan had territorial disputes with his ally, Liu Bei, over southern Jing Province. Tensions between them nearly escalated to the point of armed conflict. However, after tense negotiations (Note: See Lu Su#Sun-Liu territorial dispute, Guan Yu#Sun-Liu territorial dispute and Gan Ning#Guan Yu's shallows for details.) between Lu Su (Sun Quan's representative) and Guan Yu (Liu Bei's representative), both sides eventually agreed to divide southern Jing Province between their respective domains along the Xiang River. (Note: (備遂割湘水為界，於是罷軍。) Sanguozhi vol. 54.) Guan Yu guarded Liu Bei's territories in southern Jing Province while Lü Meng was in charge of Sun Quan's. (Note: (魯肅卒，蒙西屯陸口，肅軍人馬萬餘盡以屬蒙。又拜漢昌太守，食下雋、劉陽、漢昌、州陵。與關羽分土接境，知羽驍雄，有并兼心，且居國上流，其勢難乆。) Sanguozhi vol. 54.)

In 219, Lü Meng came up with a plan to help Sun Quan seize control of Liu Bei's territories in Jing Province. He pretended to be sick and asked for permission to return to Jianye to seek medical treatment. Sun Quan played along by pretending to approve his request. Lu Xun went to visit Lü Meng and said, "Guan Yu is near the border. How can we remain far behind the border and not worry about having to guard against him?" Lü Meng replied, "What you've said is true, but I'm seriously ill now." Lu Xun then said, "Guan Yu is proud of his own valour and he scorns others. He may have made great achievements, but he's overly conceited. Besides, he's heading north and he has never seen us a threat. When he knows you're sick, he'll definitely lower his defences. If we attack him when he lowers his guard, we can capture him. I came here to discuss with you a plan to attack him." Lü Meng replied, "Guan Yu is known for his bravery and ferocity in battle, and he's a formidable foe. Besides, he's in control of Jing Province. He governs with virtue and has made great accomplishments, while the morale of his army is at its peak. It won't be easy to defeat him." (Note: (呂蒙稱疾詣建業，遜往見之，謂曰：「關羽接境，如何遠下，後不當可憂也？」蒙曰：「誠如來言，然我病篤。」遜曰：「羽矜其驍氣，陵轢於人。始有大功，意驕志逸，但務北進，未嫌於我，有相聞病，必益無備。今出其不意，自可禽制。下見至尊，宜好為計。」蒙曰：「羽素勇猛，旣難為敵，且已據荊州，恩信大行，兼始有功，膽勢益盛，未易圖也。」) Sanguozhi vol. 58.)

=== Succeeding Lü Meng ===
When Lü Meng arrived in Jianye, Sun Quan asked him, "Who can replace you?" Lü Meng responded, "Lu Xun is careful and thoughtful. He has the ability to shoulder this important responsibility. Based on my observations of him, I believe he's capable of taking up greater responsibilities in the future. Besides, he's relatively unknown, so Guan Yu won't be wary of him. This can't be better. If he's appointed, our enemies will be unaware of our intentions, while we can assess our strengths better and seek an opportunity to launch the attack." Sun Quan followed Lü Meng's suggestion and commissioned Lu Xun as a Lieutenant-General (偏將軍) and Inspector of the Right Section (右部督) to replace Lü Meng in Jing Province. (Note: (蒙至都，權問：「誰可代卿者？」蒙對曰：「陸遜意思深長，才堪負重，觀其規慮，終可大任。而未有遠名，非羽所忌，無復是過。若用之，當令外自韜隱，內察形便，然後可克。」權乃召遜，拜偏將軍右部督代蒙。) Sanguozhi vol. 58.)

When Lu Xun arrived at Lukou (陸口; at Lushui Lake near present-day Chibi, Hubei) to assume his new office, he wrote to Guan Yu to flatter him:

"Previously, I had the privilege of seeing you in action. You uphold good discipline in your army and achieved success with minimal effort. That is praiseworthy! Our enemy has been defeated. It is to our mutual benefit that we strengthen our alliance. Having received this piece of good news, I intend to pack up all my belongings and join you in striving to accomplish our lords' common goals. I am unintelligent, but I have received orders to travel to the west and take up this responsibility. I hope to catch a glimpse of your glory and receive some good advice from you." (Note: (遜至陸口，書與羽曰：「前承觀釁而動，以律行師，小舉大克，一何巍巍！敵國敗績，利在同盟，聞慶拊節，想遂席卷，共獎王綱。近以不敏，受任來西，延慕光塵，思稟良規。」) Sanguozhi vol. 58.)

Later, after Guan Yu defeated Yu Jin at the Battle of Fancheng, Lu Xun wrote a letter to Guan again to flatter him and put him off guard:

"Now that Yu Jin and others have been captured, everyone far and near rejoices, and your feat will be praised for generations. Neither Duke Wen of Jin's victory at Chengpu nor the Marquis of Huaiyin's strategy in conquering Zhao can be compared to your achievement. I heard that Xu Huang and his forces are approaching and preparing for an offensive. Cao Cao is very cunning and his intentions are difficult to predict. I am afraid he might secretly increase the number of troops (in Xu Huang's army) to achieve his aim. Even though the enemy is weary, they still have some fighting spirit left in them. Every time after scoring a victory, there is a tendency for us to underestimate the enemy. The best military leaders in ancient times maintained their defences even after they won battles. I hope that you can make grander plans to secure a total victory. I am but a scholar, negligent and slow, and unworthy in many aspects. I am pleased to have a majestic and virtuous neighbour like you; I cannot contain my excitement. Even though we have not worked together yet, I always hope for such an opportunity. If you require my attention, I will pay my fullest attention." (Note: (又曰：「于禁等見獲，遐邇欣歎，以為將軍之勳足以長世，雖昔晉文城濮之師，淮陰拔趙之略，蔑以尚茲。聞徐晃等步騎駐旌，闚望麾葆。操猾虜也，忿不思難，恐潛增衆，以逞其心。雖云師老，猶有驍悍。且戰捷之後，常苦輕敵，古人杖術，軍勝彌警，願將軍廣為方計，以全獨克。僕書生疏遲，忝所不堪，喜鄰威德，樂自傾盡，雖未合策，猶可懷也。儻明注仰，有以察之。」) Sanguozhi vol. 58.)

=== Invasion and pacification of Jing Province ===
Upon receiving the letters, Guan Yu saw that Lu Xun showed humility and expressed his desire to rely on him, so he felt at ease and lowered his guard. When Lu Xun heard about it, he wrote a report to Sun Quan and provided crucial details on how to defeat Guan Yu. Sun Quan secretly sent an army to invade Jing Province, with Lü Meng and Lu Xun leading the vanguard force. Lü Meng employed infiltration tactics to disable the watchtowers set up by Guan Yu along the Yangtze River, rendering them unable to warn Guan Yu about Sun Quan's advances, and then swiftly conquered Guan Yu's key bases in Jing Province – Gong'an County and Nan Commandery (南郡; around present-day Jiangling County, Hubei). For his contributions to the successful conquest of Jing Province, Lu Xun was appointed as the Administrator (太守) of Yidu Commandery (宜都郡; around present-day Yidu, Hubei), promoted to General Who Pacifies the Border (撫邊將軍), and enfeoffed as the Marquis of Hua Village (華亭侯). Fan You (樊友), the previous Administrator of Yidu Commandery under Guan Yu, abandoned his post and fled, while the officials and tribal chiefs in the commandery surrendered to Lu Xun. Lu Xun ordered official seals to be carved from gold, silver or bronze, and presented to these officials and tribal chiefs. This took place in around January 220. (Note: (羽覽遜書，有謙下自託之意，意大安，無復所嫌。遜具啟形狀，陳其可禽之要。權乃潛軍而上，使遜與呂蒙為前部，至即克公安、南郡。 ... 遜徑進，領宜都太守，拜撫邊將軍，封華亭侯。備宜都太守樊友委郡走，諸城長吏及蠻夷君長皆降。遜請金銀銅印，以假授初附。是歲建安二十四年十一月也。) Sanguozhi vol. 58.)

Even after Sun Quan's forces successfully conquered southern Jing Province, there were still some areas which were still controlled by Liu Bei's forces or other hostile forces, so Lu Xun had to pacify those regions. He sent his subordinates Li Yi (李異), Xie Jing (謝旌) and others to lead 3,000 troops to attack Liu Bei's officers Zhan Yan (詹晏) and Chen Feng (陳鳳). Li Yi led the naval forces while Xie Jing commanded the land army. They sealed the critical routes and defeated Zhan Yan and captured Chen Feng. They then attacked Deng Fu (鄧輔) and Guo Mu (郭睦), the Administrators of Fangling Commandery (房陵郡) and Nanxiang County (南鄉縣) respectively, and defeated the enemy. Wen Bu (文布) and Deng Kai (鄧凱), two influential men in Zigui County, rallied thousands of local tribesmen to form an army to attack Lu Xun in the west. In response, Lu Xun sent Xie Jing to attack them. Wen Bu and Deng Kai were defeated and they fled west to the state of Shu Han (founded by Liu Bei in 221). Lu Xun successfully induced Wen Bu into defecting to Sun Quan's side. (Note: (遜遣將軍李異、謝旌等將三千人，攻蜀將詹晏、陳鳳。異將水軍，旌將步兵，斷絕險要，即破晏等，生降得鳳。又攻房陵太守鄧輔、南鄉太守郭睦，大破之。秭歸大姓文布、鄧凱等合夷兵數千人，首尾西方。遜復部旌討破布、凱。布、凱脫走，蜀以為將。遜令人誘之，布帥衆還降。) Sanguozhi vol. 58.)

=== Aftermath ===
Throughout these campaigns in Jing Province, Lu Xun had killed, captured or recruited tens of thousands of enemies. In recognition of Lu Xun's efforts, Sun Quan promoted him to Right Protector-General (右護軍), General Who Guards the West (鎮西將軍), and promoted him from a village marquis to a county marquis under the title "Marquis of Lou" (婁侯). (Note: (前後斬獲招納，凡數萬計。權以遜為右護軍、鎮西將軍，進封婁侯。) Sanguozhi vol. 58.) Sun Quan was very pleased with Lu Xun and wanted to specially honour him. However, even though Lu Xun already held the rank of a general and a marquis title, he still had to go through the standard protocol of receiving a recommendation from the chief administrating officer in his home province. Hence, Sun Quan ordered Lü Fan, the Governor of Yang Province, to "backdate" Lu Xun's service record by stating that he had previously employed Lu Xun as an aide-de-camp (別駕從事) and recommended him as a maocai (茂才). (Note: In the Eastern Han dynasty, the standard protocol for an official's career progression was that he had to be first nominated as a xiaolian or maocai (茂才) before he could join the civil service or be eligible for higher appointments. Lu Xun skipped this stage in his early career, so his service record had to be backdated in order for his latest appointments and titles to be officially recognised.) (Note: (吳書曰：權嘉遜功德，欲殊顯之，雖為上將軍列侯，猶欲令歷本州舉命，乃使揚州牧呂範就辟別駕從事，舉茂才。) Wu Shu annotation in Sanguozhi vol. 58.)

At the time, there were many educated men in Jing Province who had either obtained positions in the civil service or were unemployed, so Lu Xun wrote a proposal to Sun Quan: (Note: (時荊州士人新還，仕進或未得所，遜上疏曰： ...) Sanguozhi vol. 58.)

"In the past, Emperor Gao recruited people with extraordinary abilities; talents flocked to join Emperor Guangwu when he revived the Han dynasty. We should attract all Confucian-educated men into the civil service, regardless of how far away they are. Now, Jing Province has just been pacified and there are still many people and things yet to be in place. I humbly urge you to employ these potential talents and groom them, so that all within the Empire will be attracted by our great culture." (Note: (... 「昔漢高受命，招延英異，光武中興，羣俊畢至，苟可以熙隆道教者，未必遠近。今荊州始定，人物未達，臣愚慺慺，乞普加覆載抽拔之恩，令並獲自進，然後四海延頸，思歸大化。」) Sanguozhi vol. 58.)

Sun Quan accepted Lu Xun's proposal. (Note: (權敬納其言。) Sanguozhi vol. 58.)

== Battle of Xiaoting ==
=== Historical background ===
In late 220, Cao Pi forced Emperor Xian to abdicate the throne in his favour and ended the Han dynasty. He declared himself emperor and established the state of Cao Wei to replace the Han dynasty, marking the start of the Three Kingdoms period. The following year, Liu Bei proclaimed himself emperor and established the state of Shu Han as a successor to the Han dynasty and to challenge Cao Pi's legitimacy. Sun Quan agreed to submit to Cao Pi's rule and received the title of a vassal king, King of Wu" (吳王). However, in late 222, he declared independence from the Cao Wei regime but retained his title "King of Wu".

=== Early stages ===
In early 222, Liu Bei personally led the Shu army to attack Sun Quan and retake his lost territories in southern Jing Province. Sun Quan appointed Lu Xun as Grand Chief Controller (大都督) and put him in command of 50,000 troops to resist the enemy, with Zhu Ran, Pan Zhang, Song Qian, Han Dang, Xu Sheng, Xianyu Dan (鮮于丹), Sun Huan and others serving as his subordinates. The Shu army passed through Wu Gorge (巫峽), Jianping (建平) and Lianping (連平) until they arrived on the outskirts of Yiling (夷陵; present-day Yichang, Hubei), where they laid siege and built several camps. Liu Bei bribed the local tribes in Yiling with gold and silk to support him. He appointed Feng Xi (馮習) as his Chief Controller, Zhang Nan (張南) as the vanguard, and Fu Kuang (輔匡), Zhao Rong (趙融), Liao Chun (廖淳) and Fu Rong as the controllers of the various divisions. He also sent Wu Ban to lead a few thousand men to construct camps on flat ground and provoke the Wu forces into attacking them. (Note: (黃武元年，劉備率大衆來向西界，權命遜為大都督、假節，督朱然、潘璋、宋謙、韓當、徐盛、鮮于丹、孫桓等五萬人拒之。 ... 備從巫峽、建平、連平、連圍至夷陵界，立數十屯，以金錦爵賞誘動諸夷，使將軍馮習為大督，張南為前部，輔匡、趙融、廖淳、傅肜等各為別督，先遣吳班將數千人於平地立營，欲以挑戰。) Sanguozhi vol. 58.)

When the Wu generals wanted to respond to the enemy's taunts, Lu Xun said, "This must be a trick. We should observe first." (Note: (諸將皆欲擊之，遜曰：「此必有譎，且觀之。」) Sanguozhi vol. 58.) Earlier on, when the Shu army first arrived at Yiling, the Wu generals wanted to attack the enemy, but Lu Xun objected and said, "Liu Bei is leading an army east to attack us and his army's morale is very high. Besides, his forces are based in high and mountainous terrain, so it's difficult for us to attack them. Even if we manage to win, we cannot completely defeat them. If we suffer any setback, our morale will be greatly affected and this isn't a small issue. Now, we should raise our troops' morale and make plans while waiting for changes in the situation. If we're on plains and flat ground, we should be worrying about sustaining heavy losses in skirmishes and charges. However, since the enemy is on mountainous terrain, they can't carry out an all-out assault because they're sandwiched between wood and rocks. We should take advantage of this weakness of theirs." The Wu generals did not understand Lu Xun's reasoning and thought that he feared the enemy so they were very disgruntled with him. (Note: (吳書曰：諸將並欲迎擊備，遜以為不可，曰：「備舉軍東下，銳氣始盛，且乘高守險，難可卒攻，攻之縱下，猶難盡克，若有不利，損我大勢，非小故也。今但且獎厲將士，廣施方略，以觀其變。若此間是平原曠野，當恐有顛沛交馳之憂，今緣山行軍，勢不得展，自當罷於木石之間，徐制其弊耳。」諸將不解，以為遜畏之，各懷憤恨。) Wu Shu annotation in Sanguozhi vol. 58.)

When Liu Bei realised that his plan to lure Wu forces into attacking him had failed, he led the 8,000 troops out of the valley, where they had been waiting in ambush earlier. When Lu Xun heard about it, he told his subordinates, "The reason why I didn't follow your suggestions to attack the enemy is because I suspected there was something fishy about it." (Note: (備知其計不可，乃引伏兵八千，從谷中出。遜曰：「所以不聽諸君擊班者，揣之必有巧故也。」) Sanguozhi vol. 58.) He then wrote a report to Sun Quan:

"Yiling is a strategic location on the border of our domain. It can be easily conquered but it is also easily lost (to the enemy). If we lose Yiling, we lose not only one commandery, but also put the entire Jing Province in peril. Today, we are fighting over it and we must win. Liu Bei defies Heaven's will, leaves his bases unguarded, and dares to thrust himself into our hands. I may not be very talented, but I have received grand support to attack the enemy, and their destruction is near. Liu Bei has more defeats than victories throughout his military career, so, based on this assessment, I believe he is not much of a threat. Initially, I thought he would advance from both land and water, but to my surprise, he abandoned his boats and chose the land route. He has been constructing camps everywhere and I do not think he will make any further changes to the current layout of his camps. I hope that you, my Lord, can be at ease and have no worries." (Note: (遜上疏曰：「夷陵要害，國之關限，雖為易得，亦復易失。失之非徒損一郡之地，荊州可憂。今日爭之，當令必諧。備干天常，不守窟穴，而敢自送。臣雖不材，憑奉威靈，以順討逆，破壞在近。尋備前後行軍，多敗少成，推此論之，不足為戚。臣初嫌之，水陸俱進，今反舍船就步，處處結營，察其布置，必無他變。伏願至尊高枕，不以為念也。」) Sanguozhi vol. 58.)

=== Burning of the Shu camps ===
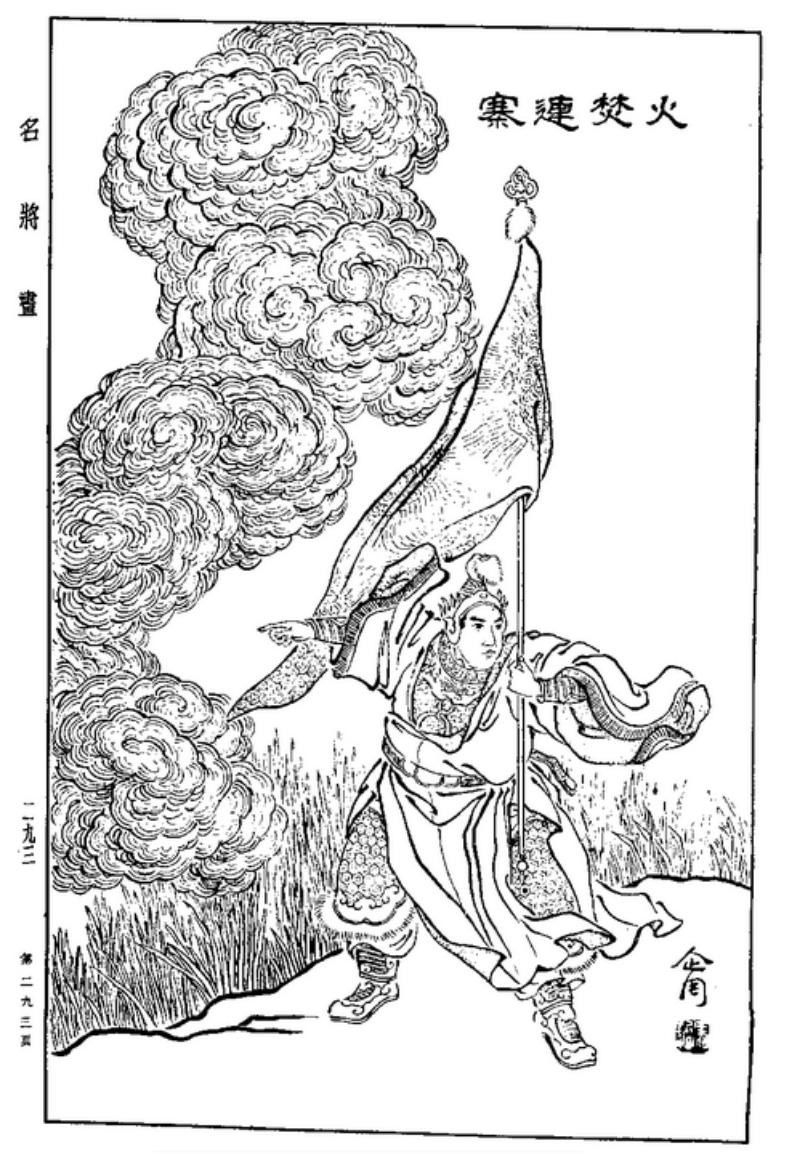
Lu Xun

The Wu generals said, "We should have attacked Liu Bei in the initial stages. Now, he has advanced further in by 500-600 li and we have been locked in a stalemate for seven to eight months. He has reinforced all his crucial positions, so even if we attack them it will yield nothing." Lu Xun replied, "Liu Bei is cunning and experienced. In the initial stage, his army was very focused and its morale was very high, so we couldn't defeat them then. Now, however, since it has been quite some time, they are already weary, low on morale, and out of ideas. Now is the time for us to launch a multi-pronged assault on them." (Note: (諸將並曰：「攻備當在初，今乃令入五六百里，相銜持經七八月，其諸要害皆以固守，擊之必無利矣。」遜曰：「備是猾虜，更甞事多，其軍始集，思慮精專，未可干也。今住已乆，不得我便，兵疲意沮，計不復生，犄角此寇，正在今日。」) Sanguozhi vol. 58.)

Lu Xun then targeted one enemy camp and attacked it but failed to capture it. The Wu officers complained, "We're sacrificing our soldiers' lives for nothing." Lu Xun replied, "I have devised a strategy for defeating the enemy." He then ordered his men to carry a pile of straw each and launch a fire attack on the enemy. Upon the commencement of the fire attack, Lu Xun led all the Wu units on an all-out assault on the Shu forces. The Shu generals Zhang Nan and Feng Xi, and the tribal king Shamoke (Liu Bei's ally) were killed in battle, while the Wu forces destroyed over 40 Shu camps. (Note: (乃先攻一營，不利。諸將皆曰：「空殺兵耳。」遜曰：「吾已曉破之之術。」乃勑各持一把茅，以火攻拔之。一爾勢成，通率諸軍同時俱攻，斬張南、馮習及胡王沙摩柯等首，破其四十餘營。) Sanguozhi vol. 58.)

The Shu officers Du Lu (杜路), Liu Ning (劉寧) and others surrendered when they saw they had no chance of escaping. Liu Bei and his remaining troops retreated to the Ma'an Hills (馬鞍山), where they continued to be fiercely assaulted by Wu forces from all directions. At the same time, landslides occurred at the Ma'an Hills and caused the Shu forces to suffer thousands of casualties. Liu Bei fled at night and ordered his men to pile up their armour and set them on fire to create barriers for the pursuing enemy. By the time Liu Bei reached the safety of Baidicheng, all his boats, military equipment and supplies had been captured by Wu forces. The dead bodies of Shu soldiers floated in the river and obstructed its flow. Liu Bei was extremely upset and furious with his defeat. He exclaimed, "Is it not the will of Heaven that I must be humiliated by Lu Xun?" (Note: (備將杜路、劉寧等窮逼請降。備升馬鞍山，陳兵自繞。遜督促諸軍四面蹙之，土崩瓦解，死者萬數。備因夜遁，驛人自擔，燒鐃鎧斷後，僅得入白帝城。其舟船器械，水步軍資，一時略盡，尸骸漂流，塞江而下。備大慙恚，曰：「吾乃為遜所折辱，豈非天邪！」) Sanguozhi vol. 58.)

=== Incidents during the battle ===
During the preliminary stages of the Battle of Xiaoting, Sun Huan had led a separate force to attack the Shu vanguard force at Yidao (夷道) but ended up being besieged by the enemy. He requested for reinforcements from Lu Xun but was denied. The other Wu officers said, "General Sun is a relative of our lord. He's under siege, so shouldn't we help him?" Lu Xun replied, "He has the support of his men, his base is well defended, and he has sufficient supplies. There's nothing to worry about. When my plans are set in motion, even if we don't go to his aid, the siege on him will automatically be lifted." After the Wu victory, Sun Huan came to see Lu Xun and said, "Earlier on, I was indeed very resentful when you refused to help me. But now, after the victory, I see you have your own way of doing things." (Note: (初，孫桓別討備前鋒於夷道，為備所圍，求救於遜。遜曰：「未可。」諸將曰：「孫安東公族，見圍已困，柰何不救？」遜曰：「安東得士衆心，城牢糧足，無可憂也。待吾計展，欲不救安東，安東自解。」及方略大施，備果奔潰。桓後見遜曰：「前實怨不見救，定至今日，乃知調度自有方耳。」) Sanguozhi vol. 58.)

Many of the Wu officers who participated in the battle had either served in Wu since Sun Ce's time or were relatives of the Sun family, so they viewed themselves highly and were unwilling to follow Lu Xun's orders. Lu Xun placed his sword on the desk and said, (Note: (當禦備時，諸將軍或是孫策時舊將，或公室貴戚，各自矜恃，不相聽從。遜案劒曰： ...) Sanguozhi vol. 58.)

"Liu Bei is well known throughout the Empire, and even Cao Cao feared him. Now, he's at our borders and we have a tough fight ahead. All of you gentlemen have received grace from the state, so you should cooperate harmoniously and work together to defeat the enemy to repay the state's kindness. You shouldn't be behaving as you are now. I may be a mere scholar, but I have received orders from our Lord. The reason why the state asks you to lower yourselves and submit to my command is because I have a modicum of value and I can endure humiliation for the sake of fulfilling a greater task. Each of you has your own duties so you can't excuse yourselves from them! Military rules are long established. You shouldn't break them." (Note: (... 「劉備天下知名，曹操所憚，今在境界，此彊對也。諸君並荷國恩，當相輯睦，共翦此虜，上報所受，而不相順，非所謂也。僕雖書生，受命主上。國家所以屈諸君使相承望者，以僕有尺寸可稱，能忍辱負重故也。各在其事，豈復得辭！軍令有常，不可犯矣。」) Sanguozhi vol. 58.)

The Wu officers began to show greater respect towards Lu Xun after the Wu victory, which was largely due to his strategies. (Note: (及至破備，計多出遜，諸將乃服。) Sanguozhi vol. 58.) When Sun Quan heard about this incident, he asked Lu Xun, "Why didn't you report to me about the generals refusing to follow your orders?" (Note: (權聞之，曰：「君何以初不啟諸將違節度者邪？」) Sanguozhi vol. 58.) Lu Xun replied,

"I've received much grace from the state and have been appointed to a position beyond my capability. All the generals are either trustworthy men, capable military leaders, or men who have rendered meritorious service, so they are important people whom the state can rely on in order to achieve its goals. I may be weak and cowardly, but I'd still like to learn from the virtues Xiangru (Note: Lin Xiangru was a minister in the Zhao state during the Warring States period. He once successfully settled a diplomatic crisis between Zhao and a rival state Qin. Lian Po, a senior Zhao general, was unhappy because Lin was appointed to a higher position in the Zhao court than him, so he attempted to find trouble with the latter but Lin avoided him. Lin later told others that the subjects of a state should maintain harmonious relations and cooperate for the benefits of the state. His speech reached Lian, who felt ashamed of his own behaviour and came to apologise to Lin. They became close friends and colleagues after that.) and Kou Xun (Note: Kou Xun (寇恂) was a general who contributed greatly to Emperor Guangwu's restoration of the Han dynasty in the 20s CE. He was later appointed as the Administrator of Yingchuan Commandery (穎川郡). Once, a soldier under another general, Jia Fu (賈復), killed an innocent civilian in Yingchuan and was executed by Kou. This incident brought great embarrassment to Jia, who swore to kill Kou if he met him, so Kou avoided him. Their conflict was eventually resolved with Emperor Guangwu's help.) when they put up with disagreements they had with their colleagues and worked together for the common good of their states." (Note: (遜對曰：「受恩深重，任過其才。又此諸將或任腹心，或堪爪牙，或是功臣，皆國家所當與共克定大事者。臣雖駑懦，竊慕相如、寇恂相下之義，以濟國事。」) Sanguozhi vol. 58.)

Sun Quan laughed and praised Lu Xun. Lu Xun was promoted to General Who Assists the State (輔國將軍), appointed as Governor (牧) of Jing Province, and had his marquis title changed to "Marquis of Jiangling" (江陵侯). (Note: (權大笑稱善，加拜遜輔國將軍，領荊州牧，即改封江陵侯。) Sanguozhi vol. 58.)

=== Aftermath ===
After Liu Bei had retreated to Baidicheng, Xu Sheng, Pan Zhang, Song Qian and other Wu generals suggested to attack Baidicheng and capture Liu Bei. When Sun Quan asked Lu Xun for his opinion, Lu, along with Zhu Ran and Luo Tong, said that when Cao Pi amassed his forces and seemed like he was going to help Wu attack Shu, he was actually harbouring sinister intentions, so they should be cautious, abandon their pursuit of Liu Bei, and return to Wu. Not long later, Cao Pi led the Wei armies to invade Wu from three directions. (Note: (又備旣住白帝，徐盛、潘璋、宋謙等各競表言備必可禽，乞復攻之。權以問遜，遜與朱然、駱統以為曹丕大合士衆，外託助國討備，內實有姦心，謹決計輒還。無幾，魏軍果出，三方受敵也。) Sanguozhi vol. 58.)

When Liu Bei heard of the Wei invasion of Wu, he wrote to Lu: "The enemy (Wei) is at Jiangling now. If I launch another attack again, in your opinion, do you think I will succeed?" (Note: (吳錄曰：劉備聞魏軍大出，書與遜云：「賊今已在江陵，吾將復東，將軍謂其能然不？」) Wu Lu annotation in Sanguozhi vol. 58.) Lu Xun replied:

"I am afraid your army has recently suffered defeats and has yet to recover. Now is the time for you to make reconciliations, rest and recuperate. This is not the time for you to launch another attack again. However, if you do not consider carefully and plan to dispatch all your remaining forces on another attack, you will lose even more of your forces." (Note: (遜荅曰：「但恐軍新破，創痍未復，始求通親，且當自補，未暇窮兵耳。若不惟筭，欲復以傾覆之餘，遠送以來者，無所逃命。」) Wu Lu annotation in Sanguozhi vol. 58.)

Liu Bei died in 223 and was succeeded by his son, Liu Shan, as the emperor of Shu. Zhuge Liang became Shu's head of government and he made peace with Wu and reestablished the Wu–Shu alliance against Wei. Sun Quan granted permission to Lu Xun to reply to Zhuge Liang on his behalf, and had a duplicate of his own official seal made and sent to Lu's office. Whenever Sun Quan wrote to Liu Shan and Zhuge Liang, he would allow Lu Xun to read the letters, make the appropriate modifications, stamp his official seal on them and have them delivered to Shu. (Note: (備尋病亡，子禪襲位，諸葛亮秉政，與權連和。時事所宜，權輒令遜語亮，并刻權印，以置遜所。權每與禪、亮書，常過示遜，輕重可否，有所不安，便令改定，以印封行之。) Sanguozhi vol. 58.)

== Battle of Shiting ==
In 228, Sun Quan instructed Zhou Fang, the Administrator (太守) of Poyang Commandery (鄱陽郡), to pretend to defect to Cao Xiu, the Grand Marshal (大司馬) of Wei, and lure Wei forces to attack Wu. Cao Xiu fell for the ruse and led his armies to attack the Wu garrison at Wan County (皖縣; present-day Qianshan County, Anhui). Sun Quan granted Lu Xun a yellow ceremonial axe, appointed him as Grand Chief Controller (大都督) again, and put him in command of six Wu armies and the imperial guards to resist the Wei invaders. (Note: (七年，權使鄱陽太守周魴譎魏大司馬曹休，休果舉衆入皖，乃召遜假黃鉞，為大都督，逆休。) Sanguozhi vol. 58.) Lu Xun thus had the authority to act on Sun Quan's behalf. Sun Quan even waved a ceremonial whip and ordered all his subjects to pay their respects to Lu Xun. (Note: (陸機為遜銘曰：魏大司馬曹休侵我北鄙，乃假公黃鉞，統御六師及中軍禁衞而攝行王事，主上執鞭，百司屈膝。) Lu Xun Ming annotation in Sanguozhi vol. 58.) (Note: (吳錄曰：假遜黃鉞，吳王親執鞭以見之。) Wu Lu annotation in Sanguozhi vol. 58.)

When Cao Xiu realised he had been deceived by Zhou Fang, he felt humiliated but decided to continue the campaign anyway because he had superiority in numbers and his troops were well-trained. During the Battle of Shiting, Lu Xun remained in the central command, with Zhu Huan and Quan Cong leading the armies on his left and right flanks respectively. Their three armies advanced together and defeated Cao Xiu's forces lying in ambush and drove them further northward until Jiashi (夾石). They killed and captured thousands of enemies and obtained much of the enemy's livestock, equipment and supplies. Cao Xiu died of illness after returning to Wei. Lu Xun and the victorious Wu forces returned to Wuchang (武昌; present-day Ezhou, Hubei), where Sun Quan held a grand reception for them. Sun Quan instructed his servants to shield Lu Xun with his imperial parasol when he entered or left the palace, and rewarded Lu Xun with many gifts. The honours Lu Xun received were unprecedented in his time. He moved to Xiling County (西陵縣; present-day Xiling District, Yichang, Hubei) after that. (Note: (休旣覺知，恥見欺誘，自恃兵馬精多，遂交戰。遜自為中部，令朱桓、全琮為左右翼，三道俱進，果衝休伏兵，因驅走之，追亡逐北，徑至夾石，斬獲萬餘，牛馬騾驢車乘萬兩，軍資器械略盡。休還，疽發背死。 ... 諸軍振旅過武昌，權令左右以御蓋覆遜，入出殿門，凡所賜遜，皆御物上珍，於時莫與為比。遣還西陵。) Sanguozhi vol. 58.)

== Mid career ==
In 229, after Sun Quan declared himself emperor and established the state of Eastern Wu in Wuchang (武昌; present-day Ezhou, Hubei), he appointed Lu Xun as Senior General-in-Chief (上大將軍) and Right Protector-General (右都護). That year, Sun Quan embarked on an inspection tour of Jianye in the east, leaving behind his crown prince Sun Deng, his other sons, and some high-ranking officials in charge of Wuchang. Lu Xun was instructed to assist Sun Deng and oversee all civil and military affairs in Jing Province and three other commanderies. (Note: (黃龍元年，拜上大將軍、右都護。是歲，權東巡建業，留太子、皇子及尚書九官，徵遜輔太子，并掌荊州及豫章三郡事，董督軍國。) Sanguozhi vol. 58.)

=== Treatment of Sun Lü and Sun Song, and criticism of Liu Yi ===
At the time, Sun Quan's second son Sun Lü, the Marquis of Jianchang, enjoyed watching duck fights so he had a small shed built in front of the main hall of his residence to stage duck fights. When Lu Xun heard about it, he reprimanded Sun Lü sternly, "Marquis, you should be spending time reading the classics and enriching yourself with knowledge. Why are you doing this?" Sun Lü immediately had the shed torn down. Sun Song (孫松; Sun Yi's son), the Colonel of Trainee Archers (射聲校尉), who was one of Sun Quan's favourite relatives, allowed his men to fool around in camp and did not maintain good military discipline. Lu Xun punished Sun Song's subordinates by having their heads shaved. (Note: (時建昌侯慮於堂前作鬬鴨欄，頗施小巧，遜正色曰：「君侯宜勤覽經典以自新益，用此何為？」慮即時毀徹之。 ... 射聲校尉松於公子中最親，戲兵不整，遜對之髠其職吏。) Sanguozhi vol. 58.)

Xie Jing (謝景) admired Liu Yi's discourse on punishment before civility. Lu Xun chided Xie Jing, "The idea of civility before punishment has been long promulgated and espoused. Liu Yi is wrong when he distorted the teachings of ancient sages through his sly manipulation of words. You're serving in the Crown Prince's residence, so you should advocate the principles of benevolence and righteousness in order to promote moral virtues. Ideas (like Liu Yi's) should never be discussed again." (Note: (南陽謝景善劉廙先刑後禮之論，遜呵景曰：「禮之長於刑乆矣，廙以細辯而詭先聖之教，皆非也。君今侍東宮，宜遵仁義以彰德音，若彼之談，不須講也。」) Sanguozhi vol. 58.)

=== Memorial on current affairs ===
Even though Lu Xun was stationed far away from the Wu capital, he was still very concerned about his state. He once wrote a memorial on current affairs to Sun Quan: (Note: (遜雖身在外，乃心於國，上疏陳時事曰： ...) Sanguozhi vol. 58.)

"I believe that if the laws are too strict and harsh, there will be more offenders. In recent years, many military and civil officers have committed transgressions and they ought to be punished for their negligence. However, the Empire has yet to be unified, so we should focus more on achieving progress and pardon those who commit minor offences, so that Your Majesty can empathise with and build emotional ties with your subjects. Besides, there are more affairs to attend to as days pass by, so our top priority should be to tap into the abilities of talented people. If they did not commit any malicious crimes or unforgivable offences, they should be pardoned and provided with opportunities to display their skills again. This is what a wise ruler should do – forget his subjects' misdoings but remember their contributions, so they will do their best to help him achieve his aims. In the past, Emperor Gao ignored Chen Ping's flaws and employed his strategies, resulting in the accomplishment of a great task (the founding of the Han dynasty) which left a mark in history. Strict and harsh laws do not make an Empire more prosperous; justice not tempered with mercy does not serve as a cornerstone of the grand empire we envision." (Note: (遜雖身在外，乃心於國，上疏陳時事曰：「臣以為科法嚴峻，下犯者多。頃年以來，將吏罹罪，雖不慎可責，然天下未一，當圖進取，小宜恩貸，以安下情。且世務日興，良能為先，自不姦穢入身，難忍之過，乞復顯用，展其力效。此乃聖王忘過記功，以成王業。昔漢高舍陳平之愆，用其奇略，終建勳祚，功垂千載。夫峻法嚴刑，非帝王之隆業；有罰無恕，非懷遠之弘規也。」) Sanguozhi vol. 58.)

=== Advising Sun Quan against the Yizhou and Zhuya campaigns ===
When Sun Quan was planning to send armies to conquer Yizhou (夷州; present-day Taiwan) and Zhuya (朱崖; present-day Hainan), he asked Lu Xun for his opinion. Lu Xun wrote a memorial to Sun Quan, advising him against the campaigns: (Note: (權欲遣偏師取夷州及朱崖，皆以諮遜，遜上疏曰： ...) Sanguozhi vol. 58.)

"In my humble opinion, I believe that the Empire has yet to be pacified, so we should conserve manpower for future plans. We have been fighting battles for consecutive years and our forces are already weary. Your Majesty is already occupied with state affairs and has been sacrificing sleep and meal times, and now you are planning to conquer Yizhou? After serious consideration, I believe that there are no visible gains from this campaign. Besides, our troops will be travelling over long distances for the campaigns and the conditions ahead are unclear. They may not be well adjusted to changes in the climate and will fall sick. If Your Majesty proceeds with the campaign, our troops will be venturing into uncharted lands and we are likely to make more losses than gains. Zhuya is a dangerous place, its people are barbaric, so even if we force them to submit, they will be of no use to us and we cannot replenish our losses by recruiting soldiers from among them. As of now, Jiangdong has sufficient manpower and resources to sustain itself, so we should conserve our strengths and wait for opportunities to strike later. When Prince Huan (Sun Ce's posthumous title) built the foundation of our state, he did not have enough soldiers to form even one brigade, but yet he managed to accomplish this great task. Your Majesty established our state with blessings from Heaven. I heard that in order to pacify chaos and defeat enemies, military force is essential. The basic needs of the people are agriculture, food and clothing, but armed conflicts have yet to subside and the people are suffering from hunger and cold. In my humble opinion, I believe that we should nurture and educate the people, reduce taxes, maintain peace, and promote moral values and courage. In this way, the areas around the rivers can be pacified and we can unite the Nine Provinces." (Note: (... 「臣愚以為四海未定，當須民力，以濟時務。今兵興歷年，見衆損減，陛下憂勞聖慮，忘寢與食，將遠規夷州，以定大事，臣反覆思惟，未見其利，萬里襲取，風波難測，民易水土，必致疾疫，今驅見衆，經涉不毛，欲益更損，欲利反害。又珠崖絕險，民猶禽獸，得其民不足濟事，無其兵不足虧衆。今江東見衆，自足圖事，但當畜力而後動耳。昔桓王創基，兵不一旅，而開大業。陛下承運，拓定江表。臣聞治亂討逆，須兵為威，農桑衣食，民之本業，而干戈未戢，民有饑寒。臣愚以為宜育養士民，寬其租賦，衆克在和，義以勸勇，則河渭可平，九有一統矣。」權遂征夷州，得不補失。) Sanguozhi vol. 58.)

Sun Quan ignored Lu Xun's advice and launched the campaigns. Lu Xun's predictions were right as the losses incurred by Wu in the conquests outweighed the gains. (Note: (權遂征夷州，得不補失。) Sanguozhi vol. 58.)

=== Advising Sun Quan against the Liaodong campaign ===
In 237, the Liaodong warlord Gongsun Yuan rebelled against Wu's rival state Wei and allied with Wu, but broke the alliance later. Sun Quan was angered and he wanted to personally lead an army to attack Liaodong. Lu Xun wrote another memorial to dissuade Sun Quan from the campaign: (Note: (及公孫淵背盟，權欲往征，遜上疏曰： ...) Sanguozhi vol. 58.)

"Gongsun Yuan thinks that he is safe behind Liaodong's natural barriers, so he dares to detain our ambassador and refuse to send us fine steeds. His actions are indeed antagonistic. These barbarians are cunning and uncivilised, they are like animals in the wild, and they still dare to defy our imperial might. Your Majesty is furious and intends to sail a long distance across the sea to attack them without considering the perils which lie ahead. Currently, the Empire is in a state of chaos, contending warlords fight each other, heroes glare and yell at each other. Your Majesty possesses divine martial might and has received Heaven's grace when you defeated Cao Cao at Wulin (烏林), thwarted Liu Bei's forces at Xiling (西陵), and captured Guan Yu in Jing Province. All three of them were heroes of their time but they still lost to you. Your Majesty's might has pacified many people, lands within thousands of li submit to you, but we still need a great plan to conquer the whole of China. Your Majesty does not tolerate this minor infringement on your authority, displays overwhelming rage, defies wise sayings by people in the past, and intends to thrust yourself into danger? This is something I cannot understand. I heard that those who want to travel thousands of li will not stop midway; one who intends to conquer the Empire will not be affected by a small setback. Powerful enemies are at our borders while barbarians have yet to submit to our rule. If Your Majesty departs on a long expedition, our enemies will take advantage of your absence to attack us, and it will be too late to regret by then. If we succeed in unifying the Empire, Gongsun Yuan will surrender to us without having to be coerced. Your Majesty may desire the military forces and fine steeds of Liaodong, but are you willing to forsake this stable foundation in Jiangdong in order to acquire those? I humbly urge you to allow our armies to relax and strike fear in our great enemies, so that we can conquer the Central Plains soon and achieve eternal glory." (Note: (... 「淵憑險恃固，拘留大使，名馬不獻，實可讎忿。蠻夷猾夏，未染王化，鳥竄荒裔，拒逆王師，至令陛下爰赫斯怒，欲勞萬乘汎輕越海，不慮其危而涉不測。方今天下雲擾，羣雄虎爭，英豪踊躍，張聲大視。陛下以神武之姿，誕膺期運，破操烏林，敗備西陵，禽羽荊州，斯三虜者當世雄傑，皆摧其鋒。聖化所綏，萬里草偃，方蕩平華夏，總一大猷。今不忍小忿，而發雷霆之怒，違垂堂之戒，輕萬乘之重，此臣之所惑也。臣聞志行萬里者，不中道而輟足；圖四海者，匪懷細以害大。彊寇在境，荒服未庭，陛下乘桴遠征，必致闚[]，慼至而憂，悔之無及。若使大事時捷，則淵不討自服；今乃遠惜遼東衆之與馬，柰何獨欲捐江東萬安之本業而不惜乎？乞息六師，以威大虜，早定中夏，垂曜將來。」) Sanguozhi vol. 58.)

Sun Quan heeded his advice. (Note: (權用納焉。) Sanguozhi vol. 58.)

== Xiangyang campaign ==
In 234, (Note: The Sanguozhi erroneously recorded the year as 236 (5th year of the Jiahe era in Sun Quan's reign). The Zizhi Tongjian recorded the year as 234 (2nd year of the Qinglong era in Cao Rui's reign).) when Sun Quan led a 100,000 strong army to attack the Wei fortress of Xincheng at Hefei, he ordered Lu Xun and Zhuge Jin to lead another 10,000 troops to attack the Wei city of Xiangyang. Lu Xun sent a close aide, Han Bian (韓扁), to deliver a report to Sun Quan. On the journey back, Han Bian was captured by a Wei patrol. When Zhuge Jin received news of Han Bian's capture, he became fearful so he wrote to Lu Xun: "His Majesty has withdrawn his forces. The enemy has captured Han Bian and they know our situation. The rivers have dried up so we should make a hasty retreat." Lu Xun did not respond, and he instructed his men to plant turnips and peas, while he played weiqi and other games with his officers as though nothing had happened. Zhuge Jin said, "Boyan possesses intelligence and strategy, he knows what he's doing." He came to see Lu Xun, who told him, "The enemy knows that His Majesty has withdrawn his forces, so they have no worries and will concentrate their attacks on us. Besides, they have already stationed troops at critical positions and are poised to strike. Hence, we should remain composed and calm our men, after which we will have a change of plans and prepare to withdraw. If we display signs of retreat now, the enemy will think that we are afraid and will definitely attack us, resulting in defeat for us." (Note: (嘉禾五年，權北征，使遜與諸葛瑾攻襄陽。遜遣親人韓扁齎表奉報，還，遇敵於沔中，鈔邏得扁。瑾聞之甚懼，書與遜云：「大駕已旋，賊得韓扁，具知吾闊狹。且水乾，宜當急去。」遜未荅，方催人種葑豆，與諸將弈棊射戲如常。瑾曰：「伯言多智略，其當有以。」自來見遜，遜曰：「賊知大駕以旋，無所復慼，得專力於吾。又已守要害之處，兵將意動，且當自定以安之，施設變術，然後出耳。今便示退，賊當謂吾怖，仍來相蹙，必敗之勢也。」) Sanguozhi vol. 58.)

Lu Xun then secretly conveyed his plan to Zhuge Jin and ordered him to supervise the fleet of vessels on which they would sail back to Wu, while he gathered his troops and headed towards Xiangyang. The Wei forces had been wary of Lu Xun all this while so they immediately retreated back into the city when they saw Lu Xun's army approaching. Lu Xun organised his men in an orderly manner and instructed them to pretend to prepare for an attack on Xiangyang. By then, Zhuge Jin and the fleet had shown up, so Lu Xun and his forces progressively retreated to the vessels and left. The Wei forces in Xiangyang did not dare to make any move. (Note: (乃密與瑾立計，令瑾督舟船，遜悉上兵馬，以向襄陽城。敵素憚遜，遽還赴城。瑾便引船出，遜徐整部伍，張拓聲勢，步趨船，敵不敢干。) Sanguozhi vol. 58.)

=== Raid in Shiyang ===
On their journey back to Wu, the fleet passed by Baiwei (白圍), where Lu Xun announced that they would be getting off their vessels to go ashore for a hunting expedition. However, he actually gave secret orders to his subordinates Zhou Jun (周峻) and Zhang Liang (張梁) to lead their men to attack Xinshi (新市), Anlu (安陸) and Shiyang (石陽) counties in Jiangxia Commandery (江夏郡). Outside Shiyang County, the common people were going about their daily activities in the marketplace when Zhou Jun and his men showed up. The people immediately packed up everything and attempted to rush to safety behind the city walls. The Wei soldiers in Shiyang wanted to close the city gates but the civilians were blocking the way, so they killed some people and forced the gates to be shut. Zhou Jun and his men killed and captured over 1,000 civilians in Shiyang. The captives were resettled in Wu. Lu Xun gave orders to his men, forbidding them from harassing the people. Those captives who had their families with them were given due attention and care while those who lost their loved ones during the raid were provided with food and clothing and treated well before they were sent home. Many people were so touched by Lu Xun's acts of kindness that they decided to move to Wu territory. When news of Lu Xun's kindness spread to the neighbouring regions, two Wei officers, Zhao Zhuo (趙濯) and Fei Sheng (斐生), and a tribal king, Meiyi (梅頤), led their followers to join Lu Xun. Lu Xun generously distributed rewards to them. (Note: (軍到白圍，託言住獵，潛遣將軍周峻、張梁等擊江夏新市、安陸、石陽，石陽市盛，峻等奄至，人皆捐物入城。城門噎不得關，敵乃自斫殺己民，然後得闔。斬首獲生，凡千餘人。 ... 其所生得，皆加營護，不令兵士干擾侵侮。將家屬來者，使就料視。若亡其妻子者，即給衣糧，厚加慰勞，發遣令還，或有感慕相攜而歸者。鄰境懷之，江夏功曹趙濯、弋陽備將斐生及夷王梅頤等，並帥支黨來附遜。遜傾財帛，周贍經恤。) Sanguozhi vol. 58.)

=== Criticism ===
The historian Pei Songzhi, who annotated Lu Xun's biography in the Records of the Three Kingdoms, condemned the raid on Shiyang County and said it was totally uncalled for. He commented:

"When Lu Xun heard that Sun Quan had retreated and knew that the Wei forces were going to concentrate their attacks on him, he pretended to adopt an offensive approach, which successfully deterred the enemy from advancing. After that, he retreated safely and could sail back to Wu without having any worries. Why must he order his subordinates to raid a small county, cause the people in a busy marketplace to scurry in fear and panic, and inflict so much harm on a civilian population? The loss of 1,000 civilians may have had a negligible effect on Wei, but the slaughter of innocent people only demonstrated sheer brutality and cruelty. This was a stark contrast to what Zhuge Liang and the Shu forces did during the battles around the Wei River. The rules of war had been violated, and such crimes will not go unpunished. Eastern Wu did not last beyond three generations and ended up being conquered in Sun Hao's time. Is this not retribution?" (Note: (臣松之以為遜慮孫權已退，魏得專力於己，旣能張拓形勢，使敵不敢犯，方舟順流，無復怵惕矣，何為復潛遣諸將，奄襲小縣，致令市人駭奔，自相傷害？俘馘千人，未足損魏，徒使無辜之民橫罹荼酷，與諸葛渭濵之師，何其殊哉！用兵之道旣違，失律之凶宜應，其祚無三世，及孫而滅，豈此之餘殃哉！) Pei Songzhi's annotation in Sanguozhi vol. 58.)

In response to Lu Xun's "acts of kindness" after the raid, Pei Songzhi remarked:

"This is akin to saving one fledgling after destroying all the bird nests in a forest. How can such simple acts of kindness ever compensate for the losses in a brutal massacre?" (Note: (臣松之以為此無異殘林覆巢而全其遺[]，曲惠小仁，何補大虐？) Pei Songzhi's annotation in Sanguozhi vol. 58.)

== Later career ==
=== Eliminating Lu Shi ===
Lu Shi (逯式), the Administrator (太守) of the Wei-controlled Jiangxia Commandery (江夏郡), often led his men to cause trouble at the border between Wu and Wei. When Lu Xun heard that Lu Shi could not get along with Wen Xiu (文休), a son of the veteran Wei general Wen Ping, he came up with a plan to stop Lu Shi. He pretended to have received a letter from Lu Shi and wrote a "reply" as such: "I can sense your sincerity and sorrow when you told me you have disagreements with Wen Xiu. You said both of you cannot exist together and you intend to defect to my side. I have delivered your letter to my lord and will gather my men to welcome you. You should make preparations soon and inform us of the date of your defection." He then left the "reply" letter at the border, where it was picked up by Lu Shi's men. When Lu Shi heard about it, he became afraid and immediately sent his family to the Wei capital Luoyang. His subordinates became distrustful of him and eventually he was dismissed from office. (Note: (又魏江夏太守逯式兼領兵馬，頗作邊害，而與北舊將文聘子休宿不協。遜聞其然，即假作荅式書云：「得報懇惻，知與休乆結嫌隙，勢不兩存，欲來歸附，輒以密呈來書表聞，撰衆相迎。宜潛速嚴，更示定期。」以書置界上，式兵得書以見式，式惶懼，遂自送妻子還洛。由是吏士不復親附，遂以免罷。) Sanguozhi vol. 58.)

==== Criticism ====
Commenting on this incident, the historian Pei Songzhi wrote:

"It is normal for military commanders stationed at borders to create problems in the area for their enemies on the other side. Even though Lu Xun had successfully framed and eliminated Lu Shi, the person who replaces Lu Shi will still continue to cause trouble at the border. Lu Shi's actions were not done with malicious intent, nor would they pose a serious threat to Wu. Lu Xun should not even bother about this, much less resort to using such a cunning trick. I disagree (with Chen Shou) when he wrote about this incident as if it was praiseworthy." (Note: (臣松以為邊將為害，蓋其常事，使逯式得罪，代者亦復如之，自非狡焉思肆，將成大患，何足虧損唯慮，尚為小詐哉？以斯為美，又所不取。) Pei Songzhi's annotation in Sanguozhi vol. 58.)

=== Suppressing rebellions in Wu ===
In 237, Zhou Zhi (周祗), a General of the Household (中郎將), wanted to recruit soldiers from Poyang Commandery (鄱陽郡) so he sought Lu Xun's opinion. Lu Xun believed that the people in Poyang were very restless and should not be recruited for military service because they might rebel. (Note: Sun Quan's biography in Sanguozhi recorded that Poyang had a rebellion which began in the 10th month of the 5th year of the Jiahe era of Sun Quan's reign, led by one Peng Dan. The biography also recorded that Lu Xun began the expedition against the rebels in the 2nd month of the following year and quelled the rebellion within the year. (Note: ([嘉禾五年]冬十月，....鄱阳贼彭旦等为乱。....[嘉禾六年]二月，陆逊讨彭旦等，其年，皆破之。) Sanguozhi, vol.47.) It is unknown if Peng Dan's rebellion was the same as Wu Ju's.) Zhou Zhi ignored Lu Xun's advice and persisted. As Lu Xun predicted, the people in Poyang started a rebellion under the leadership of Wu Ju (吳遽) and they killed Zhou Zhi and seized control of many counties. The people in the nearby Yuzhang (豫章) and Luling (廬陵) commanderies had a history of being rebellious, so they responded to Wu Ju's call and joined the revolt. Lu Xun led his forces to suppress the rebellion and succeeded in forcing Wu Ju and the rebels to surrender. He recruited over 8,000 men into his army and pacified the three commanderies. (Note: (六年，中郎將周祗乞於鄱陽召募，事下問遜。遜以為此郡民易動難安，不可與召，恐致賊寇。而祗固陳取之，郡民吳遽等果作賊殺祗，攻沒諸縣。豫章、廬陵宿惡民，並應遽為寇。遜自聞，輒討即破，遽等相率降，遜料得精兵八千餘人，三郡平。) Sanguozhi vol. 58.)

=== Incident of Lü Yi ===
At the time, Lü Yi, the supervisor of the audit bureau, was abusing his powers. Lu Xun and the Minister of Ceremonies (太常), Pan Jun, expressed their worries about Lü Yi's behaviour to Sun Quan, to the point of shedding tears. After Lü Yi's crimes were exposed later, Sun Quan had him executed and deeply regretted not listening to Lu Xun and Pan Jun. (Note: (時中書典校呂壹，竊弄權柄，擅作威福，遜與太常潘濬同心憂之，言至流涕。後權誅壹，深以自責，語在權傳。) Sanguozhi vol. 58.)

=== Advice to Sun Quan on governance ===
Xie Yuan (謝淵) and Xie Gong (謝厷), proposed implementing changes to policies to increase government revenue, so Sun Quan sought Lu Xun's opinion on this issue. Lu Xun argued, (Note: (時謝淵、謝厷等各陳便宜，欲興利改作，以事下遜。遜議曰： ...) Sanguozhi vol. 58.)

"The people form the foundation of a state. A state's prosperity is due to its people's efforts and its revenue comes from the people as well. There has never been a case where the people are wealthy but the state is weak, nor a situation where the people are weak but the state is powerful. Those who run a state need the support of their people in order to have a good administration, and if they lose the people's support there will be chaos. It is difficult to make people strive their best if they cannot even see the potential benefits of their labour. This is exactly as described in this line from the Classic of Poetry: 'One who helps the commoners and the people shall receive grace from Heaven.' I urge Your Majesty to show benevolence towards the people and help them. We should implement these changes only after the imperial treasury's revenue inflow has increased. This will happen some years later." (Note: (... 「國以民為本，彊由民力，財由民出。夫民殷國弱，民瘠國彊者，未之有也。故為國者，得民則治，失之則亂，若不受利，而令盡用立效，亦為難也。是以詩歎『宜民宜人，受祿于天』。乞垂聖恩，寧濟百姓，數年之間，國用小豐，然後更圖。」) Sanguozhi vol. 58.)

== Chancellorship ==
Sometime between 27 January and 25 February 244, Lu Xun succeeded Gu Yong as the Imperial Chancellor (丞相) of Wu. Sun Quan's imperial edict read: (Note: (赤烏七年，代顧雍為丞相，詔曰： ...) Sanguozhi vol. 58.)

"I may be lacking in virtue, but by Heaven's grace I managed to ascend the throne. The Empire has yet to be unified, evil villains line the paths. I am filled with anxiety and I cannot rest well at night. You are endowed with great intelligence and wisdom, and your brilliance and moral virtues are clearly apparent. You have taken up military appointments and have defended the state well in times of peril. Those who have achieved unprecedented glory shall receive befitting honours and favours; those who possess talents in civil and military arts will certainly have to shoulder the responsibilities of administering a state. In the past, Yi Yin and Lü Shang assisted King Tang of Shang and King Wu of Zhou respectively. You are in charge of both internal and external affairs. Today, I appoint you as Imperial Chancellor and authorise Fu Chang (傅常), acting Minister of Ceremonies and Bearer of the Imperial Sceptre (使持節守太常), to bestow upon you the official seal of the Imperial Chancellor. You are expected to promote moral virtues, make achievements worthy of esteem, respect and follow imperial orders, and pacify the Empire. You are now overall in charge of the Three Excellencies's affairs, so you should maintain discipline among the officials and command respect from them! You will still continue to hold the following offices concurrently: Governor of Jing Province; Right Defender of the Capital; chief overseer of affairs in Wuchang (武昌; present-day Ezhou, Hubei)." (Note: (「朕以不德，應期踐運，王塗未一，姦宄充路，夙夜戰懼，不惶鑒寐。惟君天資聦叡，明德顯融，統任上將，匡國弭難。夫有超世之功者，必應光大之寵；懷文武之才者，必荷社稷之重。昔伊尹隆湯，呂尚翼周，內外之任，君實兼之。今以君為丞相，使使持節守太常傅常授印綬。君其茂昭明德，脩乃懿績，敬服王命，綏靖四方。於乎！總司三事，以訓羣寮，可不敬與，君其勗之！其州牧都護領武昌事如故。」) Sanguozhi vol. 58.)

== Role in the succession struggle ==
There were vacancies in the appointments available in the estates (or offices) of two of Sun Quan's sons: Sun He, the Crown Prince and Sun Ba, the Prince of Lu. Many officials nominated their relatives to fill up these positions in the hope of building connections with the princes. When Quan Cong told Lu Xun about this, Lu Xun said that many of the nominated candidates were actually not up to standard. He argued that those officials were actually promoting nepotism and pursuing their own interests. He also worried that if those officials' relatives turned out to be incompetent, it could lead to serious problems in the administration. Lu Xun also foresaw that conflict was bound to break out between the two princes because they were equally influential and had their own factions supporting them. He believed that a power struggle between the princes would be detrimental to Eastern Wu's prosperity and stability. Quan Cong's son, Quan Ji (全寄), became a close aide to Sun Ba and helped him in his fight against Sun He. Lu Xun wrote to Quan Cong to warn him: "If you don't learn from Ma Midi and choose to let (Quan) Ji have his way, you'll bring disaster upon yourself and your family." Quan Cong ignored Lu Xun's advice and their relationship became strained. (Note: (先是，二宮並闕，中外職司多遣子弟給侍。全琮報遜，遜以為子弟苟有才，不憂不用，不宜私出以要榮利；若其不佳，終為取禍。且聞二宮勢敵，必有彼此，此古人之厚忌也。琮子寄，果阿附魯王，輕為交構。遜書與琮曰：「卿不師日磾，而宿留阿寄，終為足下門戶致禍矣。」琮旣不納，更以致隙。) Sanguozhi vol. 58.)

When there were rumours that Sun He could no longer secure his position as Crown Prince, Lu Xun wrote a memorial to Sun Quan: "The Crown Prince is the legitimate heir apparent so he should have a foundation as solid as hard rock. The Prince of Lu is a vassal and a subject of the state, so he should receive less favours than the Crown Prince. If both of them know their places, Your Majesty and all your subjects will have peace. I humbly kowtow and beg Your Majesty, to the point of bleeding (from my forehead), to (re)consider this issue carefully." He wrote several memorials to Sun Quan and even requested to leave Wuchang (武昌; present-day Ezhou, Hubei) and go to the capital to speak up on this problem. Sun Quan denied him permission. Lu Xun's maternal nephews Gu Tan, Gu Cheng (顧承) and Yao Xin (姚信), who supported Sun He during the succession struggle, were sent into exile. Wu Can, the Crown Prince's Tutor (太子太傅), who had been exchanging letters with Lu Xun, was imprisoned and later executed. (Note: (及太子有不安之議，遜上疏陳：「太子正統，宜有盤石之固，魯王藩臣，當使寵秩有差，彼此得所，上下獲安。謹叩頭流血以聞。」書三四上，及求詣都，欲口論適庶之分，以匡得失。旣不聽許，而遜外生顧譚、顧承、姚信，並以親附太子，枉見流徙。太子太傅吾粲坐數與遜交書，下獄死。) Sanguozhi vol. 58.)

=== Death and aftermath ===
Sun Quan repeatedly sent emissaries to Wuchang (武昌; present-day Ezhou, Hubei) to reprimand Lu Xun for interfering with the succession. Lu Xun died on 19 March 245 in anger and frustration at the age of 63 (by East Asian age reckoning). Lu Xun was a thrifty man. When he died, he left behind little or no wealth for his family. Sometime between 258 and 264, Sun Xiu, the third Wu emperor, awarded Lu Xun the posthumous title "Marquis Zhao" (昭侯; literally "illustrious marquis"). (Note: (權累遣中使責讓遜，遜憤恚致卒，時年六十三，家無餘財。 ... 孫休時，追謚遜曰昭侯。) Sanguozhi vol. 58.)

The succession struggle concluded in 250 – five years after Lu Xun's death – with Sun Quan deposing Sun He and replacing him with Sun Liang, and forcing Sun Ba to commit suicide. Many officials who were involved in the conflict (i.e., supported either Sun He or Sun Ba) met with unhappy ends. (Note: (權由是發怒，夫人憂死，而和寵稍損，懼於廢黜。 ... 譖毀旣行，太子以敗，霸亦賜死。) Sanguozhi vol. 59.)

In the winter of 251, about half a year before his death, Sun Quan regretted what he did to Lu Xun. When he was sending off Lu Xun's son Lu Kang back to Chaisang (柴桑), with tears in his eyes he told Lu Kang, "Previously, I believed slanderous rumours and failed to understand your father's well-meaning advice. I've let you down. I've burnt all the documents containing the allegations against your father so that nobody can ever see them."

== Appraisal ==
When Ji Yan proposed introducing drastic reforms in the Wu administration (which included the dismissal of many officials he deemed incompetent), Lu Xun cautioned Sun Quan against that and accurately predicted that it would lead to problems. (Note: See Ji Yan's article for more information.) Lu Xun once told Zhuge Ke, "I respect those who are superior to me in status; I assist those who are subordinate to me. I see you behave arrogantly in front of those superior to you, and you belittle those subordinate to you. This isn't the way to build a stable career." In another incident, Yang Zhu (楊笁) became famous in his youth, but Lu Xun predicted that he was doomed to failure, so he advised Yang Zhu's elder brother, Yang Mu (楊穆), to break ties with Yang Zhu. Lu Xun's prediction came true as Yang Zhu later got into trouble during the Sun He-Sun Ba succession struggle. (Note: (初，曁豔造營府之論，遜諫戒之，以為必禍。又謂諸葛恪曰：「在我前者，吾必奉之同升；在我下者，則扶持之。今觀君氣陵其上，意蔑乎下，非安德之基也。」又廣陵楊笁少獲聲名，而遜謂之終敗，勸笁兄穆令與別族。其先覩如此。) Sanguozhi vol. 58.)

The historian Chen Shou, who wrote Lu Xun's biography in the Records of the Three Kingdoms, commented on Lu Xun as such: "Liu Bei was a hero of his time and many people feared him. Lu Xun, then in his prime years and relatively unknown, managed to defeat Liu Bei. Lu Xun's brilliant strategies, when combined with Sun Quan's recognition of his talent, resulted in the accomplishment of a great task. Lu Xun was loyal, honest and sincere. He died worrying about his state's future, and was perhaps an important pillar of his state." (Note: (評曰：劉備天下稱雄，一世所憚，陸遜春秋方壯，威名未著，摧而克之，罔不如志。予旣奇遜之謀略，又歎權之識才，所以濟大事也。及遜忠誠懇至，憂國亡身，庶幾社稷之臣矣。) Sanguozhi vol. 58.)

== Family and relatives ==
Sometime after 216, when Lu Xun was commissioned as Colonel Who Establishes Might (定威校尉). Under Sun Quan's arrangement, Lu Xun married the eldest daughter of Sun Quan's elder brother and predecessor Sun Ce. (Note: (權以兄策女配遜， ...) Sanguozhi vol. 58.)

Lu Xun's eldest son, Lu Yan (陸延), died at a young age. Lu Xun's marquis title was inherited by his second son, Lu Kang (陸抗), who became a prominent general in Eastern Wu during the reign of the last Wu emperor Sun Hao. Lu Kang had six sons: Lu Yan (陸晏), Lu Jing (陸景), Lu Xuan (陸玄), Lu Ji (陸機), Lu Yun (陸雲) (Note: (長子延早夭，次子抗襲爵。 ... 秋遂卒，子晏嗣。晏及弟景、玄、機、雲分領抗兵。) Sanguozhi vol. 58.) and Lu Dan (陸耽). (Note: (... 并收雲及弟耽，並伏法。 ... 及機之誅，三族無遺， ... 事亦並在晉書。) Ji Yun Biezhuan annotation in Sanguozhi vol. 58.) (Note: See Lu Kang (Three Kingdoms)#Descendants for details.)

Lu Xun's younger brother, Lu Mao, also served as an official in Eastern Wu. (Note: (陸瑁字子璋，丞相遜弟也。) Sanguozhi vol. 57.)

Lu Ji, a son of Lu Xun's granduncle Lu Kang (陸康), was one of the 24 Filial Exemplars and served as an official under Sun Quan. (Note: (陸績字公紀，吳郡吳人也。父康，漢末為廬江太守。) Sanguozhi vol. 57.)

Lu Kai, a relative of Lu Xun, served as the ninth Imperial Chancellor of Eastern Wu. (Note: (陸凱字敬風，吳郡吳人，丞相遜族子也。) Sanguozhi vol. 61.)

== In Romance of the Three Kingdoms ==
Lu Xun appeared as a character in the historical novel Romance of the Three Kingdoms by Luo Guanzhong, which romanticises the historical events before and during the Three Kingdoms period. His most significant moment in the novel, apart from his role in the Battle of Xiaoting, is a fictional encounter he had after the battle. (Note: See Stone Sentinel Maze#Lu Xun's encounter for details.)

== In popular culture ==
Lu Xun is featured as a playable character in Koei's Dynasty Warriors video game series, as well as Warriors Orochi, a crossover between Dynasty Warriors and Samurai Warriors. He also appears in Koei's strategy game series Romance of the Three Kingdoms.

In the trading card game Magic: The Gathering, there is a card called "Lu Xun, Scholar General" in the Portal Three Kingdoms set.

He was played by the actor Shao Feng in the 2010 Chinese television series Three Kingdoms.

== See also ==
- Lists of people of the Three Kingdoms
