= Lu Ji (Gongji) =

Han dynasty scholar and official (188-219)

- 陸績
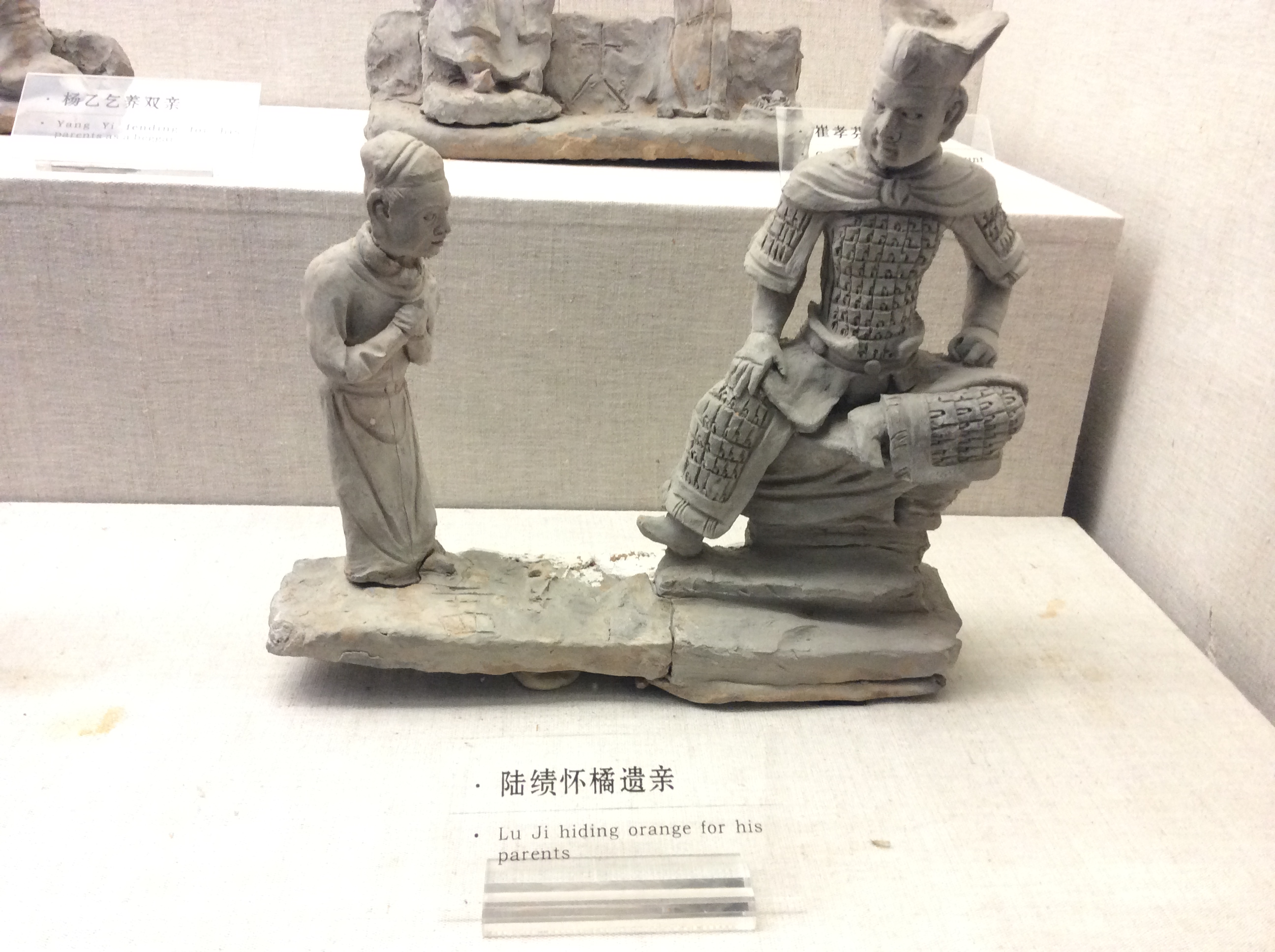
- Lu Ji hiding oranges for his parents. Jin dynasty (1115–1234) ceramic model of The Twenty-four Filial Exemplars in the Shanxi Museum.

Administrator of Yulin (鬱林太守) (under Sun Quan)
- In office ? – 219
- Monarch: Emperor Xian of Han

Lieutenant-General (偏將軍) (under Sun Quan)
- In office ? – 219
- Monarch: Emperor Xian of Han

Personal details
- Born: 188 Suzhou, Jiangsu
- Died: 219 (aged 31) Guiping, Guangxi
- Children: Lu Hong; Lu Rui; Lu Yusheng
- Parent: Lu Kang (father)
- Relatives: Lu Xun (second cousin once removed); Lu Mao (second cousin once removed); Gu Cheng's mother (second cousin once removed)
- Occupation: Scholar, politician
- Courtesy name: Gongji (公紀)

Lu Ji (188–219), courtesy name Gongji, was a Chinese politician and scholar serving under the warlord Sun Quan in the late Eastern Han dynasty of China. He was also one of the 24 Filial Exemplars.

== Life ==
Lu Ji was from Wu County, Wu Commandery, which is in present-day Suzhou, Jiangsu. His father, Lu Kang, served as the Administrator of Lujiang Commandery (廬江郡) towards the end of the Eastern Han dynasty. The Lu clan, which he was from, was one of the four most influential clans in Wu Commandery and also in the Jiangdong region at the time. (Note: The four great clans of Wu Commandery were the Gu (顧), Lu (陸), Zhu (朱) and Zhang (張) clans. The four great clans of the Jiangdong region were the Gu (顧), Lu (陸), Yu (虞) and Wei (魏) clans. Some notable members from each clan were: Gu Yong, Gu Shao and Gu Tan of the Gu clan; Lu Xun, Lu Ji and Lu Kai of the Lu clan; Zhu Huan and Zhu Ju of the Zhu clan; Zhang Wen of the Zhang clan; Yu Fan of the Yu clan; and Wei Teng (魏騰) of the Wei clan.) Lu Ji was also born late in his father's life. (Note: Lu Kang was in his early 60s when Lu Ji was born.)

When Lu Ji was six years old (by East Asian reckoning) (Note: Lu Ji was actually about five years old then. In East Asian tradition, a person is considered one year old in his/her first year of life. See East Asian age reckoning for details.), his father brought him to Jiujiang Commandery (九江郡) to visit Yuan Shu. Yuan Shu treated his guests to mandarin oranges. Lu Ji secretly took three oranges and hid them in his sleeve. When Lu Ji and his father were preparing to leave, the oranges suddenly rolled out of his sleeve. Yuan Shu said: "Young Man Lu, you came as a guest. Why did you hide the oranges?" Lu Ji knelt down and replied: "I want to bring them home for my mother." Yuan Shu was very impressed with Lu Ji. This incident is one of the 24 stories of filial piety in the Confucian classic The Twenty-four Filial Exemplars.

In the late 190s, after the warlord Sun Ce had conquered lands in the Wu region and established his domain there, he invited scholars such as Zhang Zhao, Zhang Hong and Qin Song to discuss with him how to bring peace to the Han Empire. Lu Ji was among the scholars. As their seating positions were determined by their ages, Lu Ji took the furthest seat because he was the youngest. When they were talking about using military force to bring about peace, Lu Ji raised his voice and said: "In the past, when Guan Yiwu served as a chancellor under Duke Huan of Qi, the Duke was able to unite the various lords under his control and bring order to the Empire without resorting to military force. Confucius once said, 'If remoter people are not submissive, all the influences of civil culture and virtue are to be cultivated to attract them to be so.' (Note: Lu Ji quoted from chapter 16 of the Analects. See the English translation for this line here.) Those who are present at this discussion speak of only using military force, and nothing about promoting civil culture and virtue. I, Ji, may be young and ignorant, but I don't feel at ease (after hearing what you said)." Zhang Zhao and the others were very surprised by Lu Ji's response.

Lu Ji had a majestic appearance and was known for being very well read in various fields, including astronomy, calendar science and mathematics. He was also a friend of other scholars such as Yu Fan and Pang Tong, who were much older than him.

In 200, Sun Ce died and was succeeded by his younger brother, Sun Quan. After Sun Quan took control of the Wu lands, he recruited Lu Ji to serve as an assistant clerk under him. Lu Ji subsequently served as the Administrator of Yulin Commandery (鬱林郡; around present-day Guiping, Guangxi). He was also promoted to Lieutenant-General (偏將軍) and placed in command of 2,000 troops. However, Lu Ji did not aspire to be an official, because he not only had physical disabilities, but also because he was actually interested in scholarly pursuits. Nevertheless, throughout his career, he never gave up on academia even though he was busy with military affairs. He created the Hun Tian Tu (渾天圖) and annotated the Yijing and Taixuanjing, and his works were spread around later.

When Lu Ji sensed that his death was imminent, he wrote: "During the Han dynasty, there lived Lu Ji, a man from Wu Commandery who had lofty ambitions. When he was young, he read the Classic of Poetry and Book of Documents. When he reached adulthood, he was already very familiar with the Classic of Rites and Yi Jing. He received orders to lead a military campaign to the south, but was struck by illness. How unfortunate his life was! He died with regrets and sorrow!" He also wrote: "About more than 60 years from now, vehicles will be able to travel on the same roads, and books will be written in the same script. It is unfortunate that I will not be able to witness that." He died at the age of 32 (by East Asian age reckoning). (Note: Lu Ji was alluding to the achievements of Qin Shihuang. His prediction was rather prescient as in 280, Emperor Wu of Jin completed the reunification of China under the Jin dynasty (266-420).)

== Family and relatives ==
Lu Ji was a second cousin once removed of Lu Xun. Although he was born about five years later than Lu Xun, he was actually one generation older than the latter. His father, Lu Kang (Lu Xun's granduncle), raised Lu Xun, who was orphaned at a young age. After Lu Kang's death, Lu Xun became the new head of the family because he was older than Lu Ji in terms of age.

Lu Ji had two sons and a daughter. His elder son, Lu Hong (陸宏), served as the South Commandant (南部都尉) of Kuaiji Commandery in Eastern Wu. His younger son, Lu Rui (陸叡), was a Changshui Colonel (長水校尉). Lu Ji's daughter, Lu Yusheng, was born in Yulin Commandery. Her name was inspired by her place of birth because "Yusheng" means "born in Yu(lin)". She married Zhang Wen's younger brother Zhang Bai (張白). As Lu Ji died early, his three children – who were still very young when their father died – were adopted and raised by Lu Xun's younger brother Lu Mao.

== Appraisal ==
Chen Shou, who wrote Lu Ji's biography in the Records of the Three Kingdoms (Sanguozhi), appraised Lu Ji as follows: "Lu Ji's contributions to Yang Xiong's Taixuanjing were equivalent to Zuo Qiuming's contributions to Confucius's Spring and Autumn Annals and Zhuangzi's contributions to Laozi's Daodejing. When such a great talent like him who was capable of doing better tasks was sent to defend the southern border, his life was ruined!"

Pang Tong once described Lu Ji as "a horse that cannot run fast but has strong willpower".

A verse from The Twenty-four Filial Exemplars in Lu Ji's honour reads:

"Filial piety is in human nature,
Most rare in a six-year-old boy.
He hid three oranges in his sleeve, as a gift for his Mother,
Just a token to repay her kindness without end." (Note: The original text in Chinese is [孝順皆天性，人間六歲兒。袖中懷綠桔，遺母事堪奇。]. The translated text is adapted from this English translation.)

== In Romance of the Three Kingdoms ==
Lu Ji appears briefly in Chapter 43 of the 14th-century historical novel Romance of the Three Kingdoms. He is one of the Wu scholars who debate with Zhuge Liang over Sun Quan's decision to ally with Liu Bei against Cao Cao before the Battle of Red Cliffs. Lu Ji argues: "Even though Cao Cao controls the Emperor and holds sway over the lords, he is still a descendant of the chancellor Cao Shen. Liu Bei may be a descendant of Prince Jing of Zhongshan, but there is no proof for this. As far as we see, he is no more than a straw mat weaver and shoe seller. How can he compete with Cao Cao?" Zhuge Liang replies: "Aren't you the 'Young Man Lu' who hid oranges in his sleeve at Yuan Shu's house? Please sit down and listen to me. Since Cao Cao is a descendant of Chancellor Cao, he is therefore a subject of the Han Empire. However, he monopolises state power and bullies the Emperor. This is a disgrace to his ancestor. He is not only a villain of the Han Empire, but also a miscreant of the Cao family! Liu Bei is a member of the imperial clan. His Majesty the Emperor checked the family records and granted him a title. How can you say there is no proof? Although Emperor Gaozu started off as a patrol officer, he became an Emperor eventually. What is so shameful about weaving straw mats and selling shoes? Your opinions are those of a child. You are not fit to speak with learned men!" Lu Ji falls silent.

== In popular culture ==
Yu Rongguang portrayed Lu Ji in The Legend of Incorruptible Stone (廉石传奇), a 2011 Chinese television series loosely based on Lu Ji's life. It is aimed at promoting anti-corruption in governments.

== See also ==
- Lists of people of the Three Kingdoms
- The Twenty-four Filial Exemplars
