= Lu Mao =

Chinese Eastern Wu official (died 239)

- 陸瑁

Consultant (議郎)
- In office 232 – 239
- Monarch: Sun Quan

Personal details
- Born: Unknown (Note: Lu Mao's elder brother Lu Xun was born in 183.); Suzhou, Jiangsu
- Died: 239
- Children: unnamed first son; Lu Xi; Lu Ying
- Parent: Lu Jun (father)
- Relatives: Lu Xun (brother); Gu Cheng's mother (sister); Lu Kang (granduncle); Lu Ji (second cousin once removed); Lu Kai (relative)
- Occupation: Politician
- Courtesy name: Zizhang (子璋)

Lu Mao (died 239), courtesy name Zizhang, was a Chinese politician of the state of Eastern Wu during the Three Kingdoms period of China. He was a younger brother of Lu Xun, a prominent politician and general who served as the third Imperial Chancellor of Eastern Wu.

== Life ==
Lu Mao was a younger brother of Lu Xun. His ancestral home was in Wu County, Wu Commandery, which is in present-day Suzhou, Jiangsu. At a young age, he was already known for being a keen learner and for valuing righteousness. Some of his friends – Chen Rong (陳融), Puyang Yi, Jiang Zuan (蔣纂) and Yuan Di (袁迪) – were from humble backgrounds but had great ambitions. Lu Mao, who was from a more affluent family, often shared his wealth with them. Xu Yuan (徐原), who was also from Wu Commandery, moved to Kuaiji Commandery. He had never met Lu Mao before, but before his death, he wrote to Lu Mao and requested Lu to help him take care of his young son. Lu Mao obliged, had a proper tomb constructed for Xu Yuan, and adopted Xu Yuan's son. Lu Mao's second cousin-uncle, Lu Ji, died early, leaving behind two sons and one daughter who were still very young then. Lu Mao adopted Lu Ji's children and raised them. They left him only after they reached adulthood. The commandery officials wanted to recruit Lu Mao to join the civil service but he refused.

Ji Yan, one of Lu Mao's colleagues, was notorious for being very critical of others. When he was serving as a Master of Writing in the Selection Bureau (選曹尚書; i.e., the equivalent of a present-day human resources officer), he often went around spreading news of scandalous incidents involving his colleagues just to show how harsh he could be in criticising others. Lu Mao advised him to forgive others for their past transgressions and focus on praising them for their virtues and contributions instead. He also urged Ji Yan to promote and strengthen a civil culture that might be beneficial to Wu's future developments. Ji Yan ignored Lu Mao's advice and eventually met his downfall. (Note: See Ji Yan's article for more details on this incident.)

In 232, Lu Mao was summoned to the Wu imperial court and was appointed as a Consultant (議郎) and Master of Writing in the Selection Bureau. The Wu emperor Sun Quan hated the warlord Gongsun Yuan for breaking his promise to ally with him against Wu's rival state, Cao Wei. He planned to personally lead an army to attack Gongsun Yuan. Lu Mao wrote a memorial to Sun Quan to dissuade him from launching the campaign, in which he explained the perils of travelling far to attack a distant enemy and pointed out some negative consequences that may result from the campaign, such as the Shanyue tribes taking advantage of Sun Quan's absence to cause trouble in the Wu region. Sun Quan disagreed with Lu Mao. Lu Mao then wrote another memorial to Sun Quan, advising him to refrain from attacking Gongsun Yuan, and focus on maintaining stability in Wu and making long term defence preparations instead. Sun Quan felt that Lu Mao was very sincere when he wrote the memorial so he abandoned the idea of attacking Gongsun Yuan.

Wen Renmin (聞人敏), a man from the same hometown as Lu Mao, once visited the Wu capital. He received a grand reception that was even better than that normally received by nobles. Lu Mao thought that this was inappropriate according to Confucian rules of propriety because he believed the level of the reception should be based on the person's social status. He was proven right later. He died in 239.

== Family and relatives ==
Lu Mao's elder brother, Lu Xun, was a prominent general and politician in Eastern Wu. He held office for about a year as the third Imperial Chancellor of Wu before his death in 245. As Lu Xun and Lu Mao were orphaned when they were young, they were raised by their granduncle Lu Kang, who served as the Administrator (太守) of Lujiang Commandery (廬江郡) in the late Eastern Han dynasty. Lu Kang's son, Lu Ji, was a scholar who served as an official under Wu's founding emperor, Sun Quan. Lu Ji was also one of the 24 Filial Exemplars. Lu Mao took care of Lu Ji's daughter, Lu Yusheng, and his younger sons after his death.

Lu Mao had at least three sons. There are no details about his first son in historical records. His second son was Lu Xi (陸喜), whose courtesy name was Gongzhong (恭仲) or Wenzhong (文仲). Lu Xi was known for being studious and sociable. He served as a Master of Writing in the Selection Bureau (選曹尚書) and later in the Ministry of Personnel during the reign of the last Wu emperor, Sun Hao. After Wu was conquered by the Jin dynasty in 280, Lu Xi served in the Jin government as a Regular Mounted Attendant (散騎常侍). Lu Xi died in c.June 284.

Lu Mao's third son, Lu Ying (陸英), served as a Regular Mounted Attendant and as the Chancellor of Gaoping (高平相) in the Jin dynasty. Lu Ying's son, Lu Ye (陸曄; 261 — 21 October 334), whose courtesy name was Shiguang (士光), also served in the Jin government and rose to the position of General of Chariots and Cavalry (車騎將車). Lu Ye's younger brother Lu Wan (陸玩; 278 — 7 January 342), whose courtesy name was Shiyao (士瑤), was known for being magnanimous. Lu Wan also served in the Jin government and held office as the Minister of Works. He was posthumously granted the position of Grand Commandant.

== Appraisal ==
Chen Shou, who wrote Lu Mao's official biography in the Records of the Three Kingdoms (Sanguozhi), appraised Lu Mao as follows: "Lu Mao valued righteousness and gave pertinent advice. He may be regarded as a junzi (Confucian gentleman)."

== See also ==
- Lists of people of the Three Kingdoms
