= Ji Yan (Eastern Wu) =

Eastern Wu state official (died 224)

- 暨豔

Master of Writing in the Selection Bureau (選曹尚書)
- In office ? – 224
- Monarch: Sun Quan

Personal details
- Born: Unknown; Suzhou, Jiangsu
- Died: 224
- Occupation: Politician
- Courtesy name: Zixiu (子休)

Ji Yan (died 224), courtesy name Zixiu, was a Chinese politician of the state of Eastern Wu during the Three Kingdoms period of China. An impulsive and impetuous man, he thought highly of himself and liked to assume the moral high ground to criticise and disparage others. While serving in the selection bureau (the equivalent of a present-day human resources department), he came up with radical ideas to reform the bureaucracy by demoting or dismissing officials based on assessments of their moral character. His ideas proved to be highly unpopular as he incurred much resentment from his colleagues, who accused him of being unprofessional and biased. When his colleagues Lu Xun, Lu Mao and Zhu Ju advised him to change his offensive behaviour, he ignored their well-meaning advice. In 224, he committed suicide after he was removed from office on allegations of unprofessional conduct.

== Life ==
Ji Yan was from Wu Commandery, which is around present-day Suzhou, Jiangsu. Through the recommendation of Zhang Wen, he came to serve in the Eastern Wu government and was appointed as a Gentleman in the Selection Bureau (選曹郎; the equivalent of a present-day human resources officer). Over time, he rose through the ranks and became a Master of Writing in the Selection Bureau (選曹尚書).

Ji Yan had a tendency to offend people not only because of his straightforward and impetuous character, but also because he thought highly of himself and liked to assume the moral high ground to criticise and disparage others. In particular, he liked to highlight others' faults and spread news of scandalous incidents involving others, just to make himself seem better and show how critical he could be. In his view, there was a serious problem of human resources mismanagement in the bureaucracy as many officials were unsuitable for their jobs because they were either administratively incompetent or morally corrupt. He thus came up with radical ideas to reform the bureaucracy according to the way he desired: he wanted to conduct a thorough assessment of all personnel to separate the virtuous from the corrupt, and then demote or dismiss them accordingly. If his ideas were implemented, over 90 percent of all the staff would be affected and many who failed the "morality test" would end up being demoted to jun li (軍吏), one of the lowest positions in the bureaucracy. Because of his radical ideas, Ji Yan incurred much resentment from several officials, who accused him of being unprofessional and biased.

Sometime between 222 and 225, Ji Yan and Zhang Wen made accusations against Sun Shao, the Imperial Chancellor. It is not known what exactly Sun Shao was accused of. When Sun Shao requested to be removed from office, the Eastern Wu emperor Sun Quan pardoned him and ordered him to continue serving as Imperial Chancellor.

At least three officials – Lu Xun, Lu Mao and Zhu Ju – warned Ji Yan on separate occasions and advised him to stop his offensive behaviour. Lu Mao advised Ji Yan to forgive others for their past transgressions and focus on praising them for their virtues and contributions instead. He also urged Ji Yan to promote and strengthen a civil culture that might be beneficial to Eastern Wu's future development. Zhu Ju voiced his concerns that the abrupt demotion/dismissal of so many officials would cause instability in the government, and urged Ji Yan to refrain from penalising officials for their transgressions and allow them to remain in office to make amends for their mistakes. He also suggested to Ji Yan to praise the honest and hardworking officials and give encouragement to the underperforming ones. Ji Yan ignored all their well-meaning advice.

Although Ji Yan's radical ideas drew flak from his colleagues, there was one Xu Biao (徐彪) (Note: Xu Biao's courtesy name was Zhongyu (仲虞) and he was from Guangling Commandery (廣陵郡). He served as a Gentleman in the Selection Bureau (選曹郎).) who supported him. In 224, the Eastern Wu emperor Sun Quan had Ji Yan and Xu Biao arrested and removed from office based on allegations of unprofessional conduct. Both of them committed suicide later. Zhang Wen was implicated in the incident not only because he recommended Ji Yan to the Eastern Wu government, but also because he was a close friend of Ji Yan and Xu Biao; he was first arrested and imprisoned, but was later pardoned and sent back to his hometown, where he died six years later.

== See also ==
- Lists of people of the Three Kingdoms
