= Wu County =

Former county in China

Coordinates: 31°18′46″N 120°37′07″E

Wuxian
- Traditional Chinese: 吳縣
- Simplified Chinese: 吴县
- Postal: Wuhsien
Transcriptions
Standard Mandarin
- Hanyu Pinyin: Wúxiàn
- Wade–Giles: Wu^{2}-hsien^{4}

Wu County or Wuxian (simplified Chinese: 吴县; traditional Chinese: 吳縣; pinyin: Wúxiàn; 221 B.C. – December 2000) is a former county and city located in modern Suzhou City, Jiangsu Province. Its name refers to its former status as the capital of the state of Wu during the Spring and Autumn period.

== History ==
In 221 BC, Emperor Qin Shi Huang established Wu County as the capital of Kuaiji Commandery. The city itself was often known as Kuaiji from this role, prior to return of Kuaiji's administration to present-day Shaoxing on the southern shore of Hangzhou Bay.

In 1928, the government of the Republic of China split the urban area of Wu County and set up Suzhou City. Two years later, the decision was withdrawn. After the establishment of the People's Republic of China, Suzhou City was divided from Wu County again in 1949. In March 1983, Wu County became a county of prefecture-level city Suzhou. In June 1995, Wu County was renamed to Wuxian City, a county-level city. In December 2000, it was divided into two districts, currently known as Wuzhong District and Xiangcheng District.

== Notable people ==
- Cai Han, Qing dynasty artist
- Li Minhua, aerospace engineer and physicist
