= Pan Jun =

Eastern Wu minister and general (died 239)

- 潘濬

Minister of Ceremonies (太常)
- In office 229 – 239
- Monarch: Sun Quan

Minister Steward (少府)
- In office 229
- Monarch: Sun Quan

General of Vehement Might (奮威將軍)
- In office 220 – 229
- Monarch: Sun Quan

General of the Household Who Assists the Army (輔軍中郎將)
- In office 220

Personal details
- Born: Unknown Changde, Hunan
- Died: 239
- Relations: Jiang Wan (relative)
- Children: Pan Zhu; Pan Mi; Sun Lü's wife
- Occupation: Minister, general
- Courtesy name: Chengming (承明)
- Peerage: Marquis of Liuyang (劉陽侯)

Pan Jun (died 239), courtesy name Chengming, was a minister and military general of the state of Eastern Wu during the Three Kingdoms period of China. Originally a minor official serving under the warlords Liu Biao and later Liu Bei in Jing Province, Pan Jun reluctantly switched allegiance to another warlord Sun Quan after Sun Quan seized control of Liu Bei's territories in Jing Province in 220. While serving under Sun Quan, Pan Jun held military commands and quelled a rebellion. After Sun Quan became emperor in 229, he appointed Pan Jun as Minister Steward and later Minister of Ceremonies. During this time, Pan Jun joined the general Lü Dai in suppressing a rebellion by indigenous tribes in his native Wuling Commandery (around present-day Changde, Hunan). He also oversaw civil and military affairs in Wuchang (present-day Ezhou, Hubei) alongside the general Lu Xun. In the 230s, he repeatedly spoke up against Lü Yi's abuses of power and even planned to assassinate him. Throughout his life, Pan Jun was known for being a man of bold character and an honest official who strictly and fairly upheld the law without fearing how others would see him.

== Early life and career ==
Pan Jun was born in Hanshou County (漢壽縣), Wuling Commandery (武陵郡), which is located northeast of present-day Changde, Hunan, towards the end of the Eastern Han dynasty. After he reached adulthood around the age of 20, he studied under the tutelage of the scholar Song Zhong (宋忠; also known as Song Zhongzi 宋仲子). He was known for being intelligent, observant, and capable of providing well-thought and well-reasoned responses to questions. Wang Can, one of the "Seven Scholars of Jian'an", once said that Pan Jun was an extraordinary talent. After receiving such high praise from a famous intellectual like Wang Can, Pan Jun became more well known in his home commandery. The Administrator of Wuling Commandery appointed him as an Officer of Merit (功曹) to serve in the commandery office.

Before Pan Jun reached the age of 29, Liu Biao, the Governor of Jing Province (covering present-day Hubei and Hunan), recruited him to serve as an Assistant Officer (從事) in Jiangxia Commandery (江夏郡; around present-day Xinzhou District, Wuhan, Hubei). At the time, the Chief of Shaxian County (沙羨縣; around present-day Wuchang District, Wuhan, Hubei), which was under Jiangxia Commandery, was notorious for his corruption. Pan Jun conducted an investigation, found him guilty of corruption, and had him executed according to the law. His actions stunned everyone in Jiangxia Commandery. Pan Jun was later reassigned to Xiangxiang County to serve as the county's Prefect (令). He gained a reputation for good governance during his tenure.

== Service under Liu Bei ==
Around late 209, when the warlord Liu Bei became the Governor of Jing Province, he appointed Pan Jun to serve as an Assistant Officer in the Headquarters Office (治中從事). Between 212 and 214, when Liu Bei was away on a campaign to seize control of Yi Province (covering present-day Sichuan and Chongqing) from its governor Liu Zhang, he left Pan Jun behind to assist his general Guan Yu in guarding his territories in Jing Province and overseeing daily affairs.

Between November 219 and February 220, Liu Bei's ally Sun Quan broke the Sun–Liu alliance and ordered his general Lü Meng to lead a stealth invasion of Liu Bei's territories in Jing Province while Guan Yu was away at the Battle of Fancheng. After failing to take Fancheng, Guan Yu returned to Jing Province only to find out that Lü Meng had conquered his key bases in Gong'an County and Nan Commandery (南郡; around present-day Jingzhou, Hubei). While attempting to retreat to Yi Province to join Liu Bei, Guan Yu was captured in an ambush and executed by Sun Quan's forces.

== Service under Sun Quan ==
=== Joining Sun Quan ===
After Sun Quan conquered Liu Bei's territories in Jing Province, most of the officials there agreed to surrender and serve under him. Pan Jun, however, claimed that he was ill, stayed at home and refused to get out of bed. Sun Quan then sent his servants to Pan Jun's residence and carry his bed over with him lying on it. As Pan Jun lay face down, crying and sobbing in a disconsolate manner, Sun Quan comforted him and told him: "Chengming, in the past, Guan Dingfu was a captive from Ruo, yet King Wu appointed him as a military commander; Peng Zhongshuang was a captive from Shen, yet King Wen appointed him as prime minister. Although these two famous men were initially captives from other states, the kings of Chu still employed them and gave them the opportunity to leave their names in history as great statesmen of Chu. Are you not willing to surrender and join me because you think I am not as magnanimous as these kings of ancient times?"

Sun Quan then ordered his servants to use a piece of cloth to wipe away the tears from Pan Jun's face. Pan Jun got out of bed, knelt down and agreed to surrender and serve under Sun Quan. Sun Quan then appointed him as an Attendant Official at Headquarters (治中) and often consulted him on affairs related to Jing Province. Some time later, Sun Quan commissioned Pan Jun as General of the Household Who Assists the Army (輔軍中郎將) and put him in command of troops.

=== Quelling a rebellion in Wuling Commandery ===
In early 220, Fan Zhou (樊伷), a former official in Wuling Commandery (武陵郡; around present-day Changde, Hunan), which used to be under Liu Bei's control, incited the indigenous tribes in Wuling to rebel against Sun Quan. When Sun Quan's other subjects said that they needed at least 10,000 troops to suppress the rebellion, Sun Quan rejected their idea and asked Pan Jun for his opinion. When Pan Jun said that 5,000 troops would suffice, Sun Quan asked him, "What makes you so confident?" Pan Jun replied: "Fan Zhou is from an old clan in Nanyang Commandery. Although he has a way with words, he doesn't have the talents of an orator. I know this because Fan Zhou once said that he would prepare a day-long feast for the folks in the commandery, but the food never showed up by midday so about ten people got up and left. This is like seeing through a dwarf's lies about his true height." Sun Quan laughed and accepted Pan Jun's suggestion. Pan Jun led 5,000 troops to deal with Fan Zhou and succeeded in eliminating him and quelling the rebellion.

As a reward for his success, Pan Jun was promoted to General of Vehement Might (奮威將軍) and enfeoffed as the Marquis of Changqian Village (常遷亭侯). When Rui Xuan (芮玄) died, Pan Jun took over command of his troops and moved to the garrison at Xiakou (夏口; in present-day Wuhan, Hubei).

=== As Minister Steward and Minister of Ceremonies ===
In 229, after Sun Quan declared himself emperor of the state of Eastern Wu (or simply Wu), he appointed Pan Jun as Minister Steward (少府) and elevated him from the status of a village marquis to a county marquis under the title "Marquis of Liuyang" (劉陽侯).

Pan Jun was soon promoted to Minister of Ceremonies (太常) and stationed in Wuchang (武昌; present-day Ezhou, Hubei). Around March or April 231, the indigenous tribes living in Wuxi (五谿; literally "five streams"; referring to an area around present-day Huaihua, Hunan) rebelled against Wu rule, Sun Quan granted Pan Jun acting imperial authority and ordered him to supervise the general Lü Dai as he led 50,000 troops to pacify the rebellion. During this time, Pan Jun ensured that promises were kept, and rewards and punishments were given out fairly. By December 234, the rebellion ended with over 10,000 rebels killed or taken captive. The indigenous tribes also became so drastically weakened that they could not rebel again in a long time.

At the end of the four-year-long campaign, around December 234 or January 235, Pan Jun returned to Wuchang, where he was previously stationed. When he was in Wuchang, he and the Wu general Lu Xun were in charge of civil and military affairs in Jing Province.

=== Attempting to assassinate Lü Yi ===
Sometime the 230s, Sun Quan appointed Lü Yi as the supervisor of the bureau in charge of auditing and reviewing the work of all officials throughout Wu. The bureau essentially functioned like a modern secret service and served as a precursor to the censorate of later Chinese dynasties. Lü Yi freely abused his powers by falsely accusing many officials of serious offences, resulting in some of them being wrongfully arrested, imprisoned and tortured. His victims included the Imperial Chancellor Gu Yong and the general Zhu Ju.

Lü Yi initially wanted to make a case against Gu Yong for incompetence and ask Sun Quan to remove him from office. However, after an official Xie Gong (謝厷) reminded him that Pan Jun, the Minister of Ceremonies, would most likely succeed Gu Yong as Imperial Chancellor, Lü Yi immediately dropped the case against Gu Yong. This was because he knew that Pan Jun resented him and would take action against him if he became Imperial Chancellor.

Pan Jun managed to seek permission from Sun Quan to leave his post at Wuchang (武昌; present-day Ezhou, Hubei) and return to the Wu imperial capital, Jianye (present-day Nanjing, Jiangsu). Although he wanted to speak up about Lü Yi's abuses of power, he decided to take matters into his own hands after seeing that Sun Quan paid no attention to the crown prince Sun Deng, who had already voiced concerns to his father about Lü Yi on numerous occasions. He pretended to host a banquet, invited all his colleagues to attend, and hoped to use the opportunity to assassinate Lü Yi, whom he regarded as a threat to the Eastern Wu state. Lü Yi caught wind of Pan Jun's plan, so he lied that he was ill and did not show up.

Despite his failure to assassinate Lü Yi, Pan Jun did not stop speaking up about Lü Yi's wicked deeds every time he had an opportunity to meet Sun Quan. Over time, Lü Yi fell out of Sun Quan's trust and favour, and his abuses of power eventually came to light in 238. Sun Quan removed him from office, ordered Gu Yong to thoroughly investigate his crimes, and had him executed. After the Lü Yi scandal was over, Sun Quan sent an apology to all his senior officials for not heeding their advice and urging them to point out his mistakes.

=== Death ===
Pan Jun died in 239. His son, Pan Zhu (潘翥), inherited his peerage and became the next Marquis of Liuyang (劉陽侯).

== Family ==
Pan Jun's daughter married Sun Quan's second son, Sun Lü, the Marquis of Jianchang.

Pan Jun had two sons: Pan Zhu (潘翥) and Pan Mi (潘祕). The elder son, Pan Zhu, had the courtesy name Wenlong (文龍). He was commissioned as a Cavalry Commandant (騎都尉) and held command of troops but died early. The younger son, Pan Mi, married a half-sister of Sun Quan (Note: See Eastern Wu family trees#Sun Jian) and served as the Prefect of Xiangxiang County. There was one Xi Wen (習溫) from Xiangyang who served as the Grand Rectifier (大公平; a.k.a. 大中正) of Jing Province. Pan Mi once visited Xi Wen and asked him: "My late father once said that you would become the Grand Rectifier of this province. His prediction came true. Who do you think will succeed you?" Xi Wen replied: "None other than you." Pan Mi later rose to the position of Supervisor of the Masters of Writing (尚書僕射) and eventually succeeded Xi Wen as the Grand Rectifier of Jing Province.

== Anecdotes ==
=== Dissuading Sun Quan from hunting pheasants ===
Sun Quan was fond of hunting pheasants but Pan Jun advised him against it. Sun Quan asked him: "Why is it that after the last time we parted ways, you no longer enjoy hunting pheasants now as much as you did?" Pan Jun replied: "The Empire has yet to be pacified. There are so many things to do. Pheasant hunting is not something urgent. However, if bows and bowstrings get damaged during hunting, that will become a big problem (because we need bows to be functional in wartime). I hope that Your Majesty will stop hunting pheasants for the sake of your subjects." He then destroyed his own parasol, which was made from pheasant feathers. Sun Quan then stopped and never went pheasant hunting again.

=== Advising Sun Quan to deny Bu Zhi permission to recruit soldiers ===
Between 226 and 230, when the Wu general Bu Zhi was stationed at Oukou (漚口; in present-day Changsha, Hunan), he wrote to Sun Quan to seek permission to recruit men from the various commanderies in southern Jing Province to serve in the Wu army. When Sun Quan sought Pan Jun's opinion on this issue, the latter said: "When overbearing generals are given access to the common people, they will cause harm and chaos to them. Bu Zhi's fame comes from the flattery and exaggeration by people around him. Your Majesty shouldn't approve his request." Sun Quan heeded Pan Jun's advice.

=== Executing Xu Zong for lawless behaviour ===
There was one Xu Zong (徐宗) from Yuzhang Commandery (豫章郡; around present-day Nanchang, Jiangxi) who served as a general under Sun Quan. Xu Zong was a friend of Kong Rong and was well known among the literati. When he visited Jianye (present-day Nanjing, Jiangsu, the Wu imperial capital, he allowed his subordinates to behave lawlessly and do as they please. Pan Jun, who was known for strictly upholding the law without worrying about how others would see him, ordered Xu Zong to be arrested and executed for breaking the law.

=== Stopping his son from associating with Yin Fan ===
Yin Fan (隱蕃), an official who used to serve Wu's rival state Wei before defecting to Wu, was well-acquainted with many Wu officials because he was a good speaker. Pan Jun's son, Pan Zhu (潘翥), befriended him and even sent him gifts.

When Pan Jun found out, he was so furious that he wrote a letter to his son as follows: "I have received grace from the State, therefore I should make it my mission to do my best to serve the State. When a young man like you comes to the Imperial Capital, you should behave in a respectful and humble manner, and seek to build ties with people who are known for their virtues and wisdom. Why do you choose to associate yourself with a defector from our rival state and even send him gifts? I may be far away from the Imperial Capital now, but I was very shocked, angry and worried when I heard about what you did. After you read this letter, I want you to ask the authorities to flog you 100 times as a punishment, and I want you to take back the gifts from Yin Fan."

At the time, many people felt surprised by Pan Jun's response and thought that he was too harsh with his son. However, after Yin Fan was executed for rebelling against Wu later, everyone became convinced that Pan Jun was right to stop his son from associating with Yin Fan.

=== Alleged secret dealings with Jiang Wan ===
An uncle of Pan Jun married a sister of Jiang Wan, a senior official of Wu's ally state Shu. In March or April 231, Wei Jing (衞旌), the Wu-appointed Administrator of Wuling Commandery (武陵郡; around present-day Changde, Hunan), reported to Sun Quan that Pan Jun had been secretly making contact with Jiang Wan with the intention of defecting to Shu. After reading Wei Jing's report, Sun Quan remarked, "Chengming won't do this." He then sealed Wei Jing's report and showed it to Pan Jun. At the same time, he removed Wei Jing from office and recalled him to Jianye (present-day Nanjing, Jiangsu), the Wu imperial capital.

== In Romance of the Three Kingdoms ==
Pan Jun appears as a minor character in the 14th-century historical novel Romance of the Three Kingdoms, which romanticises the historical events before and during the Three Kingdoms period. In the novel, Guan Yu leaves Pan Jun behind to guard Liu Bei's territories in Jing Province while he is away at the Battle of Fancheng. Before he left, Wang Fu tries to dissuade him from putting Pan Jun in charge, saying that Pan Jun is a selfish and jealous person. He recommends the frontline supply officer Zhao Lei (趙累), saying that Zhao Lei is loyal and honest and they will have nothing to worry about if Zhao Lei is in charge. Guan Yu, however, says that he knows Pan Jun's character well and refuses to replace Pan Jun with Zhao Lei since it is too troublesome to change their assignments. He also tells Wang Fu that he is overly suspicious.

== See also ==
- Lists of people of the Three Kingdoms
