= Lü Yi (Eastern Wu) =

Chinese official of the state of Eastern Wu (died 238)

- 呂壹

Gentleman Auditor of the Palace Writers (中書典校郎)
- In office ? – 238
- Monarch: Sun Quan
- Chancellor: Gu Yong

Personal details
- Born: Unknown
- Died: 238; Nanjing, Jiangsu
- Occupation: Politician

Lü Yi (died 238) was a Chinese politician of the state of Eastern Wu during the Three Kingdoms period of China. Highly trusted by Wu's founding emperor Sun Quan, he served as the supervisor of the audit bureau in charge of auditing and reviewing the work of all officials in both the central and regional governments. (Note: Although zhongshu dianxiao lang (中書典校郎) was a relatively low position within the hierarchy of the bureaucracy, the person holding this position wielded great power because he and the bureau under him had the authority to audit and review the work of all officials in both the central government and regional governments. In some ways, this bureau functioned like a modern secret service and served as a precursor to the censorate of later Chinese dynasties. The supervisor of this bureau must, of course, be someone whom the emperor highly trusted. In this case, it was Lü Yi.) A harsh, cruel and treacherous man, he freely abused his powers by falsely accusing many officials of serious offences, resulting in some of them being wrongfully arrested, imprisoned and tortured. Among his victims, the most notable ones were the general Zhu Ju and the Imperial Chancellor Gu Yong. He was eventually executed in 238 after his crimes and abuses of power came to light.

== Appointment as an auditor ==
There is nothing recorded in history about Lü Yi's origins and background. However, it is known that he served as a Gentleman Palace Writer (中書郎; an imperial secretary) in the Eastern Wu government during the reign of Sun Quan, the founding emperor of Wu. Sun Quan highly trusted Lü Yi and appointed him as the supervisor of a bureau in charge of auditing documents from all the departments in the central government, as well as those from the regional governments. Although the full name of Lü Yi's position was zhongshu dianxiao lang (中書典校郎; "Gentleman Auditor of the Palace Writers"), he was also referred to as xiaoshi (校事; "auditor/inspector") or xiaoguan (校官; "auditing/inspecting official") in short.

A harsh, cruel and treacherous man, Lü Yi abused the emperor's trust in him by picking on trivialities and falsely accusing numerous officials of committing serious offences. Along with his colleague Qin Bo (秦博), Lü Yi freely abused his powers to investigate and prosecute officials, many of whom were wrongfully arrested, imprisoned and tortured.

== Abuses of power ==
Some of the officials who fell victim to Lü Yi's abuses of power were the general Zhu Ju, the Imperial Chancellor Gu Yong, and the commandery administrators Diao Jia (刁嘉) and Zheng Zhou (鄭胄). In Zhu Ju's case, which happened sometime in the 230s, Lü Yi falsely accused him of embezzling military funds when some funds designated for Zhu Ju's army went missing. Zhu Ju, unable to explain himself, suffered in silence. The finance officer in his army also died under torture during interrogation. Later, another inspector discovered the real culprit and cleared Zhu Ju's name. (Note: See Zhu Ju's article for more details.)

As for Gu Yong, Lü Yi initially prepared to make a case against him for incompetence and ask Sun Quan to remove him from office. However, after an official Xie Gong (謝厷) pointed out that Pan Jun, the Minister of Ceremonies, would most likely become the next Imperial Chancellor if Gu Yong were to be removed from office, Lü Yi immediately dropped the case against Gu Yong because he knew that Pan Jun resented him and would take action against him if he became Imperial Chancellor.

In Diao Jia's case, Lü Yi falsely accused him of defaming the imperial court, resulting in an angry Sun Quan ordering Diao Jia's arrest. During the interrogation, when Diao Jia's colleagues were asked whether they heard him defame the imperial court, they all said they did, because they feared retaliation from Lü Yi if they said no. Only Shi Yi said he did not, and he eventually managed to convince Sun Quan that Diao Jia was innocent. (Note: See Shi Yi's article for more details.)

In Zheng Zhou's case, earlier on he had arrested and executed Lü Yi's retainer(s) for breaking the law, so Lü Yi bore a grudge against him and spoke ill of him in front of Sun Quan. Sun Quan, believing what Lü Yi said, turned furious and summoned Zheng Zhou to meet him. Pan Jun and Chen Biao spoke up for Zheng Zhou and succeeded in convincing Sun Quan to spare him.

== People who spoke up against Lü Yi's abuses of power ==
Pan Jun, having heard of Lü Yi's abuses of power, sought permission to leave his position and return to the imperial capital, Jianye (present-day Nanjing, Jiangsu), for an audience with the emperor Sun Quan. Upon returning to Jianye, he learnt that Sun Deng, the Crown Prince, had already spoken up numerous times about Lü Yi's behaviour, but Sun Quan refused to listen to him. Many other officials, fearing that they would offend Lü Yi by speaking up, remained silent. Pan Jun decided to take matters into his own hands. He pretended to host a banquet, invited all his colleagues to attend, and hoped to use the opportunity to assassinate Lü Yi. However, Lü Yi secretly found out that Pan Jun wanted to kill him, so he lied that he was sick and did not show up.

Apart from Pan Jun and Sun Deng, there were others who stood up to Lü Yi's abuses of power. The senior general Lu Xun, along with Pan Jun, frequently spoke up about Lü Yi's behaviour in front of Sun Quan, to the point of breaking down in tears. Bu Zhi, another high-ranking general, also wrote to Sun Quan on at least four occasions to speak up for Lü Yi's victims, and advise the emperor to rely on capable officials such as Gu Yong, Lu Xun and Pan Jun.

== Downfall ==
Lü Yi's abuses of power finally came to an end in 238 when Sun Quan learnt the truth about him and understood the gravity of the situation. Lü Yi was removed from office and imprisoned under the watch of the Ministry of Justice. Sun Quan then put Gu Yong in charge of investigating Lü Yi's crimes. While interrogating Lü Yi, Gu Yong maintained his composure and performed his job professionally. Before Lü Yi was escorted out, Gu Yong asked him, "Do you have anything else to say?" Lü Yi kowtowed and remained silent. When another official Huai Xu (懷叙) started scolding Lü Yi, Gu Yong sternly rebuked him, "As government officials, we should follow the laws. Why must you do this?"

Some officials proposed that Lü Yi be executed by burning or dismemberment – so as to highlight the severity of his crimes – instead of beheading. When Sun Quan sought Kan Ze's opinion on this, the latter replied that burning and dismemberment should be not be used as means of execution in a civilised age. Sun Quan heeded his advice.

== Aftermath of the Lü Yi scandal ==
After the entire scandal was over, Sun Quan sent Yuan Li (袁禮) as his personal representative to meet all his senior generals and make an apology on his behalf. He also tasked Yuan Li with seeking their views on how the system could be reformed and improved. However, to his disappointment, his generals Zhuge Jin, Bu Zhi, Zhu Ran and Lü Dai gave the excuse that they were not in charge of civil affairs and said that civil affairs were best left to civil officials such as Lu Xun and Pan Jun. Sun Quan then wrote an emotional letter to them, blaming himself for the mistakes and urging them to give him honest advice and point out his mistakes.

Throughout the entire scandal, Bu Zhi had written to Sun Quan numerous times to defend those who were wrongly accused and to urge Sun Quan to rehabilitate Lü Yi's victims. Although Sun Quan did not accept every piece of advice, Bu Zhi's efforts ultimately saved many officials from doom.

== See also ==
- Lists of people of the Three Kingdoms
