= Cheng Bing =

3rd century Eastern Wu official

Cheng Bing 程秉
- Born: Family name: Cheng (程); Given name: Bing (秉); Courtesy name: Deshu (德樞); Unknown; Xiangcheng, Henan
- Died: Unknown
- Occupations: Official, writer
- Writing career
- Notable works: Selections from the Book of Changes; Discussions on the Book of History; Guide to the Analects

Cheng Bing (fl. 190s–220s), courtesy name Deshu, was an official and writer of the state of Eastern Wu during the Three Kingdoms period of China.

== Life ==
Cheng Bing was from Nandun County (南頓縣), Runan Commandery (汝南郡), which is located west of present-day Xiangcheng, Henan. He was a student of the Confucian scholar Zheng Xuan. When chaos broke out in China towards the end of the Han dynasty, Cheng Bing left for Jiao Province in southern China. Around this time, he studied with Liu Xi (劉熙) and became well versed in the Five Classics. Shi Xie, the Administrator of Jiaozhi Commandery, appointed him as a Chief Clerk (長史).

Sometime in the early 220s, Sun Quan, the founding emperor of Eastern Wu, heard of Cheng Bing's fame as a learned Confucian scholar so he sent a messenger to Jiao Province to recruit Cheng to serve under him. Cheng Bing agreed and was appointed by Sun Quan as the Crown Prince's Tutor (太子太傅). In 225, Sun Quan arranged a marriage between his heir apparent, Sun Deng, and Zhou Yu's daughter. Cheng Bing was designated as the Minister of Ceremonies (太常) and was in charge of the wedding reception in Wu Commandery (around present-day Suzhou, Jiangsu). Sun Quan boarded Cheng Bing's ship during the ceremony and treated him with the utmost respect. Cheng Bing also guided Sun Deng on the formalities associated with the marriage.

Cheng Bing died in office. No details about his death were recorded in history. Throughout his life, he wrote three major works: Selections from the Book of Changes (周易摘), Discussions on the Book of History (尚書駮), and Guide to the Analects (論語弼).

== See also ==
- Lists of people of the Three Kingdoms
