= Shi Yi =

Shi Yi may refer to:

- Shi Yi (士壹), a younger brother of the Han dynasty warlord Shi Xie
- Shi Yi (Eastern Wu) (是儀), Eastern Wu official of the Three Kingdoms period
- Ten Wings (十翼; Shi Yi), the classical commentaries to the Book of Changes.
- Short for Shi Yi Ji (拾遺記)
