= Lady Zhou (Eastern Wu) =

Eastern Wu noblewoman and daughter of Zhou Yu

- 周妃
- Born: Before 210s
- Died: Unknown
- Burial place: Possibly "Lady Zhou's Tomb," near Jurong County
- Title: Crown Princess of Eastern Wu
- Spouse: Sun Deng
- Parents: Zhou Yu (father); Possibly Xiao Qiao (uncertain) (mother)
- Relatives: Zhou Xun (brother), Zhou Yin (brother)

Lady Zhou (Chinese: 周妃; pinyin: Zhōu Feī; fl.210 - 225) was a noblewoman of Eastern Wu during the Three Kingdoms period. She was the daughter of the general Zhou Yu and the wife of Sun Deng, the crown prince of Eastern Wu. Historical records mention her marriage to Sun Deng in 225 AD, arranged by Sun Quan, the ruler of Wu, as part of a political alliance. It is unclear whether Lady Zhou was the biological daughter of Xiao Qiao, Zhou Yu's wife. Lady Zhou had two brothers, Zhou Xun (周循) and Zhou Yin (周胤). Her name was recorded in a clan genealogy as Zhou Zhe or Zhou Che (周徹), but another genealogy files the name as belonging to Zhou Yu's son instead.

After her marriage, Lady Zhou became crown princess but little is known about her life afterward. Some records suggest she may have died early, as Sun Deng took a second wife later on. She had three stepsons: Sun Fan, Sun Ying, and Sun Xi. Her tomb is believed to be located near Jurong County, although its exact location has been lost over time.

== In historical records ==
=== Early life and marriage ===
Lady Zhou was the daughter of Zhou Yu, a general in services of Sun family. But it is unclear whether Xiao Qiao was the biological mother of Lady Zhou, as historical records do not provide definitive details on this aspect. At the time of Zhou Yu's death in 210 AD, Lady Zhou was still very young and lived in Wu County. In Cheng Bing's biography found in Sanguozhi, the marriage between Lady Zhou and Sun Deng, the crown prince of Wu, is described in detail. In 225 AD, when Sun Deng was 17 years old (by East Asian reckoning), Emperor Sun Quan selected Lady Zhou to become the crown princess. The Minister of Ceremonies, Cheng Bing, presided over the wedding, personally welcoming Lady Zhou in Wu County. Together, they traveled by boat along the river to Wuchang, where the wedding was held. Sun Quan placed great importance on the marriage and personally boarded Cheng Bing’s boat, extending significant honor and respect to the couple.

After the wedding, Cheng Bing offered words of advice to Sun Deng, saying:

"Marriage is the foundation of human relations and the basis of royal education. Ancient wise rulers highly valued marriage and led by example, showing respect for propriety so that the entire kingdom could learn from them. Therefore, the Book of Songs starts with the Guan Ju in the section 'Zhou Nan.' I hope that after your marriage, you will continue to follow the rites and be like the poem says, 'a graceful lady, accompanied by zither and lute.' If you do so, virtue will flourish among the upper classes, and common folk will praise your conduct."

Sun Deng, smiling, replied:

"I will certainly follow the good and avoid evil, carrying out your teachings in full."

=== Later life ===
After the marriage, Lady Zhou got along well with Sun Deng and became good friends with Sun Quan's two daughters, Sun Luban and Sun Luyu. Lady Zhou's brothers, Zhou Xun and Zhou Yin, were also well-regarded and received favor within the imperial court. Zhou Xun married Sun Luban, the daughter of Sun Quan, making Lady Zhou and the later politically influential Sun Luban sisters-in-law.

According to a note in Wu Shu, quoted in the biography of Pan Jun (Annotated Records of the Three Kingdoms, annotated by Pei Songzhi), Sun Quan had originally selected Rui Xuan’s daughter as a potential bride for Sun Deng, suggesting that Lady Zhou may have died early, allowing another woman to become Sun Deng’s wife.

There is also a theory that Lady Zhou’s name might have been Zhou Zhe, but some family records indicate that Zhou Zhe was actually the name of Zhou Yu’s son. Additionally, there is occasional confusion between her family and the family of Zhou Fang, another Wu official.

The historical record does not provide further details about Lady Zhou's later life. Sun Deng had three sons—Sun Fan, Sun Ying, and Sun Xi—but their mother is not mentioned in the historical texts. Sun Deng died early in 241 AD, during the 4th year of the Chiwu era. It is unclear whether Lady Zhou predeceased her husband or survived him.

The historical novel Romance of the Three Kingdoms largely follows the historical accounts of Lady Zhou.

== In folkore ==
There an ancient tomb known during the Qing dynasty as "Lady Zhou’s Grave." This tomb is ancient and located in a remote area, so few people know of it today. It is said to be the burial site of the daughter of Zhou Yu, the great military strategist of Eastern Wu during the Three Kingdoms period. Zhou Yu, who played a pivotal role in the Battle of Red Cliff, defeating Cao Cao’s massive army with a much smaller force of 50,000, was a celebrated figure in the service of Sun Quan. Though well-loved by his lord and respected by his subordinates, Zhou Yu had one regret in life—he had no daughter, only two talented sons.

Tales has it that the heavens took notice, and after much yearning, Zhou Yu’s wife, Xiao Qiao, gave birth to a daughter in the spring following a long winter. Zhou Yu was overjoyed at the birth of his beloved daughter and cherished her like a precious gem. However, Zhou Yu soon met his fate on the battlefield, struck by a poisoned arrow. Knowing his time was limited and that he would not live to raise his daughter, he carefully chose what to leave behind for her.

The saying "A slight error in music, and Zhou Lang turns his head" refers to Zhou Yu’s legendary skill in music. In his final moments, Zhou Yu decided to leave his cherished daughter a konghou (a type of ancient harp), a symbol of his love and his musical talent, dying soon after.

Xiao Qiao, understanding her husband’s deep affection for their daughter, took great care to raise her as Zhou Yu had wished. As the years passed, Lady Zhou grew to inherit both her mother’s beauty and her father’s talents, particularly excelling in playing the konghou. Sun Quan, aware that she was the daughter of his esteemed general, treated her with great favor. When it came time for the crown prince Sun Deng to marry, Lady Zhou, known for her beauty and talents, was selected as the crown princess.

On the day of the wedding, when Sun Deng lifted the bridal veil, he was captivated by her grace and beauty. Lady Zhou, having heard of the prince’s virtues, shyly smiled in return. Sun Deng had also heard many stories from his father, Sun Quan, about the greatness of Zhou Yu, which deepened his respect for his new wife. The young couple shared a deep bond, their marriage filled with harmony.

Lady Zhou, although young, was deeply concerned for the welfare of the people. She hoped that her husband would one day become a wise and just ruler. As a supportive wife, she often urged Sun Deng to show compassion to the people and be mindful of the land and resources. Sun Deng took her words to heart, even avoiding fertile farmland during his travels. Within the palace, Lady Zhou became close friends with Sun Luban, the eldest princess, and also doted on Sun Luban’s younger sister, Sun Luyu.

When her elder brother died, Lady Zhou privately grieved over her other brother’s lack of ambition. She frequently wrote letters urging him to honor their mother and not disappoint the emperor or the legacy of their father, Zhou Yu.

Lady Zhou’s attentiveness to those around her earned her great admiration throughout the kingdom. People began to hope that one day she would become the empress, a symbol of virtue and grace. However, tragedy struck when Lady Zhou fell gravely ill. Even in her final days, she worried about her husband, sisters, and the people. She distributed her personal treasures to her close friends and left the konghou to Princess Sun Luyu, as part of her dowry for her future marriage.

On the day of her burial in Jurong, the people were heartbroken and gathered in large numbers to bid her farewell. Years later, Sun Deng also died at a young age and was buried in the same place. However, it is said that Sun Deng’s remains were later moved, leaving Lady Zhou’s tomb behind, now known as "Lady Zhou’s Grave." Over the decades, the tomb has disappeared, leaving only a lingering legend behind.

== Bibliography ==
- Records of the Three Kingdoms, Book of Wu, Biography of Zhang, Yan, Cheng, Kan, and Xue, Chapter 8.
- Records of the Three Kingdoms, Book of Wu, Biography of Zhou Yu, Lu Su, and Lü Meng, Chapter 9.
