= Kan Ze =

State of Eastern Wu official (died 243)

- 闞澤

Grand Tutor of the Crown Prince (太子太傅)
- In office 242 – 243
- Monarch: Sun Quan
- Chancellor: Gu Yong

Palace Attendant (侍中)
- In office 238 or before – 243
- Monarch: Sun Quan
- Chancellor: Gu Yong

Prefect of the Palace Writers (中書令)
- In office 232 or after – 238 or before
- Monarch: Sun Quan
- Chancellor: Gu Yong

Master of Writing (尚書)
- In office 229 – 232 or after
- Monarch: Sun Quan
- Chancellor: Gu Yong

Prefect of Chen (郴令)
- In office ?–?

Chief of Qiantang (錢唐長)
- In office ?–?

Personal details
- Born: Unknown Shaoxing, Zhejiang
- Died: 243
- Occupation: Official, scholar
- Courtesy name: Derun (德潤)
- Peerage: Marquis of a Chief District (都鄉侯)

Kan Ze (died November or December 243), courtesy name Derun, was an official of the state of Eastern Wu during the Three Kingdoms period of China.

== Life ==
Kan Ze was from Shanyin County, Kuaiji Commandery, which was located southeast of present-day Shaoxing, Zhejiang. Although he was born in a peasant family, he was studious and had an interest in reading books. He became a well-known scholar specialising in the field of calendar systems. He was nominated as a xiaolian (civil service candidate) to join the civil service and was appointed as the Chief (長) of Qiantang County (錢唐) and Prefect (令) of Chen County (郴縣).

When the warlord Sun Quan was still known as General of Chariots and Cavalry (驃騎將軍), Kan Ze was recruited by him to serve as his West Assistant Officer (西曹掾). After Sun Quan declared himself emperor of Eastern Wu in 229, Kan Ze was appointed as a Master of Writing (尚書). During the Jiahe era of Sun Quan's reign, Kan Ze served as the Prefect of the Palace Writers (中書令) and Palace Attendant (侍中), and was promoted to Grand Tutor of the Crown Prince (太子太傅) in 242. Kan Ze died in the following year and Sun Quan was so grieved that he skipped meals for days.

Kan Ze was known to be polite, modest, sincere and cautious. He treated all minor officials under him with respect. Some of his notable contributions include the annotations he made to the calendar text Qian Xiang Li (乾象曆) by Liu Hong (劉洪) and his promotion of calendar science in Eastern Wu. For his achievements in Confucian studies, he was also granted the title of a minor marquis. Kan Ze strongly opposed the use of torture. When Lü Yi was found guilty of abusing his powers, many officials supported the use of burning or dismemberment as a means of executing him to serve as a warning to potential offenders. When Sun Quan asked Kan Ze for his opinion, Kan Ze replied, "Such punishments should not be used in a civilised age". Sun Quan heeded his advice and had Lü Yi executed by beheading.

== In Romance of the Three Kingdoms ==
Kan Ze appears in the 14th-century historical novel Romance of the Three Kingdoms during the events leading to the Battle of Red Cliffs. He saw through the Self Torture Ruse (苦肉計) used by Huang Gai to trick Cao Cao into believing that his defection was genuine. Kan Ze offered to help Huang Gai deliver his surrender letter to Cao Cao. He disguised himself as a fisherman and went to Cao Cao's camp. Initially, after Cao Cao read Huang Gai's letter, he saw through the plan and ordered Kan Ze to be executed. However, Kan Ze remained calm and broke into laughter, prompting Cao Cao to question him. With his glib tongue, Kan Ze managed to convince Cao Cao that Huang Gai's defection was real. This was critical in ensuring that later Huang Gai's fire attack on Cao Cao's naval fleet would be a success.

In a later chapter, during the Battle of Xiaoting, Liu Bei's forces defeated Sun Huan and pressed on Sun Quan's territory. Kan Ze recommended Lu Xun to be the commander-in-chief of Sun Quan's army, but many officials opposed the idea because they felt that Lu Xun was young and inexperienced. Kan Ze vouched for Lu Xun with the lives of himself and his whole family, claiming that Lu Xun was the best person to lead their army, and Sun Quan agreed. Lu Xun did not disappoint Sun Quan and Kan Ze as he eventually led the Wu forces to victory over Liu Bei in the battle.

== See also ==
- Lists of people of the Three Kingdoms
