= Hu Zong =

Chinese official, general, writer and poet of the Three Kingdoms period (183-243)

- 胡綜

Left Upholder of the Law (左執法)
- In office ? – 243
- Monarch: Sun Quan

Lieutenant-General (偏將軍)
- In office ? – 243
- Monarch: Sun Quan

Right Commandant of the Army (右領軍)
- In office 229 – ?
- Monarch: Sun Quan

Palace Attendant
- In office 229 – ?
- Monarch: Sun Quan

General of the Household Who Establishes Might (建武中郎將)
- In office 223 – 229
- Monarch: Sun Quan

Right Commander of the Jiefan (解煩右部督)
- In office 221 – 223
- Monarch: Sun Quan

Personal details
- Born: 183 (Note: Hu Zong's biography in the Sanguozhi recorded that he was 14 (by East Asian age reckoning) when Sun Ce became the Administrator of Kuaiji Commandery in 196. By calculation, Hu Zong was born in 183. Hu Zong's biography also recorded that he died in the 6th year of the Chiwu era (238–251) of Sun Quan's reign. Since he was born in 183, he was probably about 60 years old when he died in 243.) Gushi County, Henan
- Died: 243 (aged 60)
- Children: Hu Chong
- Occupation: Military general, poet, politician
- Courtesy name: Weize (偉則)
- Peerage: Marquis of a Chief District (都鄉侯)

Hu Zong (183–243), courtesy name Weize, was a Chinese military general, poet, politician of the state of Eastern Wu in the Three Kingdoms period of China.

== Early life ==
Hu Zong was from Gushi County, Runan Commandery (汝南郡), which is in present-day Henan. He lost his father at a young age. When chaos broke out in central China towards the end of the Eastern Han dynasty, Hu Zong and his mother fled south across the Yangtze to take shelter in the Jiangdong region.

In 196, after the warlord Sun Ce appointed himself as the Administrator of Kuaiji Commandery, he recruited a 13-year-old Hu Zong as a household attendant and ordered him to remain in Wu Commandery (around present-day Suzhou, Jiangsu) and serve as a reading mate to his younger brother, Sun Quan.

== Service under Sun Quan in the Eastern Han dynasty ==
Following Sun Ce's death in the year 200, Sun Quan succeeded him as the warlord ruling over the Jiangdong territories. After receiving the nominal appointment of General Who Attacks Barbarians (討虜將軍) from the Han central government, Sun Quan appointed Hu Zong as a staff officer in charge of finances.

In 208, Hu Zong accompanied Sun Quan on a campaign against Huang Zu, a general under a rival warlord Liu Biao. After defeating Huang Zu and conquering Jiangxia Commandery (江夏郡; around present-day Wuhan, Hubei), Sun Quan appointed Hu Zong as the Chief of E County (鄂縣; present-day Ezhou, Hubei).

Around early 210, after Sun Quan was appointed General of Chariots and Cavalry (車騎將軍) by the Han central government, he designated Jing (京; present-day Zhenjiang, Jiangsu) as the capital of his territories and recalled Hu Zong back from E County to serve in Jing. Along with Shi Yi and Xu Xiang (徐詳), (Note: Xu Xiang (徐詳), whose courtesy name was Ziming (子明), was from Wucheng County, Wu Commandery, which is in present-day Huzhou, Zhejiang. He died before Hu Zong.) Hu Zong was privy to classified information as they were in charge of Sun Quan's secretariat.

== Service in Eastern Wu ==
=== Sun Quan becoming the King of Wu ===
On 23 September 221, Sun Quan pledged allegiance to Cao Pi, who usurped the throne from the last Han emperor and established the state of Wei to replace the Eastern Han dynasty. In return, Cao Pi awarded Sun Quan the title of a vassal king, "King of Wu" (吳王). After his coronation, Sun Quan enfeoffed Hu Zong, Shi Yi and Xu Xiang (徐詳) as village marquises.

In November 222, although Sun Quan broke ties with Cao Pi and proclaimed himself the independent ruler of his Eastern Wu state by adopting "Huangwu" (黃武) as the era name of his reign. However, he did not declare himself emperor yet and continued to rule under the title "King of Wu".

=== Creation of the Jiefan Corps ===
Just before the Battle of Xiaoting of 221–222, Sun Quan saw that he had too few troops so he ordered Hu Zong to draft men from the various counties into military service. Hu Zong managed to recruit about 6,000 men, who were organised into the two-section Jiefan Corps (解煩兵). Hu Zong and Xu Xiang (徐詳) served as the commanders of the Right and Left sections respectively.

=== Battle of Qichun ===
Jin Zong (晉宗), a Wu military officer, defected to Wei and was appointed as the administrator of the Wei outpost at Qichun. During this time, Jin Zong frequently led Wei forces to raid the Wu border along the Yangtze. In 223, Sun Quan ordered Hu Zong to join the Wu general He Qi and others in leading a group of lightly armed troops to launch a surprise attack on Qichun. Their attack was a success and they managed to capture Jin Zong alive. Hu Zong was then promoted to General of the Household Who Establishes Might (建武中郎將) for his achievement.

=== Sun Quan declaring himself emperor ===
On 23 May 229, after there were reported sightings of the Yellow Dragon at Xiakou (夏口; in present-day Wuhan, Hubei), Sun Quan saw it as a sign that he should declare himself emperor so he did so and changed the era name from "Huangwu" to "Huanglong" (黃龍; literally "Yellow Dragon"). He also created a large banner adorned with the image of the Yellow Dragon and used that as his war flag to direct troop movements in battle. He then ordered Hu Zong to compose a fu to celebrate his ascension to the throne.

When Wu's ally state Shu learnt that Sun Quan had declared himself emperor, they sent an emissary to congratulate him and reaffirm the Wu–Shu alliance against Wei. Under Sun Quan's instruction, Hu Zong produced an elegantly-written oath of covenant for the Wu–Shu alliance.

In October 229, after Sun Quan relocated the Wu imperial capital from Wuchang (武昌; present-day Ezhou, Hubei) to Jianye (present-day Nanjing, Jiangsu), he appointed Hu Zong and Xu Xiang as Palace Attendants and as the Right and Left Commandants of the Army (左右領軍) respectively. He also increased the rank of their peerages from village marquis (亭侯) to district marquis (鄉侯).

=== Sowing discord between Wu Zhi and the Wei government ===
When defectors from Wei reported that the Wei government had suspicions about the loyalty of the Wei general Wu Zhi, Hu Zong decided to use the opportunity to sow greater discord between Wu Zhi and the Wei government. He wrote a three-point letter, falsely attributed it to Wu Zhi, and spread copies of it in Wei territories in the hope of making the Wei government think that Wu Zhi was planning to defect to Wu. However, by the time the letter was widely circulated in Wei, the Wei government had already reassigned Wu Zhi to serve as Palace Attendant in the Wei imperial capital.

=== Yin Fan incident ===
In 230, after the Wei official Yin Fan (隱蕃) submitted a letter indicating his wish to defect to Wu, Sun Quan interviewed him and felt impressed when Yin Fan analysed current affairs well and provided eloquent responses to his questions. Hu Zong was also present when Sun Quan interviewed Yin Fan, so Sun Quan asked him for his opinion. Hu Zong replied: "Yin Fan's defection letter may resemble the writing style of Dongfang Shuo and his speaking skills may resemble those of Mi Heng, but he isn't as talented as them."

When Sun Quan asked Hu Zong what job was suitable for Yin Fan, Hu Zong said: "He isn't capable of governing the people. We can try giving him a low-level position in the Imperial Capital." Sun Quan considered that Yin Fan seemed knowledgeable about criminal law so he appointed him as a judicial officer. When Yin Fan was serving in Wu, the general Zhu Ju and justice minister Hao Pu (郝普) told Sun Quan that he was capable of holding greater responsibilities. Hao Pu, in particular, got along very well with Yin Fan and often complained that Yin Fan's talent was not put to good use.

In late 230, it turned out that Yin Fan was actually a spy planted in Wu by the Wei emperor Cao Rui, who wanted him to become Wu's justice minister and use his powers to stir up internal conflict in Wu. Yin Fan had, in fact, been plotting against Sun Quan. He was arrested and executed after his plot was uncovered. Sun Quan blamed Hao Pu for Yin Fan's betrayal and forced him to commit suicide; Zhu Ju, who also sang praises of Yin Fan, was implicated in the case and imprisoned for a long time.

=== Later life and death ===
Hu Zong was later promoted to Lieutenant-General (偏將軍) and appointed as Left Upholder of the Law (左執法). Since Sun Quan first took control of the Jiangdong territories in the year 200, Hu Zong had effectively served as Sun Quan's essayist-laureate as he drafted all the important official, legal and diplomatic documents for Wu.

When the Wu regime was first established, the government was so overwhelmed by its workload that it had to enact special laws to prevent officials from leaving their posts without approval, even when they needed to perform filial mourning. However, there were still many officials who disregarded the laws. Sun Quan felt that this issue was a cause for concern so he held a discussion with his subjects on how to deal with such offenders. Hu Zong suggested that they make it a capital offence for officials to leave their posts without approval; only the offender would be punished. After this new law was enacted, the Wu government no longer faced the problem of officials leaving their posts without approval, even when they had to perform filial mourning.

In 233, the Liaodong-based warlord Gongsun Yuan pledged allegiance to Sun Quan and expressed willingness to become a vassal of Wu. Sun Quan was delighted as he saw Gongsun Yuan as a potential ally against Wu's rival state, Wei. When Sun Quan wanted to agree to the alliance, his senior adviser Zhang Zhao strongly objected and had a bitter quarrel with him over this issue. (Note: See Zhang Zhao (Eastern Wu)#Quarrel with Sun Quan for details.) With help from Hu Zong and others, Sun Quan managed to resolve his conflict with Zhang Zhao and be on good terms with him again.

Hu Zong was known for being an alcoholic throughout his life. Whenever he got drunk, he became noisy, rowdy and sometimes violent towards his subordinates. Sun Quan appreciated Hu Zong for his talent so he did not reprimand Hu Zong for his behaviour.

Hu Zong died in 243. His son, Hu Chong (胡冲), inherited his peerage as a Marquis of a Chief District (都鄉侯).

== Family ==
Hu Zong's son, Hu Chong (胡冲), was known for his literary talent and peaceful temperament. Like his father, he served as an official in Wu and rose to the position of Prefect of the Palace Writers (中書令) in the late 270s during the reign of Sun Hao, the last Wu emperor. After the fall of Wu, he served as an imperial secretary in the government of the Jin dynasty and was later appointed as the Administrator of Wu Commandery. Hu Chong was also the author of Wu Li, which was cited by Pei Songzhi in his annotations of Records of the Three Kingdoms.

== See also ==
- Lists of people of the Three Kingdoms
