= Lü Dai =

Eastern Wu general and official (161-256)

- 呂岱

Grand Marshal (大司馬)
- In office May or June 252 – 21 October 256
- Monarch: Sun Liang
- Succeeded by: Teng Yin

Senior General-in-Chief (上大將軍)
- In office September or October 246 – 21 May 252
- Monarch: Sun Quan
- Preceded by: Lu Xun

Governor of Jiao Province (交州牧)
- In office 239 – ?
- Monarch: Sun Quan

General Who Guards the South (鎮南將軍)
- In office ? – September or October 246
- Monarch: Sun Quan

General Who Stabilises the South (安南將軍)
- In office ?–?
- Monarch: Sun Quan

Inspector of Jiao Province (交州刺史)
- In office 220 – ?
- Monarch: Sun Quan
- Preceded by: Bu Zhi
- Succeeded by: Dai Liang

Administrator of Luling (廬陵太守)
- In office ? – 220

Personal details
- Born: 161 Taizhou, Jiangsu
- Died: 21 October 256 (aged 95) (Note: Sun Liang's biography in the Sanguozhi recorded that Lü Dai died on the jichou day of the 9th month in the 1st year of the Taiping era of Sun Liang's reign. This date corresponds to 21 October 256 in the Gregorian calendar.)
- Children: Lü Kai (Note: This Lü Kai was not the same person as the better known Lü Kai, who served in Eastern Wu's ally state Shu Han.)
- Occupation: General
- Courtesy name: Dinggong (定公)
- Peerage: Marquis of Panyu (番禺侯)

Lü Dai (161 – 21 October 256), courtesy name Dinggong, was a military general of the state of Eastern Wu during the Three Kingdoms period of China. Born in the late Eastern Han dynasty, Lü Dai started his career as a minor official in his home commandery in present-day Taizhou, Jiangsu before migrating south to the Jiangdong (or Wu) region, where he became an assistant magistrate and later a county chief under the warlord Sun Quan. He rose to prominence after his successes in suppressing some rebellions in Sun Quan's territories. Around the beginning of the Three Kingdoms period, Sun Quan, who later became the founding emperor of Eastern Wu, appointed Lü Dai as the governor of the restive Jiao Province in the south. During his ten-year-long tenure in Jiao Province, Lü Dai quelled a number of revolts, maintained peace in the area, and contacted some foreign kingdoms in Mainland Southeast Asia and made them pay tribute to Eastern Wu. In 231, he was recalled to Wuchang to oversee civil and military affairs in Jing Province (present-day Hubei and Hunan) alongside his colleague Lu Xun. Throughout the 230s, he suppressed a few rebellions in Wu territories. By 240, as he neared the age of 80, he was still in good physical health and competent enough to perform his duties. He rose to the position of Senior General-in-Chief in 246 and later Grand Marshal in 252 during the reign of Sun Quan's successor Sun Liang. He died aged 95 in 256, and was one of the longest-living notable people of the Three Kingdoms period.

== Early career ==
Lü Dai was from Hailing County (海陵縣), Guangling Commandery (廣陵郡), which is in present-day Taizhou, Jiangsu. He started his career in the late Eastern Han dynasty as a low-level bureaucrat in the county and commandery offices. When chaos broke out throughout China in the 180s and 190s, he fled south to the Jiangdong (or Wu) region for shelter.

In the year 200, after Sun Quan became the warlord ruling over the Jiangdong territories, Lü Dai sought a career under him and was appointed as an assistant official in Wu Commandery. During an inspection tour of Wu Commandery, Sun Quan summoned all the county chiefs and assistant officials for a review of every county's stores and legal administration. Lü Dai impressed Sun Quan when he responded well to his questions and showed that everything under his watch was in perfect order. Sun Quan then reassigned him to be a clerk in his personal administrative office, and later appointed him as the Chief of Yuyao County. During his tenure, Lü Dai recruited over 1,000 able-bodied men to serve in Sun Quan's army.

== Pacifying a rebellion in Kuaiji ==
When Lü He (呂合) and Qin Lang (秦狼) led an uprising in the five counties in the east of Kuaiji Commandery (around present-day Shaoxing, Zhejiang), Sun Quan commissioned Lü Dai as a Colonel and ordered him to assist Jiang Qin in dealing with the rebels. Lü Dai and Jiang Qin succeeded in their mission and managed to pacify the five counties and capture the two rebel leaders. Lü Dai was then promoted to General of the Household of Illustrious Trust (昭信中郎將) as a reward for his achievement.

== Aborted mission to Hanzhong ==
In 211, Lü Dai, with Yin Yi (尹異) as his deputy, led 2,000 troops west to lure Zhang Lu, a warlord based in Hanzhong Commandery, into a trap at Hanxing Commandery (漢興郡; around present-day Baoji, Shaanxi). However, Zhang Lu suspected something fishy so he did not respond. Sun Quan then ordered Lü Dai and his men to return to Jiangdong. (Note: Rafe de Crespigny erroneously recorded in A Biographical Dictionary of Later Han to the Three Kingdoms 23-220 AD that Lü Dai was there to seek an alliance with Zhang Lu.)

On the journey back, Lü Dai passed by Baidicheng (in present-day Fengjie County, Chongqing) and met Sun Quan's ally Liu Bei, who was leading an army to seize control of Yi Province (covering present-day Sichuan and Chongqing) from its governor Liu Zhang. He saw that Liu Bei's army was in disarray and about half of his troops either deserted or were dead, and felt convinced that Liu Bei would not succeed in conquering Yi Province. After returning to Jiangdong, he told Sun Quan, who in turn asked his adviser Wu Fan (吳範), who had previously predicted that Liu Bei would conquer Yi Province. Wu Fan replied: "My prediction is based on Heaven's will. What Lü Dai saw were the actions of people." Wu Fan's prediction came true as Liu Bei did eventually conquer Yi Province by 214.

== Role in the Sun–Liu territorial dispute ==
In 215, when Sun Quan had a territorial dispute with his ally Liu Bei in Jing Province (covering present-day Hubei and Hunan), he ordered Lü Dai, with Sun Mao (孫茂) and nine other officers as his deputies, to lead troops to seize control of the three commanderies of Changsha, Lingling (零陵; around present-day Yongzhou, Hunan) and Guiyang (桂陽; around present-day Chenzhou, Hunan). The officials in four counties – Ancheng, You, Yongxin and Chaling – moved to Yinshan County (陰山縣; southeast of present-day Hengdong County, Hunan), where they declared hostility towards Lü Dai. In response, Lü Dai led his troops to besiege and attack Yinshan County, and succeeded in forcing the rebellious officials to surrender. The three commanderies in southern Jing Province thus came firmly under Sun Quan's control.

Sun Quan left Lü Dai in charge of Changsha. Around the time, Wu Dang (吳碭), the Chief of Ancheng County, conspired with a military officer Yuan Long (袁龍) to rebel against Sun Quan and defect to Guan Yu, the general guarding Liu Bei's territories in southern Jing Province. Wu Dang managed to occupy You County while Yuan Long stationed himself at Liling County. Sun Quan sent his general Lu Su to attack Wu Dang; Lu Su succeeded in defeating Wu Dang and recapturing the counties while Wu Dang fled after his defeat. In the meantime, Lü Dai attacked Liling County and succeeded in capturing and executing Yuan Long. He was then assigned to serve as the Administrator of Luling Commandery (廬陵郡; around present-day Ji'an, Jiangxi).

== As the governor of Jiao Province ==
In 220, Lü Dai was appointed as the Inspector (刺史) of the southern Jiao Province (covering present-day Guangdong, Guangxi and parts of northern Vietnam) to replace Bu Zhi. After Lü Dai assumed office, Qian Bo (錢愽), a bandit chief from Gaoliang Commandery (高涼郡; around present-day Yangjiang, Guangdong) led his followers to surrender to him. Lü Dai accepted Qian Bo's surrender and appointed him as the Commandant of the West Section of Gaoliang Commandery. Later, he also quelled an uprising by indigenous tribes in Yulin Commandery (鬱林郡; around present-day Guigang, Guangxi).

Around the time, there was a bandit chief Wang Jin (王金) from Zhenyang County (湞陽縣; east of present-day Yingde, Guangdong) who frequently led his followers to raid the borders of Nanhai Commandery (南海郡; around present-day Guangzhou, Guangdong). Under orders from Sun Quan, Lü Dai led his troops to attack the bandits and succeeded in capturing Wang Jin alive. He then sent Wang Jin as a captive to the Wu imperial capital, Jianye (present-day Nanjing, Jiangsu). Throughout the campaign, he had killed, captured and released about 10,000 bandits in total. In recognition of Lü Dai's efforts, Sun Quan promoted him to General Who Stabilises the South (安南將軍), granted him acting imperial authority, and enfeoffed him as a Marquis of a Chief District (都鄉侯).

=== Suppressing Shi Hui's rebellion ===
When Shi Xie, the Administrator of Jiaozhi Commandery, died in 226, Sun Quan commissioned Shi Xie's third son, Shi Hui (士徽), as a general and appointed him as the Administrator of Jiuzhen Commandery (九真郡; around present-day Thanh Hóa, Vietnam). He also appointed Chen Shi (陳時) as the new Administrator of Jiaozhi Commandery to succeed Shi Xie. Around the time, Sun Quan wanted to split Jiao Province and create another province, Guang Province (廣州): Jiaozhi, Jiuzhen (九真) and Rinan (日南) commanderies would remain part of Jiao Province; Cangwu (蒼梧), Nanhai (南海), Yulin (鬱林) and Hepu (合浦) commanderies would form the new Guang Province. He then appointed Dai Liang (戴良) and Lü Dai as the Inspectors of Jiao and Guang provinces respectively.

When Dai Liang and Chen Shi came to assume their new appointments, Shi Hui refused to accept the new arrangement and he started a rebellion by sending his forces to block Dai Liang and Chen Shi. After obtaining approval from Sun Quan, Lü Dai led 3,000 troops to attack Shi Hui and quell the rebellion. When someone warned Lü Dai to be careful because the Shi clan had lived in Jiao Province for generations and had strong support from the locals, Lü Dai replied: "Although Shi Hui has decided to rebel, he doesn't expect me to show up with an army. If I launch a swift attack now, I can catch him off guard and defeat him easily. If I don't act fast, the others will start thinking of rebelling too, while Shi Hui will have more time to strengthen his defences. If the barbarians in all the seven commanderies combine forces and join him in his rebellion, I don't think even the most brilliant military commanders can deal with them."

Lü Dai then led his troops to the rendezvous point at Hepu County, where he combined forces with Dai Liang and prepared to attack Shi Hui. When Shi Hui learnt that Lü Dai had shown up at Jiaozhi Commandery with an army, he was so shocked and terrified that he did not know what to do as he did not expect Lü Dai to arrive so quickly. He had no choice but to lead his brothers out of the city and surrender to Lü Dai. Lü Dai later executed all the Shi brothers and sent their heads to Sun Quan. (Note: Shi Xie's biography in Sanguozhi recorded a different account of how the Shi brothers died: it indicated that Lü Dai was both a mentor and friend to Shi Yi's son Shi Kuang. Lü then used this to convince Shi Kuang and persuade Kuang to in turn persuade Shi Hui to surrender; Lü also promised that the Shis would only lose their titles and nothing else. The Shi brothers then surrendered by stripping their upper garments in a show of submission (肉袒). Lü had accepted this surrender-cum-submission. At a gathering the following day, Lü waited until the Shi brothers and all other guests had arrived, before standing up to read an edict containing the Shi brothers' crimes. The Shi brothers were then bound and executed, and their heads sent to Wuchang.) (Note: It is possible that both accounts of how the Shi brothers died were true, i.e. Lü Dai speedily arrived at Jiaozhi Commandery with an army and convinced the Shi brothers to surrender with false assurances. When annotating Shi Xie's biography in Sanguozhi, Pei Songzhi cited Sun Sheng, who criticized Lü Dai for executing the Shi brothers for his advancement and profit, when Lü had been a mentor and friend to Shi Kuang and the Shi brothers had surrendered by stripping their upper garments in a show of submission (肉袒); this submission was how they were captured in a subsequent gathering. Sun Sheng also noted that this event made it clear to junzis that Sun Quan could not think long-term, while the Lü clan's fortunes could not last long. Vol.70 of Zizhi Tongjian recorded an edited amalgamation of the two accounts and an edited version of Sun Sheng's commentary. In his annotations to Tongjian, Hu Sanxing commented that Sun Sheng's comment on the Lü clan's fortunes was referring to the fact that Lü Dai's descendants faded into obscurity (吕岱子孙无闻).) Gan Li (甘醴) and Huan Zhi (桓治), two military officers who used to serve under Shi Hui, rallied their forces to attack Lü Dai to avenge their master. Lü Dai managed to defeat them and eliminate all remaining opposing forces. As a reward for his achievement, Lü Dai was promoted from a district marquis to a county marquis under the title "Marquis of Panyu" (番禺侯).

After Shi Hui's rebellion, Sun Quan abolished the newly created Guang Province and restored the original Jiao Province. After pacifying Jiaozhi Commandery, Lü Dai led his troops further south into Jiuzhen Commandery to attack opposing forces, and killed or captured tens of thousands of enemies. He also tasked the officials under him with spreading Han Chinese culture in the southern lands with the aim of sinicising the non-Han Chinese peoples living there. At the same time, he sent emissaries to contact the rulers of foreign kingdoms such as Funan, Lâm Ấp and Tangming (堂明) in Mainland Southeast Asia, and make them pay tribute to Wu. Sun Quan lauded Lü Dai for his efforts and promoted him to General Who Guards the South (鎮南將軍).

== Pacifying rebellions in Wuling, Luling, Kuaiji and Nanhai ==
In early 231, after seeing that Jiao Province was peaceful, Sun Quan reassigned Lü Dai to a new post at Oukou (漚口; in present-day Changsha, Hunan).

Around March or April 231, when the indigenous tribes living in Wuxi (五谿; literally "five streams"; referring to an area around present-day Huaihua, Hunan) rebelled against Wu rule, Sun Quan ordered Lü Dai to lead 50,000 troops to suppress the rebellion. He also ordered Pan Jun to supervise and assist Lü Dai as the latter conducted the military operation against the rebels. Pan Jun ensured that promises were kept, and rewards and punishments were given out fairly. By December 234, the rebellion ended with over 10,000 rebels killed or taken captive. The indigenous tribes also became so drastically weakened that they could not rebel again in a long time.

In 233, Sun Quan ordered Lü Dai and Pan Zhang to lead their troops to station at Lukou (陸口; at Lushui Lake near present-day Chibi, Hubei). Later, he instructed them to relocate their garrison to the nearby Puqi (蒲圻; present-day Chibi, Hubei).

In 235, rebellions broke out almost simultaneously in three commanderies: Luling (廬陵; around present-day Ji'an, Jiangxi), eastern Kuaiji (around present-day Shaoxing, Zhejiang) and Nanhai (南海; around present-day Guangzhou, Guangdong). Li Huan (李桓) and Lu He (路合) led the rebels in Luling; Sui Chun (隨春) led the rebels in eastern Kuaiji; and Luo Li (羅厲) led the rebels in Nanhai. In response, Sun Quan ordered Lü Dai, with Liu Zuan (劉纂) and Tang Zi as his deputies, to lead troops to separately quell each rebellion. After Sui Chun surrendered, Lü Dai appointed him as a Lieutenant-General and recruited him as a subordinate. He also defeated the other rebel forces, executed the rebel leaders Li Huan, Lu He and Luo Li, and sent their heads to Sun Quan. Sun Quan issued an imperial decree to praise Lü Dai for his achievements in quelling the rebellions and restoring peace in the three commanderies.

Following Pan Jun's death in 239, Lü Dai succeeded him by overseeing all civil and documentation-related affairs in Jing Province. He also moved to Wuchang (武昌; present-day Ezhou, Hubei) to work alongside Lu Xun, but continued to remain in charge of the garrison at Puqi (蒲圻; present-day Chibi, Hubei).

== Quelling Liao Shi's rebellion ==
In December 239 or January 240, a Wu officer Liao Shi (廖式) started a rebellion in Linhe Commandery (臨賀郡; around present-day Hezhou, Guangxi) and led his followers to attack the neighbouring commanderies of Lingling (零陵; around present-day Yongzhou, Hunan) and Guiyang (桂陽; around present-day Chenzhou, Hunan). Liao Shi's revolt also inspired the locals in Jiao Province's Cangwu (蒼梧; around present-day Wuzhou, Guangxi) and Yulin (鬱林; around present-day Guigang, Guangxi) commanderies to rebel against Eastern Wu as well.

When Lü Dai received news of the rebellions, he immediately assembled his troops and led them to attack the rebels. They even travelled at night in order to reach their destination in the shortest possible time. Sun Quan sent an emissary to catch up with Lü Dai and officially appoint him as the Governor of Jiao Province (交州牧). At the same time, he ordered other officers such as Tang Zi to lead their units to Jiao Province to support Lü Dai. After about a year, Lü Dai succeeded in defeating the rebels and restoring peace in the various commanderies. He also executed the rebel leaders Liao Shi, Fei Yang (費楊) and their followers. After completing his mission, he returned to his previous post at Wuchang (武昌; present-day Ezhou, Hubei).

== Overseeing affairs in Wuchang ==
By 240, Lü Dai was already nearing the age of 80, but he was still in good physical health, competent enough to perform his duties as a general, and still personally saw to all the day-to-day affairs in Wuchang (武昌; present-day Ezhou, Hubei).

Around this time, a Wu general Zhang Cheng wrote a letter to Lü Dai as follows: "In the past, when Dan and Shi served as regents of Zhou, people wrote the Odes of the South to praise them. Today, you and Master Lu are just like the two of them. Both of you demonstrate loyalty, diligence, hard work, and humility, make great achievements and contributions, and promote a strong civil culture. Junzis sing praises of your virtues while the people admire you for your values. I heard that every day you have piles of documents to look through and an endless queue of people to meet, yet you neither put aside your work nor complain that you are tired. I even heard that you can get onto horseback without stepping on the stirrups. It looks like you have surpassed Lian Po. How wonderful it is for you to have all these achievements! The Yijing says: 'He wishes his virtue to be more and more complete, and in his intercourse with others to be more and more respectful.' (Note: Quoted from the Xi Ci (I) section of the I Ching. See here for James Legge's translation.) How did you attain such perfection?"

In 243, Lü Dai sent Zhu Ying (朱應) and Kang Tai (康泰) to survey the lands south of Jiao Province in present-day Mainland Southeast Asia and spread Chinese culture there. Kang Tai wrote the Wu Shi Waiguo Zhuan (吳時外國傳), which recorded what he saw during his travels in Mainland Southeast Asia. (Note: The book, while extant during the Tang to Song dynasties, was later lost and only excerpts have survived.)

Following Lu Xun's death in 245, Zhuge Ke replaced him as the military commander guarding Wuchang and overseeing affairs in Jing Province. Sun Quan then divided Wuchang into two sections and put Lü Dai in charge of the right section, which oversaw the area from Puqi (蒲圻; present-day Chibi, Hubei) to Wuchang. In September or October 246, he promoted Lü Dai to Senior General-in-Chief (大將軍), and commissioned Lü Dai's son Lü Kai (呂凱) as a Colonel to oversee the military garrison at Puqi.

== Later career and death ==
After Sun Quan died in May 252, his youngest son Sun Liang became the next emperor of Wu. Later in May or June that year, Sun Liang appointed Lü Dai as Grand Marshal (大司馬).

Lü Dai died on 21 October 256 at the age of 96 (by East Asian age reckoning). His son, Lü Kai (呂凱), inherited his peerage as the Marquis of Panyu (番禺侯).

Before his death, Lü Dai gave instructions that he wanted to be buried in an undecorated coffin, to be dressed in plain clothes, and have a simple funeral. Lü Kai followed all his instructions faithfully.

== Anecdotes ==
=== Leaving his family in poverty ===
Lü Dai was known for living an honest, frugal and simple life. When he held office in Jiao Province, he did not send any income home for years and caused his family to live in poverty and hunger.

Sun Quan sighed when he heard about it, and he told his subjects: "Lü Dai is thousands of li away from home faithfully performing his duties to the State while his family suffers from poverty and I don't know about it until now. What have you, my close aides and information gatherers, been doing all this while?" He then arranged for a certain amount of money, grain, cloth and silk to be sent to Lü Dai's family every year.

=== Friendship with Xu Yuan ===
Lü Dai was close friends with one Xu Yuan (徐原) from Wu Commandery who was known for being generous and ambitious. Lü Dai saw great potential in Xu Yuan so he often sent him clothing, often discussed current affairs with him, and recommended him for higher positions. Xu Yuan eventually rose through the ranks in the Wu government to the position of an imperial censor.

Xu Yuan was known for being loyal, bold and outspoken. Whenever he saw Lü Dai make a mistake, he would point it out to Lü Dai in private and, at the same time, bring up the issue and discuss it in public. When someone told Lü Dai about it, the latter remarked: "This is why I regard Deyuan (Xu Yuan's courtesy name) so highly."

When Xu Yuan died, Lü Dai cried inconsolably and said: "Deyuan was my best friend. Now that he has passed away, where am I going to find someone who will point out my mistakes to me?" Their contemporaries saw their friendship in a very positive light.

== See also ==
- Lists of people of the Three Kingdoms
