= Sun Lü =

Marquis of Jianchang (213-232)

Sun Lü 孫慮

Marquis of Jianchang (建昌侯)
- Tenure: April or May 228 – February or March 232
- Born: 213 (Note: The Sanguozhi mentioned that Sun Lü was 20 years old (by East Asian age reckoning) when he died in February 232. By calculation, his birth year should be around 213.)
- Died: February or March 232 (aged 19)
- Spouse: Lady Pan
Names
- Family name: Sun (孫); Given name: Lü (慮); Courtesy name: Zizhi (子智)
- House: House of Sun
- Father: Sun Quan

Sun Lü (213 – February or March 232), courtesy name Zizhi, was a noble and military general of the state of Eastern Wu in the Three Kingdoms period of China. He was the second son of Sun Quan, the founding emperor of Eastern Wu.

== Life ==
Sun Lü was the second son of Sun Quan, a warlord who lived in the late Eastern Han dynasty and became the founding emperor of the Eastern Wu state in the Three Kingdoms period. As a child, he was intelligent and multi-talented, so his father was particularly fond of him. In April or May 228, a 15-year-old Sun Lü was enfeoffed as the Marquis of Jianchang (建昌侯), with his marquisate in Jianchang County (建昌縣; west of present-day Fengxin County, Jianchang). He married Pan Jun's daughter.

In 229, after Sun Quan declared himself emperor and moved the imperial capital to Jianye (present-day Nanjing, Jiangsu), he left behind his eldest son and heir apparent, Sun Deng, along with his other sons and relatives in Wuchang (武昌; present-day Ezhou, Hubei). At the time, Sun Lü enjoyed watching duck fights, so he had a small shed built in front of the main hall of his residence to stage duck fights. Lu Xun, the general whom Sun Quan left in charge of Wuchang, heard about it and he sternly reprimanded Sun Lü for his behaviour. Lu Xun told Sun Lü, "Marquis, you should be spending time reading the classics and enriching yourself with knowledge. Why are you doing this?" Sun Lü immediately had the shed torn down.

In 230, Gu Yong, the Imperial Chancellor (丞相), wrote a memorial to Sun Quan, pointing out that Sun Lü showed great potential with his brilliance and urging the emperor to elevate Sun Lü to the status of a prince in the same way the Han dynasty emperors did with their sons. Sun Quan refused.

Some time later, the Supervisor of the Masters of Writing (尚書僕射) wrote a memorial to Sun Quan, recommending the emperor to entrust Sun Lü with greater responsibilities by appointing him as a military general. Sun Quan approved, granted Sun Lü imperial authority, and appointed him as Senior General Who Guards the Army (鎮軍大將軍). Sun Lü was also allowed to set up his own office with a personal staff at his headquarters in Banzhou (半州; west of present-day Jiujiang, Jiangxi). Sun Quan also issued an imperial decree to Sun Lü, stating his high hopes and expectations for his second son to become a great military leader. At the time, many people were worried that Sun Lü, given his noble status and young age, might not be suitable for the job. However, Sun Lü not only proved them wrong, but also exceeded their expectations as he took his role seriously, faithfully followed the laws and rules, and treated his colleagues and seniors respectfully.

Sun Lü died in February or March 232 at the age of 20 (by East Asian age reckoning). As he had no son to succeed him when he died, his marquisate was abolished and converted back into a county.

== See also ==
- Lists of people of the Three Kingdoms
- Eastern Wu family trees
