= Shi Yi (Eastern Wu) =

3rd century official of the state of Eastern Wu

- 是儀

Tutor of the Prince of Lu (魯王傅)
- In office 242 – ?
- Monarch: Sun Quan

Supervisor of the Masters of Writing (尚書僕射)
- In office 234 – 242
- Monarch: Sun Quan

Central Upholder of the Law (中執法)
- In office ?–?
- Monarch: Sun Quan

Palace Attendant (侍中)
- In office ?–?
- Monarch: Sun Quan

Lieutenant-General (偏將軍)
- In office ?–?
- Monarch: Sun Quan

Major-General (裨將軍)
- In office 220 – ?
- Monarch: Sun Quan

Colonel of Loyalty and Righteousness (忠義校尉)
- In office 219 – 220

Cavalry Commandant (騎都尉)
- In office c. 211 – 219

Personal details
- Born: Unknown Changle County, Shandong
- Died: Unknown
- Occupation: Official
- Courtesy name: Ziyu (子羽)
- Original name: Shi Yi (氏儀)
- Peerage: Marquis of a Chief District (都鄉侯)

Shi Yi (fl. 190s – 240s), courtesy name Ziyu. After local service that saw him bullied into name change, he fled south during the civil war and became a trusted officer to Sun Quan the future Emperor of Eastern Wu during the Three Kingdoms period of China. A frugal man, he would become a tutor to Princes, diplomat, he rejected military rank and rewards he felt he was undeserving of.

== Life under the Eastern Han dynasty ==
Shi Yi was from Yingling County (營陵縣), Beihai State (北海國), Qing Province, which is located southeast of present-day Changle County, Shandong. He started his career as an assistant official in the county office before progressing in the early 190's to serve on the staff of Kong Rong, the Chancellor of Beihai State. Shi Yi's original family name was Shi (氏) and when Kong Rong heard about it, he made fun of Shi Yi's family name, saying that the character shi (氏) had one stroke less than the character min (民), indicating the common people, so suggested that Shi Yi change his family name to the similar sounding Shi (是) instead. Shi Yi heeded Kong Rong's suggestion. The Eastern Jin dynasty historian Xu Zhong (徐眾), among others, criticised both of them for Shi Yi's changing of his family name and said that it was disrespectful to Shi's ancestors.

Around the mid-190s, when chaos broke out in Qing Province and perhaps after 193 when Kong Rong was driven away by Yuan Tan, Shi Yi travelled south to the Jiangdong region, where he took shelter under Liu Yao, the Governor of Yang Province. After Liu Yao was defeated by the warlord Sun Ce in 195, Shi Yi left him and settled down in Kuaiji Commandery (around present-day Shaoxing, Zhejiang). In the year 200, after Sun Ce's death, his younger brother Sun Quan succeeded him and became the new warlord ruling over the Jiangdong territories. Around this time, Sun Quan sent Shi Yi an elegantly written letter, asking Shi Yi to join him. Shi Yi agreed and joined Sun Quan's staff, increasingly gaining trust with classified documents and around 211 became a Cavalry Commandant (騎都尉).

In 219, when Sun Quan's general Lü Meng proposed a plan to defeat Liu Bei's officer Guan Yu and seize control of southern Jing Province, Sun Quan sought Shi Yi's opinion. Shi Yi agreed with Lü Meng's plan so Shi Yi was made Colonel of Loyalty and Righteousness (忠義校尉) and ordered to accompany Lü Meng on the campaign. When Shi Yi protested at appointment due to lack of experience, Sun Quan said, "I may not be a Viscount Jian of Zhao, but does that mean you can't be a Zhou She?" (Note: Viscount Jian of Zhao (趙簡子) was a patriarch of the Zhao clan in the Jin state during the Spring and Autumn period. His descendants later became the rulers of the Zhao state in the Warring States period. Zhou She (周舍) was an official serving under the Viscount. He was known for being very outspoken and frank.)

== Life in Eastern Wu during the Three Kingdoms period ==
After the successful conquest of southern Jing Province, Sun Quan relocated the capital of his territories to Wuchang (武昌; present-day Ezhou, Hubei), which was in southern Jing Province. In the same year, Sun Quan pledged nominal allegiance to Cao Pi, the emperor of the Cao Wei state, which had replaced the Eastern Han dynasty. In return, Cao Pi made Sun Quan a vassal king under the title "King of (Eastern) Wu" (吳王). Sun Quan then promoted Shi Yi to Major-General (裨將軍), appointed him as a Palace Attendant (侍中) and he shared responsibility for all confidential affairs with Hu Zong and Xiang Xu. When Sun Quan became King, he enoffed his three confidential clerks Hu Zong, Xiang Xu and Shi Yi with the latter made a Marquis of a Chief Village (都亭侯). Later, when Sun Quan wanted to put Shi Yi in command of more troops, Shi Yi firmly declined as he knew that he was not suitable to be a military commander.

In 222, Sun Quan broke ties with Cao Pi and declared independence in his Eastern Wu kingdom. In 228, he sent Shi Yi to Wan County (皖縣; present-day Qianshan County, Anhui) to join the general Liu Shao (劉邵) at Lujiang, luring the Wei general Cao Xiu and his troops into a trap and defeated them. (Note: This battle might be the Battle of Shiting in 228.) After the battle, Sun Quan promoted Shi Yi to Lieutenant-General (偏將軍) and recalled him to Wuchang to serve in the imperial secretariat, one of the key organs of the central government, managing court cases and supervising the officials. Later, he put Shi Yi in charge of his sons' education.

In 229, Sun Quan declared himself emperor of the Eastern Wu state. In October that year, he moved the imperial capital from Wuchang (武昌; present-day Ezhou, Hubei) to Jianye (present-day Nanjing, Jiangsu) and left the crown prince Sun Deng in charge of Wuchang. Shi Yi remained in Wuchang as an adviser to Sun Deng, who highly respected him and frequently consulted him on policy matters. He was also elevated from the status of a village marquis to a Marquis of a Chief District (都鄉侯). Later, he accompanied Sun Deng when Sun Quan summoned them to Jianye, where Shi Yi was appointed as a Palace Attendant (侍中) and Central Upholder of the Law (中執法). Shi Yi served in the imperial secretariat and performed duties similar to those when he was in Wuchang before 229.

Sometime in the 230s, Lü Yi, the supervisor of the audit bureau, falsely accused Diao Jia (刁嘉), the Administrator of Jiangxia Commandery (江夏郡; around present-day Wuhan, Hubei), of defaming the imperial court. Sun Quan was so furious when he heard about it that he had Diao Jia arrested and imprisoned. During the interrogation, when Diao Jia's colleagues were asked whether they heard him defame the imperial court, they all said they did, because they feared retaliation from Lü Yi if they said no. Shi Yi, however, insisted that he did not hear Diao Jia say anything defamatory. As the investigation dragged on for days, the tone of the imperial edicts issued by Sun Quan on this issue became increasingly harsh and stern, to the point where Shi Yi's colleagues feared for his life. Shi Yi remained unfazed and told Sun Quan, "The sword's blade is now on my neck. Why would I dare to conceal the truth, seek my own death, and end up becoming a disloyal ghost? I only hope that everyone will see the truth." When he was questioned, he answered truthfully and gave consistent responses. Sun Quan eventually believed Shi Yi and spared Diao Jia. The Eastern Jin dynasty historian Xu Zhong (徐眾) praised Shi Yi for maintaining his integrity, standing by his moral principles, and showing moral courage in such a life-threatening situation.

In 234, Zhuge Liang, the Imperial Chancellor of Eastern Wu's ally state Shu Han, died of illness during the Battle of Wuzhang Plains against their rival state Cao Wei. In the same year, Sun Quan sent Shi Yi as an emissary to Shu to extend his condolences and reaffirm the Wu–Shu alliance against Wei. Shi Yi performed well on his diplomatic mission. After he returned to Wu, Sun Quan appointed him as Supervisor of the Masters of Writing (尚書僕射).

In 242, Sun Quan designated his third and eldest surviving son, Sun He, as the new crown prince to replace Sun Deng, who died in the previous year. In the same year, he also enfeoffed his fourth son, Sun Ba, as the Prince of Lu. At the time, Shi Yi served as a tutor (傅) to Sun Ba. When he saw that Sun Ba received equal treatment as Sun He, he felt that it was highly inappropriate because according to Confucian rules of propriety, Sun He, as the Crown Prince, should be accorded greater honours and privileges as compared to Sun Ba. He wrote three or four memorials to Sun Quan, recommending the emperor to let Sun Ba assume greater responsibilities and groom him to become an important pillar of the state. (Note: Shi Yi wanted to see Sun Ba become "an important pillar of the state", i.e., an important subject of the emperor, rather than a contender to the throne. However, the situation ultimately did not turn out as he hoped because Sun Ba and Sun He engaged in a power struggle over the succession to their father's throne. See here for more details on the power struggle.) As Sun Ba's tutor, he gave proper advice to the prince and performed his role in a professional manner. At the same time, he also carried out his other duties diligently and treated everyone respectfully.

As Shi Yi became critically ill towards the end of his life, he said that he wanted to have a very simple funeral, to be buried in a coffin of simple design, and to be dressed in the clothes he normally wore. He died in an unknown year at the age of 81 (by East Asian age reckoning).

== Appraisal ==
Shi Yi was known for leading a frugal and humble lifestyle. Unlike many other officials, he did not accumulate wealth for his family and never accepted financial aid from others. He was content with having only basic necessities. Sun Quan once went on a tour of Shi Yi's neighbourhood and saw a large mansion. When he asked who the owner of the mansion was, someone told him it was Shi Yi. However, Sun Quan said that it was definitely not Shi Yi, given his lifestyle. He was proven right. Shi Yi wore very simple clothing and had simple meals every day. He also enjoyed helping the needy so he often donated or gave away his personal savings to the poor. When Sun Quan heard about it, he visited Shi Yi's house and sampled the meals Shi Yi had every day. After the visit, he increased Shi Yi's salary, gave him more rewards and a larger plot of land. However, Shi Yi rejected these rewards and gifts and said that he would feel uneasy if he accepted them.

Throughout his service in the Wu government, Shi Yi was said to have never made a mistake. When Lü Yi, the supervisor of the audit bureau, was looking for flaws in officials' work so that he could maliciously make a case and accuse them of something, he could find at least four problems with the work of every official he accused. (Note: See Lü Yi's article for more details on his abuses of power.) However, when it came to Shi Yi's work, he could not find a single flaw. Sun Quan also once sighed, "If everyone were like Shi Yi, would there still be a need for laws, rules and regulations?"

Whenever Shi Yi recommended talents to Sun Quan, he only pointed out their strengths and said nothing about their weaknesses. Sun Quan thus chided him for not saying anything about their weaknesses and not making judgments about them. In response, Shi Yi said, "Your Majesty, as your subject, my duty is to perform my role well. I am always worried about not being competent in my role. (I keep my opinions about their weaknesses to myself because) I don't want to let my ignorance and limited knowledge affect Your Majesty's judgment about them."

Chen Shou, the historian who wrote Shi Yi's biography, among others, in the Records of the Three Kingdoms, appraised Shi Yi as follows: "Shi Yi was one of the highly capable and competent officials serving under Sun Quan. He was also known for his virtuous and upright moral character."

== See also ==
- Lists of people of the Three Kingdoms
