= Xici =

Xici or Xi Ci (Concerning the Phraseology, simplified Chinese: 系辞; traditional Chinese: 繫辭; pinyin: Xì Cí), a.k.a. (Great Treatise, simplified Chinese: 大传; traditional Chinese: 大傳; pinyin: Dà Zhuàn), is one of the Ten Wings — a collection of Confucian books traditionally included in the I Ching written during the fifth century BCE.

Its origins are unknown, but it is suspected of being the product of scholars who did not believe prevailing Daoist thought. A silk manuscript version of it dating from 168 BCE was found at the Mawangdui site in Changsha in 1973. It's one of the most important sources about early Chinese cosmology. Among the mythologies stressed in the book is that of Fuxi, the emperor-god.
