= Ten Wings =

Classical Chinese commentaries traditionally attributed to Confucius

The Ten Wings (十翼 Shí Yì) is a collection of commentaries (傳 zhuàn) to the classical Chinese Book of Changes (易經 Yìjīng) traditionally ascribed to Confucius, though they were likely composed by later scholars. These writings represent the earliest known interpretations of the 周易 Zhōuyì, the Bronze Age divination manual underlying the Book of Changes (易經 Yìjīng). By offering philosophical and moral insights, the Ten Wings transformed the text from a practical guide for divination into a profound treatise on metaphysics, ethics, and cosmology.

The Ten Wings consist of the following commentaries on the Book of Changes (易經 Yìjīng):

1. 彖傳 Tuàn Zhuàn, Commentary on the Judgments, in two parts:
  • 彖上傳 Tuàn Shàng Zhuàn
2. • 彖下傳 Tuàn Xià Zhuàn
3. 象傳 Xiàng Zhuàn, Description of the Images, in two parts:
  • 象上傳 Xiàng Shàng Zhuàn, first part (sometimes called Greater Xiang or Big Images 大象 Dà Xiàng)
4. • 象下傳 Xiàng Xià Zhuàn, second part (a.k.a. Lesser Xiang or Little Images 小象 Xiǎo Xiàng)
5. 繫辭 Xìcí, Concerning the Phraseology, in two parts:
  • 繫辭上 Xìcí Shàng, first part
6. • 繫辭下 Xìcí Xià, second part
  (the two Xìcí are also called the Great Treatise 大傳 Dà Zhuàn, to emphasize their importance)
7. 文言 Wényán, Discussion of the Words
8. 說卦 Shuōguà, Explanation of the Trigrams
9. 序卦 Xùguà, Sequence of the Hexagrams
10. 雜卦 Záguà, Miscellaneous Notes on the Hexagrams

Doubts concerning Confucius' authorship of the Wings were expressed by Ouyang Xiu (1007-1072) and Sima Guang (1019-1086) during the Northern Song dynasty. They were further consolidated by Yao Jiheng (1647-1715) and Kang Youwei (1858-1927) of the Qing dynasty. The 20th-century sinologists provide argumentation for rejection of the traditional creed.
