= Sun Deng (Eastern Wu) =

Crown Prince of Eastern Wu (209–241)

Sun Deng 孫登

Crown Prince of Eastern Wu
- Tenure: 23 May 229 (Note: This date was also the date whereby Sun Quan crowned himself emperor (bingshen day of the 4th month of the 1st year of the Huang'long era). Previously, when Sun Quan was King of Wu, Sun Deng was also his crown prince; Sun Quan first became King of Wu on 23 September 221 (dingsi day of the 8th month of the 2nd year of Cao Pi's reign, per vol.69 of Zizhi Tongjian).) – May or June 241
- Successor: Sun He
- Born: 209
- Died: May or June 241 (aged 32) (Note: Sun Quan's biography in the Sanguozhi recorded that Sun Deng died in the 5th month of the 4th year of the Chiwu era of Sun Quan's reign. This month corresponds to 28 May to 25 June 241 in the Gregorian calendar.)
- Spouse: Consort Zhou; Lady Bing
- Issue: Sun Fan; Sun Ying, Marquis of Wu; Sun Xi
Names
- Family name: Sun (孫); Given name: Deng (登); Courtesy name: Zigao (子高)
Posthumous name
- Crown Prince Xuan (宣太子)
- House: House of Sun
- Father: Sun Quan

Sun Deng (209 – May or June 241), courtesy name Zigao, posthumous name Crown Prince Xuan, was an imperial prince of the Eastern Wu dynasty during the Three Kingdoms period of China. He was the eldest son of the founding emperor Sun Quan (Emperor Da), and was crown prince from 229 until his death in 241.

== Youth ==
Sun Deng was the eldest son of Sun Quan, the founding emperor of Wu. He was born to a low-status mother and raised from childhood by Lady Xu, the second wife of Sun Quan.

When Cao Pi, emperor of the state of Cao Wei, appointed Sun Quan the King of Wu in 221, he enfeoffed Sun Deng as a marquis with a fief of ten thousand households (万户侯), and offered him the position of East General of the Household (東中郎將). However, Sun Deng refused the title and position, claiming that he was ill. In the same year, Sun Quan designated Sun Deng as the Crown Prince. When Cao Pi demanded that Sun Quan send Sun Deng to the Wei capital Luoyang as a hostage, to guarantee his loyalty, Sun Quan refused and declared independence.

== Life and death ==
It is recorded that Sun Deng was both wise and virtuous, having all the makings of a great man. Sun Quan ordered Zhuge Ke (諸葛恪), Gu Tan (顧譚), Zhang Xiu (張休), Chen Biao (陳表) and others to serve as the Crown Prince's attendants and personal staff. Sun Deng treated his staff kindly. For instance, he allowed others to ride with him and sleep close to him. The Crown Prince's palace was considered to have the largest number of outstanding people in China.

Sun Deng showed his filial piety to both his father and adoptive mother, even through Lady Xu was divorced from Sun Quan in 212. Aged 20, Sun Deng studied the Book of Han under his father's order. When Sun Quan declared himself emperor in 229 and later moved his capital from Wuchang (武昌; in present-day Ezhou, Hubei) to Jianye, Sun Deng and his younger brothers were left in Wuchang. Sun Deng was in charge of the western parts of Eastern Wu with the help of Lu Xun and Shi Yi until his brother Sun Lü died in 232. He then travelled to Jianye to accompany his father and lived there since then.

In 234, Sun Quan personally led a major attack against Wei's border city Hefei. He let Sun Deng remain in the rear. At that time, Sun Deng made some laws to prevent crime, which achieved successful results. However, Sun Deng never succeeded his father, dying from illness aged 33 (by East Asian reckoning). Before he died he wrote a letter to inspire his father and recommend talented individuals. Sun Deng was buried in Jurong, Jiangsu initially, then moved to the Jiang Mausoleum (蔣陵) at the Purple Mountain in Jiangsu. He was posthumously honoured as "Crown Prince Xuan".

== Personal life ==
In 225, on the arrangement of Sun Quan, Sun Deng married Zhou Che, Zhou Yu's daughter. (Note: According to genealogical records (《江西吉安周氏族谱》), Lady Zhou's name was "Che" and she was a younger sister of Zhou Yin (初，胤公妹周彻，配皇太子孙登。).) She thus carried the title of Crown Princess. Sun Deng also had another concubine with the title of shuyuan who was Rui Xuan's (芮玄) daughter. Sun Deng had three children: Sun Fan, Sun Ying (孫英), and Sun Xi. The mother's identity of each is unknown. Both Sun Fan and Sun Xi died at their early age. Thus Sun Ying was enfeoffed as the Marquis of Wu when he grew up. However, Sun Ying was eventually executed because he was accused of attempting to assassinate Sun Jun, the regent who served under the second Wu emperor Sun Liang.

== See also ==
- Lists of people of the Three Kingdoms
- Eastern Wu family trees
