= Sun Quan =

Emperor of Eastern Wu from 229 to 252

Emperor Da of Wu 吳大帝
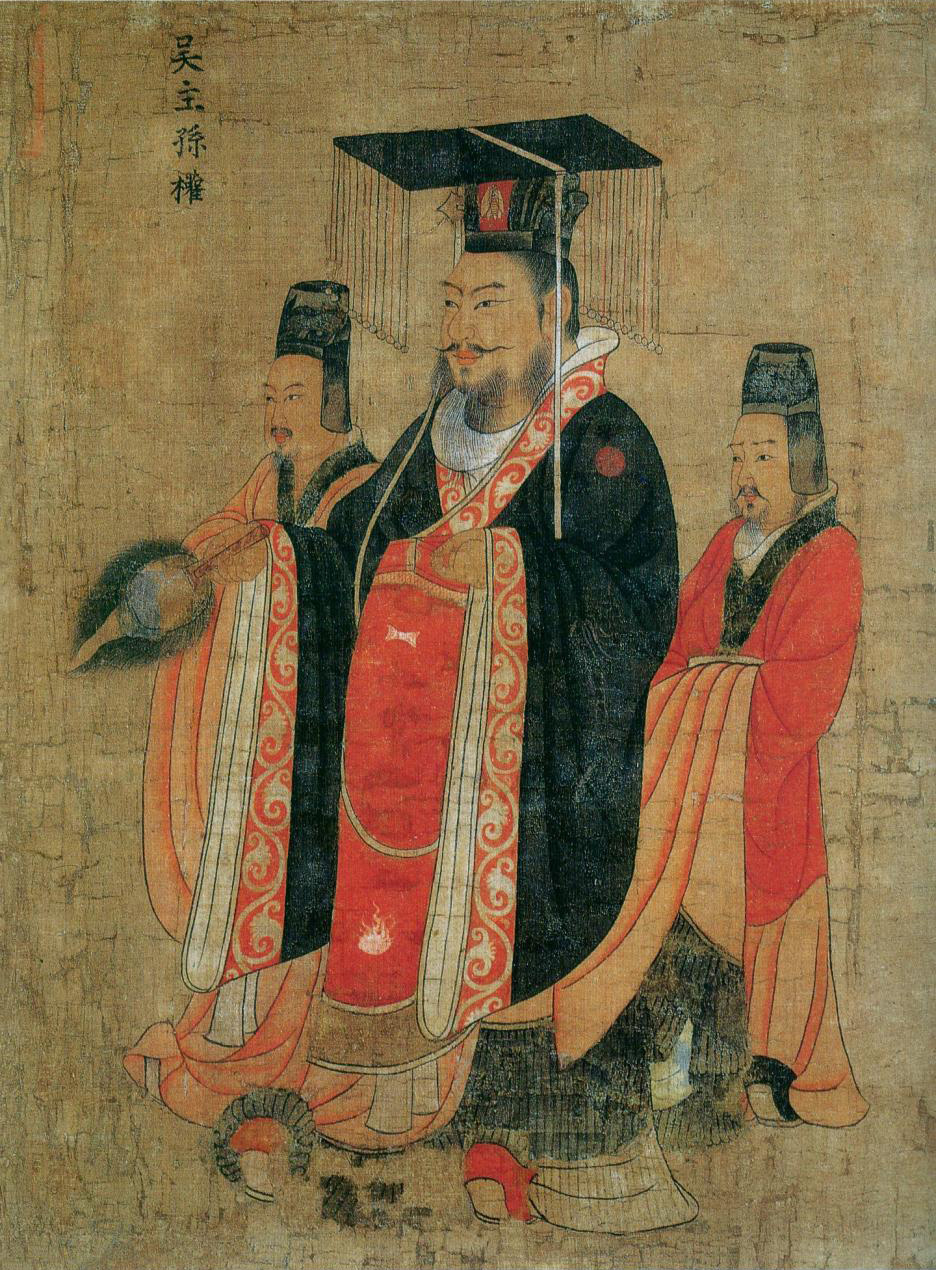
- Tang dynasty portrait of Sun Quan by Yan Liben

Emperor of Eastern Wu
- Reign: 23 May 229 – 21 May 252
- Successor: Sun Liang

King of Wu
- Reign: 23 September 221 (Note: Until November 222 as a vassal of Cao Wei.) – 23 May 229

Marquis of Nanchang (南昌侯)
- Tenure: December 219 – 23 September 221
- Born: 182 AD (Note: The Jiankang Shilu recorded that Sun Quan died on the yiwei day of the 4th month of the 2nd year of the Taiyuan era of his reign; this corresponds to 21 May 252 on the Julian calendar. The Shilu also recorded that he was buried in the 7th month of the same year. He became King of Wu when he was 40 and ruled for 7 years, became Emperor of Wu when he was 47 and ruled for 24 years, and died when he was 70. (His ages are in terms of East Asian age reckoning.) His death date corresponds to 252, while the 7th month of the 2nd year of Taiyuan corresponds to 22 August to 20 September 252 in the Gregorian calendar. As he was 69 when he died in 252, by calculation his year of birth was 182. However, his biography in Sanguozhi indicated that he was 71 (by East Asian reckoning) when he died in the 4th month of the 2nd year of the Taiyuan era.); Han dynasty
- Died: May 21, 252 (aged 69–70); Jianye, Eastern Wu
- Burial: Purple Mountain
- Spouse: Empress Pan; Lady Xie; Lady Xu; Empress Bu; Empress Dayi; Empress Jinghuai; Lady Yuan
- Issue (among others): Sun Deng, Crown Prince Xuan; Sun Lü, Marquis of Jianchang; Sun He, Prince of Nanyang; Sun Ba, Prince of Lu; Sun Fen, Marquis of Zhang'an; Sun Xiu, Prince of Langya; Sun Liang, Marquis of Houguan; Grand Princess Quan; Princess Zhu
Era dates
- Huangwu (黃武; 222–229); Huanglong (黃龍; 229–231); Jiahe (嘉禾; 232–238); Chiwu (赤烏; 238–251); Taiyuan (太元; 251–252); Shenfeng (神鳳; 252)
Posthumous name
- Emperor Da (大皇帝)
Temple name
- Taizu (太祖)
- Dynasty: Eastern Wu
- Father: Sun Jian
- Mother: Empress Wulie

Chinese name
- Traditional Chinese: 孫權
- Simplified Chinese: 孙权
Transcriptions
Standard Mandarin
- Hanyu Pinyin: Sūn Quán
- Gwoyeu Romatzyh: Suen Chyuan
- Wade–Giles: Sun1 Ch'üan2
- IPA: [swə́n tɕʰɥɛ̌n]
Wu
- Suzhounese: Sen Jyœ́
Yue: Cantonese
- Yale Romanization: Syūn Kyùhn
- Jyutping: Syun1 Kyun4
- IPA: [syn˥ kʰyn˩]
Southern Min
- Hokkien POJ: Sun Khoân

Sun Quan (182 – 21 May 252 AD), courtesy name Zhongmou (仲謀), posthumously known as Emperor Da of Wu, was the founder of Eastern Wu, one of the Three Kingdoms of China. He inherited control of the warlord regime established by his elder brother, Sun Ce, in 200 AD. He declared formal independence and ruled from November 222 to May 229 as the King of Wu and from May 229 to May 252 as the Emperor of Wu. Unlike his rivals Cao Cao and Liu Bei, Sun Quan was much younger and governed his state mostly separate of politics and ideology. He is sometimes portrayed as neutral considering he adopted a flexible foreign policy between his two rivals with the goal of pursuing the greatest interests for the country.

Sun Quan was born while his father Sun Jian served as the adjutant of Xiapi County. After Sun Jian's death in the early 190s, he and his family lived at various cities on the lower Yangtze, until Sun Ce carved out a warlord regime in the Jiangdong region, based on his own followers and a number of local clan allegiances. When Sun Ce was assassinated by the retainers of Xu Gong in 200 AD, the 18-year-old Sun Quan inherited the lands southeast of the Yangtze River from his brother. His administration proved to be relatively stable in those early years as Sun Jian and Sun Ce's most senior officers, such as Zhou Yu, Zhang Zhao, Zhang Hong, and Cheng Pu supported the succession. Thus throughout the 200s, Sun Quan, under the tutelage of his able advisers, continued to build up his strength along the Yangtze River. In early 208 AD, his forces finally won complete victory over Huang Zu, a military leader under Liu Biao, who dominated the middle Yangtze. Huang Zu was killed in battle.

In winter of that year, the northern warlord Cao Cao led an army of approximately 220,000 to conquer the south to complete the reunification of China. Two distinct factions emerged at Sun Quan's court on how to handle the situation. One, led by Zhang Zhao, urged surrender whilst the other, led by Zhou Yu and Lu Su, opposed capitulation. Eventually, Sun Quan decided to oppose Cao Cao in the middle Yangtze with his superior riverine forces. Allied with Liu Bei and employing the combined strategies of Zhou Yu and Huang Gai, they defeated Cao Cao decisively at the Battle of Red Cliffs.

In late 220 AD, Cao Pi, King of Wei, Cao Cao's son and successor, seized the throne and proclaimed himself to be the Emperor of China, ending and succeeding the nominal rule of the Han dynasty. At first, Sun Quan nominally served as a Wei vassal with the Wei-created title of King of Wu, but after, Cao Pi demanded that he send his son Sun Deng as a hostage to the Wei capital Luoyang and he refused. In November 222 AD, he declared himself independent by changing his era name. It was not until May 229 AD that he formally declared himself emperor.

After the death of his original crown prince, Sun Deng, two opposing factions supporting different potential successors slowly emerged. When Sun He succeeded Sun Deng as the new crown prince, he was supported by Lu Xun and Zhuge Ke, while his rival Sun Ba was supported by Quan Cong and Bu Zhi and their clans. Over a prolonged internal power struggle, numerous officials were executed, and Sun Quan harshly settled the conflict between the two factions by exiling Sun He and forcing Sun Ba to commit suicide. Sun Quan died in May 252 AD at the age of 70 (by East Asian reckoning). He enjoyed the longest reign among all the founders of the Three Kingdoms and was succeeded by his son, Sun Liang.

The Records of the Three Kingdoms describes Sun Quan as a tall man with bright eyes and oblong face. He was known as a wise and outgoing man who was fond of making jokes and playing tricks. Because of his skill in valuing the strength of his subordinates and avoiding their shortcomings, as well as treating them like his family, Sun Quan was able to delegate authority to capable figures. This primary strength served him well in gaining the support of the common people and surrounding himself with capable generals. Sun Quan possessed great personal charisma, enabling him to command the loyalty of his subordinates.

== Early life and career ==
The Records of the Three Kingdoms mentioned that Sun Jian was a descendant of Sun Wu (better known as Sun Tzu), a militarist in the Spring and Autumn period and the author of The Art of War. Sun Quan was born in 182, while his father Sun Jian was still a low-ranking official of the Han dynasty. He was the second son of Sun Jian and his wife Lady Wu; he had two younger full brothers, Sun Yi and Sun Kuang, and a younger full sister, whose identity is unrecorded.

In 184, two years after Sun Quan was born, the Yellow Turban Rebellion led by Zhang Jue broke out across the country. Sun Jian joined the general Zhu Jun to quell the rebellion and allocated his family to stay in Shouchun. When Sun Quan's elder brother Sun Ce met Zhou Yu in 189, Sun Ce decided to take his mother Lady Wu and younger brothers to Shu County, Zhou Yu's hometown. There, the Sun family became acquainted with Zhou Yu.

After Sun Jian's death in 191, the Sun family moved again to Jiangdu in order to mourn him. Two years later, Sun Ce decided to join Yuan Shu's army so he ordered Lü Fan to take his family members to his maternal uncle Wu Jing's home in Danyang. However, Liu Yao, the Governor (牧) of Yang Province became angry when Sun Ce and Yuan Shu defeated Lu Kang, the administrator of Lujiang in 194. He felt worried that they would attack him further so he drove Wu Jing away from Danyang. Since Sun Quan and his mother were still in Liu Yao's territory, Zhu Zhi sent people to rescue them. Sun Quan and his mother moved to Fuling later.

When Sun Ce defeated Liu Yao in 195, he ordered Chen Bao to bring his family back to Danyang. As Sun Quan grew up, he served his brother during the conquests of the region south of the Yangtze River. He was made Yangxian County magistrate in 196, at the age of 14, and continued to rise through the ranks as his brother gave him more and more important tasks. Since he was passionate about gathering the retainers like Pan Zhang and Zhou Tai, his fame soon approached his father and elder brother. Zhu Ran and Hu Zong, the men he met during his schooldays, later became ministers of Eastern Wu. He was loved by his brother Sun Ce, who said that he would put his men under Sun Quan's management in the future. In 199, Sun Quan was promoted to the rank of Colonel (校尉) and followed his brother to conquer Lujiang and Yuzhang. While Cao Cao attempted to further reinforce the alliance with Sun Ce, both Sun Quan and his younger brother Sun Yi were invited to be officials in Xuchang, but they refused.

== Succeeding Sun Ce ==
In 200, Sun Ce was mortally wounded in an assassination attempt while he was hunting. On his deathbed, he knew that his son was still too young to be considered a realistic heir, so he entrusted the 18-year-old Sun Quan to his faithful subordinates. Initially, Sun Quan mourned his brother's death so much that he couldn't stop crying, but at Zhang Zhao's behest, he dressed himself in military uniform and set out to visit the commanderies under his brother's control. Many of Sun Ce's subordinates thought that Sun Quan was too young to sustain Sun Ce's domain and wanted to leave. Particularly, Li Shu, the Administrator of Lujiang, defected to Cao Cao. Sun Quan wrote a letter to Cao Cao to state Li Shu's crime then headed his troops to defeat Li Shu and regain Lujiang.

Zhang Zhao and Zhou Yu saw special qualities in the young man and chose to stay to serve Sun Quan. Zhang Hong, whom Sun Ce had earlier sent as a liaison to the warlord Cao Cao, also returned from Cao's domain to assist Sun Quan. At Zhang Hong's request, Cao Cao, in the name of Emperor Xian who was controlled by Cao Cao at the time, commissioned Sun Quan as General Who Attacks Barbarians (討虜將軍), a title under which he would be known for a long time. He listened carefully to his mother Lady Wu's encouraging words, and greatly trusted Zhang Zhao and Zhang Hong with regard to civilian affairs and Zhou Yu, Cheng Pu, and Lü Fan with regard to military matters. Sun Quan also sought out talented young men to serve as his personal advisors, and it was around this time that he befriended Lu Su and Zhuge Jin, who would later play prominent roles in his administration. In addition, Lu Xun, Bu Zhi, Gu Yong, Shi Yi, Yan Jun, Xu Sheng and Zhu Huan also became his men. Throughout this period and decades to come, Sun Quan's leadership would be characterised by his ability to find men of character and entrust important matters to him, and his ability to react swiftly to events.

For the next several years, Sun Quan was largely interested in expanding against the Shanyue, hill tribes which controlled the most southern part of China and outside the reach of the Han government, in order to ensure his realm. Sun Quan launched numerous campaigns against the Shanyue. In 206, he conquered the fortress of Shanyue in Matun and Baodun and captured more than 10,000 men. Furthermore, he gradually sought to harass and weaken Liu Biao's key subordinate, Huang Zu (who controlled the northeastern region of Liu Biao's domain) – particularly because Huang Zu had killed his father in battle. He made war on Huang Zu twice in 203 and 207. In 208, he was finally able to defeat and kill Huang Zu in battle, and as a result, he obtained most of the territory of Jiangxia. Soon after, Liu Biao died while Cao Cao was preparing a major campaign to subjugate both Liu Biao and Sun Quan under his control, precipitating a major confrontation.

== Battle of Red Cliffs ==
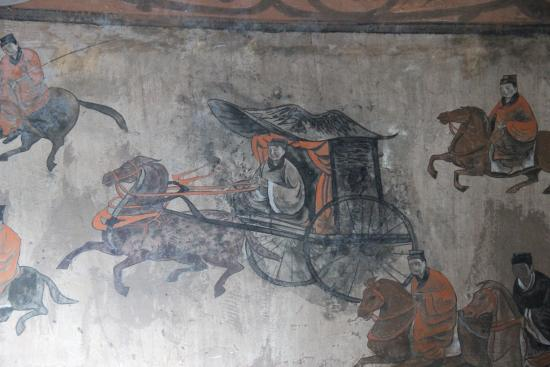
A mural showing chariots and cavalry, from Dahuting Tomb (打虎亭漢墓) of the late Eastern Han dynasty (25-220 AD), located in Zhengzhou, Henan

At the end of 208. After Liu Biao's death, a succession struggle for his domain came into being, between his sons Liu Qi and younger son Liu Cong, whom Liu Biao's second wife Lady Cai favoured (because he had married her niece). After Huang Zu's death, Liu Qi was therefore given Huang's post as the governor of Jiangxia Commandery. Liu Cong therefore succeeded Liu Biao after his death, and Liu Qi was displeased and considered, but did not carry out, an attack against his brother. Nevertheless, Liu Cong, in fear of having to fight Cao Cao and his brother on two fronts, surrendered to Cao Cao against the advice of Liu Biao's key ally Liu Bei. Liu Bei, unwilling to submit to Cao Cao, fled south. Cao caught up to him and crushed his forces, but Liu Bei escaped with his life; he fled to Dangyang. Cao Cao took over most of Jing Province, and appeared set on finally unifying the empire.

Sun Quan was well aware of Cao Cao's intentions, and he quickly entered into an alliance with Liu Bei and Liu Qi to prepare for an attack by Cao. Cao Cao wrote Sun Quan with a letter intending to intimidate, and in face of Cao's overwhelming force (estimated to be about 220,000 men, although Cao claimed 800,000, against Sun's 30,000 and the Lius' combined force of 10,000), many of Sun's subordinates, including Zhang Zhao, advocated surrender. Sun Quan refused, under advice from Zhou Yu and Lu Su that Cao Cao would surely not tolerate him even if he surrendered.

Sun Quan put Zhou Yu in charge of his 30,000 men, largely stationed on naval ships, and Zhou set up a defensive position in conjunction with Liu Bei, whose army was stationed on land. About this time, there was a plague developing in Cao Cao's forces which significantly weakened it. Zhou Yu set up a trap where he pretended to be punishing his subordinate Huang Gai, and Huang pretended to surrender to Cao Cao in fear. Zhou Yu then sent ships under Huang Gai's command to pretend to surrender and, as Huang's ships approached Cao Cao's fleet, they were set aflame to assault Cao's fleet, and Cao's fleet was largely destroyed by fire. Cao Cao led his forces to escape on land, but much of the force was destroyed by Sun Quan and Liu Bei's land forces.

== Uneasy alliance with Liu Bei ==
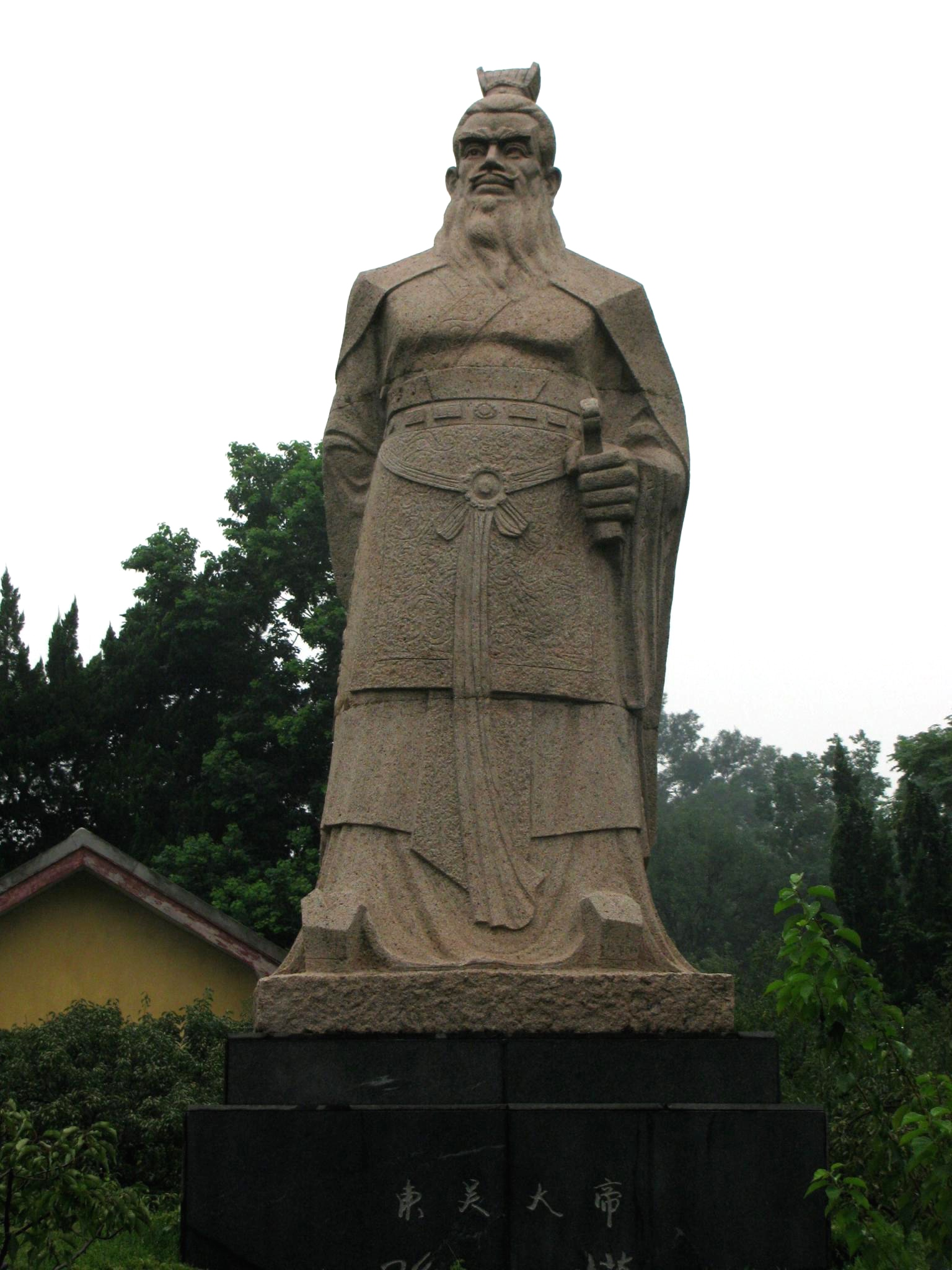
Statue of Sun Quan.

Immediately after Cao Cao withdrew, Sun Quan took over the northern half of Jing Province. Liu Bei marched south and took over the southern half. The Sun-Liu alliance was further cemented by a marriage of Sun Quan's younger sister, Lady Sun, to Liu Bei. Zhou Yu was suspicious of Liu Bei's intentions, however, and suggested to Sun Quan that Liu be seized and put under house arrest (albeit be very well-treated) and his forces be merged into Sun's; Sun Quan, believing that Liu Bei's forces would rebel if he did that, declined. Sun Quan did agree to Zhou Yu's plans to consider attacking Liu Zhang and Zhang Lu (who controlled the modern southern Shaanxi) to try to take over their territories, but after Zhou Yu died in 210, the plans were abandoned. However, Sun Quan was able to persuade the warlords in Jiao Province to submit to him, and they became part of his domain. He then yielded parts of northern Jing Province to Liu Bei as well, agreeing with Liu that the south was insufficient to supply his troops. At the same time, Sun Quan appointed his subordinate Bu Zhi as the Inspector (刺史) of Jiao Province to replace Lai Gong. Shi Xie led his followers to submit to Bu Zhi's governorship. Sun Quan took over the entire Jiao Province.

In 211, Sun Quan moves his headquarters from Dantu to the city of Moling, and in the next year he rebuilt the walls and renamed the city Jianye. This new location gave him better control of the Yangtze River and better communications with his various other commanders. He also constructed fortresses at Ruxu, since Lü Meng anticipated an invasion there from Cao Cao.

The invasion Lü Meng expected came at the start of 213. Sun Quan personally led the army there to resist Cao Cao and relied heavily on the fortresses Lü Meng built to give his soldiers strong positions from which to defend. At one point, Cao Cao tried to send his navy across the river to break Sun Quan's lines, but Sun Quan's own ships surrounded them and destroyed them. Due to the stalemate in the war, Sun Quan drove a big ship to enter the military camp of Cao Cao on the other side of Yangtze River to observe his enemy situation. Cao Cao was very impressed with the military discipline of his opponent so he said that he should have a child like Sun Quan and didn't launch an attack on this occasion. Sun Quan ordered people to play music on the ship and returned to his camp safely. Ultimately, Lü Meng's defences held and Sun Quan wrote a letter to Cao Cao to warn that the spring rains would come a month later, Cao Cao had to take his advice and pull back.

After Cao Cao's defeat at Ruxu, many people along the Yangtze River fled south to join Sun Quan. With the exception of Wan County and the immediate area, the region became abandoned. In 214, Cao Cao sent a man named Zhu Guang to Wan County with orders to revitalise the region and bring it under Cao Cao's control. Zhu Guang began extensive agricultural projects, and he also stirred up bandits and malcontents into rebellion in Sun Quan's territory. Lü Meng feared that if Zhu Guang's programmes were successful, it would make Cao Cao's hold in the area unbreakable and urged for a campaign against Huan. Sun Quan followed Lü Meng's strategy and used the seasonal flooding to travel to the city by boat, which allowed them to attack unexpectedly. Rather than a lengthy siege, Lü Meng, Gan Ning and Ling Tong led a quick strike and broke Zhu Guang's defences, capturing the city.

After Liu Bei's conquest of Yi Province, he was able to supply his troops on his own, so Sun Quan sent Lu Su as an emissary to demand for the return of Jing Province, but Liu Bei refused. Sun Quan then sent Lü Meng and Ling Tong to lead 20,000 men to attack southern Jing Province and they succeeded in capturing Changsha, Guiyang, and Lingling commanderies. Meantime, Lu Su and Gan Ning advanced to Yiyang (益陽) with 10,000 men (to block Guan Yu) and took over command of the army at Lukou (陸口). Liu Bei personally went to Gong'an County and Guan Yu led 30,000 men to Yiyang. When an all-out war was about to break out, the news that Cao Cao planned to attack Hanzhong was received by Liu Bei, and he requested for a border treaty with Sun Quan as he became worried about Cao Cao seizing Hanzhong. Liu Bei asked Sun Quan to give him back Lingling Commandery and create a diversion for Cao Cao by attacking Hefei; in return, Liu Bei ceded Changsha and Guiyang commanderies to Sun Quan, setting the new border along the Xiang River. Sun Quan's attack on Hefei was disastrous - he was nearly captured on one occasion, if not saved by Ling Tong.

In 217, Cao Cao brought a massive army to attack Ruxu again. Sun Quan personally led 70,000 men to defend the city, though he left actual command of the battle to Lü Meng. It was a furious campaign, and after several weeks of gruelling battle, Lü Meng's defences held and the spring floods forced Cao Cao to retreat once again.

Still, this was not a complete victory. Most of Cao Cao's army was still intact and he had a huge force under Xiahou Dun north of Sun Quan's position. This resulted in a stalemate in which as long as Sun Quan kept his army in Ruxu, Xiahou Dun could not hope to invade him; but as soon as Sun Quan pulled out of Ruxu, Xiahou Dun could break through. Also, Xiahou Dun's force was simply too large and too well-entrenched to be driven away. Sun Quan had no military options, so he settled on a diplomatic solution. In 217, Sun Quan allied with Cao Cao, recognising him as the legitimate representative of the Han central government. While officially this was a surrender, Cao Cao knew that Sun Quan would not be content with being treated like a subject, so he confirmed all of the titles Sun Quan had claimed for himself and formalised his control over the lands he held. Sun Quan was permitted to continue to rule independently but was now officially one of Cao Cao's subordinates.

== Breaking of alliance with Liu Bei ==
In 219, Guan Yu advanced north, attacking Fancheng, scoring a major victory over Cao Ren. While Fancheng did not fall at this time, Guan Yu put it under siege, and the situation was severe enough that Cao Cao considered moving the capital away from Xu. However, Sun Quan, resentful of Guan Yu's prior constant instigation of hostilities (including seizing Sun's food supplies to use for his campaign north), took the opportunity to attack Guan from the rear, and Guan's forces collapsed. Guan Yu was captured by forces under Lü Meng and Jiang Qin; Guan Yu was executed, Jing Province came under Sun's control, and the Sun-Liu alliance ended.

After Cao Cao's death in 220, Cao Pi forced Emperor Xian to yield the throne to him, ending the Han dynasty and establishing the state of Cao Wei. Sun Quan did not immediately submit to Wei or declare independence after Cao Pi's enthronement, but took a wait-and-see attitude; by contrast, in early 221, Liu Bei declared himself emperor, establishing the state of Shu Han. Immediately, Liu Bei planned a campaign against Sun Quan to avenge Guan Yu. After attempting to negotiate peace and receiving no positive response from Liu Bei, fearing attack on both sides, Sun Quan became a vassal of Wei. Cao Pi's strategist Liu Ye suggested that Cao Pi decline—and in fact attack Sun Quan on a second front, effectively partitioning Sun's domain with Shu, and then eventually seek to destroy Shu as well. Cao Pi declined, in a fateful choice that most historians believe doomed his empire to ruling only the northern and central China—and this chance would not come again. Indeed, against Liu Ye's advice, on 23 September 221 he appointed Sun Quan the King of Wu and granted him the nine bestowments.

In 222, at the Battle of Xiaoting, Sun Quan's general Lu Xun dealt Liu Bei a major defeat, stopping the Shu offensive. Shu would not again pose a threat to Sun Quan from that point on. Later that year, when Cao Pi demanded that Sun Quan send his crown prince Sun Deng to the Wei capital Luoyang as a hostage (to guarantee his loyalty), Sun Quan refused and declared independence (by changing era name), thus establishing Eastern Wu as an independent state. Cao Pi launched a major attack on Wu, but after Wei defeats in early 223, it became clear that Wu was secure. After Liu Bei's death later that year, Zhuge Jin's brother Zhuge Liang, the regent for Liu Bei's son and successor Liu Shan, reestablished the alliance with Sun Quan, and the two states would remain allies until Shu's eventual destruction in 263.

== Early reign ==
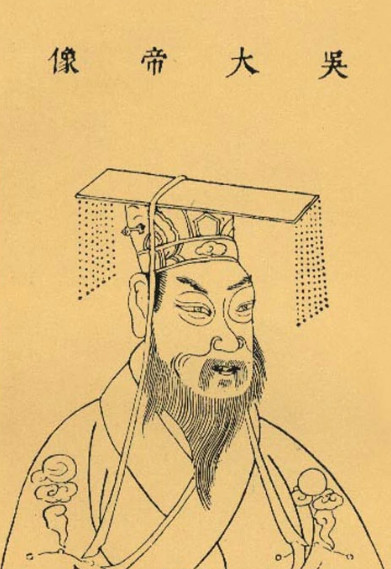
Portrait of Sun Quan from Sancai Tuhui

Early in Sun Quan's reign, the Wu administration was known for its efficiency, as Sun showed a knack for listening to correct advice and for delegating authorities to the proper individuals. For example, he correctly trusted the faithful Lu Xun and Zhuge Jin, so much so that he made a duplicate imperial seal and left it with Lu Xun; whenever he would correspond with Shu's emperor Liu Shan or regent Zhuge Liang, he would deliver the letter to Lu Xun first (as Lu's post was near the Shu border), and then if, in Lu's opinion, changes were needed, he would revise the letter and then restamp it with Sun's imperial seal. Further, Lu Xun and Zhuge Jin were authorised to coordinate their actions with Shu without prior imperial approval. Sun Quan treated his high-level officials as friends and addressed them accordingly (with courtesy names), and in accordance they dedicated all effort to Wu's preservation. He also knew what were the proper roles for officials that he trusted; for example, in 225, when selecting a chancellor, while the key officials all respected Zhang Zhao greatly and wanted him to be chancellor, Sun Quan declined, reasoning that while he respected Zhang greatly, a chancellor needed to handle all affairs of state, and Zhang, while capable, had such strong opinions that he would surely be in conflict with Sun Quan and other officials at all times. He also repeatedly promoted his official Lü Fan even though, while Sun Quan was young, Lü Fan had informed Sun Ce about his improper spending habits. Sun Quan understood that Lü did so only out of loyalty to Sun Ce.

In 224 and 225, Cao Pi again made attacks on Wu, but each time the Wu forces were able to repel Wei's with fair ease—so easily that Cao Pi made the comment, "Heaven created the Yangtze to divide the north and south." However, Sun Quan was himself equally unsuccessful in efforts to make major attacks on Wei. After Cao Pi's death in 226, for example, Sun Quan launched an attack on Wei's Jiangxia Commandery, but was forced to withdraw as soon as Wei reinforcements arrived. However, later that year, he was able to increase his effective control over Jiao Province when his general Lü Dai was able to defeat the warlord Shi Hui (士徽) and end the effective independence that the Shi clan had. In addition, the several independent kingdoms in modern Cambodia, Laos, and southern Vietnam all became Wu vassals as well.

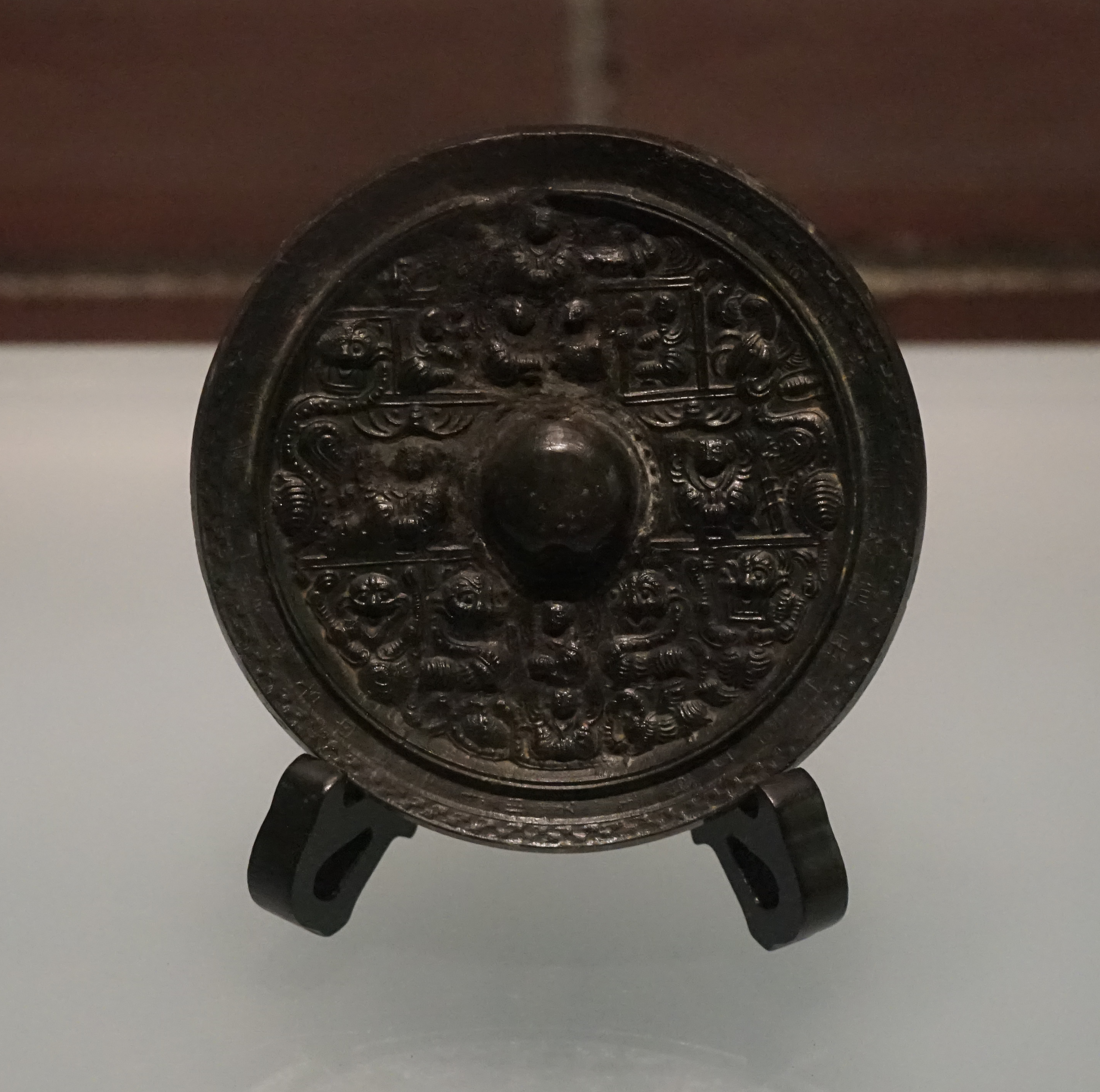
Mirror with Immortals and Mythical Beast. Cast in 229, the year Sun Quan declared himself emperor.

The Book of Liang records the arrival in 226 of a merchant from the Roman Empire (Daqin) at Jiaozhi (Chinese-controlled northern Vietnam). The Prefect of Jiaozhou sent him to the court of Sun Quan in Nanjing. Sun Quan requested that he provide him with a report on his native country and its people. An expedition was mounted to return the merchant along with 10 female and 10 male "blackish coloured dwarfs" he had requested as a curiosity and a Chinese officer who, unfortunately, died en route.

The one major victory that Wu would have over Wei during this period came in 228, when, with Sun Quan's approval, his general Zhou Fang pretended to be surrendering to Wei after pretending to have been punished repeatedly by Sun Quan. This tricked the Wei general Cao Xiu, who led a large army south to support Zhou Fang. He walked into the trap set by Zhou Fang and Lu Xun and suffered major losses, but was saved from total annihilation by Jia Kui.

In 229, Sun Quan declared himself emperor, which almost damaged the alliance with Shu, as many Shu officials saw this as a sign of betrayal of the Han dynasty—to which Shu claimed to be the legitimate successor. However, Zhuge Liang opposed ending the alliance and in fact confirmed it with a formal treaty later that year, in which the two states pledged to support each other and divide Wei equally if they could conquer it. Later that year, Sun Quan moved his capital from Wuchang to Jianye, leaving his crown prince Sun Deng, assisted by Lu Xun, in charge of the western parts of Eastern Wu.

== Middle reign ==
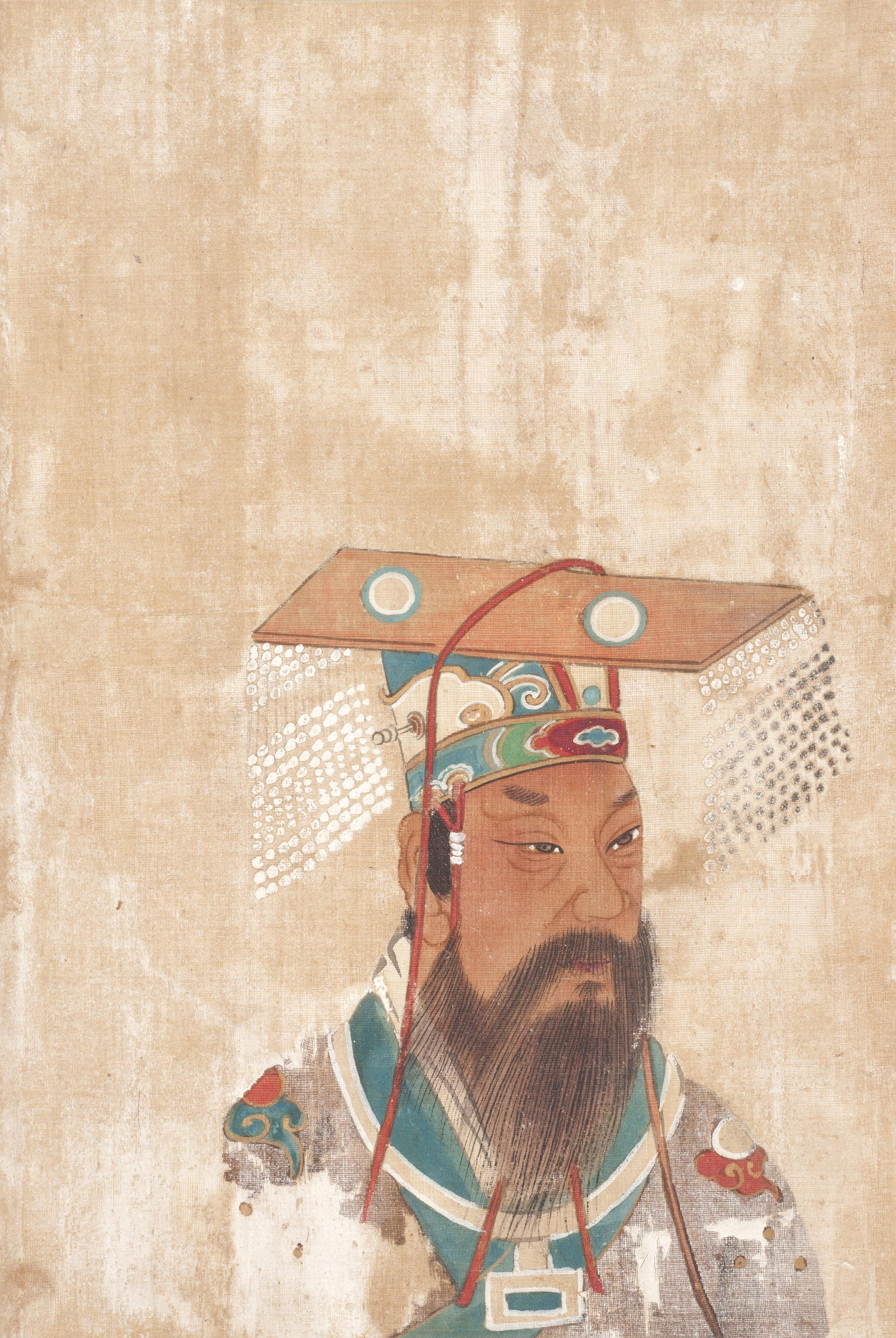
As depicted in the album Portraits of Famous Men, c. 1900, housed in the Philadelphia Museum of Art

In 230, however, the first sign of the deterioration of Sun Quan's reign occurred. That year, he sent his generals Wei Wen (衛溫) and Zhuge Zhi (諸葛直) with a navy of 10,000 into the East China Sea to seek the legendary islands of Yizhou (夷洲) and Danzhou (亶洲), to seek to conquer them, despite strenuous opposition of Lu Xun and Quan Cong. The navy was not able to locate Danzhou but located Yizhou, and returned in 231 after capturing several thousand men—but only after 80–90% of the navy had died from illness. Instead of seeing his own fault in this venture, Sun Quan simply executed Wei Wen and Zhuge Zhi. Perhaps concerned about this deterioration in Sun Quan's judgment, Sun Deng left the western empire in Lu Xun's hands in 232 and returned to Jianye, and would remain at Jianye until his own death in 241.

In 232, Sun Quan had another misadventure involving his navy—as he sent his generals Zhou He (周賀) and Pei Qian (裴濳) to the nominal Wei vassal Gongsun Yuan, in control of Liaodong Commandery, to purchase horses, against the advice of Yu Fan—and indeed, he exiled Yu Fan to the desolate Cangwu Commandery (roughly modern Wuzhou, Guangxi) as punishment. Just as Yu Fan predicted, however, the venture would end in failure—as Zhou He and Pei Qian, on their way back, were intercepted by Wei forces and killed. Regretting his actions, Sun Quan tried to recall Yu Fan back to Jianye, only to learn that Yu had died in exile.

The next year, however, Sun Quan would have yet another misadventure in his dealings with Gongsun Yuan, as Gongsun sent messengers to him, offering to be his subject. Sun Quan was ecstatic, and appointed Gongsun Yuan the Prince of Yan and granted him the nine bestowments, and further sent a detachment of 10,000 men by sea north to assist Gongsun Yuan in his campaign against Wei, against the advice of nearly every single one of his high-level officials, particularly Zhang Zhao. Once the army arrived, however, Gongsun Yuan betrayed them, killing Sun Quan's officials Zhang Mi (張彌), Xu Yan (許晏) and He Da (son of He Qi), whom Sun had sent to grant the bestowments and seized their troops. Once that happened, the enraged Sun Quan wanted to personally head north with a fleet to attack Gongsun Yuan, and initially, not even Lu Xun's opposition was able to stop him, although he eventually calmed down and did not follow through. To his credit, he also personally went to Zhang Zhao's house and apologised to him. Further, despite the deterioration in his previous clear thinking, he was still capable of making proper decisions at times. For example, in 235, when, as a sign of contempt, Wei's emperor Cao Rui offered horses to him in exchange for pearls, jade, and tortoise shells, Sun Quan ignored the implicit insult and made the exchange, reasoning that his empire needed horses much more than pearls, jade or tortoise shells.

In 234, in coordination with Zhuge Liang's final northern expedition against Wei, Sun Quan personally led a major attack against Wei's border city Hefei, while having Lu Xun and Zhuge Jin attack Xiangyang, with the strategy of trying to attract Wei relief forces and then attacking them. However, Wei generals correctly saw the situation and simply let Sun Quan siege Hefei. Only after Sun Quan's food supplies ran low did Cao Rui personally arrive with reinforcements, and Sun withdrew, as did Lu Xun and Zhuge Jin.

In 238, when Gongsun Yuan was under attack by Wei's general Sima Yi, Sun Quan, despite his prior rage against Gongsun, correctly judged the situation as one where he might be able to take advantage if Sima Yi were initially unsuccessful, so he did not immediately refuse Gongsun's request for help. However, as Sima Yi was able to conquer Gongsun Yuan quickly, Sun Quan never launched the major attack that he considered if Sima got stuck in a stalemate with Gongsun. That year, he also recognised how Lü Yi, the supervisor of the audit bureau, had been abusing his powers, and had Lü Yi executed; he then further confirmed his trust in the high-level officials by personally writing an emotional letter to Zhuge Jin, Bu Zhi, Zhu Ran, and Lü Dai, blaming himself for the recent problems with his administration while urging them to speak out honestly whenever they saw faults in him.

In 241, Sun Quan would launch the last major assault against Wei of his reign, in light of Cao Rui's death in 239, but he rejected a strategy offered by Yin Zha (殷札) to attack Wei in coordinated effort with Shu on four different fronts, and the campaign ended in failure as well.

== Late reign ==
Later in 241, the crown prince Sun Deng died—an event that left open the issue of succession and appeared to mark the start of a precipitous decline in Sun Quan's mental health. In 242, he appointed his son Sun He, born to Consort Wang, crown prince. However, he also favoured another son by Consort Wang, Sun Ba, and permitted Sun Ba to have the same staffing level as the crown prince—a move that a number of officials objected to as encouraging Sun Ba to compete with Sun He, but Sun Quan did not listen to them. After 245, when Sun He and Sun Ba began to have separate residences, their relationship deteriorated further, and Sun Ba began to scheme at how to seize heir status from Sun He. Fanned by gossip from his daughter Sun Luban, Sun Quan blamed Sun He's mother Consort Wang for this—and she died in fear. He also cut off Sun He and Sun Ba's access to the officials who supported them in hopes of receiving future favours, but this could not stop Sun Ba's machinations. Indeed, when Lu Xun tried to intervene to protect Sun He, Sun Ba falsely accused him of many crimes, and Sun Quan became provoked so much that he repeatedly rebuked Lu Xun, causing Lu to die in frustration.

In 250, fed up with Sun Ba's constant attacks against Sun He, Sun Quan carried out an inexplicable combination of actions. He forced Sun Ba to commit suicide, while deposing Sun He (Note: Sun He was not known to have committed any crimes.), and instead creating his youngest son, Sun Liang, crown prince to replace Sun He. This move was opposed by his son-in-law Zhu Ju (Note: husband of Sun Quan's daughter Sun Luyu), but Zhu Ju's pleas not only did not help Sun He, but also resulted in his own death, as Sun Quan forced him to commit suicide. Many other officials who also opposed the move, as well as officials who had supported Sun Ba, were executed.

Around this time, Sun Quan also had his generals destroy a number of levees near the border with Wei, creating large areas of flooding, in order to obstruct potential attacks from Wei.

In 251, Sun Quan created the first empress of his reign—Sun Liang's mother and Sun Quan's lifelong beloved wife Consort Pan (Note: Previously, Sun Quan had a succession of wives, but never made any of them empress.). Later that year, however, he realised that Sun He was blameless and wanted to recall him from his exile, but was persuaded not to do so by his daughter Sun Luban and Sun Jun, who had supported Sun Liang's ascension. He realised that he was getting very old (69 by this point) and, at Sun Jun's recommendation, commissioned Zhuge Jin's son Zhuge Ke as the future regent for Sun Liang, even though he correctly had misgivings about how Zhuge Ke was arrogant and had overly high opinions of his own abilities. At that time virtually the entire empire, awed by Zhuge's prior military victories, was convinced that Zhuge would be the correct choice for regent.

In 252, as Sun Quan neared death, Empress Pan was murdered, but how she was murdered remains a controversy. Wu officials claimed that her servants, unable to stand her temper, strangled her while she was asleep, while a number of historians, including Hu Sanxing, the commentator to Sima Guang's Zizhi Tongjian, believed that top Wu officials were complicit, as they feared that she would seize power as empress dowager after Sun Quan's death. On 252, Sun Quan died at the age of 70 (by East Asian age reckoning), and Sun Liang succeeded him. Sun Quan was buried in August or September 252 with Empress Pan in a mausoleum at the Purple Mountain in Jianye.

== Faith and spirituality ==
Sun Quan initially believed in Taoism and communicated frequently with Taoist priests such as Ge Xuan, Yao Guang, and Jie Xiang. However, in 247, when Kang Senghui, a Buddhist monk from Jiaozhi (modern-day northern Vietnam), arrived in the state of Wu, Sun Quan had a conversation with him and ultimately chose to convert to Buddhism. With the support of Sun Quan, the Buddhist temple named Jianchusi (建初寺) was established in the Jiangnan region.

== Consorts and issue ==
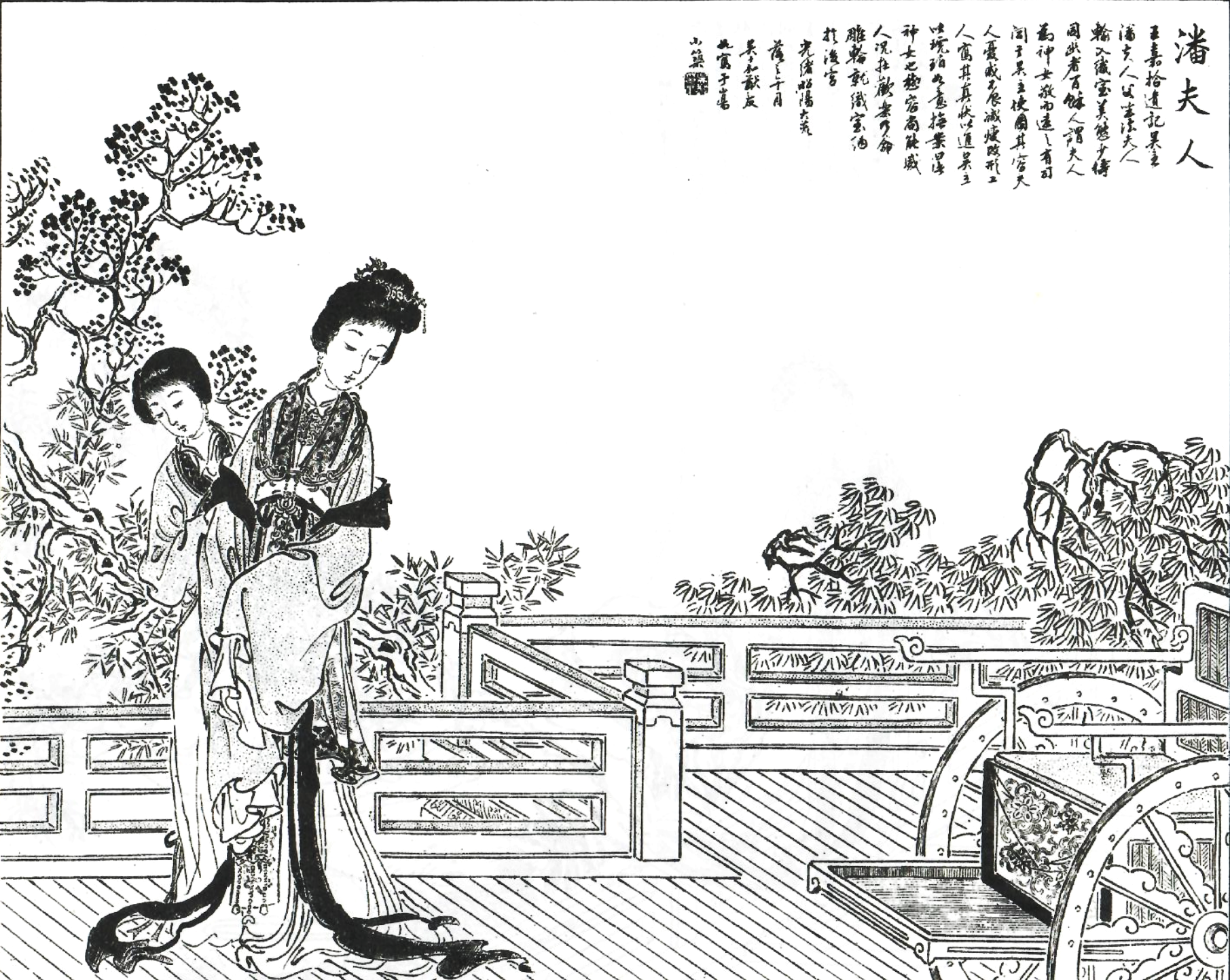
An Qing Dynasty painting of Empress Pan, who is listed on the 100 most famous beauties in Chinese history

- Empress Pan, of the Pan clan (潘氏, d. 252), personal name Shu (淑)
  - Sun Liang, Prince of Kuaiji (會稽王 孫亮, 245–260), seventh son
- Empress Jianghui, of the Wang clan (敬懷皇后王氏)
  - Sun Xiu, Emperor Jing (吳景帝 孫休, 235–264), sixth son
- Empress Dayi, of the Wang clan (大懿皇后 王氏)
  - Sun He, Prince of Nanyang (南陽王 孫和, 224–253), third son
- Empress Bu, of the Bu clan (步氏), personal name Lianshi (練師)
  - Princess Quan (全公主/全主, 229–258), personal name Luban (魯班), first daughter
    - Married Zhou Xun (周循), a son of Zhou Yu
    - Married Quan Cong, Marquis of Qiantang (錢塘侯), in 229, a son of Quan Rou and had issue (two sons)
  - Princess Zhu (朱公主/朱主), personal name Luyu (魯育), third daughter
    - Married Zhu Ju, Marquis of Yunyang (朱據 雲陽侯) in 229 and had issues (a daughter)
    - Married Liu Zuan (劉纂) in 250
- Consort Zhong, of the Zhong clan (仲姬仲氏)
  - Sun Fen, Prince of Qi (齊王 孫奮, d. 270), fifth son
- Consort Xie, of the Xie clan (谢姬 谢氏)
  - Sun Ba, Prince of Lu (魯王; d. 250), fourth son
- Furen Xie, of the Xie clan (謝夫人 谢氏)
- Furen Xu, of the Xu clan (徐夫人徐氏)
- Furen, of the Yuan clan (袁夫人 袁氏)
- Furen, of the Zhao clan (趙夫人 趙氏)
- Unknown
  - Sun Deng, Crown Prince Xuan (宣太子 孫登, 209–241), first son
  - Princess Liu (刘公主), 2nd daughter
    - Married Liu Zuan (劉纂)
  - Sun Lü, Marquis of Jianchang (建昌侯 孫慮, 213–232), second son

== Era names ==
- Huangwu (黄武; 黃武; Huángwǔ; Huang-wu) 222–229
- Huanglong (黄龙; 黃龍; Huánglóng; Huang-lung) 229–231
- Jiahe (嘉禾; Jiāhé; Chia-ho) 232–238
- Chiwu (赤乌; 赤烏; Chìwū; Chih-wu) 238–251
- Taiyuan (太元; Taìyuán; Tai-yuan) 251–252
- Shenfeng (神凤; 神鳳; Shénfèng; Shen-feng) 252

== In popular culture ==
=== Music ===
There is a song named after Sun Quan in Luo Tianyi's 權御天下 (Sun Quan The Emperor)

=== Video games ===
Sun Quan appears as a playable character in Koei's Dynasty Warriors and Warriors Orochi video game series.

Sun Quan also appears in the mobile video game Puzzle & Dragons as part of the Three Kingdoms Gods series.

Sun Quan is also a playable character in Total War: Three Kingdoms as part of the Sun family faction.

=== Card games ===
In the collectible card game Magic: The Gathering there is a card named "Sun Quan, Lord of Wu", in the Portal Three Kingdoms set.

In the selection of hero cards in the Chinese card game San Guo Sha, there is also a Sun Quan hero that players can select at the beginning of the game.

In the collectible card game Yu-Gi-Oh! there is a card based on Sun Quan named “Ancient Warriors- Masterful Sun Mou.”

=== Film and television ===
Zhang Bo, in the 2010 Chinese television series Three Kingdoms.

Zheng Wei as a child, in the 2010 Chinese television series Three Kingdoms.

Taiwanese actor Chang Chen portrayed Sun Quan in John Woo's 2008 two-part epic war film Red Cliff.

Deng Haifeng, in the 2017 Chinese television series The Advisors Alliance.

== See also ==
- Lists of people of the Three Kingdoms
- List of Chinese monarchs

== Notes ==
Emperor Da of Eastern Wu House of Sun Born: 182 Died: 252
Regnal titles
Preceded by Himself as Marquis of Wu	King of Wu; 222–229	Succeeded by Himself as Emperor of Eastern Wu
Preceded by Himself as King of Wu	Emperor of Eastern Wu; 229–252	Succeeded by Sun Liang
Chinese nobility
Preceded by Himself	Marquis of Nanchang; 219–222	Succeeded by Himself as King of Wu
Titles in pretence
Preceded by Emperor Xian of Han	— TITULAR — Emperor of China; 229–252; Reason for succession failure: Three Kingdoms	Succeeded by Sun Liang
