= Lu Yun =

Chinese writer and official (262–303)

Lu Yun 陸雲
- Born: Family name: Lu (陸); Given name: Yun (雲); Courtesy name: Shilong (士龍); 262
- Died: c.November 303 (aged 41)
- Occupations: Essayist, politician, writer
- Relatives: Lu Xun (grandfather); Lu Kang (father); Lu Jing (brother); Lu Ji (brother)
- Writing career
- Notable works: Suimu Fu (歲暮賦); Da Xiong Pingyuan Shi (答兄平原詩); Zeng Shi Gu Yanxian (贈詩顧彥先); Yu Xiong Pingyuan Shi (與兄平原書)

Lu Yun (262 – c.November 303), courtesy name Shilong, was a Chinese essayist, politician, and writer who lived during the late Three Kingdoms period and Jin dynasty of China. He was the fifth son of Lu Kang, a general of the state of Eastern Wu in the Three Kingdoms period, and a grandson of Lu Xun, a prominent general and statesman who served as the third Imperial Chancellor of Eastern Wu. Together with his brother, Lu Ji, they became famous celebrities under the Jin after the fall of Wu, and they were both known as the "Two Lus" (二陸).

== Life ==
Lu Yun was born into the Lu clan of Wu Commandery as the son of the general, Lu Kang. He was able to write at the age of six and was recommended for the imperial examination when he was sixteen. After Eastern Wu fell to the Western Jin in 280, he and his brother Lu Ji decided to retire to their hometown, where they furthered their studies for ten years. The brothers eventually travelled north to the Jin capital, Luoyang in 289. They were initially ridiculed by the locals due to their Wu accents, but they soon gained fame meeting with and impressing the minister of rites, Zhang Hua. He, his brother and his fellow southerner, Gu Rong were referred to as the "Three Eminence" (三俊) during their time in Luoyang. Lu Yun was then summoned to serve as an official under the provincial inspector, Zhou Jun, who compared him to the ancient disciple of Confucius, Yan Hui.

Later, Lu Yun served as a prefect of the gentlemen of the palace under the prince of Wu, Sima Yan (司馬晏; father of Sima Ye). His biography in the Book of Jin contains two essays written for Sima Yan, highlighting his candid and outspoken character as he admonished the prince for his policies. After this stint, he served in succession as gentleman of writing, imperial clerk, internal companion of the crown prince and palace gentleman writer.

Lu Yun was recommended by the Prince of Chengdu, Sima Ying to become Interior Minister of Qinghe, thus his nickname "Lu Qinghe" (陸清河). In January 303, Ying became a part of a conspiracy with the Prince of Hejian, Sima Yong to overthrow the Prince of Qi and Emperor Hui of Jin's regent, Sima Jiong. Lu Yun was appointed vanguard general to attack Jiong at Luoyang from Ying's base in Ye, but before he could arrive, the Prince of Changsha, Sima Ai killed Jiong and took over the imperial court. In the following months, as the political situation decline, Lu Yun became increasingly vocal and often went against the emperor's wishes. When the eunuch, Meng Jiu (孟玖) wanted to appoint his own father as Prefect of Handan, many among Sima Ying's staff agreed including his chief advisor, Lu Zhi, but Lu Yun angrily objected and insulted Meng Jiu, causing Meng Jiu to resent him. Afterwards, Lu Yun was supposed to lead a campaign against the rebel Zhang Chang in Jing province, but the order was cancelled as Sima Ying decided to send his army against Sima Ai.

During the siege of Luoyang, Lu Ji suffered a catastrophic defeat to Sima Ai and was executed by Sima Ying after he was slandered by Meng Jiu. Lu Ji's family were implicated and placed under arrest, including Lu Yun. Several ministers such as Cai Ke (father of Cai Mo) and Jiang Tong all pleaded Sima Ying to spare Lu Yun and his family, (Note: Lu Zhi was in favour of executing Lu Yun; he reminded Sima Ying that when Empress Yang Yan's maternal uncle Zhao Jun was killed by Sima Lun, his son Zhao Xiang was spared. However, Zhao Xiang later joined Sima Ying and attacked Sima Lun.) so the prince hesitated for three days. In the end, however, Meng Jiu hustled Ying away and ordered for Lu Yun and his family to be executed to the third degree. Lu Yun was 42 years old by East Asian age reckoning when he died. He was buried in Qinghe by his students and former officials.

Lu Yun's biography in the Book of Jin states that he wrote 349 articles and 10 pieces of "New Books" that were circulated. The "Records of Classic" in the Book of Sui also states that there were 12 volumes of Lu Yun's collected works, all of which are lost today. Ming dynasty scholar Zhang Pu made a compilation of works by 130 writers from the Han, Wei and Six Dynasties which contains two volumes of Lu Yun's works. Southern dynasties writer, Liu Xie, in his work, The Literary Mind and the Carving of Dragons, commented that Lu Yun's writing style was "fresh and clean, and he was good at writing short articles".
