= Zhang Cheng =

Zhang Cheng may refer to:

- Zhang Cheng (Han dynasty) (張承; died c. 218), courtesy name Gongxian, an official of the late Eastern Han dynasty
- Zhang Cheng (Three Kingdoms) (張承; 178–244), courtesy name Zhongsi, a military general of Eastern Wu in the Three Kingdoms period
- Zhang Cheng (footballer) (张诚; born 1989), Chinese footballer
