= Lu Ji (Shiheng) =

Chinese writer, general and official (261–303)

Lu Ji 陸機
- Born: Family name: Lu (陸); Given name: Ji (機); Courtesy name: Shiheng (士衡); 261
- Died: c.November 303 (aged 42)
- Occupations: Essayist, military general, politician, writer
- Relatives: Lu Xun (grandfather); Lu Kang (father); Lu Yun (brother); Lu Jing (brother); Gu Ti (father-in-law) (Note: The Book of Song recorded that Gu Ti's son Gu Qian was Lu Ji's brother-in-law, and that Lady Gu was older than Gu Qian. This record was found in the biography of Gu Jizhi (顾觊之), who was a great-great-grandson of Gu Qian.)
- Writing career
- Notable works: Meng Hu Xing (猛虎行); Junzi Xing (君子行); Chang'an You Xia Xie Xing (長安有狹邪行); Fu Luo Dao Zhong Zuo (赴洛道中作); Bian Wang Lun (辯亡論)

Lu Ji (c. 261 – c. November 303), courtesy name Shiheng, was a Chinese essayist, military general, politician, and writer who lived during the late Three Kingdoms period and Jin dynasty of China. He was the fourth son of Lu Kang, a general of the state of Eastern Wu in the Three Kingdoms period, and a grandson of Lu Xun, a prominent general and statesman who served as the third Imperial Chancellor of Eastern Wu.

== Life ==
Lu Ji was related to the imperial family of the state of Eastern Wu. He was the fourth son of the general Lu Kang, who was a maternal grandson of Sun Ce, the elder brother and predecessor of Eastern Wu's founding emperor, Sun Quan. His paternal grandfather, Lu Xun, was a prominent general and statesman who served as the third Imperial Chancellor of Eastern Wu. After the Jin dynasty conquered Eastern Wu in 280 and killed two of his brothers, Lu Ji and his brother Lu Yun fled to Hua Ting in exile. While in exile, Lu wrote Dialectic of Destruction on the fall of the Wu empire. In 290, Lu and his brother moved to the Jin imperial capital, Luoyang. He served as a writer under the Jin government and was appointed president of the imperial academy. In 296, he was appointed to a military position. Lu's army suffered major casualties in a battle against Sima Ai in November 303 as part of the War of the Eight Princes. Shortly thereafter, Lu, his sons, and his two brothers were charged with treason and executed.

== Writings ==
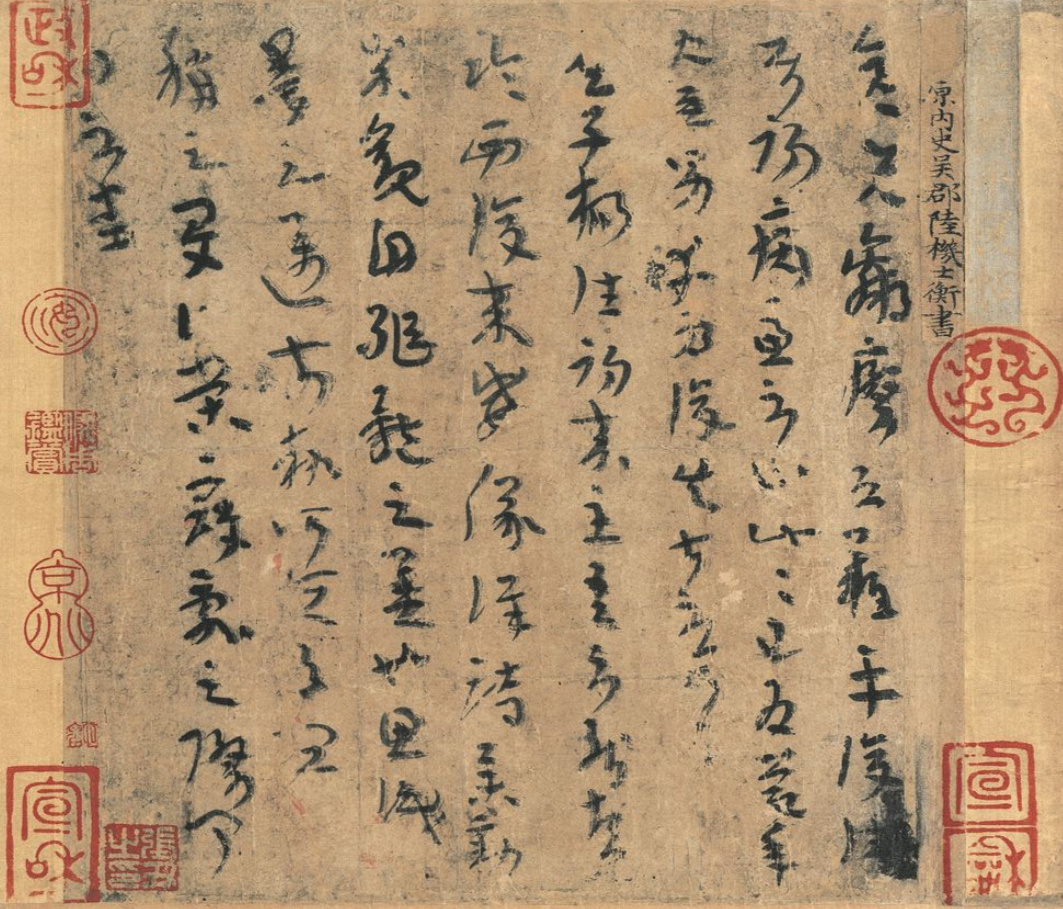
Pingfu Tie (平復帖) by Lu Ji, Palace Museum collection

Lu Ji wrote much lyric poetry but is better known for writing fu, a mixture of prose and poetry. He is best remembered for the Wen fu (文賦; On Literature), a piece of literary criticism that discourses on the principles of composition. Achilles Fang commented:

The Wen-fu is considered one of the most articulate treatises on Chinese poetics. The extent of its influence in Chinese literary history is equaled only by that of the sixth-century The Literary Mind and the Carving of Dragons of Liu Hsieh. In the original, the Wen-fu is rhymed, but does not employ regular rhythmic patterns: hence the term "rhymeprose."

English translations of the Wen fu were done by E.R. Hughes and Achilles Fang. Chen Shixiang translated Wen fu into verse because, although the piece was rightly called the beginning of Chinese literary criticism, Lu Ji wrote it as poetry. Poets influenced by Wen fu include Ezra Pound, Gary Snyder, Howard Nemerov, Eleanor Wilner, Carolyn Kizer, and Olav H. Hauge.

Lu Ji is also the writer of the oldest extant work of Chinese calligraphy, a short letter to his friends that has been named the Pingfutie (Consoling Letter).

== See also ==
- Lists of people of the Three Kingdoms
