= Zhan Furui =

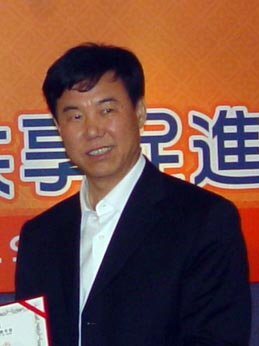
- Born: November 1953 (age 72); Hebei Province, China
- Occupation: National Library of China
- Known for: Chinese librarian

Zhan Furui (Chinese: 詹福瑞; pinyin: Zhān Fúrùi; born November 1953) is a former National Librarian of China and a literary critic.

== Biographical sketches ==
Zhan was born in Hebei Province, China. He got his Ph.D. degree in Chinese Literature in Hebei University in 1991. He was Director-General of National Library of China until 2009, Director of the National Center for Ancient Book Preservation and chairman of the Library Society of China. He is known for his achievements in the studies of history of Chinese literary criticism and ancient Chinese literature.

Zhan is a deputy of The National People's Congress during 2008-2017.

== Education ==
- 1986-1991: Graduated from Institute of Ancient Books, Hebei University, with Ph.D degree
- 1975-1978: Graduated from Department of Chinese Language, Hebei University, with B.A. degree

== Work experiences ==
- December 2009-January 2014: Executive Deputy Director-General, National Library of China
- January 2005-December 2009: Director-General, National Library of China
- September 2004-January 2005: Vice-Director-General, National Library of China
- August 1998-September 2003: Secretary-General of CPC Committee, Hebei University
- April 1996-August 1999: Vice-President, Hebei University
- May 1993-April 1996: Professor and Dean, Department of Chinese Language, Hebei University
- July 1991-April 1993: Teacher and Associate Professor, Institute of Ancient Books, Hebei University
- September 1978-September 1986: Teacher, Department of Chinese Languages, Hebei University

== Titles in professional organizations ==
- Chairman, Library Society of China
- Member, Chinese Literature Section, National Committee for Academic Degrees
- Reviewer, National Foundation for Social Sciences
- Member, Chinese Literature Guiding Committee, Ministry of Culture
- Vice-Chairman, Society of Ancient Chinese Literary Theory
- Vice-Chairman, Chinese Society of Li Bai Studies
- Standing Committee Member, Chinese Society of Qu Yuan Studies
- Vice-Chairman, Chinese Society of Wen Xin Diao Long (The literary mind and the carving of dragons)
- Member, Hebei Provincial Committee of Academic Degrees
- Vice-Chairman, Section of Literature and History, Hebei Provincial Foundation for Social Sciences
- Vice-Chairman, Hebei Provincial Society of Literature

== Major works ==
- 《岁月深处》 (Deep in the Lifetime : Poems) （北京 : 人民文学出版社, 2011）
- 《文质彬彬 : 序跋与短论集》 (Selected Prefaces, Postscripts and Short Essays) （紫禁城出版社, 2009）
- 《大学语文》 (Chinese Language for University Students) （河北教育出版社, 2008）
- 《不求甚解 : 读民国古代文学研究十八篇》 (18 Essays on the Studies of Ancient Literature during 1911-49) （北京 : 中华书局, 2008）
- 《中古文学理论范畴》 (Categories of Medieval Literary Theory) （北京 : 中华书局, 2005）
- 《南朝诗歌思潮》 (Poetical Thoughts of the Southern Dynasty) （保定 : 河北大学出版社, 2005）
- 《士族的挽歌 : 南北朝文人的悲欢离合》 (Stories of Scholars in the Southern and Northern Dynasties) （与李金善合著；保定 : 河北大学出版社, 2002）
- 《汉魏六朝文学论集》 (Essays on Literature in the Han, Wei and the Six Dynasties) （保定 : 河北大学出版社, 2001）
- 《中古文学理论范畴》 (Categories of Medieval Literary Theory) （保定 : 河北大学出版社, 1997）
- 《走向世俗 : 南朝诗歌思潮》 (Poetical Thoughts of the Southern Dynasty) （天津 : 百花文艺出版社, 1995）
