= Wen fu =

Wen fu (traditional Chinese: 文賦; simplified Chinese: 文赋), translated as "Essay on Literature", "The Poetic Exposition on Literature" or "Rhymeprose on Literature", is an important work in the history of fu poetry itself written in the Fu poetic form by the poet, general, and statesman Lu Ji (261–303), which expounds the philosophical basis of poetry and its rhetorical forms. Achilles Fang wrote that it is considered "one of the most articulate treatises on Chinese poetics. The extent of its influence in Chinese literary history is equaled only by that of the sixth-century The Literary Mind and the Carving of Dragons of Liu Xie. It is called a "hymn of praise for the craft and art of writing and a specific, prescriptive handbook for the writer."

== Form and philosophy ==
Part of a title page of Wen fu

Stephen Owen writes that Wen fu is a work of "both literature and literary thought", "a work of such originality that it could not have been anticipated from the works that preceded it.... nothing like it ever had been written concerning literature". The work introduced a new vocabulary that remains influential, though in many cases problematic. Moving away from questions such as the ethical purpose of literature, its social context, or the expression of personality, Lu Ji turns to the Neo-Taoist theory of mind and its cosmological basis. This philosophical stance describes the poet's mind as wandering through the microcosmos within his own body in search of encounters that form the origin of literary work. The fu as a poetic form was known for its verbal display, usually cataloguing and listing an array of items in order to say everything that could be said on a topic. Lu presents this philosophical stance in a series of balanced elements that unfold in an orderly way. For instance, Lu balances what the poet learns from thinking against what is learned from reading. These antithetical elements are then amplified and repeated in different contexts, often with statements and counter-statements in order to avoid being one-sided.

The Wen fu is rhymed, but does not employ regular rhythmic patterns: hence the term "rhymeprose".

Wen fu has influenced modern poets such as Ezra Pound, Gary Snyder, Howard Nemerov, Eleanor Wilner, and Carolyn Kizer.

== Translations ==
- Chen Shixiang, translator, —— (1952). Essay on Literature. Portland, Me.: Anthoensen Press. Internet Archive free access link The first translation into English, reprinted in Cyril Birch, ed. p. 222. 232
- Fang, Achilles (1951). "Rhymeprose on Literature The Wên-Fu of Lu Chi (A.D. 261–303)". Harvard Journal of Asiatic Studies. 14 (3/4): 527–66. doi:10.2307/2718186. JSTOR 2718186.. Reprinted in Mair, Victor H. (1994). The Columbia Anthology of Traditional Chinese Literature. New York: Columbia University Press. ISBN 0-231-07428-X., pp. 124–133.
- Sam Hamill (1991). The Art of Writing : Lu Chi's Wen Fu. Barbarian Press (Mission B.C.) and Milkweed Editions (Minneapolis, MN). ISBN 0-920971-06-7.
- Stephen Owen, "The Poetic Exposition on Literature." Annotated, with an introductory section.
