= Lady Zhang (Eastern Wu) =

Lady Zhang (3rd century – 253 CE) was a Chinese noble woman from the Three Kingdoms. She was the principal consort of Sun He, the Crown Prince of the Eastern Wu dynasty. She was the daughter of Zhang Cheng and the granddaughter of Zhang Zhao. Additionally, she was the niece of Zhuge Ke.

== Biography ==
When Lady Zhang's father, Zhang Cheng, lost his first wife, Zhang Zhao intended to take Zhuge Jin's daughter as his second wife. However, Zhang Cheng, who was friends with Zhuge Jin and only a few years younger, was hesitant. Following persuasion by Sun Quan, Zhang Cheng eventually married Zhuge Jin's daughter, and they had Lady Zhang. Lady Zhang had a half-brother, Zhang Zhen, from the same mother, and she later married Lu Kang.

Sun Quan, the ruler of Eastern Wu, arranged for his third son, Sun He, to marry Lady Zhang and even instructed Sun He to show respect to Zhang Cheng as his father-in-law. The relationship between Sun He and Lady Zhang was harmonious, and she was invited to visit her uncle, Zhang Xiu.

In 251 CE, Sun He was appointed as the Prince of Nanyang and resided in Changsha. When Sun Liang ascended to the throne, Lady Zhang sent Chen Qian to present memorials to the Empress Dowager and, at the same time, visit her maternal uncle, Zhuge Ke, who was in power at the time. Zhuge Ke told Chen Qian, "Tell Lady Zhang that one day, I will make her surpass all other women." However, shortly after, Zhuge Ke was assassinated by Sun Jun. Zhuge Ke's words were seen as an intention to restore Sun He, so Sun Jun and Sun Luban sent Sun He to Xindu County and ordered his execution. Sun He bid farewell to Lady Zhang, who said, "Whether it's good or bad, I will go through it with you. I cannot live alone." Consequently, the couple committed suicide together. Sun Hao's birth mother, Lady He, raised Sun Hao and his three younger brothers to adulthood.

After Sun Hao's ascension, his mother Lady He was honored as the Empress and Empress Dowager, but there was no mention of his birth mother.

Lady Zhang and Sun He's youngest son, Sun Jun, was later executed by Sun Hao. They also had a daughter who married Lu Jing as a princess.

== Sources ==
- Records of the Three Kingdoms (Sanguozhi), Wu Book 5, Biographies of Consorts and Concubines, Volume 5
