= Pei Xuan =

Pei Xuan may refer to:

- Pei Xuan (Three Kingdoms) (裴玄), Three Kingdoms period scholar
- Pei Xuan (Water Margin) (裴宣), Water Margin character
