= Zhang Fan =

Zhang Fan is the name of:

- Zhang Fan (Han dynasty) (died 212), official under the warlord Cao Cao during the late Han dynasty
- Zhang Fan (basketball) (born 1984), Chinese basketball player
