= Achilles Fang =

Chinese scholar, translator, and educator (1910–1995)

Achilles C. Fang
- Born: August 20, 1910; Chōsen
- Died: November 22, 1995 (aged 85); Cambridge, Massachusetts, United States
- Education: Harvard University (Ph.D.); National Tsing Hua University (B.A.); American Baptist College (Shanghai)
- Spouses: Irene Pan (m. 1935-38, her death); Ilse Martin (m. 1948-95, his death)
- Children: George Wei-ming Fang; Bernard Wei-yin Fang; Madeleine Wei-hsien Fang
- Scientific career
- Fields: Chinese literature, comparative literature
- Institutions: Harvard University; Harvard-Yenching Institute; Fu Jen Catholic University

Chinese name
- Chinese: 方志浵
Transcriptions
Standard Mandarin
- Hanyu Pinyin: Fāng Zhìtóng
- Gwoyeu Romatzyh: Fang Jyhtorng
- Wade–Giles: Fang Chih-t'ung

Achilles Chih-t'ung Fang (Chinese: 方志浵; August 20, 1910 – November 22, 1995) was a Chinese scholar, translator, and educator, best known for his contributions to Chinese literature and comparative literature. Fang was born in Chōsen (Japanese-occupied Korea), but attended university in mainland China. After completing his undergraduate degree, Fang worked for Monumenta Serica, a prominent scholarly journal of Chinese topics. He then moved to the United States, where he took up residency in Cambridge, Massachusetts, studying and teaching courses at Harvard University.

Fang was widely learned, and specialized in comparative literature, particularly in the studies of Chinese and German literature. His correspondence with Ezra Pound significantly influenced Pound's understanding of Chinese subjects, and his doctoral dissertation on Pound, an attempt to compile all the classical allusions in The Cantos, remains an important source for Pound scholars.

== Life and career ==
=== Youth ===
Achilles Fang was born Fang Chih-t'ung (Fang Zhitong 方志浵) into a Chinese family living in Japanese-occupied Korea on August 20, 1910. He eventually left, with the help of a missionary, to attend high school at the American Baptist College in Shanghai. He subsequently majored in philosophy and classical studies at Tsinghua University, where he was one of the few friends of Qian Zhongshu (who would go on to write one of the best-known and most highly regarded works of modern Chinese literature, Fortress Besieged). After graduating in 1932, Fang spent two more years at Tsinghua as a graduate student, and then, within a period of four years spent in Nanjing and Beijing, was married, had a child, and suffered the death of his wife.

=== Monumenta Serica ===
From 1940 to 1947, Fang worked for the East Asian studies journal Monumenta Serica in Beijing, first as editorial secretary and then as associate editor (the latter position he maintained for two years after leaving Beijing in 1947). The main content of Fang's work was to proofread translations in submissions to the journal, and he corrected errors with a scholar's meticulous zeal. Fang's own contributions included a regular "Review of Reviews" feature, wherein he summarized important articles in European and Japanese sinological journals, providing Western Sinologists with news of developments in Japanese Sinology that those without a knowledge of Japanese would otherwise not have had. Fang also taught German during this period, both at Fu-Jen University and the Deutschland-Institut.

=== Harvard ===
In 1947, Fang moved to Cambridge with his son to work on the Harvard-Yenching Institute Chinese-English dictionary project. He was dismissed for constant use of quotations from Finnegans Wake in his entries, and subsequently enrolled in Harvard's comparative literature PhD program, from which he graduated in 1958 (in Burton Pike's graduating class) with a dissertation on Ezra Pound's The Cantos. That dissertation, the 865-page "Materials for the Study of Pound's Cantos,"tracked down all the classical allusions in the Cantos, a work suited to his vast reading in many languages and acute detective instincts, as evidenced by one small example: In Canto 11 is the line, „der in Baluba das Gewitter gemacht hat,“ a quotation that Fang found in one of the seven volumes of Frobenius' Erlebte Erdteile, where the author is referring to the activities of an African shaman.

Fang became friendly with Pound while writing his dissertation, and decided not to publish it for fear of embarrassing Pound over Pound's many errors in his use of sources. During Pound's years at St. Elizabeths, Fang was Pound's key correspondent on Chinese topics.

Fang stayed on at Harvard teaching courses in classical Chinese, Chinese literary theory, and art criticism until he retired in 1977, having spent thirty years there in one capacity or another. He died of cancer in 1995, and was buried in Mount Auburn Cemetery. In 1997, through a gift of "the students and friends of Achilles Fang," Harvard established a prize in his honor, "awarded occasionally to a doctoral dissertation on the traditional Chinese humanities or related cultural developments throughout East Asia that continues the tradition, which Achilles Fang exemplified, of rigorous textual research."

== Publications ==
It was said of Fang that "he knew everything, but published little." Indeed, his complete bibliography runs only four pages. Aside from his dissertation, his most significant publication may have been his heavily annotated translation of ten chapters from Sima Guang's Zizhi Tongjian, published as The Chronicle of the Three Kingdoms in Harvard-Yenching Institute Studies VI (1952). His translation and annotation of the Wen fu of Lu Ji is also widely cited.
