= Lu Kang (Eastern Wu) =

State of Eastern Wu general (226-274)

- 陸抗
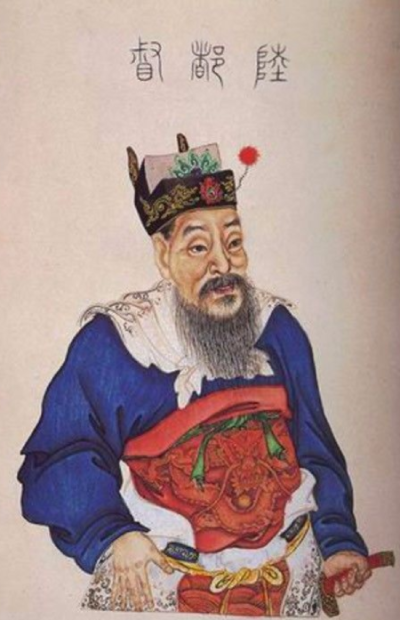

Grand Marshal (大司馬)
- In office April 273 – August or September 274
- Monarch: Sun Hao
- Preceded by: Shi Ji and Ding Feng

Governor of Jing Province (荊州牧)
- In office April 273 – August or September 274
- Monarch: Sun Hao

Protector-General (都護)
- In office 272 – April 273
- Monarch: Sun Hao

Senior General Who Guards the Army (鎮軍大將軍)
- In office 264 – 272
- Monarch: Sun Hao

General Who Guards the Army (鎮軍將軍)
- In office 259 – 264
- Monarch: Sun Xiu

General Who Attacks the North (征北將軍)
- In office 257 – 259
- Monarch: Sun Liang / Sun Xiu

General of Vehement Might (奮威將軍)
- In office 252 – 257
- Monarch: Sun Liang

Personal details
- Born: 226 (Note: The Sanguozhi recorded that Lu Kang was 20 years old (by East Asian age reckoning) when his father Lu Xun died in 245, and that he died in the autumn (7th to 9th months) of the third year of the Feng'huang era of Sun Hao's reign. The Zizhi Tongjian recorded that he died in the 7th month of the 10th year of the Tai'shi era of Sima Yan's reign. The month corresponds to 20 August to 17 September 274 in the Julian calendar. By calculation, Lu Kang's year of birth should be 226 and he was about 48 years old when he died.)
- Died: August or September 274 (aged 48)
- Spouse: Lady Zhang
- Children: Lu Yan (died 22 March 280); Lu Jing; Lu Xuan; Lu Ji; Lu Yun; Lu Dan
- Parents: Lu Xun (father); Lady Sun (mother)
- Occupation: Military general, politician
- Courtesy name: Youjie (幼節)

Lu Kang (226 – August or September 274), courtesy name Youjie, was a Chinese military general and politician of the state of Wu during the Three Kingdoms period of China. He was the second son of Lu Xun, the third Imperial Chancellor of Wu. Lu Kang inherited his father's mantle but was less involved in politics as he served mainly in the Wu military. He rose to prominence during the reign of the fourth and last Wu emperor, Sun Hao. In 272, he successfully suppressed a rebellion by Bu Chan and fended off invading forces from Wu's rival, the Jin dynasty. After the Battle of Xiling, he actively pursued a policy of détente with the Jin general Yang Hu at the Wu–Jin border. At the same time, he constantly submitted memorials to Sun Hao, urging the tyrannical emperor to change his ways and govern with benevolence, but his advice fell on deaf ears. In early 280, less than six years after Lu Kang's death, the Jin dynasty launched a campaign against Wu and conquered it within five months.

== During Sun Quan's reign ==
Lu Kang was the second son of Lu Xun and a maternal grandson of Sun Ce, the elder brother and predecessor of Wu's founding emperor, Sun Quan. Lu Xun died in 245 when Lu Kang was around 19 years old. After his father's death, Lu Kang was commissioned as Colonel Who Establishes Martial Might (建武校尉) and put in charge of 5,000 troops who had been under his father's command. After escorting his father's coffin from Wuchang (武昌; present-day Ezhou, Hubei) back to his ancestral home in Wu Commandery (around present-day Suzhou, Jiangsu) for burial, he traveled to the Wu capital Jianye (present-day Nanjing, Jiangsu) to pay his respects to Sun Quan. In Jianye, Sun Quan showed Lu Kang a list of 20 offenses Lu Xun allegedly committed and questioned Lu Kang about them. He did not allow Lu Kang to meet anyone and interrogated him together with a panel of officials. Lu Kang cooperated and responded truthfully. Sun Quan's anger toward Lu Xun gradually subsided.

In 246, Lu Kang was promoted from Colonel to General of the Household (中郎將) and ordered to switch posts with Zhuge Ke: he would leave Wuchang and move to Chaisang (柴桑; around present-day Jiujiang, Jiangxi) while Zhuge Ke would do vice versa. Before Lu Kang left, he had the city walls repaired and his residence renovated while leaving his fruit orchards intact. When Zhuge Ke arrived in Chaisang, he was surprised to see that Lu Kang had left behind a well-maintained residence for him. He also felt ashamed because his garrison at Chaisang was in poor condition when he departed.

In 251, Lu Kang fell ill and went to Jianye for medical treatment. When his condition improved and he was preparing to leave, Sun Quan came to bid him farewell. With tears in his eyes, Sun Quan told Lu Kang: "Previously, I believed slanderous rumors and failed to understand your father's well-meaning advice. I have let you down. I have burned all the documents containing the allegations against your father so that nobody can ever see them."

== During the reigns of Sun Liang and Sun Xiu ==
Sun Quan died in 252 and was succeeded by his youngest son, Sun Liang, as emperor of Wu. After his coronation, Sun Liang promoted Lu Kang to the rank of General under the title "General of Vehement Might" (奮威將軍). In 257, Zhuge Dan, a general from Wu's rival state Wei, started a rebellion in Shouchun (壽春; present-day Shou County, Anhui) and requested reinforcements from Wu. Sun Liang appointed Lu Kang as the Area Commander of Chaisang (柴桑; around present-day Jiujiang, Jiangxi) and ordered him to lead troops to Shouchun to support Zhuge Dan. Although the rebellion was ultimately suppressed by Wei forces, Lu Kang managed to defeat some Wei forces in battle. In recognition of his efforts, the Wu government promoted him to the position of General Who Attacks the North (征北將軍).

In 259, during the reign of Sun Liang's successor Sun Xiu, Lu Kang was appointed as General Who Guards the Army (鎮軍將軍) and placed in charge of Xiling (西陵; around present-day Yichang, Hubei). The area under his jurisdiction covered the lands from Guan Yu's Shallows to Baidicheng. Sun Xiu granted him acting imperial authority in the following year.

== Early career under Sun Hao ==
Sun Xiu died in 264 and was succeeded by his nephew Sun Hao as the emperor of Wu. Sun Hao promoted Lu Kang to the position of Senior General Who Guards the Army (鎮軍大將軍) and appointed him as the nominal Governor of Yi Province (益州牧) even though Yi Province was not Wu territory. After the Wu general Shi Ji died in 270, Sun Hao put Lu Kang in charge of overseeing military affairs in Xinling (信陵), Xiling (西陵), Yidao (夷道), Le District (樂鄉), and Gong'an counties, with his administrative centre at Le District (east of present-day Songzi, Hubei).

=== Proposing 17 policy changes ===
When Lu Kang heard that there were many flaws in the Wu government's policies, he became worried so he wrote a memorial to Sun Hao as follows:

"I heard that through promoting morality, the minority can become the majority, and through the conditioning of strengths, a dangerous situation can become a safe one. This was why Qin succeeded in unifying the other six states, and why Emperor Gao of Han managed to conquer Western Chu. We are now surrounded by enemies and we face more complex situations as compared to that during the Warring States period and the Treaty of Hong Canal. Our state has no allies outside; internally, it is not as strong as Western Chu was. Our policies are not effective and the people are not well governed. What I am suggesting is that we should not solely rely on our natural defences as these are final resorts and are not solutions that wise people would consider first. I often think of how the Seven Warring States ended and how the Han dynasty collapsed. Regardless of whether I read about such things from books or experienced danger myself, I am filled with worries and I cannot sleep well at night and have my meals in peace. In the past, when the Xiongnu had yet to be defeated, Huo Qubing refused to move house; when the Han dynasty was not stable yet, Jia Yi shed tears whenever he thought about it. The blood of the imperial clan runs in me and I have received much grace from the state. My personal fame and glory cannot be separated from those of the state's, so I should serve the state faithfully until I die. I cannot relax and I am always concerned about the state's well-being, to the point where I feel sorry for myself. To serve a ruler means to never deceive the ruler, even if I have to offend him. Being a subject of a state means to defend the state with my life. I humbly propose these 17 amendments to our policies as follows."

The 17 policy changes proposed by Lu Kang were lost over time.

=== Speaking up against corruption in the Wu government ===
When the official He Ding (何定) was abusing his authority and eunuchs were interfering in state affairs, Lu Kang wrote a memorial to advise Sun Hao:

"I heard that in order to establish a state and inherit the work of one's predecessors, one should not employ persons of vile character. The Canon of Yao cautioned against placing faith in those whose actions do not match their words. Learned people of the past abhor such behaviour while Confucius sighed and lamented when he spoke of this. Such villains existed throughout history, from the Spring and Autumn period to the Qin and Han dynasties, and they caused the downfalls of empires. They do not understand important principles and they have myopic views of the world. Even if they are nice to you and seem very conscientious, they should never be entrusted with important responsibilities. Besides, they cannot change their contemptible characters and they switch their allegiances very quickly. They constantly fear that they will lose what they possess, so they will often resort to unscrupulous means to defend their personal interests. If you intend to give them important appointments and much authority, and expect them to behave as role models and uphold morality, this is certainly impossible. Of all the current officials in the imperial court, not many of them are exemplary talents, but some of them come from affluent backgrounds and have been well-educated, while others of humble origins are hardworking and constantly striving for self-improvement, so their abilities should be tapped into. Incompetent officials should be dismissed, so that the government can be restructured and cleared of corruption."

== Battle of Xiling ==
=== Initial stages ===
In 272, Bu Chan, the military commander stationed at Xiling (西陵; around present-day Yichang, Hubei), started a rebellion against Wu and wanted to defect to the Jin dynasty. When Lu Kang received news of the revolt, he immediately ordered his subordinates Zuo Yi (左奕), Wu Yan, Cai Gong (蔡貢) and others to lead separate forces and head towards Xiling as directly as possible. He instructed his men to construct defensive structures all the way from Chixi (赤谿) to Gushi (故市) to form an encirclement around Bu Chan's position, while at the same time defending the area from attacks by Jin forces. He ordered them to work day and night to complete the construction works as if the enemy had already arrived, resulting in his soldiers being all tired and worn out.

Lu Kang's subordinates said: "With our current strength, we can attack Bu Chan and destroy him before Jin forces arrive. Why are we exhausting ourselves by constructing defensive structures instead?" Lu Kang explained: "Xiling's fortifications are very stable and it has sufficient supplies. Besides, I was the one who oversaw the construction of Xiling's defences. If we attack it now, I don't think we can conquer it easily. If Jin forces show up and we don't have adequate defensive structures, we will be trapped in between Bu Chan and Jin and have nothing to protect ourselves from the enemy." The officers repeatedly urged Lu Kang to attack Xiling but he refused. Eventually, Lei Tan (雷譚), the Administrator of Yidu Commandery, came to see Lu Kang and used kind words to persuade him to attack Xiling. To prove that he was right, Lu Kang relented and ordered an assault on Xiling. As he expected, they did not succeed in capturing the city, so his officers gave up their idea of attacking and complied with Lu Kang's orders to construct the defensive structures.

=== Destruction of the dyke near Jiangling ===
When Jin forces led by Yang Hu were approaching Jiangling County, the Wu officers advised Lu Kang against leaving Jiangling to attack Xiling, but Lu Kang said: "Jiangling's fortifications are strong and it has sufficient troops to defend it, so there is no need to worry. Even if the enemy captures Jiangling, they won't be able to hold it for long and our losses will be minimal. However, if we lose Xiling, the tribes in the southern hills will be affected and this will lead to serious problems. I'd rather abandon Jiangling than give up on capturing Xiling. Besides, Jiangling is already very well-defended in the first place."

Jiangling was situated on flat lands and was a very accessible location. However, Lu Kang later ordered Zhang Xian (張咸) to oversee the construction of a large dyke to block the river's flow and direct its waters to flood the flat lands, so as to create a large body of water around the city to serve as a barrier to invaders. When Yang Hu arrived, he planned to make use of this barrier by transporting supplies on boats, but he spread false news that he intended to destroy the dyke to make way for his land army to pass through. When Lu Kang heard that, he saw through Yang Hu's plot and ordered Zhang Xian to destroy the dyke. Lu Kang's officers were shocked and attempted to dissuade him from doing so because they thought he would be doing the enemy a favour, but Lu Kang ignored them. When Yang Hu reached Dangyang (當陽; southwest of present-day Jingmen, Hubei), he was dismayed to hear that the dyke had been destroyed. He had no choice but to transport his supplies on land, resulting in the wasting of time and effort.

=== Final stages ===
Xu Yin (徐胤), the commander of the Jin garrison at Badong Commandery (巴東郡; around present-day Fengjie County, Chongqing), led naval forces towards Jianping (建平; around present-day Zigui County, Hubei), while Yang Zhao (楊肇), the Inspector of Jing Province (also under Jin control), led troops towards Xiling.

Lu Kang gave orders that: Zhang Xian reinforce Jiangling's defences; Sun Zun (孫遵), the Commandant of Gong'an County, patrol the south river bank and resist Yang Hu; and Liu Lü (留慮) and Zhu Wan (朱琬) guard against Xu Yin's attacks. He personally led three armies to hold off Yang Zhao with the aid of the defensive structures they had constructed earlier. However, Lu Kang's subordinates Zhu Qiao (朱喬) and Yu Zan (俞贊) defected to Yang Zhao's side. Lu Kang said: "Yu Zan has been serving under me for a long time and he is very aware of my situation. He knows that the tribal soldiers in my army may be unwilling to follow my orders, so he will definitely suggest to the enemy to take advantage of this weakness." Hence, that night, Lu Kang immediately replaced the tribal soldiers in his army with other veteran soldiers whom he trusted more. The following day, as Lu Kang expected, Yang Zhao concentrated his attacks on the unit in Lu Kang's army which used to be made up of tribal soldiers, without knowing that they had been replaced. Lu Kang ordered his archers to retaliate, raining arrows on the enemy and inflicting heavy casualties.

After about a month, Yang Zhao failed to overcome Lu Kang and had run out of ideas, so he withdrew his army one night. Lu Kang wanted to pursue the enemy but he was worried that Bu Chan (who was still inside Xiling) might use the opportunity to attack him from behind, and he did not have enough troops with him. He ordered his men to beat the drums and pretend to prepare to attack Yang Zhao's retreating forces. When Yang Zhao's men saw that, they were so terrified that they abandoned their armour and equipment and fled. Lu Kang sent a small group of lightly armed soldiers to pursue Yang Zhao and they inflicted a crushing defeat on the enemy. Yang Hu and the other Jin generals withdrew their armies after receiving news of Yang Zhao's defeat. Lu Kang then attacked and conquered Xiling. Bu Chan, along with his family and high-ranking officers, were executed for treason, while the others, numbering over 10,000, were pardoned after Lu Kang made a request to the Wu court. Lu Kang then had Xiling's fortifications repaired before returning east to Le District (樂鄉; east of present-day Songzi, Hubei). He remained humble after his victory in Xiling and still behaved in the same manner as he did before. His humility earned him the respect and favour of his men.

== Making peace with Yang Hu ==
The Jin Yang Qiu (晉陽秋) recorded that Lu Kang was on friendly terms with the Jin general Yang Hu even though they stood on opposing sides. Their friendship was likened to that of Zichan and Jizha during the Spring and Autumn period. Lu Kang once sent wine to Yang Hu, who drank it without showing any signs of suspicion. Later, when Lu Kang fell sick, Yang Hu sent medicine to him, which Lu Kang also took without suspecting anything. The people of that time remarked that the relationship between Lu Kang and Yang Hu was like that of Hua Yuan and Zifan during the Spring and Autumn period.

The Han Jin Chunqiu (漢晉春秋) further described this uncanny friendship between Lu Kang and Yang Hu. After returning to Jin territory, Yang Hu started promoting morality and civility, and many Wu citizens were impressed with him. Lu Kang told the Wu forces stationed at the Wu-Jin border: "If they govern with virtue and we administer our state like tyrants, we will lose the war without even having to fight. I hope that you can guard the border well and not stir up problems over trivial matters."

The Wu-Jin border experienced peace and stability as both sides actively practised détente and got along harmoniously with each other. If cattle from one side accidentally strayed across the border, the other side would allow the owners to cross the border and retrieve their cattle. During hunting expeditions at the border, if the citizens of either side were injured, the other would send them home safely. When Lu Kang fell sick, he asked for medicine from Yang Hu. Yang Hu obliged and said: "This medicine is of fine quality. I prepared it myself. I haven't tried it myself when I heard that you are ill so I sent it to you." Lu Kang's subordinates cautioned him against taking Yang Hu's medicine because they were worried that Yang Hu might harm him, but Lu Kang ignored them. When the Wu emperor Sun Hao received news of peaceful relations between Wu and Jin, he sent a messenger to reprimand Lu Kang, but Lu Kang replied: "Ordinary peasants in the countryside have to keep their promises, much less me, a government official. If I do not live the virtues, I will appear as a stark contrast to Yang Hu. This does not result in any harm to Yang Hu." However, there were some people who disagreed with the behaviour of Lu Kang and Yang Hu, as they believed that the two men were not fulfilling their loyalties to their respective states.

=== Xi Zuochi's commentary ===
Xi Zuochi, author of the Han Jin Chunqiu, commented on this issue as follows:

"Those who are morally upright earn the protection of everyone, those who keep their promises win the respect of others. Even if one lives in a morally bankrupt society filled with treachery and villainy, he can still achieve something great by relying on his strength to overcome others despite having only the intelligence of a slave or a peasant. In the past: Duke Wen of Jin kept his promise and retreated, resulting in the surrender of Yuan; Muzi refused to accept the surrender of Gu and insisted on using military force to subdue it; Ye Fu proposed showing kindness to the people of Fei, leading to them surrendering of their own accord; Yue Yi treated refugees well and left his good name in history. Looking at these persons, did they achieve success by merely using military might and strategy to defeat their enemies?

The Empire had been divided into three for over 40 years. The people of Wu could not cross the Huai and Han rivers to attack the Central Plains, while those in the Central Plains were unable to venture beyond the Yangtze to invade Wu. This was because both sides were equally matched in terms of military and intellectual power. Instead of resorting to harming each other to make personal gains, why not improve themselves and not harm each other? Instead of terrorising each other with military force, why not win over the opposing side through virtuous deeds? A single man cannot be forced into submission by brute force, much less a state. Instead of intimidating others with military might, why not use morality and civility to win them over? In this way, can they not be persuaded to submit?

Yang Hu gave careful thought and decided to treat his enemies as well as he treated his own people. He used benevolence and kindness to overcome tyranny and cruelty in Wu, change the perceptions of people in Wu, and reduce their fighting spirit. In this way, he earned himself a good reputation for being kind and accepting towards his enemies. The people of Wu had probably never encountered a foe like him.

Lu Kang was aware that his lord was a tyrant, his state's foundation was weakening, and his people were starting to admire their rival state because of its benevolent policies and might even turn against their own state. After serious consideration, he decided to apply similar policies in Wu – maintaining peace within and at the borders of Wu, helping the poor and weak, oppose tyranny and corruption – in the hope of gaining an edge over his rival. He also hoped that he could set an example for others to follow by living the virtues himself, and spreading this way of life throughout his state and beyond. In this way, he could defeat the enemy without using military force, defend his state without relying on walls and defensive structures, and subdue the enemy by virtue. As such, he would not resort to cunning means to harm others so as to boost his personal reputation.

In conclusion, a single soldier can defend his country by being conservative; a villain uses superiority in numbers to bully others; a slave resorts to trickery to protect himself; a wise person considers using military force to achieve peace. Ancient sages and men of virtue became role models for later generations to follow because they sacrificed their personal interests to achieve the greater good and they had the moral high ground."

== Later career ==
=== Speaking up against cruel and harsh laws ===
After the Battle of Xiling, Lu Kang was promoted to Protector-General (都護). When he heard that Xue Ying, the Left Commandant of Wuchang, had been imprisoned, he wrote a memorial to Sun Hao:

"Talented persons are like rare gems and are important assets of the state. They are essential to the functioning of a government and the attraction of other talents from afar. Minister of Finance Lou Xuan, Central Regular Mounted Attendant Wang Fan, and Minister Steward Li Xu are talents of our time. Your Majesty recognised their talents and recruited them into the civil service, but they landed themselves in trouble so quickly. Some of them have their families implicated while others have been exiled to distant lands. However, the Rites of Zhou mentioned pardoning virtuous men for their misdoings while the Spring and Autumn Annals also emphasised the virtues of forgiveness. The Classic of History stated: 'Instead of killing innocent people by mistake, why not abandon the practice (of clan extermination)?' Besides, Wang Fan and the others have yet to be found guilty but they have already been executed. Is it not agonising to watch a loyal and righteous person being executed in a torturous manner? Those who are dead can no longer feel anything but yet their bodies are still set on fire and the ashes dumped into the rivers (instead of being properly buried). This practice was not considered orthodox by ancient rulers, and was something the Marquis of Fu abhorred. Both the people and the soldiers express grief and sorrow over this. Wang Fan and Li Xu are already dead, so it is too late for regrets. I sincerely hope that Your Majesty can pardon and release Lou Xuan, but I also heard that Xue Ying has been thrown into prison. Xue Ying's father Xue Zong served the Late Emperor and Xue Ying himself has inherited his father's fame and made some achievements, so he should be pardoned. I am worried that the judicial officers do not investigate the case thoroughly and end up killing innocents and disappointing the masses. I beg Your Majesty to pardon Xue Ying and relax our laws. This is beneficial to our state!"

=== Advising Sun Hao against waging war on Jin ===
When battles were constantly waged between Wu and Jin and the people were suffering in those times of war, Lu Kang wrote another memorial to Sun Hao:

"I heard that the Yijing mentioned that it is remarkable if one can adapt to changes in the times and notice others' flaws. Hence, Tang of Shang rose up against the corrupt Xia dynasty, and King Wu of Zhou overthrew the tyrannical Di Xin. If they did not (adapt to changes in the times), Di Xin would feel uneasy when he was making merry on the Jade Platform, and the army of King Wu of Zhou would retreat at Meng Ford. Now, Your Majesty does not focus on strengthening the military, making the state more prosperous, or promoting agriculture. All the officials cannot perform their duties, the civil service system is in disorder, and the people cannot be at peace. Your Majesty should be more discerning in giving out rewards and punishments, promote moral values among the officials, rule the state with benevolence, and then follow Heaven's will and unite the Empire. Your Majesty should not allow the officials to behave lawlessly, actively wage war against Jin, and use the imperial treasury's reserves for your personal pleasures. The soldiers are weary, the enemy has not become weaker, and I am seriously ill. Your Majesty should not pursue policies suggested by villainous officials for the sake of making minor gains. In the past, the states of Qi and Lu fought three battles and Lu won two, but was conquered by Qi eventually. Why? That was because Lu was unable to accurately assess its position in the war. Now, our forces may have scored some victories but our gains are not sufficient to compensate for our losses. It is written clearly in historical texts that the people hate war. I sincerely hope that Your Majesty can follow the advice of the ancients, stop the war, focus on rest and recuperation, and look out for the enemy's weaknesses. If not, Your Majesty will regret later."

=== Final advice to Sun Hao ===
In 273, Lu Kang was appointed as Grand Marshal (大司馬) and Governor of Jing Province (荊州牧). He fell sick in the summer of 274. During that time, he wrote a memorial to Sun Hao:

"Xiling and Jianping are the borders of our state as they are located downstream and are facing the enemy on two sides. If the enemy sends a naval fleet to sail along the river at godspeed, they will arrive at our gates very quickly and it will be too late to call for reinforcements from other areas by then. This is critical to the survival of our state and is much more serious as compared to losing a small piece of land at the border. My late father, who was stationed at the western border, once said that Xiling was the west gateway into our state, and that it was easy to defend but could also be easily lost. If we do not strengthen our defences at Xiling, we will not only lose one commandery, but also the entire Jing Province as well. If Xiling comes under attack, Your Majesty must mobilise all available forces in the state to reinforce Xiling. During my service in Xiling these years, I came to realise what my late father meant. Earlier on, I asked for 30,000 elite troops but the officials in charge refused to answer my request. Bu Chan's rebellion has taken quite a toll on Xiling. Now, I am in charge of thousands of li of lands and I am surrounded by enemies on all sides — our powerful nemesis (Jin) outside and various tribes inside — and I only have a few ten thousands troops with me. They are weary from fighting wars over a long period of time and may not be able to adapt to sudden changes in the situation. In my humble opinion, I feel that all the princes are still very young and have yet to be involved in state affairs, so Your Majesty can appoint advisors to tutor and guide them. Some of their personal guards can be reassigned to be reserve soldiers instead. I also heard that many eunuchs are secretly recruiting personal militias, and many men have joined these militias to avoid conscription. I suggest that Your Majesty issue an order for a thorough investigation, so as to catch all these draft dodgers and send them to those areas lacking manpower. In this way, I can muster 80,000 troops, allow my current men to relax, and be fairer in terms of giving out rewards and punishments. If not, even if Han Xin and Bai Qi were to return from the dead, they cannot help in resolving this crisis. If I do not have sufficient troops under my command, I have no confidence that I can fulfil my duty well. If I die, I hope that Your Majesty can pay closer attention to the western border. I sincerely wish that Your Majesty can accept and consider my advice. In this way, I will not have died in vain."

== Descendants ==
Lu Kang died in the autumn of 274 sometime between 20 August and 17 September. His son, Lu Yan (陸晏), inherited his titles. Lu Yan and his younger brothers – Lu Jing (陸景), Lu Xuan (陸玄), Lu Ji (陸機) and Lu Yun (陸雲) – shared command of their father's troops and served as generals in Wu. Lu Kang also had another son, Lu Dan (陸耽), who was younger than Lu Yun.

Lu Yan was commissioned as a Major-General (裨將軍) and he served as the commander of Yidao (夷道). In 280, the Jin dynasty launched a campaign against Eastern Wu. The Jin general Wang Jun led a naval fleet and sailed east towards Wu along the Yangtze River, capturing all the Wu territories along the way, just as Lu Kang had foreseen when he urged Sun Hao to strengthen the defences on Wu's western border. Lu Yan was killed in a battle against Wang Jun's forces on 22 March 280.

Lu Jing served as a general in Wu and was also killed in action during the Jin conquest of Wu. Lu Ji, Lu Yun and Lu Dan all came to serve the Jin dynasty after the fall of Wu. They were all executed along with their families during the War of the Eight Princes.

== Appraisal ==
Chen Shou, who wrote Lu Kang's biography in the Sanguozhi, commented on Lu Kang as follows: "Lu Kang was loyal and faithful to his state, and was very capable and talented, much like his father. He had excellent moral conduct worthy of praise. He was also able to handle the overall situation well without neglecting details. He was thus able to accomplish such great tasks!"

== See also ==
- Lists of people of the Three Kingdoms
