= Pei Xuan (Three Kingdoms) =

Chinese scholar

Pei Xuan (Chinese: 裴玄), courtesy name Yanhuang (Chinese: 彥黃), was a Chinese scholar who lived in the state of Eastern Wu. He was from Xiapi. He served in Sun Quan's court as superior grand master of the palace (太中大夫), and collaborated with Yan Jun and Zhang Cheng on Confucian and Legalist texts. He held a position in the government of Jing Province until about 230.

Pei was the author of the five-scroll Syncretist text Peishi xinyan (Chinese: 裴氏新言; lit. 'New words of Master Pei'). It was lost sometime before the Tang dynasty. The Qing dynasty scholar Ma Guohan (馬國翰) collected eight of the text's surviving fragments, with Huang Yizhou (黃以周) adding several more paragraphs. Their collection was published by Wang Renjun (王仁俊) in the Yuhan shanfang jiyi shu xubian, a supplementary reprint series to the Yuhan shanfang ji yishu.
