= Yan Jun =

3rd century official of the state of Eastern Wu

- 嚴畯

Prefect of the Masters of Writing (尚書令)
- In office ?–?
- Monarch: Sun Quan

Minister of the Guards (衞尉)
- In office 229 – ?
- Monarch: Sun Quan

Personal details
- Born: Unknown Xuzhou, Jiangsu
- Died: Unknown
- Children: Yan Kai; Yan Shuang
- Occupation: Official
- Courtesy name: Mancai (曼才)

Yan Jun (fl. 200s–240s), courtesy name Mancai, was an official of the state of Eastern Wu during the Three Kingdoms period of China.

== Life ==
Yan Jun was from Pengcheng (彭城), which is present-day Xuzhou, Jiangsu. He was known for being very studious since he was young and was well versed in Confucian classics. When chaos broke out in central China towards the end of the Han dynasty, he migrated to the Jiangdong region in southern China, where he met and befriended other famous scholars such as Zhuge Jin and Bu Zhi. He was known for being sincere, honest and committed to everything he did.

Sometime in the third century, Zhang Zhao recommended Yan Jun to serve under the warlord Sun Quan, who controlled the territories in Jiangdong. Sun Quan appointed him as a Cavalry Commandant (騎都尉) and Assistant Officer (從事中郎). When Sun Quan's general Lu Su died in 217, Sun Quan wanted to let Yan Jun replace Lu and take charge of the military garrison at Lukou (陸口; around present-day Jiayu County, Hubei). The other officials congratulated Yan Jun on his new appointment, but Yan Jun firmly declined and said: "I am only a simple scholar and I am unfamiliar with military affairs. If I take up this appointment which I am not suited for, there will be regrets later." He spoke very sincerely – to the point of breaking down in tears. Sun Quan then asked him to try riding on a horse, but he fell off after getting onto horseback, so Sun Quan decided to not let him replace Lu Su. Yan Jun received praise for being candid about his abilities.

In 229, after Sun Quan declared himself emperor and established the state of Eastern Wu, he appointed Yan Jun as Minister of the Guards (衞尉) and sent him as an emissary to Wu's ally state, Shu Han. In Shu, Yan Jun met and received high praise from Zhuge Liang, the chancellor of Shu. He was known for being generous as he did not keep the gifts and rewards he received from others and instead distributed them among his relatives and close friends.

Sun Quan once asked Yan Jun to recite something he memorised in his childhood. Yan Jun thus recited "The Scope and Meaning of the Treatise", the opening paragraph of the Classic of Filial Piety. Zhang Zhao, who was also present, remarked: "Yan Jun is a mediocre scholar. I humbly seek permission to recite for Your Majesty." After Sun Quan approved, Zhang Zhao recited "The Service of the Ruler", another paragraph in the Classic of Filial Piety. Sun Quan's other subjects agreed that Zhang Zhao had a good understanding of what he should recite in front of the emperor.

Liu Ying (劉穎), a scholar from Guangling Commandery (around present-day Huai'an, Jiangsu), was an old friend of Yan Jun. Sun Quan heard about Liu Ying's talent and wanted to recruit him but Liu Ying claimed that he was sick and declined the offer. Not long later, Liu Ying's younger brother, Liu Lue (劉略), died in office while serving as the Administrator of Lingling Commandery (零陵郡; around present-day Yongzhou, Hunan), so Liu Ying travelled to Lingling to attend the funeral. Sun Quan concluded that Liu Ying lied about his illness, so he ordered Liu Ying's arrest. When Yan Jun heard about it, he rushed to Lingling to inform Liu Ying and brought Liu Ying along to meet Sun Quan and apologise. Sun Quan was so furious that he dismissed Yan Jun from office. He spared Liu Ying, however.

After some time, Sun Quan recalled Yan Jun back to service and appointed him as the Prefect of the Masters of Writing (尚書令). It is not known when Yan Jun died, But the Wu Shu (吳書; Book of Wu) recorded that he died at the age of 78 (by East Asian age reckoning). He was survived by two sons: Yan Kai (嚴凱) and Yan Shuang (嚴爽). Yan Kai also served in the Wu government, and his highest appointment was Minister Steward (升平少府).

Yan Jun wrote two books – Xiao Jing Zhuan (孝經傳) and Chao Shui Lun (潮水論). His discussions with Pei Xuan (裴玄) and Zhang Cheng on the historical figures Guan Zhong and Ji Lu were also spread around.

== See also ==
- Lists of people of the Three Kingdoms
