= Pingfu tie =

Calligraphy by Lu Ji

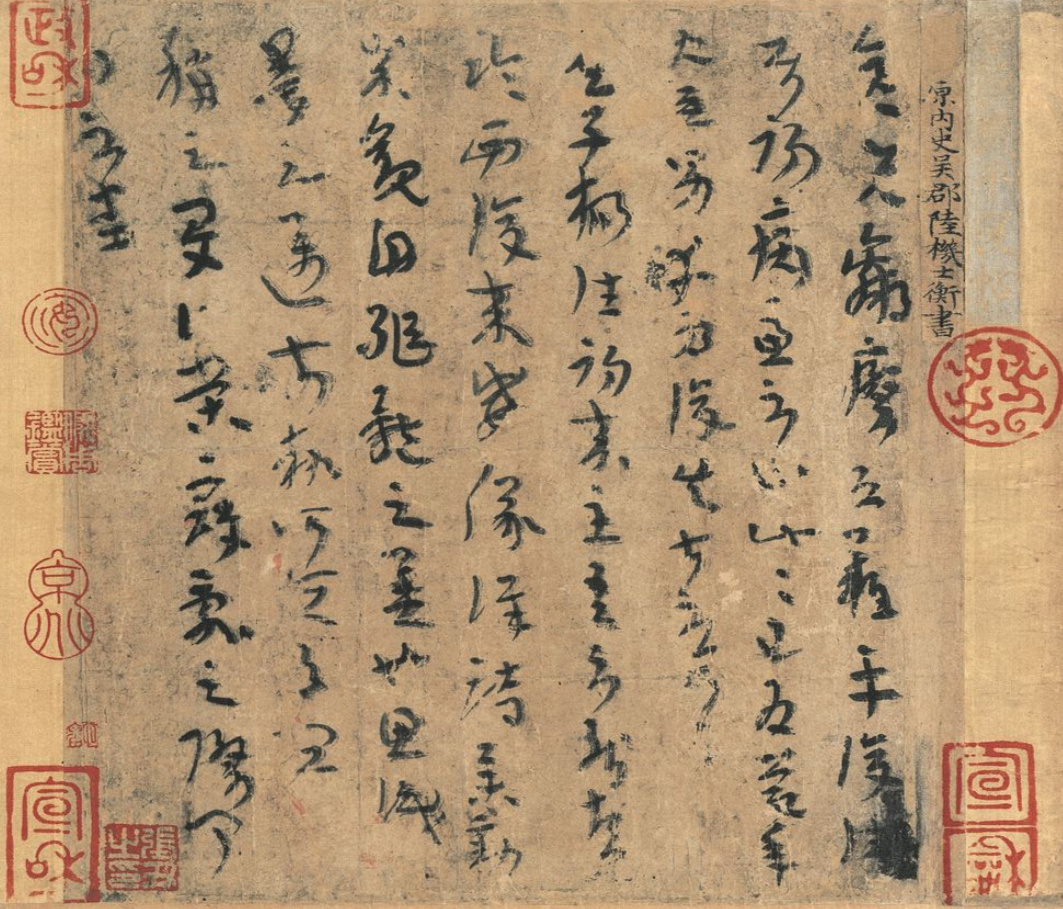
A close up on the Pingfu tie by Lu Ji, housed in the Palace Museum, in Beijing, China

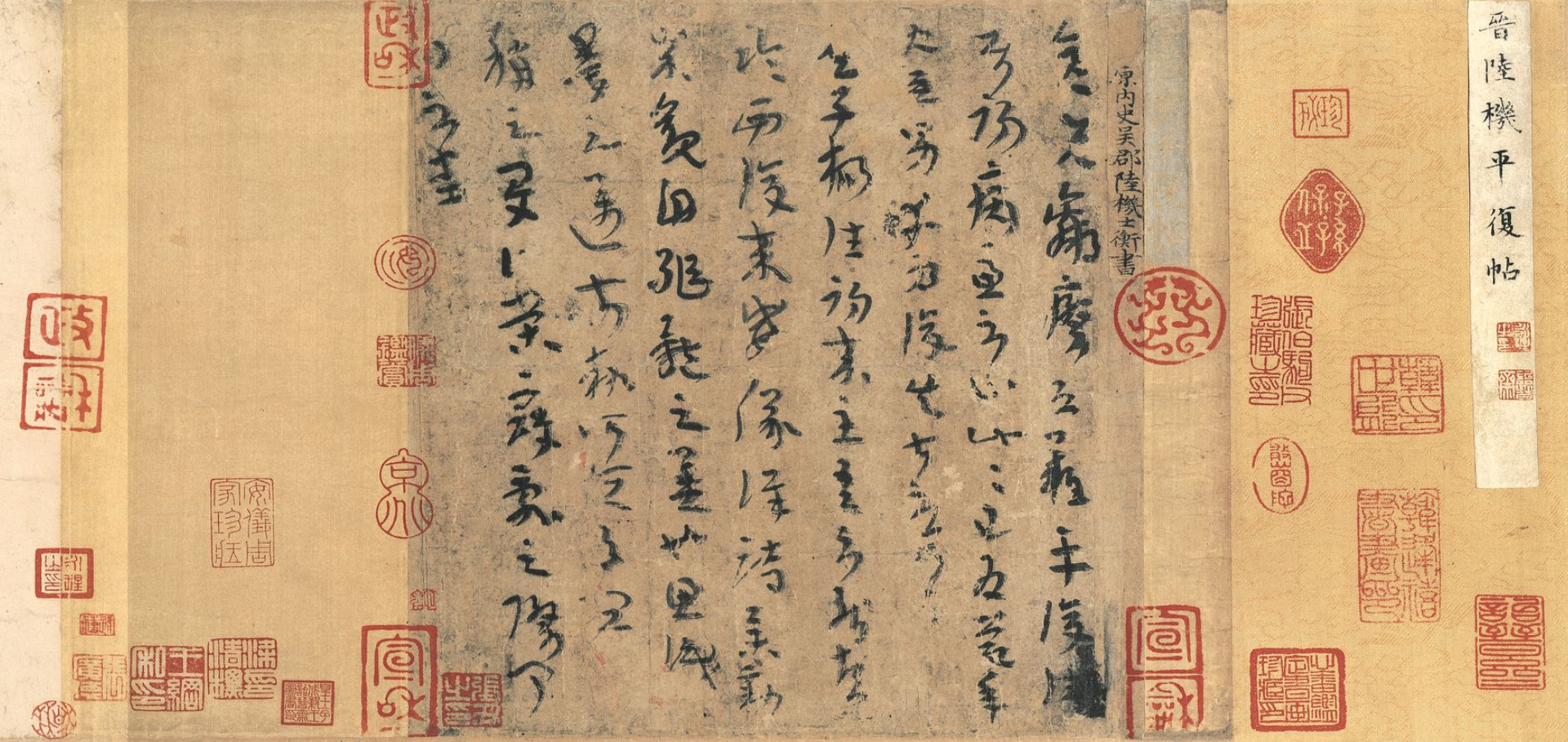
The Pingfu tie by Lu Ji, housed in the Palace Museum

The Pingfu tie (simplified Chinese: 平复帖; traditional Chinese: 平復帖), also spelled as Pingfutie or Ping Fu Tie, is a work of calligraphy on paper by Lu Ji (261–303 CE). It is widely recognized as the oldest extant Chinese calligraphic masterwork in the world, or more precisely, the oldest surviving piece of Chinese calligraphy written by a well-known master himself. (Note: Although there are prior extant Chinese calligraphic writings on other mediums (other than paper), Pingfu tie is recognized as the earliest calligraphy as an actual masterpiece. And although there are many recorded Chinese calligraphers existed before Lu Ji, such as Li Si, Cai Yong, Zhang Zhi, and Zhong Yao, etc., Lu Ji's Pingfu tie is widely known as the oldest authentic work that is by the master calligrapher himself. It is also different than many other famous Jin dynasty calligraphic works such as the Lantingji Xu by Wang Xizhi, which survives only in faithful copies by later artists.)

This calligraphic artwork, which is over 1,700 years old, is now housed in the permanent collection of the Palace Museum in the Forbidden City in Beijing, China. It is only showcased once every 5 years.
