= Zhang Fan (Han dynasty) =

Chinese official serving Cao Cao (died 212)

- 張範

Army Adviser (參軍) (under Cao Cao)
- In office 209 – 212

Consultant (議郎)
- In office 209 – 212
- Monarch: Emperor Xian of Han
- Chancellor: Cao Cao

Personal details
- Born: Unknown Huojia County, Henan
- Died: 212
- Relations: Zhang Xin (grandfather); Zhang Cheng (brother); Zhang Zhao (brother)
- Children: Zhang Ling; Zhang Shen
- Parent: Zhang Yan (father)
- Occupation: Official
- Courtesy name: Gongyi (公儀)

Zhang Fan (died 212), courtesy name Gongyi, was an official serving under the warlord Cao Cao during the late Eastern Han dynasty of China. A generous man who tended to reject service, with his younger brothers serving instead, he was charged with the care of Cao Cao's eldest son when Cao Cao was on campaign.

== Life ==
Zhang Fan was born in the Eastern Han dynasty in Xiuwu County (脩武縣), Henei Commandery (河內郡), which is present-day Huojia County, Henan. His grandfather, Zhang Xin (張歆), served as Minister over the Masses (司徒) in the Han imperial court, while his father, Zhang Yan (張延), served as Grand Commandant (太尉) but was jailed after accusations by eunuchs in 186 and died. Yuan Wei (袁隗), the Grand Tutor (太傅), wanted to arrange for his daughter to marry Zhang Fan, but Zhang Fan declined despite this being a chance to tie himself to one of the two pre-eminent families of the Han dynasty.

Zhang Fan desired a quiet, peaceful and happy life. As he had little regard for fame and material wealth, he rejected offers and invitations to serve in the Han government. The historian Rafe De Crespigny does note his refusal to serve may have also been connected to the death of his father at the hands of the eunuchs. He had two younger brothers, Zhang Cheng and Zhang Zhao (張昭). (Note: This Zhang Zhao (張昭) was not the same person as the similarly named but better known Zhang Zhao (張昭) who served as consultants at court.) Around 190, Zhang Fan's brothers fled the court to their brother then the family relocated to Yang Province after the warlord Dong Zhuo seized control of the Han central government and held the figurehead Emperor Xian hostage.

In the 190s, the warlord Yuan Shu controlled the lands around the Huai River in Yang Province. He had heard of Zhang Fan and wanted to recruit him as an adviser. However, Zhang Fan claimed that he was ill and refused to go so sent his brother Zhang Cheng to meet Yuan Shu instead, though that meeting did not go well.

Around 207, after the warlord Cao Cao had defeated his rivals in northern China and unified the region under his control, he sent a messenger to invite Zhang Fan to serve in the Han government. However, Zhang Fan claimed that he was ill and remained behind in Pengcheng (彭城; around present-day Xuzhou, Jiangsu). He sent his brother Zhang Cheng to meet Cao Cao instead.

On one occasion, Zhang Fan's son Zhang Ling (張陵) and nephew Zhang Jian (張戩; Zhang Cheng's son) were kidnapped by bandits in Shandong. When Zhang Fan asked them to release the boys, they freed only Zhang Ling. Zhang Fan then asked them if he could trade his son for his nephew instead because his nephew was younger. The bandits were so impressed by his act of sacrifice that they released both Zhang Ling and Zhang Jian.

In 209, after Cao Cao returned from defeat at the Battle of Red Cliffs, he met Zhang Fan in Chen Commandery (陳郡; around present-day Huaiyang County, Henan) and appointed him as a Consultant (議郎) and Army Adviser (參軍). Cao Cao highly regarded Zhang Fan and treated him respectfully. When he went on military campaigns against rival warlords, he often left Zhang Fan and the honourable scholar Bing Yuan behind to guard his base together with his son and heir apparent, Cao Pi. He also once told Cao Pi, "You should consult these two men before you do anything." Cao Pi heeded his father's advice and treated them as if they were the elders of his family.

Zhang Fan kept no surplus wealth for himself and his family. He generously used his personal wealth to help the poor and needy, and provided shelter for many widows and orphans. He neither rejected the gifts he received from others nor used them, and instead kept them somewhere. After he died in 212, his family returned the gifts in accordance with his final wishes.

== Family ==
In late 220, more than half a year after Cao Cao's death, Cao Pi usurped the throne from Emperor Xian, ended the Eastern Han dynasty, and established the Cao Wei state with himself as the new emperor. After his coronation, Cao Pi appointed one of Zhang Fan's sons, Zhang Shen (張參; or Zhang Can), as a Palace Gentleman (郎中). Apart from Zhang Shen, Zhang Fan was known to have at least one other son, Zhang Ling (張陵).

== See also ==
- Lists of people of the Three Kingdoms
