= Zhang Zhao (Eastern Wu) =

Chinese calligrapher, essayist and general (156–236)

- 張昭
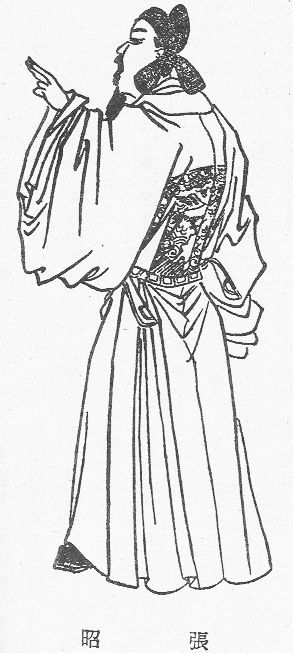
- A Qing dynasty illustration of Zhang Zhao

General Who Assists Wu (輔吳將軍)
- In office 229 – 236
- Monarch: Sun Quan
- Chancellor: Gu Yong

General Who Pacifies Distant Lands (綏遠將軍)
- In office 221 – 229
- Monarch: Sun Quan
- Chancellor: Sun Shao (222-225); Gu Yong (from 225)

Army Adviser (軍師) (under Sun Quan)
- In office c. 209 – 220
- Monarch: Emperor Xian of Han
- Chancellor: Cao Cao

Chief Clerk (長史) (under Sun Quan)
- In office 200 – c. 209
- Monarch: Emperor Xian of Han

General of the Household Who Pacifies the Army (撫軍中郎將) (under Sun Ce)
- In office 190s – 200
- Monarch: Emperor Xian of Han

Chief Clerk (長史) (under Sun Ce)
- In office 190s – 200
- Monarch: Emperor Xian of Han

Personal details
- Born: 156 Xuzhou, Jiangsu
- Died: 236 (aged 80)
- Children: Zhang Cheng; Zhang Xiu
- Occupation: Calligrapher, essayist, military general, politician
- Courtesy name: Zibu (子布)
- Posthumous name: Marquis Wen (文侯)
- Peerage: Marquis of Lou (婁侯)

Zhang Zhao (Note: not to be confused with the similarly-named brother of Zhang Cheng and Zhang Fan) (156–236), courtesy name Zibu, was a Chinese calligrapher, essayist, military general, and politician. He served as an official of the state of Eastern Wu during the Three Kingdoms period of China. Born in the late Eastern Han dynasty, Zhang Zhao started his career as a scholar in his native Xu Province before the chaos towards the end of the Eastern Han dynasty forced him to flee south to the Jiangdong (or Wu) region for shelter. In Jiangdong, Zhang Zhao became an adviser to the rising warlord Sun Ce. After Sun Ce's death in the year 200, Zhang Zhao played a key supporting role to Sun Ce's younger brother and successor, Sun Quan, as he consolidated power and his control over the Jiangdong territories. In 208, Zhang Zhao strongly urged Sun Quan to surrender to Cao Cao, a rival warlord, because he believed that they stood no chance against an impending invasion by Cao Cao. However, Sun Quan refused to listen to Zhang Zhao and instead heeded the advice of Lu Su and Zhou Yu. Sun Quan's forces ultimately scored a decisive victory over Cao Cao at the Battle of Red Cliffs in the winter of 208. From 200 until his death in 236, Zhang Zhao served under Sun Quan through the collapse of the Eastern Han dynasty and into the Three Kingdoms period after Sun Quan became the founding emperor of the Eastern Wu state. Throughout his career, Zhang Zhao was known for being a stern, uncompromising and intimidating figure who commanded respect from both his colleagues and Sun Quan. Despite Zhang Zhao's seniority and experience, Sun Quan passed him over twice as a candidate for the position of Imperial Chancellor in 222 and 225 as he believed that Zhang Zhao was so headstrong and stubborn that he would not be able to effectively lead the administration. Nevertheless, Sun Quan paid his due respects to Zhang Zhao as a mentor-like figure who saw him through his formative years to his accession to the throne.

== Early life ==
Zhang Zhao was born in the late Eastern Han dynasty in the Pengcheng State (彭城國), a principality in Xu Province centred around present-day Xuzhou, Jiangsu. (Note: (張昭字子布，彭城人也。) Sanguozhi vol. 52.) As a youth, he was known for being diligent in his studies and for specialising in the clerical script style of calligraphy. He studied the Zuo zhuan and Chunqiu under the tutelage of Bohou Zi'an (白侯子安), and was known for being well read in history. He was also a close friend of two other well-known scholars, Zhao Yu (趙昱) and Wang Lang. (Note: (少好學，善隷書，從白侯子安受左氏春秋，博覽衆書，與琅邪趙昱、東海王朗俱發名友善。) Sanguozhi vol. 52.)

When Zhang Zhao reached the age of adulthood around 19, he was nominated as a xiaolian (civil service candidate) to serve in the government. However, he declined the offer and chose to join Wang Lang in compiling an essay on the ancient use of taboo names. They received praise from other Xu Province scholars, such as Chen Lin, for their work. (Note: (弱冠察孝廉，不就，與朗共論舊君諱事，州里才士陳琳等皆稱善之。) Sanguozhi vol. 52.) The essay contradicted the arguments of Ying Shao, another celebrated scholar from Runan Commandery (汝南郡; around present-day central Henan). (Note: (時汝南主簿應劭議宜為舊君諱，論者皆互有異同，事在風俗通。) Pei Songzhi's annotation in Sanguozhi vol. 52.)

Sometime later, when Tao Qian, the Governor of Xu Province, nominated Zhang Zhao as a maocai (茂才; outstanding candidate) to serve in the government, Zhang Zhao declined the offer again. Tao Qian perceived Zhang Zhao's rejection as an insult, so he ordered the latter's arrest. However, Zhao Yu, who was serving in Tao Qian's administration at the time, managed to convince the governor to pardon Zhang Zhao. (Note: (刺史陶謙舉茂才，不應，謙以為輕己，遂見拘執。[赵]昱傾身營救，方以得免。) Sanguozhi vol. 52.) (Note: Despite this incident, Zhang still wrote a eulogy for Tao when the latter died. This eulogy was recorded in Wu Shu, and was cited by Pei Songzhi when he annotated Tao's biography in Sanguozhi.)

== Service under Sun Ce ==
When chaos broke out throughout China in the 190s, many people living in Xu Province fled their homes and crossed the Yangtze River to take shelter in Yang Province (or the Jiangdong region) in the south. Zhang Zhao followed suit and moved from Pengcheng State to Jiangdong. (Note: (漢末大亂，徐方士民多避難揚土，昭皆南渡江。) Sanguozhi vol. 52.)

Between 194 and 199, the warlord Sun Ce conquered the territories in Jiangdong and established his own regime in the region. During this time, he heard of Zhang Zhao and wanted to recruit him as an adviser. After Zhang Zhao agreed and joined him, he was so delighted that he told Zhang Zhao: "Now that I have expanded my domain in all the four corners, I should treat learned and virtuous men with the utmost respect. I won't treat you in any degrading manner." He then appointed Zhang Zhao as a Colonel (校尉) and honoured him like a teacher. (Note: (吳書曰：策得昭甚恱，謂曰：「吾方有事四方，以士人賢者上，吾於子不得輕矣。」乃上為校尉，待以師友之禮。) Wu Shu annotation Sanguozhi vol. 52.)

Later on, Sun Ce made Zhang Zhao his Chief Clerk (長史) and promoted him from Colonel to General of the Household Who Pacifies the Army (撫軍中郎將). Apart from paying his respects to Zhang Zhao's mother and treating Zhang Zhao like an old friend, Sun Ce also consulted Zhang Zhao on various matters related to civil and military policy. (Note: (孫策創業，命昭為長史、撫軍中郎將，升堂拜母，如比肩之舊，文武之事，一以委昭。) Sanguozhi vol. 52.)

=== Receiving flattering letters ===
While serving under Sun Ce, Zhang Zhao received several flattering letters from his fellow literati in the north. He faced a dilemma on how to deal with those letters. On one hand, he was afraid that if he kept quiet about those letters, Sun Ce would start questioning his loyalty. On the other hand, he was also worried that others would scorn him for being boastful if he revealed the letters. (Note: (昭每得北方士大夫書疏，專歸美於昭，昭欲嘿而不宣則懼有私，宣之則恐非宜，進退不安。) Sanguozhi vol. 52.)

When Sun Ce found out, he laughed and told Zhang Zhao: "In the past, when Guan Zhong was the chancellor of Qi, he was called zhongfu. (Note: Zhongfu (仲父) was a term used by Chinese rulers to address senior officials whom they highly respected. See the dictionary definition of 仲父.) With his help, Duke Huan of Qi became a hegemon among the feudal lords. Today, as I have a virtuous talent like Zibu to assist me, isn't his glory also mine?" (Note: (策聞之，歡笑曰：「昔管子相齊，一則仲父，二則仲父，而桓公為霸者宗。今子布賢，我能用之，其功名獨不在我乎！」) Sanguozhi vol. 52.)

=== Sun Ce entrusting Sun Quan to Zhang Zhao's care ===
In the year 200, before Sun Ce died, he entrusted his younger brother and successor, Sun Quan, to Zhang Zhao's care. He told Zhang Zhao: "If Zhongmou turns out to be incompetent, you may replace him. If there is no way to overcome the difficulties, you can gradually retreat back to the west (Note: The "west" here refers to the areas north of the Yangtze River in present-day Anhui and Jiangsu provinces that were called "Jiangxi" (江西; literally "west of the river") during the Han dynasty. Sun Ce was based in the Jiangxi region before he conquered the territories in the Jiangdong region.) where you will have no worries." (Note: (吳歷曰：策謂昭曰：「若仲謀不任事者，君便自取之。正復不克捷，緩步西歸，亦無所慮。」) Wu Li annotation Sanguozhi vol. 52.)

After Sun Ce's death, Zhang Zhao led all of Sun Ce's former subjects to support Sun Quan and pledge their allegiance to him. (Note: (策臨亡，以弟權託昭，昭率羣僚立而輔之。) Sanguozhi vol. 52.) Zhang Zhao also wrote a memorial to the Han central government to inform them about Sun Ce's death and that Sun Quan had succeeded his brother. He also wrote to all the key appointment holders throughout Sun Quan's domain to order them to continue performing their duties as before. (Note: (上表漢室，下移屬城，中外將校，各令奉職。) Sanguozhi vol. 52.)

== Service under Sun Quan ==
=== Assisting Sun Quan in consolidating power ===
When an 18-year-old Sun Quan first came to power, he was so overwhelmed with grief over his brother's death that he spent his time mourning instead of taking charge of the regime established by his brother in Jiangdong. Zhang Zhao told him:

"As you are a successor to someone, it is important for you to inherit your predecessor's legacy, expand it and bring greater glory to it. As of now, the Empire is in a state of chaos and bandits are rampant in the hills. Xiaolian, (Note: Sun Quan was still a xiaolian (civil service candidate) when he first succeeded his brother Sun Ce. (Note: (郡察孝廉，州舉茂才，行奉義校尉。 ... [建安]五年，[孫]策薨，以事授[孫]權，權哭未及息。) Sanguozhi vol. 47.)) how can you remain in bed and occupy yourself with grief when you can't afford the luxury of time for such behaviour like any other person?" (Note: (權悲感未視事，昭謂權曰：「夫為人後者，貴能負荷先軌，克昌堂構，以成勳業也。方今天下鼎沸，羣盜滿山，孝廉何得寢伏哀戚，肆匹夫之情哉？」) Sanguozhi vol. 52.)

Sun Quan's biography in the Sanguozhi recorded that Zhang Zhao told the young Sun Quan:

"Xiaolian, is this the time for crying? When the Duke of Zhou set the rules for a funeral, his son Bo Qin didn't follow them. It wasn't because he wanted to defy his father, but because it didn't suit the circumstances at the time. Now, when many treacherous figures are fighting for power and villains control the government, you are occupying yourself with grief and blindly adhering to rites without realising that you are actually opening your gates wide for enemies to enter. This won't help you achieve the greater good." (Note: (策長史張昭謂權曰：「孝廉，此寧哭時邪？且周公立法而伯禽不師，非欲違父，時不得行也。況今姦宄競逐，豺狼滿道，乃欲哀親戚，顧禮制，是猶開門而揖盜，未可以為仁也。」) Sanguozhi vol. 47.)

Sun Quan heeded Zhang Zhao's advice. He changed out of his mourning attire, got onto horseback with Zhang Zhao's help, and inspected his troops as they assembled in formation. (Note: (乃改易權服，扶令上馬，使出巡軍。) Sanguozhi vol. 47.) Sun Ce's former subjects accepted Sun Quan's leadership and pledged their allegiance to him. Sun Quan also appointed Zhang Zhao as his Chief Clerk (長史) and ordered him to perform the same duties as he did under Sun Ce. (Note: (乃身自扶權上馬，陳兵而出，然後衆心知有所歸。昭復為權長史，授任如前。) Sanguozhi vol. 52.)

With Zhang Zhao's assistance, Sun Quan managed to consolidate his control over the unstable Jiangdong regime left behind by Sun Ce. Apart from pacifying and winning over the people, he also recruited many talented and capable persons to serve in his administration. (Note: (吳書曰：是時天下分裂，擅命者衆。孫策蒞事日淺，恩澤未洽，一旦傾隕，士民狼狽，頗有同異。及昭輔權，綏撫百姓，諸侯賔旅寄寓之士，得用自安。) Wu Shu annotation Sanguozhi vol. 52.) Whenever Sun Quan went into battle, he left Zhang Zhao behind to guard his base and oversee day-to-day affairs in the Jiangdong territories. During this time, Zhang Zhao suppressed an uprising by remnants of the Yellow Turban rebels. (Note: (權每出征，留昭鎮守，領幕府事。後黃巾賊起，昭討平之。) Wu Shu annotation Sanguozhi vol. 52.)

=== Battle of Jiangxia ===
In the spring of 208, Gan Ning, who had recently joined Sun Quan, pointed out to Sun Quan that Cao Cao, the warlord who controlled the Han central government and most of northern China, was planning to attack Jing Province (covering present-day Hubei and Hunan) to the west of the Jiangdong (or Wu) territories. He also noted that Liu Biao, the Governor of Jing Province, was incapable of defending his domain, so it would be better for Sun Quan to seize Jing Province before Cao Cao could do so. The first step in Gan Ning's plan was to attack Jiangxia Commandery (江夏郡; around present-day Wuhan, Hubei), which was guarded by Liu Biao's subordinate Huang Zu. (Note: (寧陳計曰：「今漢祚日微，曹操彌憍，終為篡盜。南荊之地，山陵形便，江川流通，誠是國之西勢也。寧已觀劉表，慮旣不遠，兒子又劣，非能承業傳基者也。至尊當早規之，不可後操圖之。圖之之計，宜先取黃祖。祖今年老，昏耄已甚，財穀並乏，左右欺弄，務於貨利，侵求吏士，吏士心怨，舟船戰具頓廢不脩，怠於耕農，軍無法伍。至尊今往，其破可必。一破祖軍，鼓行而西，西據楚關，大勢彌廣，即可漸規巴蜀。」) Sanguozhi vol. 55.)

Sun Quan approved Gan Ning's plan, but Zhang Zhao strongly objected and said: "The territories in Wu have not been completely pacified yet. If we proceed with this campaign, I am afraid there will be chaos." (Note: (權深納之。張昭時在坐，難曰：「吳下業業，若軍果行，恐必致亂。」) Sanguozhi vol. 55.) Gan Ning rebuked Zhang Zhao: "Our lord has entrusted responsibilities to you as if you were Xiao He. (Note: Xiao He was the first chancellor of the Han dynasty. When Liu Bang, the founding emperor of the Han dynasty, was away at war with his rivals, Xiao He served as a regent in Liu Bang's home territories and ensured the smooth delivery of supplies and reinforcements to Liu Bang's forces at the frontline.) If you can't even be confident that there won't be chaos under your watch, how can you expect to be like Xiao He?" (Note: (寧謂昭曰：「國家以蕭何之任付君，君居守而憂亂，奚以希慕古人乎？」) Sanguozhi vol. 55.)

Sun Quan ignored Zhang Zhao and put Gan Ning in charge of planning and leading the campaign. (Note: (權舉酒屬寧曰：「興霸，今年行討，如此酒矣，決以付卿。卿但當勉建方略，令必克祖，則卿之功，何嫌張長史之言乎。」) Sanguozhi vol. 55.) They emerged victorious in the campaign as they killed Huang Zu in battle and conquered Jiangxia Commandery.

=== Battle of Red Cliffs ===
In the late autumn of 208, Cao Cao launched a military campaign aimed at eliminating all forces in southern China who opposed him. He swiftly conquered Jing Province (covering present-day Hubei and Hunan) after the provincial governor Liu Cong surrendered without a fight. When Sun Quan's subjects heard that Cao Cao had gained control of Jing Province along with its tens of thousands of land and naval troops, they became fearful as they knew that Cao Cao's next target was Sun Quan's territories in the Jiangdong region. (Note: (其年九月，曹公入荊州，劉琮舉衆降，曹公得其水軍，船步兵數十萬，將士聞之皆恐。) Sanguozhi vol. 54.) Sun Quan summoned them for a meeting and showed them a threatening letter he received from Cao Cao, in which Cao Cao claimed that he had 800,000 troops. (Note: (江表傳載曹公與權書曰：「近者奉辭伐罪，旄麾南指，劉琮束手。今治水軍八十萬衆，方與將軍會獵於吳。」權得書以示羣臣，莫不嚮震失色。) Jiang Biao Zhuan annotation in Sanguozhi vol. 47.)

Some of Sun Quan's subjects, including Zhang Zhao and Qin Song, (Note: Sun Quan told Zhou Yu in a private conversation that he was deeply disappointed with Zhang Zhao and Qin Song for advising him to surrender to Cao Cao. (Note: (權撫背曰：「公瑾，卿言至此，甚合孤心。子布、元表諸人，各顧妻子，挾持私慮，深失所望，獨卿與子敬與孤同耳，此天以卿二人贊孤也。 ... 卿能辦之者誠決，邂逅不如意，便還就孤，孤當與孟德決之。」) Jiang Biao Zhuan annotation in Sanguozhi vol. 54.)) suggested that Sun Quan surrender to Cao Cao because, in their opinion, they could not win a battle against Cao Cao. (Note: (權延見羣下，問以計策。議者咸曰：「曹公豺虎也，然託名漢相，挾天子以征四方，動以朝廷為辭，今日拒之，事更不順。且將軍大勢，可以拒操者，長江也。今操得荊州，掩有其地，劉表治水軍，蒙衝鬬艦，乃以千數，操悉浮以沿江，兼有步兵，水陸俱下，此為長江之險，已與我共之矣。而勢力衆寡，又不可論。愚謂大計不如迎之。」) Sanguozhi vol. 54.) However, Sun Quan ultimately heeded the advice of Lu Su and Zhou Yu (Note: See the articles on Zhou Yu and Lu Su for details.) and hardened his decision to go to war with Cao Cao. He also told Lu Su and Zhou Yu privately that he was deeply disappointed with Zhang Zhao, Qin Song and those who advised him to surrender to Cao Cao. (Note: (肅對曰：「向察衆人之議，專欲誤將軍，不足與圖大事。 ... 願早定大計，莫用衆人之議也。」權歎息曰：「此諸人持議，甚失孤望；今卿廓開大計，正與孤同，此天以卿賜我也。」) Sanguozhi vol. 54.) (Note: (瑜曰：「不然。 ... 瑜請得精兵三萬人，進住夏口，保為將軍破之。」) Sanguozhi vol. 54.) After making up his mind, he summoned all his subjects, drew his sword, slashed the table in front of him and said: "Any of you who dares to speak of surrendering to Cao Cao shall end up like this table!" (Note: (江表傳曰：權拔刀斫前奏案曰：「諸將吏敢復有言當迎操者，與此案同！」) Jiang Biao Zhuan annotation in Sanguozhi vol. 54.)

In the winter of 208–209, Sun Quan and his ally Liu Bei scored a decisive victory over Cao Cao at the decisive Battle of Red Cliffs. After the Battle of Red Cliffs, while Zhou Yu led Sun Quan's forces to attack Cao Cao's garrison at Jiangling, Sun Quan personally led another army to attack Hefei, a heavily fortified city under Cao Cao's control. During the campaign, he ordered Zhang Zhao to lead a separate detachment of troops to assault Kuangqi (匡琦), another of Cao Cao's fortresses in Guangling Commandery (廣陵郡; around present-day Huai'an, Jiangsu). (Note: (權征合肥，命昭別討匡琦， ...) Wu Shu annotation Sanguozhi vol. 52.) Sun Quan and Zhang Zhao did not manage to capture Hefei and Kuangqi, while Zhou Yu successfully conquered Jiangling.

Zhang Zhao later led Sun Quan's forces to attack and eliminate bandit forces led by Zhou Feng (周鳳) in Yuzhang Commandery (豫章郡; around present-day Nanchang, Jiangxi). After this battle, Zhang Zhao hardly assumed positions of military command again as Sun Quan decided to keep him by his side as a strategist and adviser. Sun Quan also treated him very respectfully because of his senior status in the administration. (Note: (... 又督領諸將，攻破豫章賊率周鳳等於南城。自此希復將帥，常在左右，為謀謨臣。權以昭舊臣，待遇尤重。) Wu Shu annotation Sanguozhi vol. 52.)

In late 209 or early 210, after Sun Quan received the appointment of acting General of Chariots and Cavalry (車騎將軍) from the Han central government through Liu Bei's nomination, he appointed Zhang Zhao as his Army Adviser (軍師). (Note: (後劉備表權行車騎將軍，昭為軍師。) Sanguozhi vol. 52.)

=== Lecturing Sun Quan on hunting excursions ===
Sun Quan enjoyed going on hunting excursions as a leisure activity. On one occasion, while he was hunting a tiger on horseback with a bow and arrows, the tiger suddenly attacked him and clawed at his saddle. (Note: (權每田獵，常乘馬射虎，虎嘗突前攀持馬鞌。) Sanguozhi vol. 52.)

When Zhang Zhao heard about it, he lectured Sun Quan:

"General, why are you doing this? A ruler of men should be one who has control and mastery over the heroes and talents serving under him. You shouldn't be riding freely in the wilderness and proving your courage by wrestling with wild beasts. If you get into an accident, wouldn't you become a laughing stock of the whole Empire?" (Note: (昭變色而前曰：「將軍何有當爾？夫為人君者，謂能駕御英雄，驅使羣賢，豈謂馳逐於原野，校勇於猛獸者乎？如有一旦之患，柰天下笑何？」) Sanguozhi vol. 52.)

Sun Quan then apologised to Zhang Zhao: "I am young and lacking in wisdom. Sir, I am sorry for letting you down." (Note: (權謝昭曰：「年少慮事不遠，以此慙君。」) Sanguozhi vol. 52.)

Despite being lectured, Sun Quan was unwilling to give up on his favourite pastime so he designed a chariot for his hunting excursions. The chariot had squarish openings but no roof. Accompanied by only a driver to drive the chariot, Sun Quan fired arrows at wild beasts through the openings. When they encountered animals who left their packs/herds and came very close to the chariot, Sun Quan got out and took pleasure in hand-to-hand combat with the animal. When Zhang Zhao found out, he repeatedly urged Sun Quan to stop engaging in such dangerous activities but the latter laughed and ignored him. (Note: (然猶不能已，乃作射虎車，為方目，閒不置蓋，一人為御，自於中射之。時有逸羣之獸，輒復犯車，而權每手擊以為樂。昭雖諫爭，常笑而不荅。) Sanguozhi vol. 52.)

=== Service under the King of Wu ===
In late 220, Cao Cao's son and successor Cao Pi usurped the throne from Emperor Xian, ended the Eastern Han dynasty and established the state of Cao Wei (or Wei) with himself as the emperor. This event marked the beginning of the Three Kingdoms period in China.

In September 221, Sun Quan pledged nominal allegiance to Cao Pi and agreed to become a vassal of Wei. In return, Cao Pi sent an emissary, Xing Zhen (邢貞), to confer the title "King of Wu" (吳王) on Sun Quan. On 23 September that year, when Xing Zhen arrived at Wuchang (武昌; present-day Ezhou, Hubei), the capital of Sun Quan's domain, for the conferment ceremony, he did not dismount from his carriage when he reached the city gates. (Note: (魏黃初二年，遣使者邢貞拜權為吳王。貞入門，不下車。) Sanguozhi vol. 52.) Zhang Zhao told him:

"Courtesy is essential in propriety just as enforcement is essential in law. Sir, how dare you behave so arrogantly! Do you really think that the people of Jiangnan are so weak and poor that we don't even have an inch of a blade?" (Note: (昭謂貞曰：「夫禮無不敬，故法無不行。而君敢自尊大，豈以江南寡弱，無方寸之刃故乎！」) Sanguozhi vol. 52.)

Upon hearing what Zhang Zhao said, Xing Zhen immediately got off the carriage and entered the city on foot. (Note: (貞即遽下車。) Sanguozhi vol. 52.)

After Sun Quan became the King of Wu, he awarded Zhang Zhao the appointment of General Who Pacifies Distant Lands (綏遠將軍) and the peerage of Marquis of Youquan (由拳侯). (Note: (拜昭為綏遠將軍，封由拳侯。) Sanguozhi vol. 52.) Zhang Zhao, along with Sun Shao, Teng Yin, Zheng Li (鄭禮) and others, drafted the rules of imperial protocol for the Kingdom of Wu based on those of the Zhou and Han dynasties. (Note: (吳錄曰：昭與孫紹、滕胤、鄭禮等，採周、漢，撰定朝儀。) Wu Lu annotation Sanguozhi vol. 52.)

==== Lecturing Sun Quan on making merry ====
When Sun Quan was in Wuchang (武昌; present-day Ezhou, Hubei), he once hosted a drinking party on a terrace and invited all his subjects to attend. He ordered his servants to splash water at everyone, after which he jokingly declared: "The party shall not end until everyone gets dead drunk." (Note: (權於武昌，臨釣臺，飲酒大醉。權使人以水灑羣臣曰：「今日酣飲，惟醉墮臺中，乃當止耳。」) Sanguozhi vol. 52.)

Zhang Zhao did not say anything, put on a stern face, walked out of the party, and sat inside his carriage alone. (Note: (昭正色不言，出外車中坐。) Sanguozhi vol. 52.) Sun Quan sent someone to ask him to come back, and then asked him: "This is a time for all of us to make merry and be happy. Sir, why are you angry?" (Note: (權遣人呼昭還，謂曰：「為共作樂耳，公何為怒乎？」) Sanguozhi vol. 52.) Zhang Zhao replied:

"In the past, when King Zhou of the Shang dynasty spent much of his time feasting and drinking, everyone said that it was a time for enjoyment and no one said that it was something bad." (Note: (昭對曰：「昔紂為糟丘酒池長夜之飲，當時亦以為樂，不以為惡也。」) Sanguozhi vol. 52.)

Sun Quan fell silent and looked embarrassed after hearing Zhang Zhao's words. He then called off the party. (Note: (權默然，有慙色，遂罷酒。) Sanguozhi vol. 52.)

==== Not chosen to be Imperial Chancellor ====
In November 222, Sun Quan broke ties with Cao Pi and declared himself an independent ruler of his Kingdom of Wu by adopting an era name for his reign. After that, he wanted to create the position of Imperial Chancellor (丞相) in his government, so he consulted his subjects on suitable candidates to fill in this post. Although all of them came to the consensus that Zhang Zhao was the best candidate, (Note: (初，權當置丞相，衆議歸昭。) Sanguozhi vol. 52.) Sun Quan said: "We are living in times of chaos. Such key appointments are to be filled by persons capable of shouldering great responsibilities; they shouldn't be treated like honorary positions." (Note: (權曰：「方今多事，職統者責重，非所以優之也。」) Sanguozhi vol. 52.) Sun Quan ultimately selected Sun Shao to be the first Imperial Chancellor of Wu. (Note: (黃武初為丞相，威遠將軍，封陽羨侯。) Wu Lu annotation in Sanguozhi vol. 47.)

After Sun Shao died in office in the summer of 225, (Note: ([黃武]四年夏五月，丞相孫邵卒。) Sanguozhi vol. 47.) Sun Quan's subjects nominated Zhang Zhao to succeed Sun Shao as Imperial Chancellor. However, Sun Quan refused again and said: "It's not that I am being unkind towards Zibu (by not choosing him). The person holding the position of Imperial Chancellor has to deal with so many issues on a daily basis. (Zhang Zhao) is too headstrong. If people don't listen to him, there will be a lot of conflicts. It won't be helpful at all." He then chose Gu Yong to be the second Imperial Chancellor of Wu. (Note: (後孫邵卒，百寮復舉昭，權曰：「孤豈為子布有愛乎？領丞相事煩，而此公性剛，所言不從，怨咎將興，非所以益之也。」乃用顧雍。) Sanguozhi vol. 52.)

=== Service under the Emperor of Wu ===
In the summer of 229, after Sun Quan declared himself emperor of Wu, Zhang Zhao retired from active service on the grounds of old age and poor health. He resigned from his position as General Who Pacifies Distant Lands (綏遠將軍) and returned command of his troops to the Wu government. (Note: (權旣稱尊號，昭以老病，上還官位及所統領。) Sanguozhi vol. 52.)

==== Sun Quan embarrassing Zhang Zhao in public ====
According to the Jiang Biao Zhuan, although Sun Quan highly respected Zhang Zhao for his loyal, bold and forthright character, he never forgot that Zhang Zhao had advised him to surrender to Cao Cao before the Battle of Red Cliffs. (Note: (昭忠謇亮直，有大臣節，權敬重之，然所以不相昭者，蓋以昔駮周瑜、魯肅等議為非也。) Jiang Biao Zhuan annotation Sanguozhi vol. 52.) After he became emperor, he told all his subjects: "I wouldn't have become an emperor today if there wasn't Zhou Yu to assist me." (Note: (後權稱尊號，謂公卿曰：「孤非周公瑾，不帝矣。」) Jiang Biao Zhuan annotation in Sanguozhi vol. 54.) Just as Zhang Zhao prepared to hold up his hu and congratulate Sun Quan, the emperor remarked: "If I had listened to Lord Zhang, I'd be begging for food today." Zhang Zhao felt deeply embarrassed and he broke out in a cold sweat as he sank to his knees. (Note: (昭舉笏欲襃贊功德，未及言，權曰：「如張公之計，今已乞食矣。」昭大慙，伏地流汗。) Jiang Biao Zhuan annotation Sanguozhi vol. 52.)

Pei Songzhi, in his annotations to Zhang Zhao's biography in the Sanguozhi, argued that Zhang Zhao had never intended to help Sun Ce or Sun Quan become rulers in their own right; all he desired was to assist them in bringing peace to the common people living under their control. When he saw that Cao Cao had pacified northern China and conquered Jing Province just before the Battle of Red Cliffs, he advised Sun Quan to surrender to Cao Cao because he saw that as an opportunity for the fragmented Han Empire to be reunified under Cao Cao's control. If the Han Empire were reunified, there would be no more conflicts among the warlords, and the common people would finally be able to live in peace. Pei Songzhi thus concluded that although Zhang Zhao may not be considered loyal towards Sun Quan, he had the greater interests of the common people at heart. (Note: (臣松之以為張昭勸迎曹公，所存豈不遠乎？夫其揚休正色，委質孫氏，誠以厄運初遘，塗炭方始，自策及權，才略足輔，是以盡誠匡弼，以成其業，上藩漢室，下保民物；鼎峙之計，本非其志也。曹公仗順而起，功以義立，兾以清一諸華，拓平荊郢，大定之機，在於此會。若使昭議獲從，則六合為一，豈有兵連禍結，遂為戰國之弊哉！雖無功於孫氏，有大當於天下矣。昔竇融歸漢，與國升降；張魯降魏，賞延于世。況權舉全吳，望風順服，寵靈之厚，其可測量哉！然則昭為人謀，豈不忠且正乎！) Pei Songzhi's annotation Sanguozhi vol. 52.)

The Australian sinologist Rafe de Crespigny believed that this account from the Jiang Biao Zhuan is probably false because Sun Quan stood to gain little for his own reputation and authority from making such an extraordinary public insult at Zhang Zhao.

==== Life in retirement ====
Although Zhang Zhao had effectively retired, Sun Quan still gave him an honorary position as General Who Assists Wu (輔吳將軍), whose status was just below the Three Ducal Ministers in the hierarchy of the Eastern Wu government. Sun Quan also changed Zhang Zhao's peerage from the Marquis of Youquan (由拳侯) to the Marquis of Lou (婁侯), and awarded him a marquisate comprising 10,000 taxable households. (Note: (更拜輔吳將軍，班亞三司，改封婁侯，食邑萬戶。) Sanguozhi vol. 52.)

Zhang Zhao stayed at home after retiring and he spent his time writing a guide to the Zuo zhuan and an annotated copy of the Analects. (Note: (在里宅無事，乃著春秋左氏傳解及論語注。) Sanguozhi vol. 52.)

Sun Quan once asked Yan Jun to recite something he memorised in his childhood. Yan Jun thus recited "The Scope and Meaning of the Treatise", the opening paragraph of the Classic of Filial Piety. (Note: (權嘗問衞尉嚴畯：「寧念小時所闇書不？」畯因誦孝經「仲尼居」。) Sanguozhi vol. 52.) Zhang Zhao, who was also present, remarked: "Yan Jun is a mediocre scholar. I humbly seek permission to recite for Your Majesty." After Sun Quan approved, Zhang Zhao recited "The Service of the Ruler", another paragraph in the Classic of Filial Piety. Sun Quan's other subjects agreed that Zhang Zhao had a good understanding of what he should recite in front of the emperor. (Note: (昭曰：「嚴畯鄙生，臣請為陛下誦之。」乃誦「君子之事上」，咸以昭為知所誦。) Sanguozhi vol. 52.)

==== Quarrel with Sun Quan ====
Zhang Zhao was known for being very outspoken, forthright and blunt in his speech whenever he spoke up in Sun Quan's imperial court. On one occasion, after he openly defied an order from Sun Quan, he was not allowed to enter the imperial court for some time. (Note: (昭每朝見，辭氣壯厲，義形於色，曾以直言逆旨，中不進見。) Sanguozhi vol. 52.)

During this time, Wu's ally state Shu sent an ambassador to Wu for an official visit. The Shu ambassador sang praises about Shu in front of Sun Quan and his imperial court. Some Wu officials tried to challenge the Shu ambassador but failed. Sun Quan sighed: "If Lord Zhang were here, (the Shu ambassador) would feel intimidated before he could even debate with us, much less boast about his state!" (Note: (後蜀使來，稱蜀德美，而羣臣莫拒，權歎曰：「使張公在坐，彼不折則廢，安復自誇乎？」) Sanguozhi vol. 52.)

The following day, Sun Quan sent a messenger to visit Zhang Zhao at his residence and invite him back to the imperial court. When Zhang Zhao showed up, he apologised to Sun Quan but refused to take his seat, so Sun Quan knelt down and begged him to stop. (Note: (明日，遣中使勞問，因請見昭。昭避席謝，權跪止之。) Sanguozhi vol. 52.) Zhang Zhao then sat down, with his eyes looking up, and said:

"In the past, the Empress Dowager and Prince Huan didn't entrust me to Your Majesty; they entrusted Your Majesty to me instead. That's why I have been trying hard to fulfil my duty as a subject and repay them for the faith they placed in me, so that later generations will find something praiseworthy about me after I die. However, I not only lack knowledge and wisdom, but also defied the will of Your Majesty. Because of this, I expected to be left alone to die and have my dead body dumped into a ditch. I never expected to be summoned back to court and be able to serve Your Majesty again. Nevertheless, all I want is to serve my State with the utmost loyalty until my death. If anyone says I have changed my mind because I want to gain glory and earn Your Majesty's favour again, then he is absolutely wrong because this is something I will never do!" (Note: (昭坐定，仰曰：「昔太后、桓王不以老臣屬陛下，而以陛下屬老臣，是以思盡臣節，以報厚恩，使泯沒之後，有可稱述，而意慮淺短，違逆盛旨，自分幽淪，長棄溝壑，不圖復蒙引見，得奉帷幄。然臣愚心所以事國，志在忠益，畢命而已。若乃變心易慮，以偷榮取容，此臣所不能也。」) Sanguozhi vol. 52.)

Sun Quan apologised to him and left. (Note: (權辭謝焉。) Sanguozhi vol. 52.)

==== Quarrel with Sun Quan over the Liaodong issue ====
In 233, the Liaodong-based warlord Gongsun Yuan pledged allegiance to Sun Quan and expressed willingness to become a vassal of Eastern Wu. Sun Quan was delighted as he saw Gongsun Yuan as a potential ally against Wu's rival state, Wei. He then wanted to send Zhang Mi (張彌) and Xu Yan (許晏) as his representatives to Liaodong to meet Gongsun Yuan and grant him the title "King of Yan" (燕王). (Note: (權以公孫淵稱藩，遣張彌、許晏至遼東拜淵為燕王， ...) Sanguozhi vol. 52.) However, Zhang Zhao strongly objected and said:

"Gongsun Yuan isn't sincere about pledging allegiance to you. He needs aid from a distant ally because he's afraid that Wei will retaliate after he rebelled against them. If he decides to switch sides and surrender to Wei, the two representatives you send to Liaodong won't be able to return alive. If that happens, wouldn't you become a laughing stock?" (Note: (... 昭諫曰：「淵背魏懼討，遠來求援，非本志也。若淵改圖，欲自明於魏，兩使不反，不亦取笑於天下乎？」) Sanguozhi vol. 52.)

Sun Quan and Zhang Zhao had a heated quarrel over this issue; Zhang Zhao, adamant that he was right, stubbornly refused to yield. Sun Quan eventually lost his temper, placed his hand on the hilt of his sword, and angrily told Zhang Zhao: "When the people of Wu enter the palace, they pay respects to me. Outside the palace, they pay respects to you. My respect for you has already reached the maximum possible extent, yet you humiliate me in front of everyone. I am really afraid that I will lose control of myself and end up hurting you." (Note: (權與相反覆，昭意彌切。權不能堪，案刀而怒曰：「吳國士人入宮則拜孤，出宮則拜君，孤之敬君，亦為至矣，而數於衆中折孤，孤嘗恐失計。」) Sanguozhi vol. 52.) Zhang Zhao stared at Sun Quan for some time before replying:

"Although I know that my advice won't always be heeded, I will always try my best to fulfil my loyalty. That's because the dying words of the Empress Dowager – as she spoke to me when I was beside her in her final moments – still ring in my ears up till this day!" (Note: (昭孰視權曰：「臣雖知言不用，每竭愚忠者，誠以太后臨崩，呼老臣於牀下，遺詔顧命之言故在耳。」) Sanguozhi vol. 52.)

He then broke down in tears. Sun Quan dropped his sword and started crying too. (Note: (因涕泣橫流。權擲刀致地，與昭對泣。) Sanguozhi vol. 52.)

When Sun Quan ultimately sent Zhang Mi and Xu Yan to Liaodong, Zhang Zhao felt so frustrated with the emperor for not heeding his advice that he claimed that he was sick and refused to show up in the imperial court. An angry Sun Quan then ordered the entrance of Zhang Zhao's residence to be sealed by piling up earth in front of it to block people from entering or leaving. In response, Zhang Zhao also ordered his servants to pile up earth too and block the entrance from the inside. (Note: (然卒遣彌、晏往。昭忿言之不用，稱疾不朝。權恨之，土塞其門，昭又於內以土封之。) Sanguozhi vol. 52.)

In the autumn of 233, Gongsun Yuan betrayed Sun Quan and executed Zhang Mi and Xu Yan. When Sun Quan heard about it, he realised that he was in the wrong. After Zhang Zhao ignored his apologies several times, Sun Quan personally went to Zhang Zhao's residence and called him to come out but Zhang Zhao refused and claimed that he was ill. (Note: (淵果殺彌、晏。權數慰謝昭，昭固不起，權因出過其門呼昭，昭辭疾篤。) Sanguozhi vol. 52.) Sun Quan then set fire to the entrance of Zhang Zhao's residence to scare him and force him to come out. His plan backfired as Zhang Zhao not only refused to come out, but also shut all the doors and windows of his residence. (Note: (權燒其門，欲以恐之，昭更閉戶。) Sanguozhi vol. 52.) Left with no choice, Sun Quan ordered his servants to put out the fire, and he stood at the entrance for a long time. Zhang Zhao's sons then helped their father out, while Sun Quan arranged for a carriage to fetch Zhang Zhao to his palace. At the palace, Sun Quan apologised profusely to Zhang Zhao, who finally forgave him and returned to work. (Note: (權使人滅火，住門良乆，昭諸子共扶昭起，權載以還宮，深自克責。昭不得已，然後朝會。) Sanguozhi vol. 52.)

The Jin dynasty historian Xi Zuochi praised Sun Quan for acknowledging his mistake and doing his best to show his remorse and apologise to Zhang Zhao. However, he also criticised Zhang Zhao for his pompous and condescending attitude towards Sun Quan. He argued that Zhang Zhao, as a subject of a ruler, should know his place and refrain from pushing things to such an extreme even if he was right. (Note: (習鑿齒曰：張昭於是乎不臣矣！夫臣人者，三諫不從則奉身而退，身苟不絕，何忿懟之有？且秦穆違諫，卒霸西戎，晉文暫怒，終成大業。遺誓以悔過見錄，狐偃無怨絕之辭，君臣道泰，上下俱榮。今權悔往之非而求昭，後益迴慮降心，不遠而復，是其善也。昭為人臣，不度權得道，匡其後失，夙夜匪懈，以延來譽，乃追忿不用，歸罪於君，閉戶拒命，坐待焚滅，豈不悖哉！) Xi Zuochi's annotation Sanguozhi vol. 52.)

=== Death ===
Throughout his life, Zhang Zhao was known for maintaining a dignified and solemn appearance, and for having an awe-inspiring bearing. His colleagues in the Wu imperial court saw him as an intimidating figure. Sun Quan once said: "When I speak to Lord Zhang, I don't dare to say anything in jest." (Note: (昭容貌矜嚴，有威風，權常曰：「孤與張公言，不敢妄也。」舉邦憚之。) Sanguozhi vol. 52.)

Zhang Zhao died at the age of 81 (by East Asian age reckoning) in 236 during the Jiahe era (232–238) of Sun Quan's reign. Before he died, he gave instructions that he wanted to be buried in a coffin of simple design and to be dressed in plain clothes. Sun Quan donned mourning garments and attended his funeral in person. He also honoured Zhang Zhao with the posthumous title "Marquis Wen" (文侯). (Note: (年八十一，嘉禾五年卒。遺令幅巾素棺，歛以時服。權素服臨弔，謚曰文侯。) Sanguozhi vol. 52.)

== Family ==
Zhang Zhao was survived by at least two sons, who both served as military generals in Eastern Wu. His first son, Zhang Cheng, had already received a peerage of his own, so his second son Zhang Xiu inherited his peerage and became the next Marquis of Lou (婁侯). (Note: (長子承已自封侯，少子休襲爵。) Sanguozhi vol. 52.)

Zhang Zhao's nephew, Zhang Fen (張奮), designed a war chariot to serve as a siege engine when he was only 19. Bu Zhi recognised his talent and recommended him to serve in the Wu army. However, Zhang Zhao disapproved as he told Zhang Fen: "You are still young. Why do you want to put yourself through hardship by serving in the army?" Zhang Fen replied: "In the past, Wang the boy (Note: "Wang the boy" refers to Wang Qi (汪錡), a boy who fought and died for the Lu state during the Spring and Autumn period.) died a hero while Ziqi governed E. (Note: Ziqi (子奇) was a youth who, at the age of 15, became the governor of a certain E County (阿縣) in the Qi state during the Spring and Autumn period.) I may be untalented but I am no longer young." He then served in the army and rose through the ranks to become a general. The highest appointment he held was Chief Controller of Pingzhou (平州都督). He was also enfeoffed as the Marquis of Lexiang Village (樂鄉亭侯). (Note: (昭弟子奮年二十，造作攻城大攻車，為步隲所薦。昭不願曰：「汝年尚少，何為自委於軍旅乎？」奮對曰：「昔童汪死難，子奇治阿，奮實不才耳，於年不為少也。」遂領兵為將軍，連有功效，至平州都督，封樂鄉亭侯。) Sanguozhi vol. 52.)

== Appraisal ==
Chen Shou, who wrote Zhang Zhao's biography in the Sanguozhi, appraised him as follows: "Zhang Zhao received a mission to assist (Sun Quan). His contributions were outstanding. He was loyal, outspoken and upright; his actions were not for his own interests. However, he was feared because he was too stern, and he was shunned by others because he liked to assume the moral high ground. He was given neither the role of a chancellor nor an imperial tutor. Instead, he had a rather unimpressive career and spent his old age in retirement. This shows that Sun Quan was not as wise as Sun Ce." (Note: (評曰：張昭受遺輔佐，功勳克舉，忠謇方直，動不為己；而以嚴見憚，以高見外，旣不處宰相，又不登師保，從容閭巷，養老而已，以此明權之不及策也。) Sanguozhi vol. 52.)

The Dianlue (典略) recorded that Liu Biao, the governor of Jing Province, once wrote a letter to Sun Ce. Before sending, he showed it to Mi Heng, who disdainfully remarked: "Is this letter for children in Sun Ce's domain to read out? Or is it for Zhang Zibu's perusal?" (Note: (典略曰：余曩聞劉荊州甞自作書欲與孫伯符，以示禰正平，正平蚩之，言：「如是為欲使孫策帳下兒讀之邪，將使張子布見乎？」) Dianlue annotation in Sanguozhi vol. 52.) This remark showed that even the notoriously haughty Mi Heng acknowledged Zhang Zhao's literary talent. (Note: (如正平言，以為子布之才高乎？雖然，猶自蘊藉典雅，不可謂之無筆迹也。加聞吳中稱謂之仲父，如此，其人信一時之良幹，恨其不於嵩岳等資，而乃播殖於會稽。) Dianlue annotation in Sanguozhi vol. 52.)

== In Romance of the Three Kingdoms ==
Zhang Zhao's fictionalised persona in the 14th-century historical novel Romance of the Three Kingdoms is generally similar to its historical counterpart. In the novel, he first appears in Chapter 15 when Zhou Yu recommends him and Zhang Hong (not related to Zhang Zhao), who are collectively referred to as the "Two Zhangs" (二張) of Jiangdong", as talents to assist Sun Ce. Sun Ce then visited them at their homes and succeeded in recruiting them to serve as his advisers. In Chapter 29, when Sun Ce is about to die, he says that if Sun Quan cannot make decisions on domestic and external issues, he can consult Zhang Zhao and Zhou Yu respectively.

In chapters 43 to 49, when Sun Quan is discussing with his subjects about how to counter an impending invasion by Cao Cao just before the Battle of Red Cliffs, his subjects are divided into two camps: one advocating surrender to Cao Cao, and the other advocating going to war with Cao Cao. Zhang Zhao is one of the leading figures in the former camp. Chapter 43, in particular, describes a fictitious debate between Zhuge Liang and the various scholar-officials serving under Sun Quan. Zhang Zhao is the first among those scholar-officials to challenge Zhuge Liang, who manages to silence all of them through his eloquent responses to their queries and comments, as well as taunts and insults.

== See also ==
- Lists of people of the Three Kingdoms
