= Zhang Cheng (Han dynasty) =

Chinese official serving Cao Cao (died c.215)

- 張承

Army Adviser (參軍) (under Cao Cao)
- In office ? – c. 215

Administrator of Zhao Commandery (趙郡太守)
- In office 213 – c. 215

Army Adviser and Libationer (參軍祭酒) (under Cao Cao)
- In office 213 – c. 215

Counsellor Remonstrant (諫議大夫)
- In office 208 – 213
- Monarch: Emperor Xian of Han
- Chancellor: Cao Cao

Commandant of Yique (伊闕都尉)
- In office ? – 190
- Monarchs: Emperor Ling of Han / Emperor Xian of Han

Consultant (議郎)
- In office ?–?
- Monarch: Emperor Ling of Han

Personal details
- Born: Unknown Huojia County, Henan
- Died: c. 215 Xi'an, Shaanxi
- Relations: Zhang Xin (grandfather); Zhang Fan (brother); Zhang Zhao (brother)
- Children: Zhang Jian
- Parent: Zhang Yan (father)
- Occupation: Official
- Courtesy name: Gongxian (公先)

Zhang Cheng (died c. 215), courtesy name Gongxian, was an official serving under the warlord Cao Cao during the late Eastern Han dynasty of China. Often sent by his elder brother Zhang Fan to turn down offers to serve, Zhang Cheng would argue with one lord and later serve on Cao Cao's staff.

== Life ==
Zhang Cheng was born in the Eastern Han dynasty in Xiuwu County (脩武縣), Henei Commandery (河內郡), which is present-day Huojia County, Henan. His grandfather, Zhang Xin (張歆), served as Minister over the Masses (司徒) in the Han imperial court, while his father, Zhang Yan (張延), served as Grand Commandant (太尉). till 186 when he was jailed due to accusations by eunuchs and died. Zhang Cheng had a famed elder brother, Zhang Fan who turned down invitations to serve in the Han government, but Zhang Cheng accepted an offer to become a government official after he was nominated on grounds of virtuous conduct. He started out as a Consultant (議郎) and was later promoted to Commandant of Yique (伊闕都尉), guarding one of the passes to the capital Luoyang.

In 189, after the warlord Dong Zhuo seized control of the Han central government and held the figurehead Emperor Xian hostage, Zhang Cheng wanted to gather like-minded people to rise up against Dong Zhuo's tyranny and overthrow him. At the time, Zhang Zhao (張昭), (Note: This Zhang Zhao (張昭) was not the same person as the similarly named but better known Zhang Zhao (張昭).) a younger brother of Zhang Fan and Zhang Cheng, was also serving as a Consultant (議郎) under the Han government. Zhang Zhao came from the new capital of Chang'an to meet Zhang Cheng and tell him, "We can't defeat Dong Zhuo now because we aren't as powerful as him. Besides, it'll take time for us to set your plan into motion. We'll need to draft civilians into military service, train them to be soldiers, gain support from the political elites, and so on. It's impossible to achieve all these at the moment. Dong Zhuo won't last long because he lacks legitimacy and relies solely on military power. Why don't we find someone to take shelter under, pledge allegiance to him, and wait for an opportunity to take action, and fulfil our ambitions." Zhang Cheng agreed with his brother. He then resigned from government service, returned home, gathered his family members and moved to Yang Province.

In the 190s, the warlord Yuan Shu controlled the lands around the Huai River in Yang Province. He had heard of Zhang Cheng's elder brother, Zhang Fan, and wanted to recruit him as an adviser. However, Zhang Fan claimed that he was ill and sent Zhang Cheng to meet Yuan Shu instead. Yuan Shu asked Zhang Cheng, "In the past, when the kings of the Zhou dynasty were weak, warlords such as Duke Huan of Qi and Duke Wen of Jin rose up and became the dominant powers; when the Qin dynasty was collapsing, the Han dynasty rose up and replaced it. Now, as I rule over many territories and its people, I hope to enjoy the same glory as Duke Huan of Qi and Duke Wen of Jin did, and follow in the footsteps of Emperor Gaozu of Han. What do you think?" Zhang Cheng replied, "It depends on virtue rather than power. If a man can embody everyone's hopes for a benevolent and virtuous ruler, even if he has nothing to his name, it won't be hard for him to achieve what you described. However, if a man doesn't know his place and decides to do something against the people's will, everyone will abandon him instead of helping him." Yuan Shu was displeased by what Zhang Cheng said.

When the warlord Cao Cao, who controlled the Han central government and the figurehead Emperor Xian from 196 onwards, wanted to launch a military campaign in Ji Province, Yuan Shu summoned Zhang Cheng and asked him, "Lord Cao, with his few thousand weary and tired soldiers, wants to fight an army of 100,000. He doesn't know where he stands! What do you think?" Zhang Cheng replied, "The Han Empire may have declined in virtue, but its legitimacy still stands. Now, as Lord Cao has the Emperor on his side, he will still be able to prevail against an enemy with a 100,000 strong army." Yuan Shu was extremely unhappy but did not say anything. Zhang Cheng then left.

Around 207, after Cao Cao had defeated his rivals in northern China and unified the region under his control, he sent a messenger to invite Zhang Cheng's elder brother, Zhang Fan, to serve in the government. However, Zhang Fan claimed that he was ill and remained behind in Pengcheng (彭城; around present-day Xuzhou, Jiangsu). He sent Zhang Cheng to meet Cao Cao instead. Cao Cao appointed Zhang Cheng as a Counsellor Remonstrant and became a senior member on his staff. (諫議大夫).

On one occasion, Zhang Cheng's son Zhang Jian (張戩) and nephew Zhang Ling (張陵; Zhang Fan's son) were kidnapped by bandits in Shandong. When Zhang Fan asked them to release the boys, they freed only Zhang Ling. Zhang Fan then asked them if he could trade his son for his nephew instead because his nephew was younger. The bandits were so impressed by his act of sacrifice that they released both Zhang Ling and Zhang Jian.

In 213, after Emperor Xian enfeoffed Cao Cao as the Duke of Wei (魏公), Zhang Cheng was rewarded for being one of the petitioners for that advancement, as he was appointed as an Army Adviser and Libationer (參軍祭酒) under Cao Cao and concurrently as the Administrator (太守) of Zhao Commandery (趙郡; around present-day Neiqiu County, Hebei). He governed Zhao Commandery well during his tenure. Around 215, when Cao Cao was on campaign west in Hanzhong, he summoned Zhang Cheng to accompany him as an adviser in his army. Zhang Cheng died of illness in Chang'an along the way.

== Family ==
Apart from Zhang Jian (張戩), Zhang Cheng probably had at least one other child. Zhang Shao (張邵), a grandson of Zhang Cheng, (Note: It is not known whether or not Zhang Shao's father was Zhang Jian (張戩). Also, in Zizhi Tongjian, his name is written as "劭", with the same pronunciation.) served as a military officer (Note: Zhang Shao's post of zhong hu jun had great power as it allowed the holder to order troop movements within the palace. During the Incident at the Gaoping Tombs, Sima Shi was holding this post. Wang Ye was granted this post by Emperor Wu of Jin during the Jin dynasty after his betrayal of Cao Mao.) under the Jin dynasty (266–420). He was executed along with his maternal uncle, Yang Jun, in 291.

== See also ==
- Lists of people of the Three Kingdoms
