= Zhang Cheng (Three Kingdoms) =

Eastern Wu official and general (178-244)

- 張承

General of Vehement Might (奮威將軍)
- In office ? – 244
- Monarch: Sun Quan

Chief Controller of Ruxu (濡須都督)
- In office ?–?
- Monarch: Sun Quan

Commandant of the West Section of Changsha (長沙西部都尉)
- In office ?–?
- Monarch: Sun Quan

Personal details
- Born: 178
- Died: 244 (aged 66)
- Spouses: unidentified first wife; Zhuge Jin’s daughter
- Relations: Zhang Xiu (brother)
- Children: Zhang Zhen; Sun He's wife; Lu Kang's wife
- Parent: Zhang Zhao (father)
- Occupation: General
- Courtesy name: Zhongsi (仲嗣)
- Posthumous name: Marquis Ding (定侯)
- Peerage: Marquis of a Chief District (都鄉侯)

Zhang Cheng (178–244), courtesy name Zhongsi, was a military general of the state of Eastern Wu during the Three Kingdoms period of China.

== Life ==
Zhang Cheng was the elder son of Zhang Zhao, a senior statesman who served under Sun Quan, the founding emperor of Eastern Wu. At a young age, he was known for being well read and talented in scholarly arts. He was also a close friend of Zhuge Jin, Bu Zhi and Yan Jun.

When Sun Quan still held the nominal appointment of General of Chariots of Cavalry (驃騎將軍) in the late Eastern Han dynasty, he recruited Zhang Cheng to serve as an assistant official in the west bureau of his office. Later, he promoted Zhang Cheng to the position of Commandant of the West Section of Changsha Commandery (長沙西部都尉). During this time, he pacified some local tribes in Changsha Commandery and managed to recruit 15,000 of them to serve in the Wu army.

Some time later, Zhang Cheng was promoted to General of Vehement Might (奮威將軍) and put in command of 5,000 troops. Sun Quan appointed him as the Chief Controller (都督) of Ruxu (濡須), a Wu garrison strategically located along the Yangtze River at the north of present-day Wuwei County, Anhui. He also enfeoffed Zhang Cheng as a Marquis of a Chief District (都鄉侯).

Zhang Cheng was known for his bold, courageous and loyal personality. Apart from these traits, he was also known for being a good judge of character. He spotted talents such as Cai Kuan (蔡款) and Xie Jing (謝景) and promoted them accordingly. Cai Kuan later rose the position of Minister of the Guards (衞尉) in the Wu government, while Xie Jing became the Administrator of Yuzhang Commandery (豫章郡; around present-day Nanchang, Jiangxi). When Zhuge Ke, the eldest son of Zhang Cheng's friend Zhuge Jin, was still a youth, he received high praise from many people for his extraordinary talents. Zhang Cheng, however, accurately predicted that Zhuge Ke would bring doom to his family one day.

Throughout his life, Zhang Cheng was known for his passion for learning. He constantly sought opportunities to enrich himself with more knowledge and skills, and attracted numerous visitors to his residence. He died in 244 at the age of 66, and was honoured with the posthumous title "Marquis Ding" (定侯).

== Family ==
Zhang Cheng's son, Zhang Zhen (張震), inherited his father's peerage as a Marquis of a Chief District (都鄉侯). After Zhang Cheng's first wife died, his father Zhang Zhao suggested that he marry his friend Zhuge Jin's daughter. Zhang Cheng initially declined because he felt awkward about becoming his friend's son-in-law, but eventually agreed after Sun Quan persuaded him to do so.

Zhang Cheng and Zhuge Jin's daughter had a daughter, Lady Zhang who married Sun He, the third son of Sun Quan. Sun Quan often reminded Sun He to be courteous towards Zhang Cheng and paid due respect as a son-in-law. Zhang Cheng's son, Zhang Zhen, was implicated and purged in the aftermath of Zhuge Ke's downfall because he was a maternal nephew of Zhuge Ke. Zhang Cheng also had another daughter, who married Lu Kang and bore Lu Jing. She was also purged in the aftermath of Zhuge Ke's downfall because she was his maternal niece.

== See also ==
- Lists of people of the Three Kingdoms
