= The Literary Mind and the Carving of Dragons =

5th-century work by Liu Xie

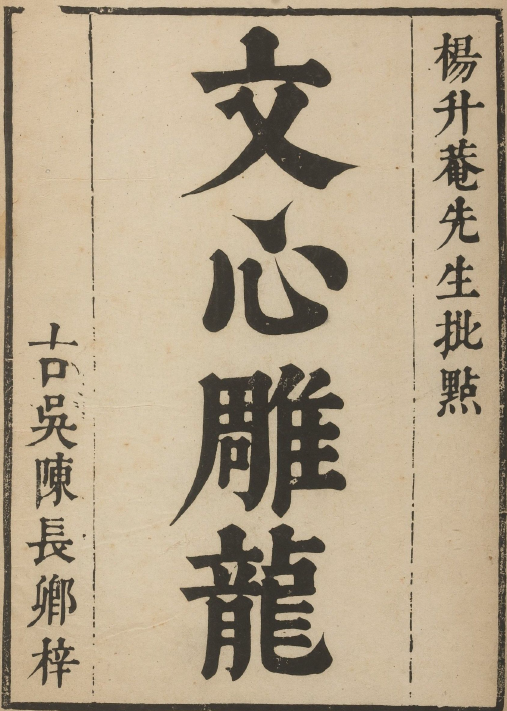
The Literary Mind and the Carving of Dragons

The Literary Mind and the Carving of Dragons (Chinese: 文心雕龍; pinyin: Wén Xīn Diāo Lóng) is a 5th-century work on Chinese literary aesthetics by Liu Xie, composed in fifty chapters (篇) according to the principles of numerology and divination found in the Book of Changes or I Ching. The work also draws on and argues against the 3rd century author Lu Ji's work the Wen fu 文賦 ("On Literature"). Liu Xie wished to give a complete and internally consistent account of literature. One of his ideas is that affections are the medium of literature, and language merely the product.

== Translations ==
- Liu Xie (1983). The Literary Mind and the Carving of Dragons. Translated by Vincent Yu-chung Shih. Hong Kong: The Chinese University Press – via archive.org.
- Liu Xie (2003). Dragon-Carving and the Literary Mind. Translated by Yang Guobin. Beijing: Foreign Language Teaching and Research Press.
