= Lu Jing =

Eastern Wu general and writer (250–280)

- 陸景

Commandant of Zhongxia (中夏督)
- In office ? – 280
- Monarch: Sun Hao

Personal details
- Born: 250
- Died: 280 (aged 30)
- Spouse: Lady Sun
- Parents: Lu Kang (father); Lady Zhang (mother)
- Occupation: General, writer
- Courtesy name: Shiren (士仁)
- Peerage: Marquis of Piling (毗陵侯)

Lu Jing (c. 250 – 23 March 280), courtesy name Shiren, was a Chinese military general and writer of the state of Eastern Wu during the Three Kingdoms period of China. He was the second son of Lu Kang and a grandson of Lu Xun.

== Life ==
Lu Jing's mother was Zhang Cheng's daughter. Lu Jing married Sun He's daughter, who was born to another daughter of Zhang Cheng. Hence, both Lu Jing and his wife were Zhang Cheng's maternal grandchildren. Lu Jing's mother was also a niece of Zhuge Ke, as Zhang Cheng had married a daughter of Zhuge Jin. She was sent into exile after Zhuge Ke and his clan were exterminated in a coup in 253. Lu Jing was raised by his grandmother, whom he mourned for three years when she died. Lu Jing served as a Cavalry Commandant (騎都尉) and received the title "Marquis of Piling" (毗陵侯). He was later promoted to Lieutenant-General (偏將軍) and served as the Commandant (督) of Zhongxia (中夏). Lu Jing was known to be studious and he wrote books which were tens of volumes long. He was killed in action during the Jin conquest of Wu in March 280 along with his elder brother Lu Yan (陸晏). He was 31 years old (by East Asian age reckoning) at the time of his death.

== See also ==
- Lists of people of the Three Kingdoms
