= Liu Xie =

Chinese monk, politician and writer (c.465–522)

Liu Xie (Chinese: 劉勰; pinyin: Liú Xié, c.465–522), courtesy name Yanhe (彦和), was a Chinese monk, politician, and writer. He was the author of China's greatest work of literary aesthetics, The Literary Mind and the Carving of Dragons (文心雕龍). His biography is included in the Book of Liang.

== Life ==
A native of today's Zhenjiang, Liu's traced his ancestry to Shandong. (Note: Liu's biography in Book of Liang record that his grandfather Liu Lingzhen was a younger brother of Liu Xiuzhi, who was sikong during the Liu Song dynasty. Liu Xiuzhi has a biography in vol.81 of Book of Song; his clansman Liu Muzhi has a biography in vol.42 of the same work. Liu Xiuzhi was described as a "congxiong zi" (从兄子) of Liu Muzhi, which could mean that Muzhi was a cousin of Xiuzhi's father. Liu Muzhi's biography recorded that he was a descendant of Liu Fei, Prince of Qi.) He was orphaned in his youth and chose not to marry, either because of poverty or conviction (or both). (Note: Liu's poverty was probably relative, as he could support his studies despite being an orphan. As a member of a gentry clan, Liu was expected to marry a woman of equal status. However, his orphaning and relative poverty could mean that the other gentry clans did not want to marry their daughters to him.) Liu studied Buddhism with Sengyou and helped edit sutras at the Dinglin Monastery (定林寺) until his death during the Liang Dynasty. It was during his time editing Buddhist scriptures that he wrote his The Literary Mind and the Carving of Dragons.

He later became a private secretary to Xiao Hong, brother of the Liang founding emperor Xiao Yan. He also did logistics for a military unit and was later promoted to county magistrate in Taimo (modern day Longyou county, Zhejiang province). Eventually, he again worked as a secretary to the emperor's other sons, until he was later sent back to the monastery. When the scripture editing project was finished, Liu decided to continue on at the monastery.

Liu also wrote The Great Enlightenment (Hong Ming Ji) and On the World (Shijie Ji), both of which are lost. He also wrote an essay entitled "Treatise on Refuting Falsehood" (Mie Huo Lun).

== Psychology experiment ==
Liu Xie conducted a psychology experiment by asking his subjects to draw a circle on a piece of paper with one hand, while the other hand tried to simultaneously draw a square. This test was to measure the level of distraction that could be managed by his subjects. As Liu observed, his students, who were the subjects of his experiment, struggled to perform both tasks simultaneously. What Liu's experiment had demonstrated was that by doing two experiments at once will mean that neither experiment is done correctly.
