= 243 =

243 in various calendars
- Gregorian calendar: 243; CCXLIII
- Ab urbe condita: 996
- Assyrian calendar: 4993
- Balinese saka calendar: 164–165
- Bengali calendar: −351 – −350
- Berber calendar: 1193
- Buddhist calendar: 787
- Burmese calendar: −395
- Byzantine calendar: 5751–5752
- Chinese calendar: 壬戌年 (Water Dog); 2940 or 2733 — to — 癸亥年 (Water Pig); 2941 or 2734
- Coptic calendar: −41 – −40
- Discordian calendar: 1409
- Ethiopian calendar: 235–236
- Hebrew calendar: 4003–4004
- Hindu calendars
- Vikram Samvat: 299–300
- Shaka Samvat: 164–165
- Kali Yuga: 3343–3344
- Holocene calendar: 10243
- Iranian calendar: 379 BP – 378 BP
- Islamic calendar: 391 BH – 390 BH
- Javanese calendar: 121–122
- Julian calendar: 243; CCXLIII
- Korean calendar: 2576
- Minguo calendar: 1669 before ROC 民前1669年
- Nanakshahi calendar: −1225
- Seleucid era: 554/555 AG
- Thai solar calendar: 785–786
- Tibetan calendar: ཆུ་ཕོ་ཁྱི་ལོ་ (male Water-Dog); 369 or −12 or −784 — to — ཆུ་མོ་ཕག་ལོ་ (female Water-Boar); 370 or −11 or −783

Year 243 (CCXLIII) was a common year starting on Sunday of the Julian calendar. At the time, it was known in Rome as the Year of the Consulship of Arrianus and Papus (or, less frequently, year 996 Ab urbe condita). The denomination 243 for this year has been used since the early medieval period, when the Anno Domini calendar era became the prevalent method in Europe for naming years.

== Events ==
=== By place ===
==== Roman Empire ====
- Battle of Resaena: A Roman army under Timesitheus defeats the Sassanids at Resaena (modern Syria); King Shapur I is forced to flee to the Euphrates.
- Timesitheus becomes ill and dies under suspicious circumstances. Shapur I retreats to the Sassanid Empire, giving up all the territories he has conquered.
- Emperor Gordian III appoints Philip the Arab as his new praetorian prefect (after the death of Timesitheus) and proceeds with his campaign in Mesopotamia.
- Cohors I Ubiorum, the garrison at Capidava in Scythia Minor, is replaced by Cohors I Germanorum Civium Romanorum, until the end of the 3rd century AD.

==== Asia ====
- Fan Chan of Funan sends a tribute mission to China (approximate date).

== Births ==
- Sun Hao, Chinese emperor of the Eastern Wu state (d. 284)
- Sun Liang, Chinese emperor of the Eastern Wu state (d. 260)

== Deaths ==
- Gu Yong (or Yuantan), Chinese official and politician (b. 168)
- Hu Zong (or Weize), Chinese official and general (b. 183)
- Timesitheus, Roman advisor and praetorian prefect (b. 190)
- Xue Zong (or Jingwen), Chinese official, politician and poet
