= Munteanu =

Munteanu (Romanian: [munˈte̯anu]) is a Romanian-language surname. When transliterated from Russian, it may be spelled as Muntyanu. It is commonly found in Romania and Moldova and literally translates as "highlander". Notable people with this surname include:

- Alexandru Munteanu (disambiguation), multiple people, including:
  - Alexandru Munteanu (born 1964), Moldovan economist, professor, businessman, and politician, Prime Minister of Moldova
  - Alexandru Munteanu (footballer) (born 1987), Romanian footballer
- Anastasiya Muntyanu (born 1994), Canadian gymnast
- Andreea Munteanu (born 1998), Romanian artistic gymnast
- Anton Munteanu (1932–2007), Romanian footballer
- Aura Andreea Munteanu (born 1988), Romanian gymnast
- Aurel Munteanu (born 1955), Romanian footballer and businessman
- Cătălin Munteanu (born 1979), Romanian footballer
- Cherasim Munteanu (fl. 1970s), Romanian sprint canoer
- Cristian Munteanu (born 1974), Romanian footballer
- Cristian Lucian Munteanu (born 1980), Romanian footballer
- Daniel Munteanu (born 1978), Romanian footballer
- Donar Munteanu (1886–1972), Romanian poet
- Dorinel Munteanu (born 1968), retired Romanian footballer and manager
- Dumitru Munteanu (1932–2020), Romanian footballer
- Eugen Munteanu (born 1953), Romanian linguist
- Florian Munteanu (born 1990), German-Romanian actor
- Gabriel Munteanu (born 1973), Romanian judoka
- Gavriil Munteanu (1812–1869), Romanian scientist and translator
- Gheorghe Munteanu-Murgoci (1872–1925), Romanian geologist
- Igor Munteanu (born 1965), Moldovan political analyst and journalist
- Ion Munteanu (born 1962), Moldovan politician
- Ion Munteanu (1955–2006), Romanian footballer
- Ionica Munteanu (born 1979), Romanian female handballer
- Kiara Munteanu (born 1997), Australian female artistic gymnast
- Louis Munteanu (born 2002), Romanian footballer
- Luminata Munteanu, Romanian sprint canoer
- Marian Munteanu (born 1962), Romanian student leader
- Neculai Munteanu (born 1941), Romanian anti-communist dissident
- Nicodim Munteanu (1864–1948), also known as Patriarch Nicodim, head of the Romanian Orthodox Church 1939–1948
- Nicolae Munteanu (born 1951), Romanian handball player
- Nina Munteanu (born 1954), Canadian ecologist and novelist of science fiction and fantasy
- Olga Munteanu (born 1927), Romanian artistic gymnast
- Petre Munteanu (1916–1988), Romanian operatic tenor
- Silvia Sorina Munteanu, Romanian opera singer
- Titus Munteanu (1941−2013), Romanian director, filmmaker and producer
- Valeriu Munteanu (disambiguation), multiple people, including:
  - Valeriu Munteanu (philologist) (1921–1999), Romanian philologist, lexicographer, and translator
  - Valeriu Munteanu (politician) (born 1980), Moldovan politician
- Virgil Munteanu (born 1988), Romanian Greco-Roman wrestler
- Vlad Munteanu (born 1981), Romanian footballer
- Zamfir Munteanu (fl. 1917–18), Moldovan politician

== See also ==
- 20287 Munteanu, an asteroid discovered in March 1998
- Muntean
