= Dunărea =

Dunărea may refer to:

- Dunărea, the Romanian name for the river Danube in Central Europe
- Dunărea (river), a tributary of the Danube in Constanța County, Romania
- Dunărea, a village in the commune Seimeni, Constanța County, Romania

== See also ==
- FC Dunărea Călărași, a football team
- FCM Dunărea Galați, a football team
- Stadionul Dunărea, a football stadium, the home of FCM Dunărea Galaţi
- FC Dunărea Giurgiu or FC Astra Giurgiu, a football team
- Dunăreni (disambiguation)
