= Dunărea (river) =

- Location within Romania

Location
- Country: Romania
- Counties: Constanța County
- Villages: Crucea, Băltăgești, Dunărea

Physical characteristics
- Source
  - elevation: 120 m (390 ft)
- Mouth: Danube
  - coordinates: 44.4381°N 28.1140°E
  - elevation: 6 m (20 ft)
- Length: 23 km (14 mi)
- Basin size: 148 km^{2} (57 sq mi)

Basin features
- Progression: Danube→ Black Sea
- Tributaries
  - left: Crucea, Băltăgești
- River code: XIV.1.44

The Dunărea is a right tributary of the Danube in Romania. It flows into the Danube in the village Dunărea. Its length is 23 km (14 mi) and its basin size is 148 km^{2} (57 sq mi). Its source is at 120 m (390 ft) elevation, north of the village Crucea.
