= Sun Shao =

Sun Shao may refer to:

- Sun Shào (孫邵; 163-225), courtesy name Changxu (長緒), first chancellor of Eastern Wu
- Sun Shào (zh:孫紹), posthumous son of the Han dynasty warlord Sun Ce
- Sun Sháo (孫韶; 188-241), Eastern Wu general of the Three Kingdoms period
