= Capidava =

Archaeological site in Romania

Coordinates: 44°29′37″N 28°5′25″E

Castra Capidava
- Cappidava, Capidapa, Kapidaua, Calidava, Calidaua
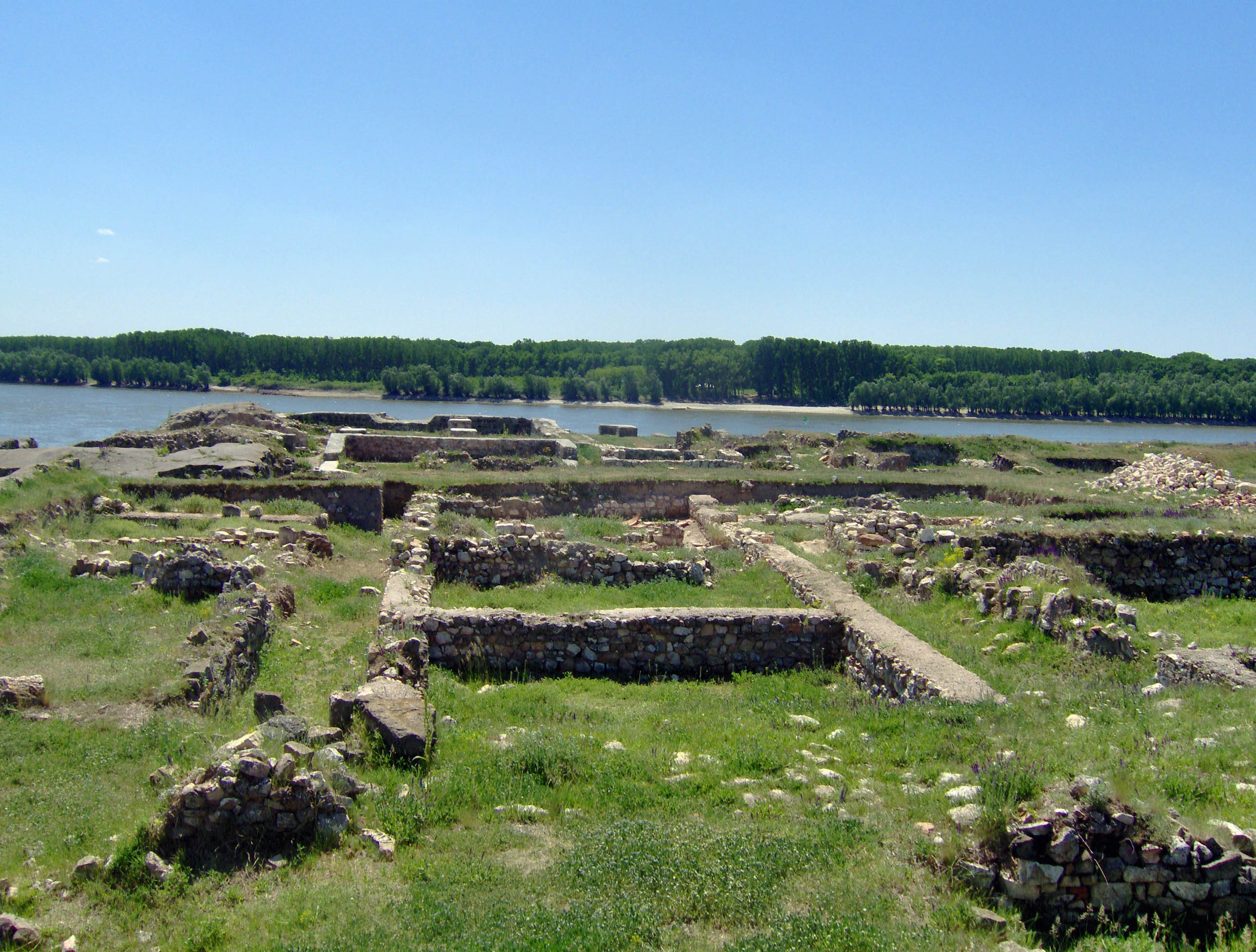
- Capidava fort

- Location within Romania
- Location: Capidava, Romania

History
- Founded: 1st century AD
- Abandoned: 9th century

Site notes
- Condition: Ruined
- Website: www.capidava.ro

Capidava (Kapidaua, Cappidava, Capidapa, Calidava, Calidaua) was originally an important Geto-Dacian centre on the right bank of the Danube. After the Roman conquest, it became a civil and military centre in the province of Moesia Inferior (later Scythia Minor) and part of the defensive frontier system of the Moesian Limes along the Danube.

It is located in the village with the same name in Constanța County, Romania.

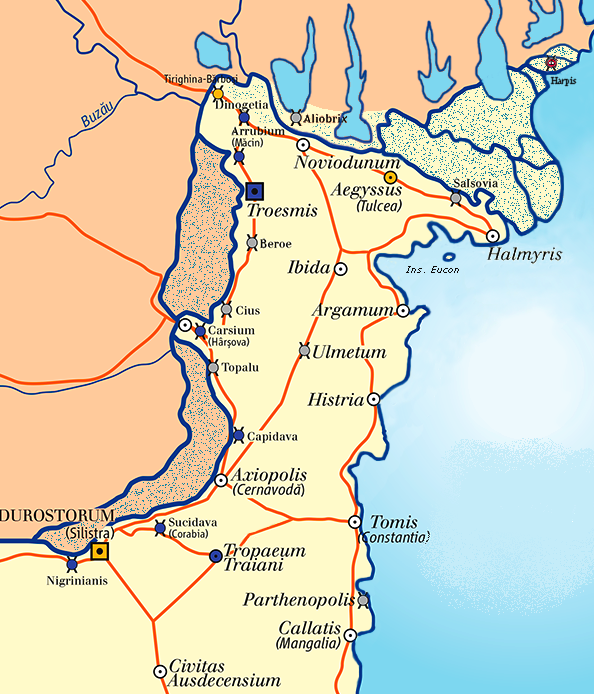
Eastern Moesia and Limes Moesiae

== Ancient sources ==
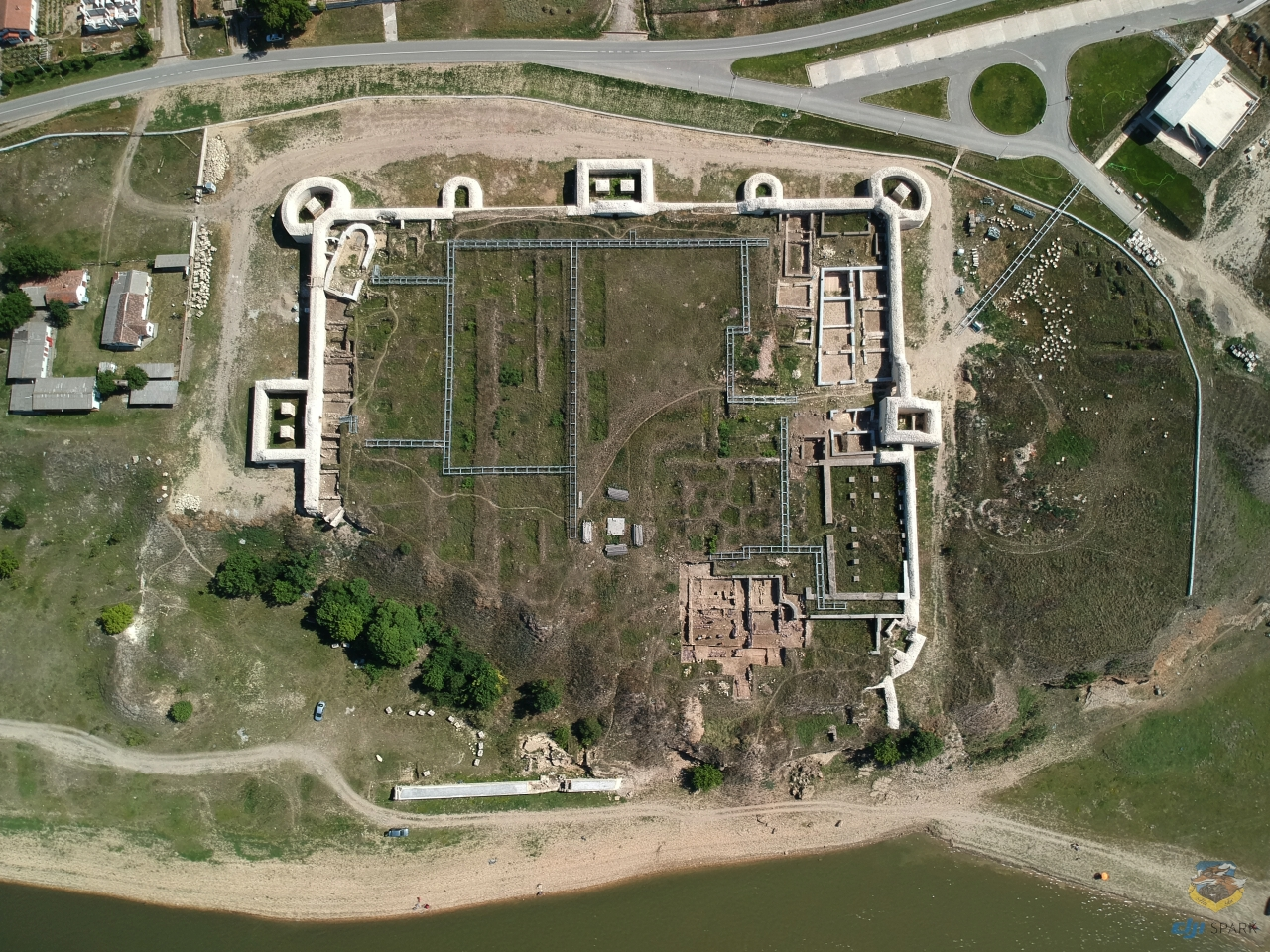
Capidava

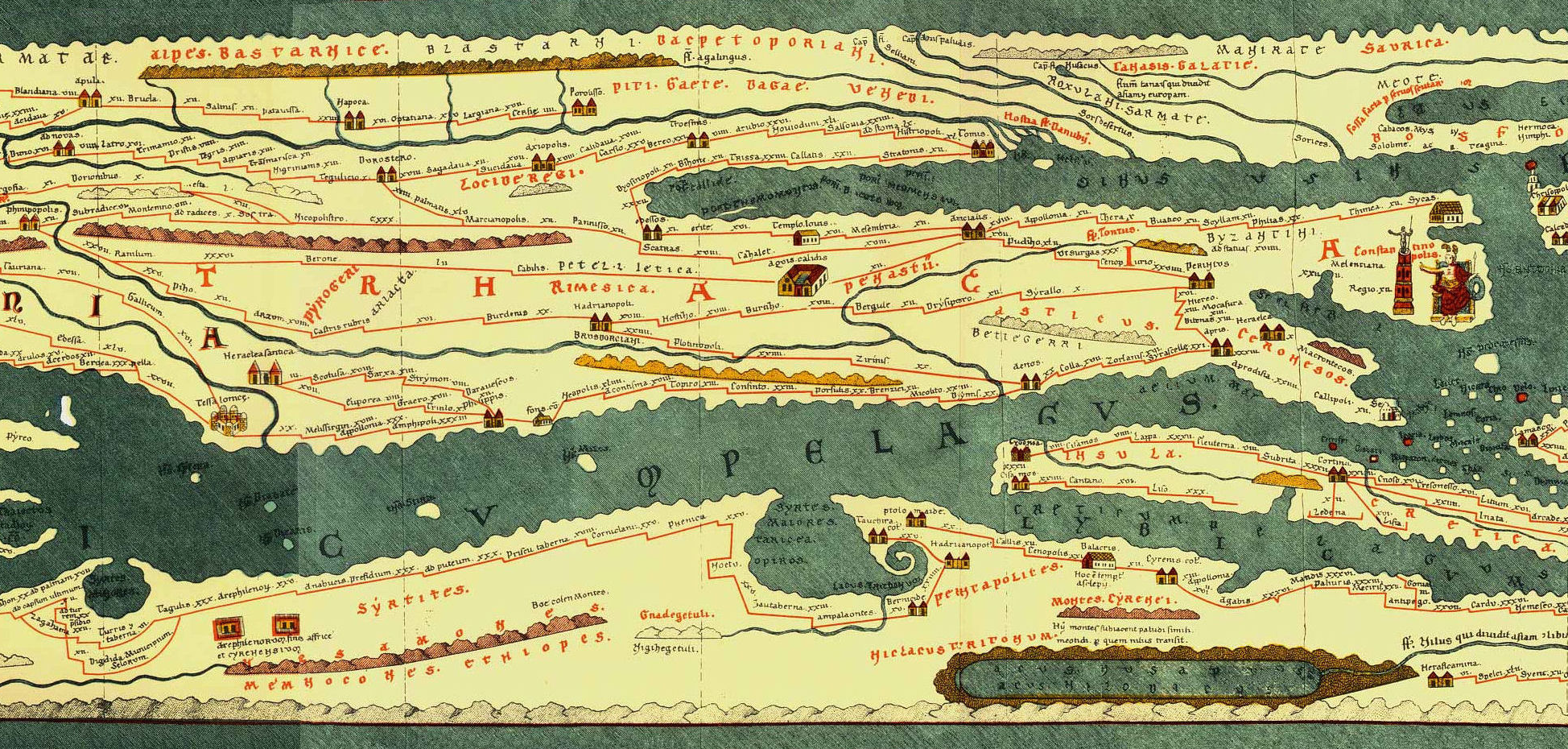
Capidava (Calidava) on Tabula Peutingeriana (upper centre)

=== Tabula Peutingeriana ===
Capidava is depicted in the form Calidava/Calidaua in Segmentum VIII of Tabula Peutingeriana (1st–4th century) on a Roman road between Axiopolis and Carsium. The map provides distances between Axiopolis, Capidava and Carsium which coincide with the distances between the sites. This is also verified by the discovery of a milestone at Seimenii Mici that indicates the distance of 18,000 feet (27 km) from Axiopolis to Capidava.

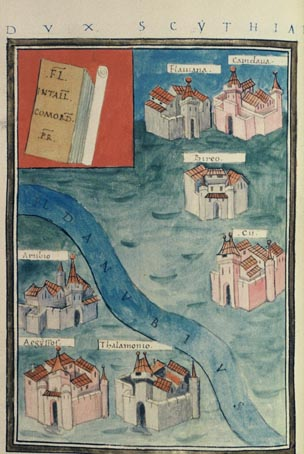
Capidava on Notitia Dignitatum, Dux Scythiae

=== Notitia Dignitatum ===
Capidava appears on an illustration from Notitia Dignitatum imperii romani between the forts standing on the Lower Danube limes and found under the authority of the military commander of the province (dux Scythiae). Notitia also mentions at Capidava (form Capidaua) a cavalry unit or detachment of units under the command of the Duke of Scythia: Cuneus equitum Solensium, Capidaua. The Cuneus equitum Solensium might well be the cavalry component of the old Legio XX Valeria Victrix, renamed the Solenses.

== Etymology ==
Capidava took its name from the old Getic dava "settlement". "Capidava" has the characteristic Dacian ending, the suffix –dava meaning "settlement, village, town". This Getic toponym, means the "curve fortified settlement". The Getic name had been preserved by the Romans under the form Capidava in the Antonine Itinerary (224, 3), Calidava in the Tabula Peutingeriana (VIII, 3) and Cappidava or Capidapa in the Geography of Ravenna (179, 3 and 186). The entire territory took the name "territorium capidavense". Petculescu noted that in the zone of the Danubian frontier zone the names of the sites of the forts and the civilian settlements related to them were overwhelmingly of pre-Roman origin, mostly Geto-Dacian. In the southern part of the frontier there was a concentration of names ending in dava, characteristic of the Geto-Dacian hill-forts, indicating that the Roman army found a lot of local tribes dwelling in fortified sites according to their traditions. Nevertheless, Capidava is one of the few Roman-era settlements with indigenous names in the area where no significant pre-Roman settlement was found.

== History ==
=== Dacian town ===
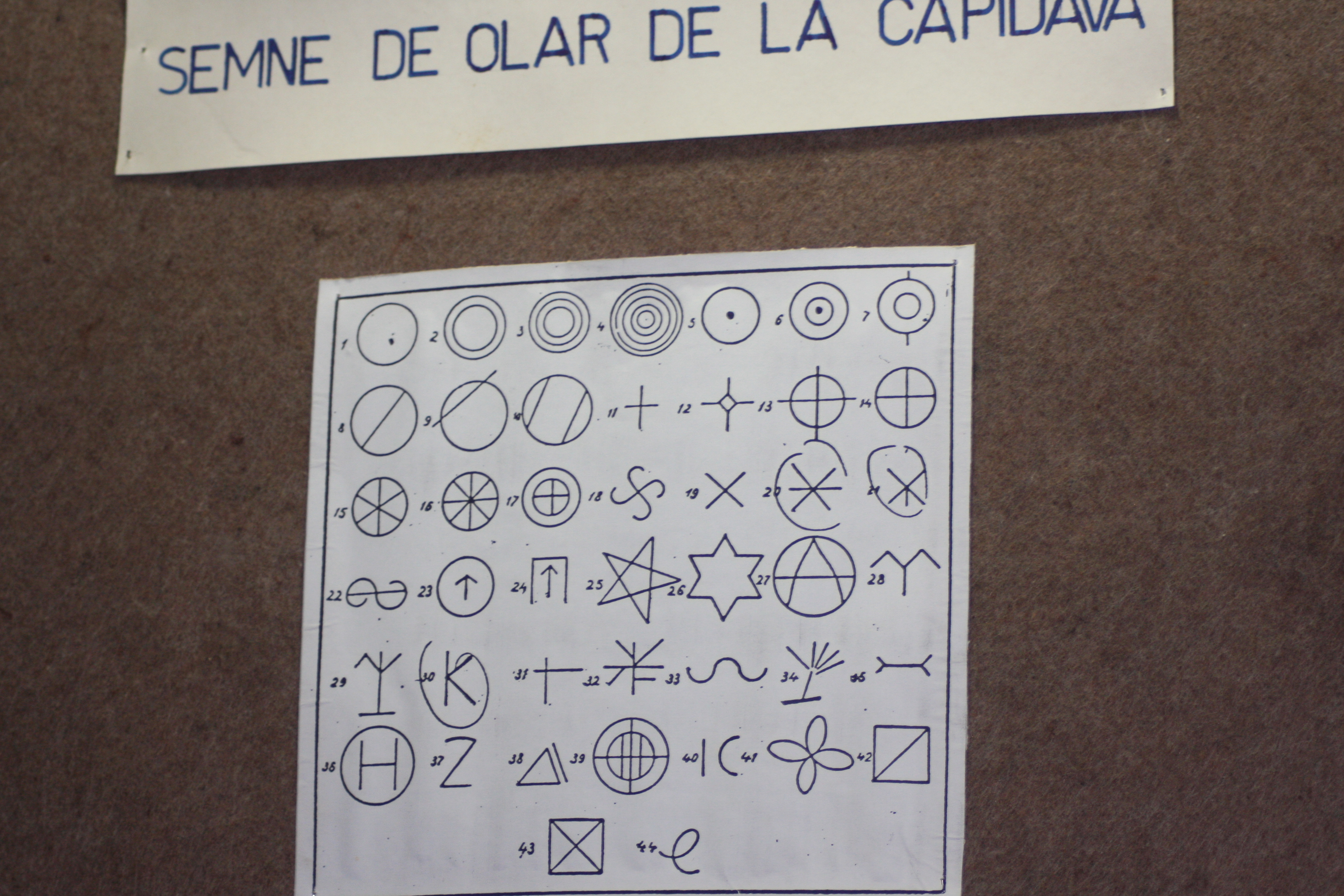
Pottery markers found at Capidava, in display at the Constanța Museum of National History, Romania.

Based on the literary evidence that confirms both the existence and the importance of Capidava and also based on the archaeological pre-Roman evidence, some take into consideration the hypothesis that the Getic fortress might have been razed to the ground through the building of the Roman castra itself

Historians such as Suceveanu, Miclea and Florescu consider that the pre-Roman indigenous Getic settlement of Capidava, located at some distance from the future Roman fortress gave the name Capidava. On the site of modern Capidava village, there is a La Tène settlement of Geto-Dacian culture, dated to 5th century - 2nd century BC. At 4 km south of Capidava, on the bank of Zaval Valley, there are strong Geto-Dacian traces, dating back to the second period of Iron Age. Beside the Geto-Dacian ceramic, fragments of Roman vases are scattered here and there.

The early 20th century Romanian archaeologist and historian Vasile Pârvan identified the Geto-Dacian Capidava as the center of power for the Getic king Dapyx, within a territorium Capidavense. Cassius Dio's Historia Romana makes mention of the retreat of Dapyx into his fort after his defeat in 28 BC at the hand of Marcus Licinius Crassus. Pârvan identified the fort mentioned by Dio with future Roman fort Capidava, stating the locations described in the ancient source fit well with the modern location.

Pârvan identified the administrative form of Capidava as an old Dacian pagus, based on a local inscription.

The archaeological material of the 2nd century AD is mixed in character: Geto-Dacian and Roman. The funeral stone of the Cocceius family from Capidava, dated Roman epoch, has a relief of the Thracian rider. Representation of the ox drawn plow of Getians had been preserved on the so-called "Quadratus grave" discovered at Capidava.

=== Roman era ===
The Roman Empire had reached the Danube as early as 14 AD, when the commander Aelius Catus conducted an expedition beyond the river in order to keep away the restless Dacians and their new allies, the Sarmatians. But the legions deployed their troops only up to Durostorum, as northern Dobruja was left to the forces of the kings of the Sapaei, the allies of the Romans, helped by the forces commanded by a Praefectus orae maritimae (commander of the seashore). In 46 AD, when the Kingdom of the Sapaei ceased to exist, it is likely that small Roman garrisons were stationed in the old Dacian settlements on the bank of the Danube, including in Capidava.

Later Domitian realised the strategic importance of the land between the Danube and the Black Sea, as he used this part of Moesia as a starting point of his expeditions over the Danube against the Dacians. The changing fate of these expeditions and the chaotic effect of two successive defeats hindered systematic strengthening and garrisoning the bank of the Danube.

Trajan, as part of his preparations for Trajan's Dacian Wars, built a castellum on the cliff at Capidava to control the ford with a garrison probably of Cohors I Ubiorum.

After the Roman conquest of Dacia, the strategic importance of Capidava made the Romans establish a military station as well as to settle and develop a civil centre. The settlement was probably a vicus, if Veturius Tertius who put an altar at Galbiori as magister vici is the same C. Veturius Tertius known from a funerary inscription discovered at Capidava Nonetheless, Pârvan admitted a "vicus canabarum" beside the old "Dacian" pagus of Capidava.

At the time of Hadrian and even earlier at the time of Trajan, Roman farmers already dwelt in isolated settlements, in the so-called Roman villa and vicus. Separated from them, South Thracian colonists, Bessians, inhabited also isolated villages. The population of its district (pagus) consisted of Dacians and Bessi and of Roman citizens (CIL., iii, 14214, 26). According to Pârvan, by 130-150 AD Capidava was already Romanized. Roman veterans settled in the canabae (civilian settlement attached to military base) or maybe also in the old Getic village that was not far away. Inscriptions with Dacian names like Tsinna (Zinnas, Sinna) and Tsiru dating to 2nd century have been discovered at the site: "Tsiru son of Bassus in ISM V 27".

The fort continued to function without many problems, except for the change in the garrison troops, after 243 AD when Cohors I Ubiorum was replaced by Cohors I Germanorum civium romanorum until the end of the 3rd century.

The fort was destroyed by the Goths in the second half of the 3rd century and then rebuilt under Aurelian and Probus. Another two reconstructions of the fort on the same plan took place in the early 5th and the early 6th centuries until around 596 CE when it was destroyed again. After this, only a portion of it, a fortlet, was maintained and occupied until around 620 CE when this too was abandoned. During this late Roman stage the location is noted in Notitiae Episcopatuum as the see of a bishop and had a small church.

=== Byzantine times ===
The fort was reused by the Byzantines in the 10th century. It also hosted civilians, with more than 340 sunken-floor houses discovered so far inside the walls from that period.

In the spring of 1036, an invasion of the Pechenegs devastated large parts of the region, destroying the forts at Capidava and Dervent and burning the settlement in Dinogetia. In 1046 the Byzantines accepted the settling of Pechenegs under Kegen in Paristrion as foederati. They established some form of domination until 1059, when Isaac I Komnenos reconquered Dobruja.

== Description ==
The site on a massive rock standing on the Danube provided a large surveillance area. The massif also had a natural moat starting from the Danube, turning around it on the NE side, almost up to the east corner of the fortified settlement.

The fort played an important role as part of the Moesian Limes and was connected by road to Carsium, Ulmetum, Basarabi-Murfatlar and Cernavodă.

The location of Capidava is verified by an inscription mentioning a vexillatio Capidabesium and on the measurements made on the ground, following the distance indicated in the Tabula Peutingeriana.

The fort is rectangular with NW-SE sides of 105 x 127 m (1.33 ha) with walls over 2 m thick and 5–6 m high. It had 7 towers over 10 m, 3 of which are rectangular, 2 shaped as a quarter of a circle and 2 intermediate towers in the shape of a horseshoe (U). The fort also had a gate 2.5 m wide on the SE side that was the link to the rest of the territory, and a strategic outlet on the SW side of the tower towards the Danube, where the port used to be.

The fort was also provided with a port including a wharf below the water, and storage and other annexes on the upper terrace, as well as with thermae (public bath house) outside the precinct walls, to the south-east. The port was a station of the fleet Classis Flavia Moesica whose main base was at Noviodunum.

To the E and NE of the fortified settlement stretched the tumulus cemetery with rich incineration graves and further to the south with more modest graves.

Human remains in the necropolis have been studied by geneticists.

== Garrison ==
The vexillations and cohorts stationed at the Capidava fort were:

- Legio XI Claudia
- Legio I Italica
- Legio II Herculia
- Cohors I Germanorum
- Cohors I Ubiorum

== Archaeology ==
The ruins at Capidava were known by word of mouth from long ago, as the Turkish village (a military colony) founded in the 18th century under the name of Kale-koy, that is "the village of the fortified settlement". The first scientific explorers of the Dobruja's land, from the end of the 19th century and the beginning of the 20th century were captain Mihai Ionescu-Dobrogeanu and archaeologist Grigore Tocilescu who mentioned the fortification and gathered antiquities from its area.

In an archaeological survey conducted before World War I, Vasile Pârvan identified it and asked Pamfil Polonic Sr. to create a concise plan of the ruins. Right after the war, Pârvan intended to undertake a vast project of archaeological research in Dobrudja likely to be joined by all his pupils in Bucharest and Iași. Starting from 1924 and continuing in 1926 and 1927 they initiated here archaeological excavations, led by one of Vasile Parvan's assistants, Grigore Florescu, later a lecturer in epigraphy and antiquities with the Faculty of Letters of the University of Bucharest. Grigore Florescu led the researches at Capidava until 1960, when he died on the archaeological site of Drobeta. Until 1954 he worked alone, helped from time to time by his students. Between 1949 and 1954, the excavations at Capidava as well as other field research on the Roman period were interrupted.

The most important monuments uncovered at Capidava include epigraphical and sculptural ones, and also pottery: vessels, amphorae, clay buckets, jars, bowls, lamps. At the same time, they uncovered metal, bone, glass, stone, earth artifacts and coins. The coins date from the time of John I Tzimiskes, Basil II, Constantine VIII, and Theodora. Of the total of almost 50 epigraphic monuments uncovered 25 are funerary steles, and the rest are altars, honorary or simple votives. The sculptural monuments uncovered number 15 and are capitals, a hand, a shaft-column, a leg, a serpent, an eagle.

In 1969, in the ancient Geto-Dacian settlement of Capidava that subsequently become a Roman fortress, it was discovered a pitcher (of local make, in the Roman-Byzantine tradition) which – beside the sign of the cross and the Greek alphabet – carries the name Petre (a common name in the Danube valley, interpreted as Romanian by some Romanian historians).

== Tourism ==
Capidava fortified settlement is a tourist attraction in Dobruja area, next to Hârșova and Histria. It can be reached through the road from Hârșova (E61), or the road from Cernavodă (Fetești-Cernavodă).

Visitors can see the impressive precinct wall, the fortified settlement gate with a tower, the trajectory of the tower foundations in the shape of horseshoes. In the south part of the fortified settlement along 1/3 of its length one can see the foundation of the defensive wall and late fort, as well as the trajectory of the ditch protecting it. In this sector was uncovered the building of the guards. Inside the fortified settlement one can look at several buildings raised around a private square, fitted with porches, as well as access paths and sewerage canals. Out of 8 dolia (doliare opus) - a general term for rough pottery artifacts, brick ones, tile ones, sewerage pipes - 3 were left.

The Stone Ring Island

Next to Capidava on the Danube is an island that only comes to surface for a few summer months when the Danube river dries. The 2-kilometer-wide island is not present on any map. Science fiction fans started organizing the Atlantykron Summer academy, which gathers people who are passionate about astronomy and science fiction.

== Gallery ==
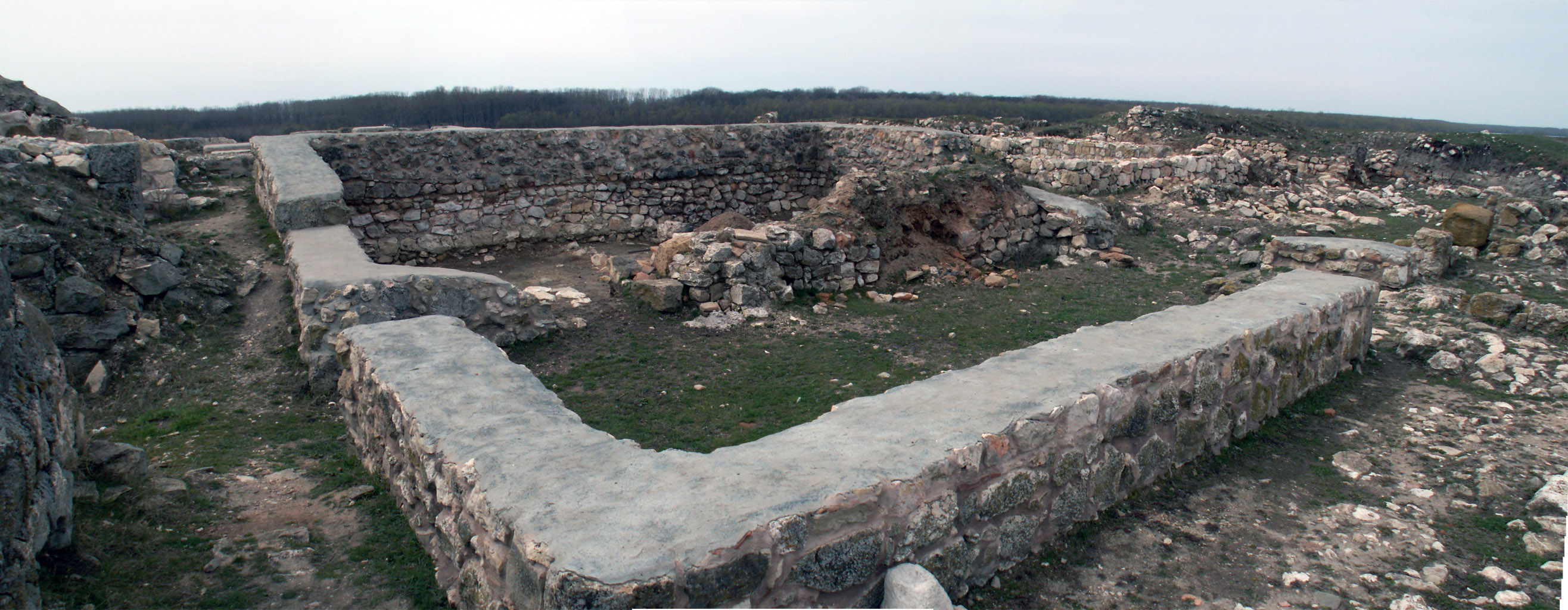

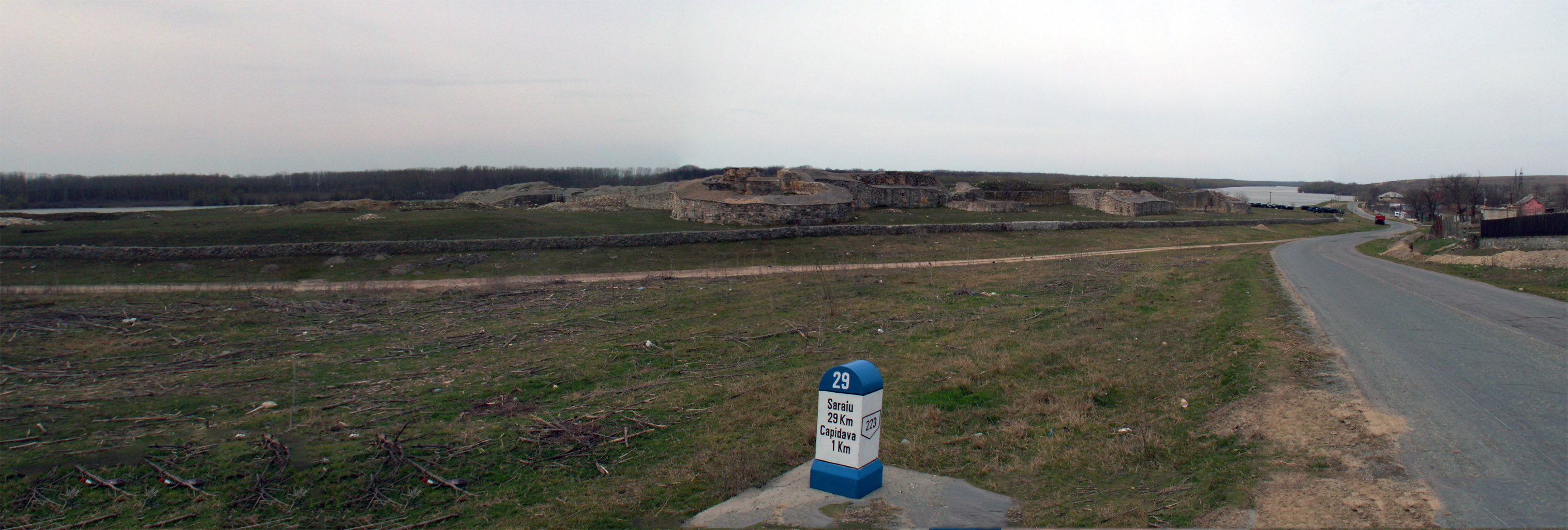

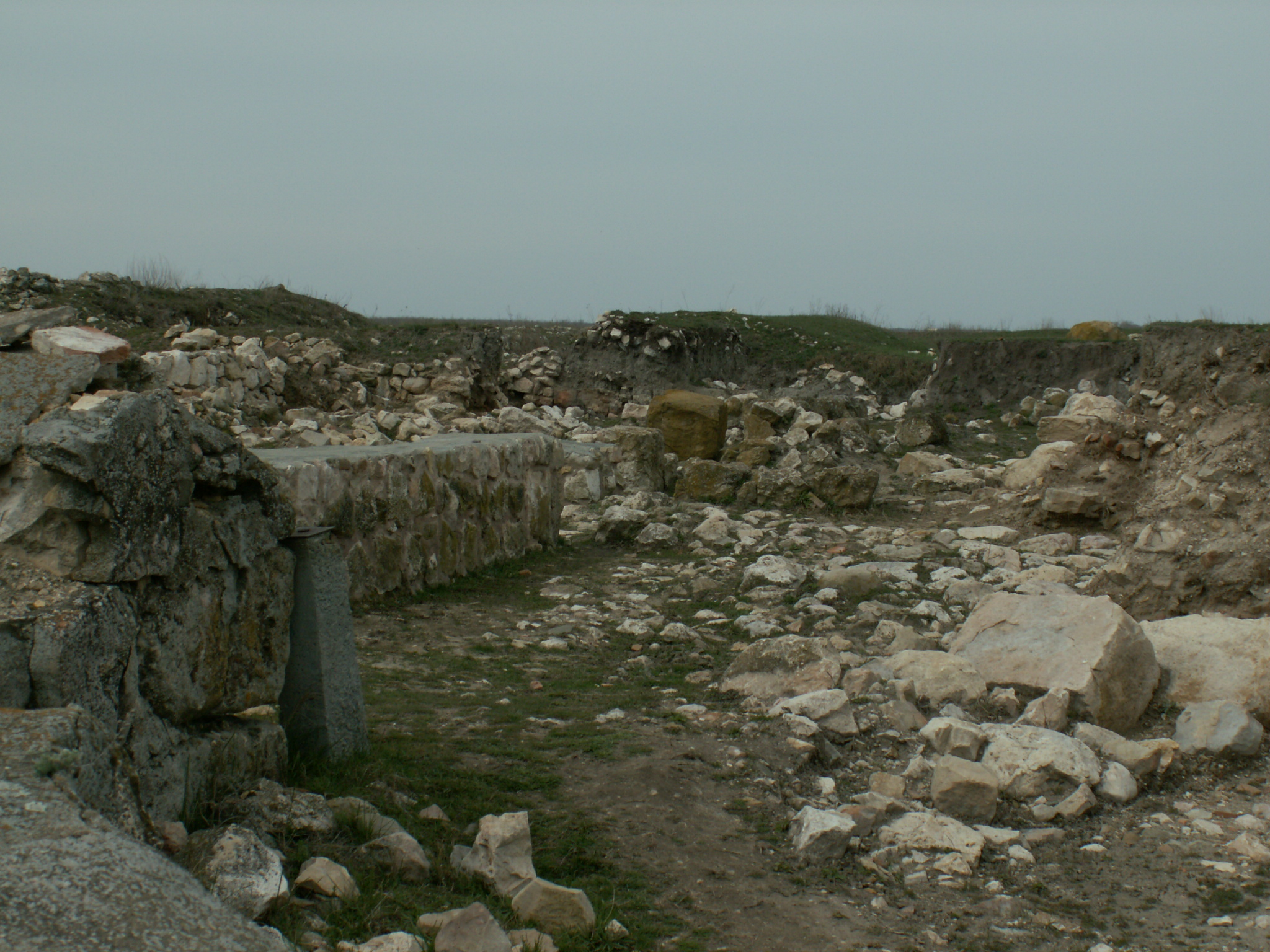

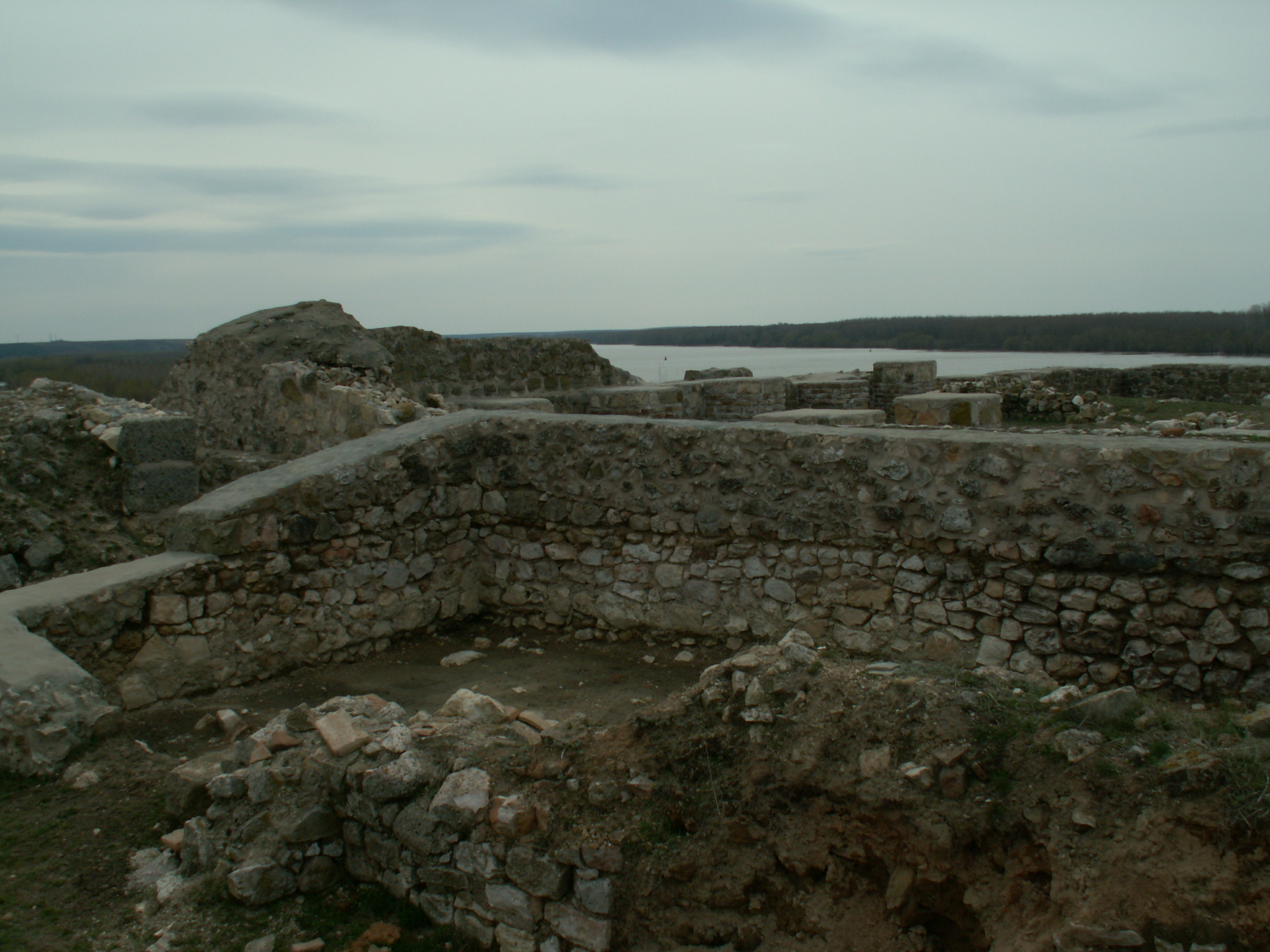

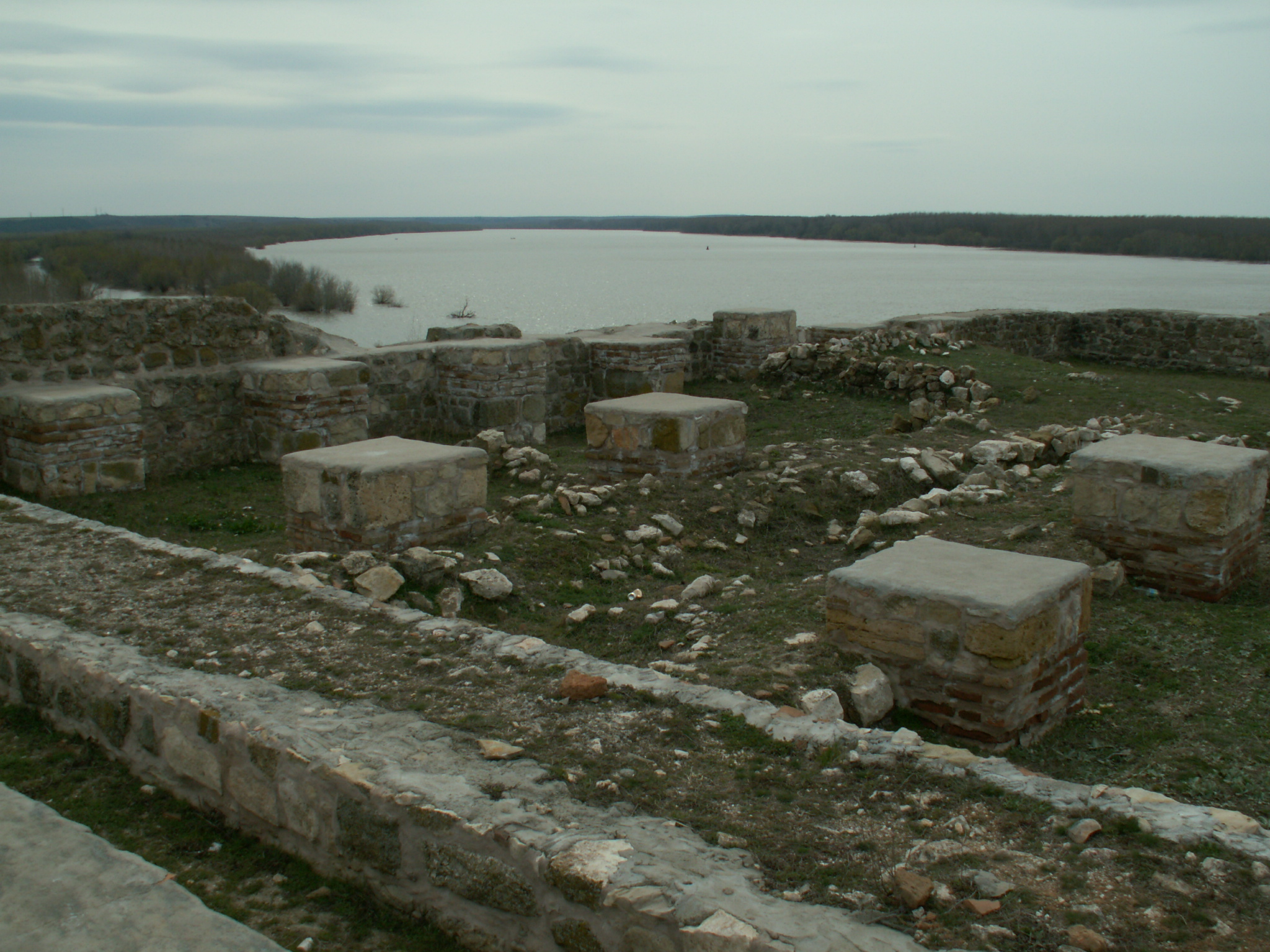

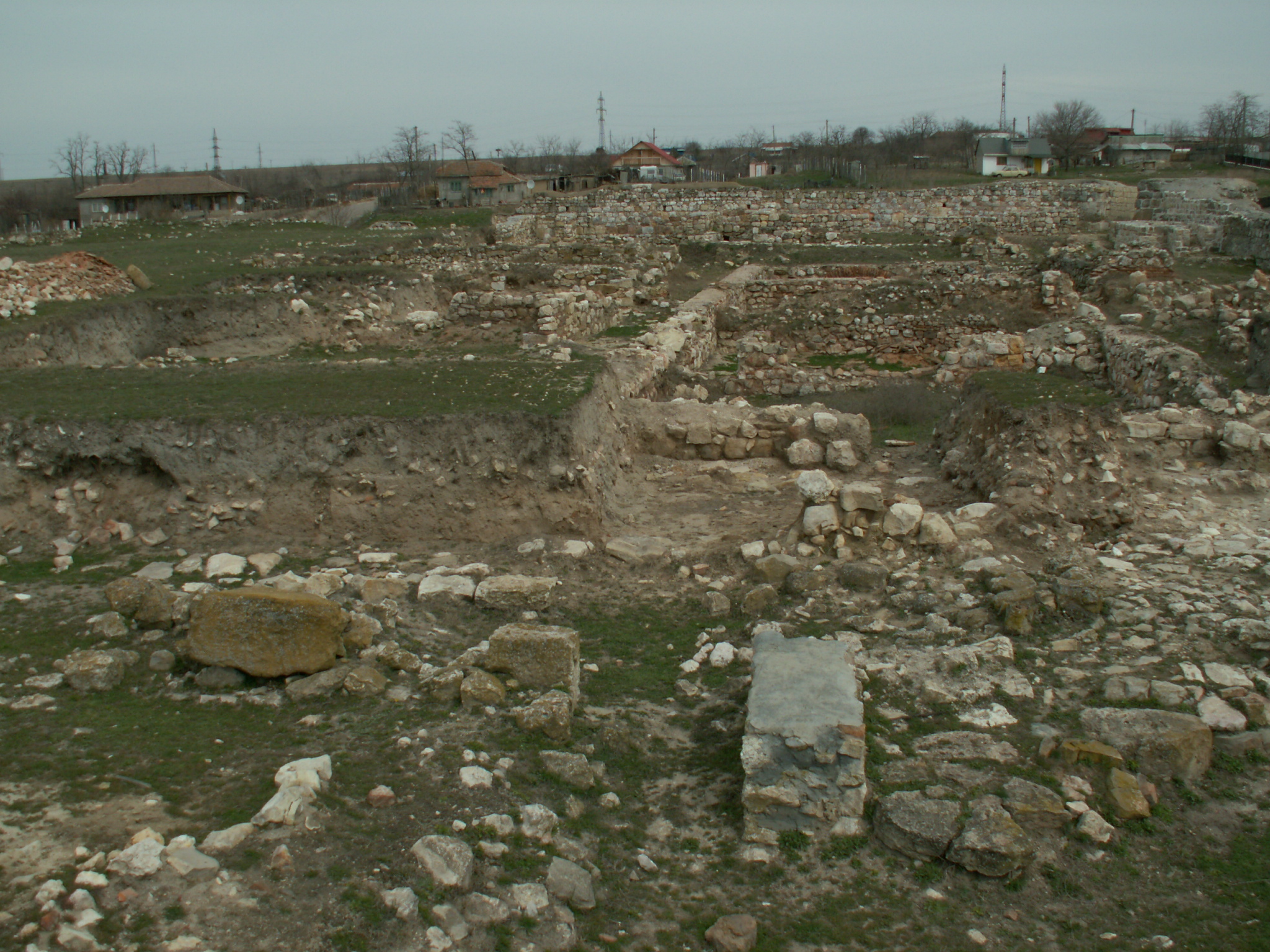

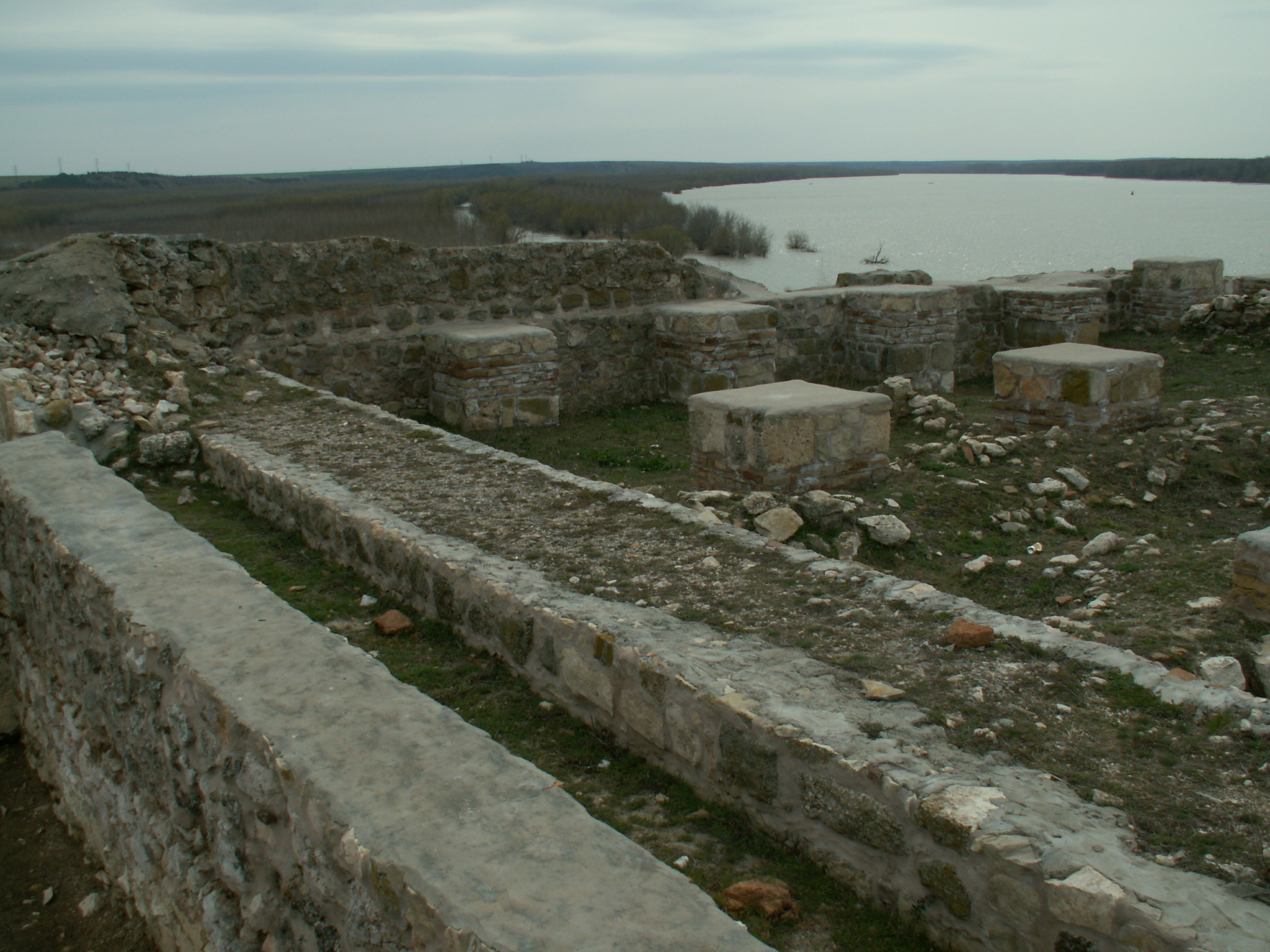

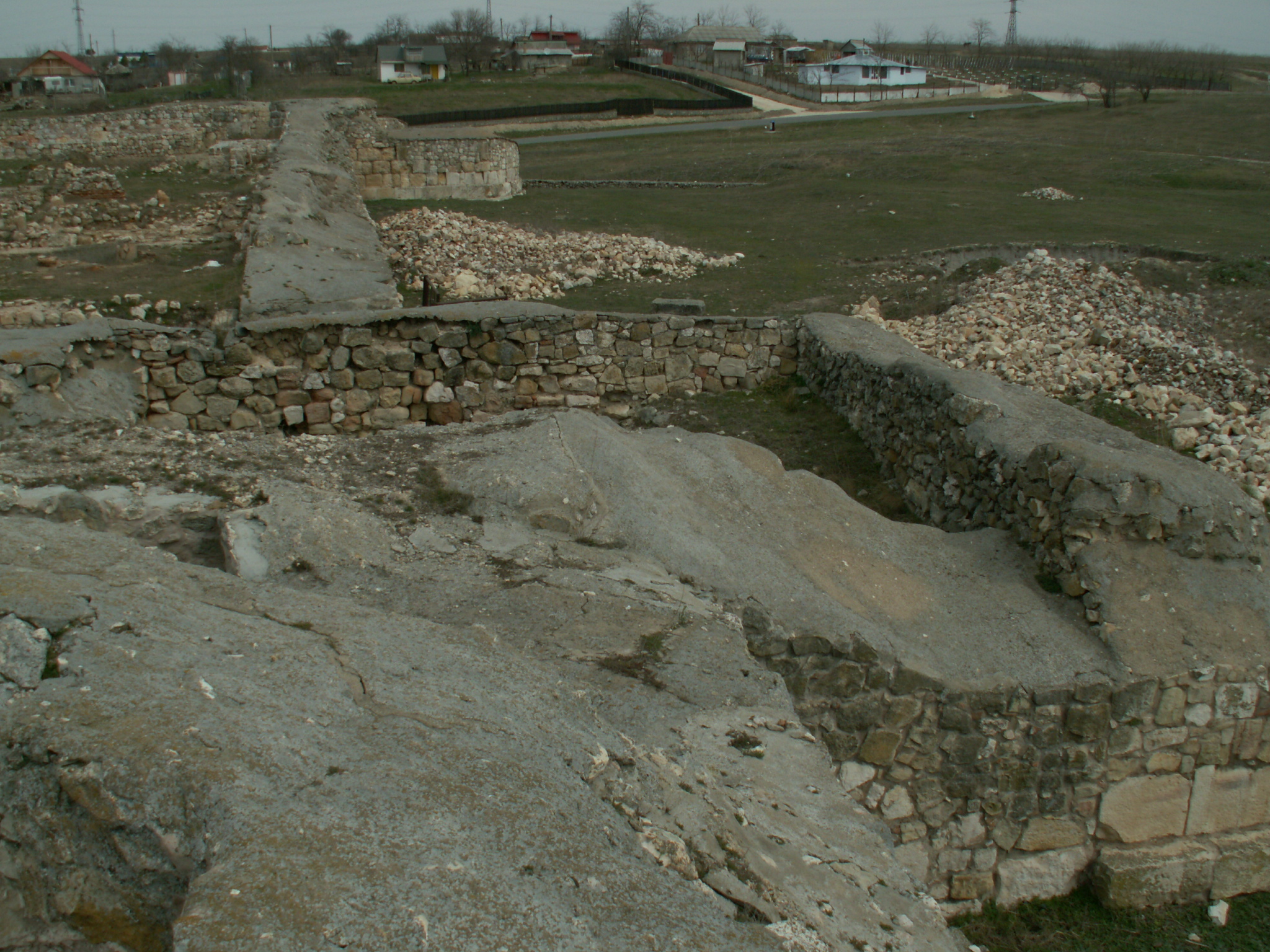

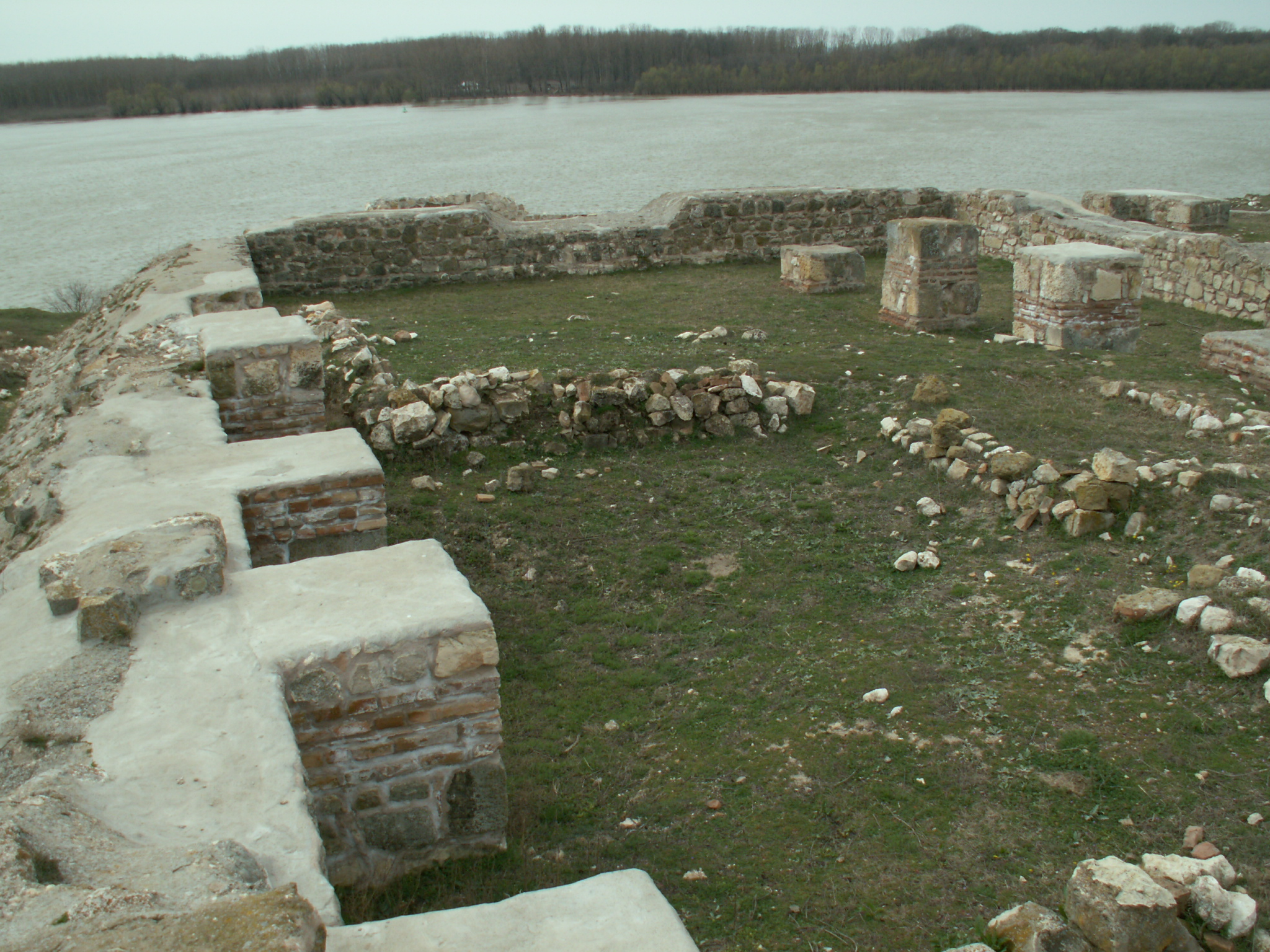

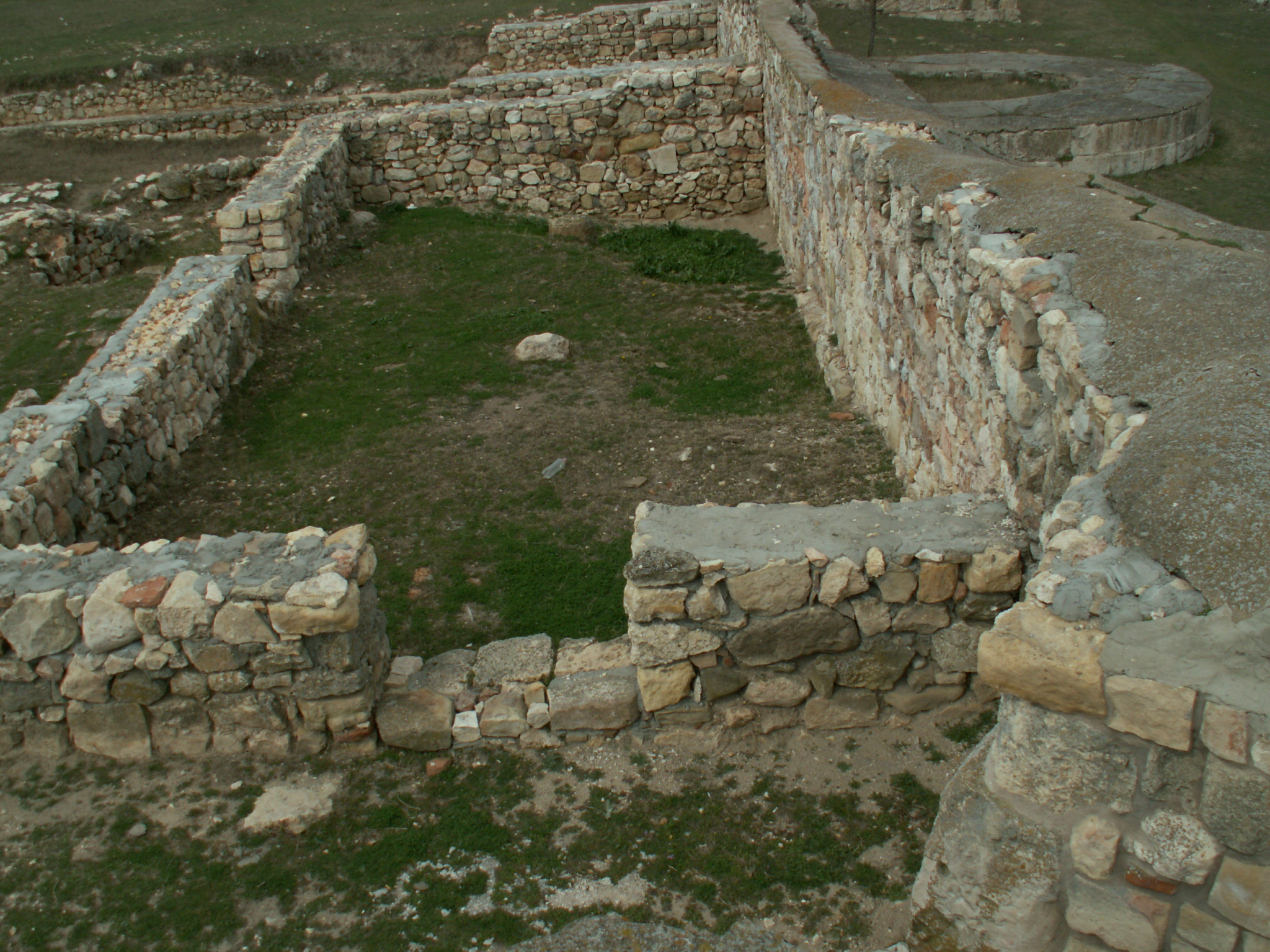

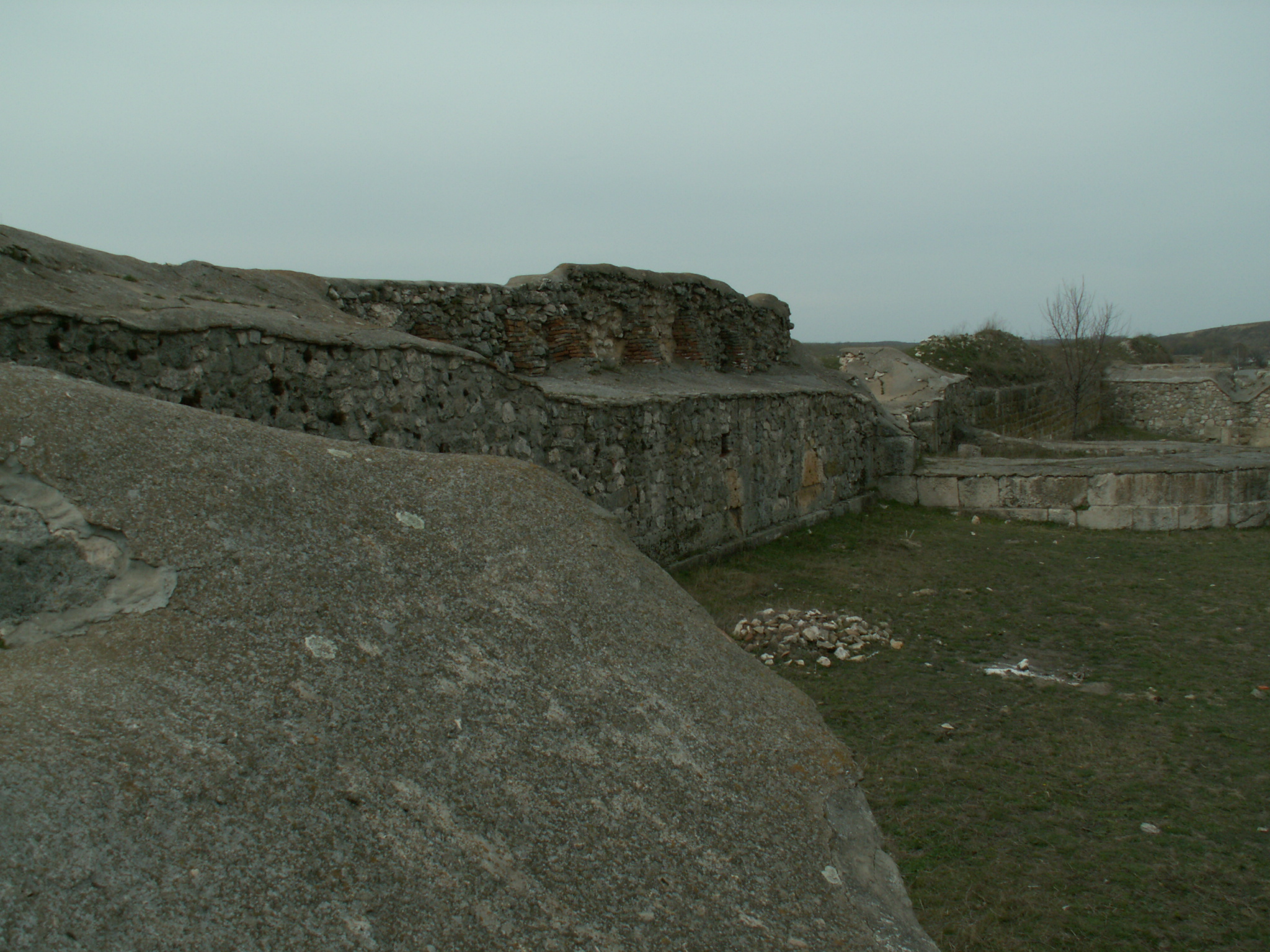

== See also ==
- Dacia
- List of ancient towns in Scythia Minor
- List of ancient cities in Thrace and Dacia
- List of castra
- Dacian davae
