= Gu Tan =

Official of the state of Eastern Wu (c. 205–246)

- 顧譚

Minister of Ceremonies (太常)
- In office 244 – 245
- Monarch: Sun Quan
- Chancellor: Lu Xun

Master of Writing in the Selection Bureau (選曹尚書)
- In office 242 – 244
- Monarch: Sun Quan
- Chancellor: Gu Yong
- Preceded by: Xue Zong

Commandant of Equipage (奉車都尉)
- In office ?–?
- Monarch: Sun Quan
- Chancellor: Gu Yong

Personal details
- Born: c. 205
- Died: c. 246 (aged 41) Jiaozhi
- Relations: Gu Cheng (brother); see also Gu clan of Wu
- Parents: Gu Shao (father); Sun Ce's daughter (mother)
- Occupation: Official
- Courtesy name: Zimo (子默)

Gu Tan (c. 205–246), courtesy name Zimo, was an official of the state of Eastern Wu during the Three Kingdoms period of China.

== Family background ==
Gu Tan's ancestral home was in Wu County, Wu Commandery, which is present-day Suzhou, Jiangsu. The Gu clan, which he was from, was one of the four most influential clans in Wu Commandery and also in the Jiangdong region at the time. (Note: The four great clans of Wu Commandery were the Gu (顧), Lu (陸), Zhu (朱) and Zhang (張) clans. The four great clans of the Jiangdong region were the Gu (顧), Lu (陸), Yu (虞) and Wei (魏) clans. Some notable members from each clan were: Gu Yong, Gu Shao and Gu Tan of the Gu clan; Lu Xun, Lu Ji and Lu Kai of the Lu clan; Zhu Huan and Zhu Ju of the Zhu clan; Zhang Wen of the Zhang clan; Yu Fan of the Yu clan; and Wei Teng (魏騰) of the Wei clan.)

Gu Tan's father, Gu Shao, served as the Administrator (太守) of Yuzhang Commandery (豫章郡; around present-day Nanchang, Jiangxi) under the warlord Sun Quan in the late Eastern Han dynasty. Gu Tan's grandfather, Gu Yong, was the second Imperial Chancellor of the state of Eastern Wu, founded by Sun Quan in the Three Kingdoms period after the fall of the Eastern Han dynasty. Gu Tan's mother was a daughter of Sun Ce, Sun Quan's elder brother and predecessor as the warlord ruling over the Jiangdong territories in the late Eastern Han dynasty.

== Early career ==
Gu Tan started his career before he reached adulthood (before the age of 20) as one of four close attendants of Sun Deng, the eldest son and heir apparent of Sun Quan, the ruler of the Eastern Wu state. The other three were Zhuge Ke, Zhang Xiu and Chen Biao.

After Sun Quan declared himself emperor in 229 and designated Sun Deng as his crown prince, the four attendants were promoted to commandants under various titles. Gu Tan became Commandant Who Upholds Righteousness (輔正都尉) and continued playing a supporting role to Sun Deng. Among his four attendants, Sun Deng favoured and trusted Zhuge Ke and Gu Tan the most, and he regarded them more highly than others such as Fan Shen (范慎), Xie Jing (謝景) and Yang Hui (羊徽).

When Sun Deng ordered his Palace Attendant Hu Zong (胡綜) to write a commentary on four of his advisers in 229, Hu Zong wrote that Gu Tan was excellent at recognising opportunities and having deep and detailed thoughts. After Hu Zong made his commentary public, Yang Dao (羊衜) commented to Hu in private on the four's shortcomings; Yang's criticism of Gu Tan was that "Zimo (Gu's courtesy name) is smart but ruthless." Later, Yang's criticism of the four became known to them, estranging them from Yang. However, eventually all four failed at politics, causing the people of Wu to comment that Yang's criticisms were valid.

== Mid career ==
During the Chiwu era (238–251) of Sun Quan's reign, Gu Tan replaced Zhuge Ke as Left Regional Governor (左節度). When Gu Tan first started writing memorials and reports to Sun Quan upon entering office, Sun Quan was so impressed with his writings that he even delayed meals to read what Gu Tan wrote, and pointed out that Gu Tan wrote better than Xu Xiang (徐詳), one of his palace attendants. Sun Quan favoured Gu Tan for his talents so much that he awarded him several gifts and had special meetings with him.

Whenever Gu Tan read documents, he could easily spot mistakes simply by browsing through quickly; his subordinates were very impressed with him. He was subsequently given an additional appointment as a Commandant of Equipage (奉車都尉).

At the time, Xue Zong, who was serving as Master of Writing in the Selection Bureau (選曹尚書; the equivalent of present-day human resources director) in the Wu government, decided to give up his position to Gu Tan. He wrote to Sun Quan: "(Gu) Tan is focused, meticulous, knowledgeable and detail-oriented. He is also a talented individual and a highly regarded figure among his colleagues. I am afraid that I cannot perform better than him." Sun Quan approved Xue Zong's recommendation and replaced him with Gu Tan.

== Late career ==
Around 244, some months after his grandfather's death, Gu Tan was appointed Minister of Ceremonies (太常) in the Wu imperial court. Sun Quan also put him in charge of supervising the imperial secretariat – a task that his grandfather used to do as Imperial Chancellor.

Around the 240s, there was a power struggle between two of Sun Quan's sons over the succession to their father's throne. On one hand, Sun Quan had already designated his third son Sun He as the crown prince in 242 to replace Sun Deng, who died the year before. On the other hand, he also favoured his fourth son Sun Ba, the Prince of Lu, and treated him exceptionally well. Sun Ba, knowing that their father favoured him, started fighting with his brother over the position of crown prince. Sun Quan's subjects also split into two factions – each supporting either of the two princes. (Note: See Sun He#Succession struggle against Sun Ba and deposal for details.)

Gu Tan believed that Sun He was the rightful heir apparent so he wrote a memorial to Sun Quan to urge him to follow Confucian rules of propriety in the way he treated his sons. He argued that Sun He, as the crown prince, was of a higher status and should therefore receive greater honours and privileges as compared to Sun Ba. He also quoted historical examples to make his case that rulers should make a clear distinction between their heir apparent and other sons.

Sun Ba bore a grudge against Gu Tan after learning that he wrote this memorial.

== Conflict with the Quans ==
Around the time, Quan Ji (全寄), the second son of the general Quan Cong, was a close aide of Sun Ba. Gu Tan did not get along well with Quan Ji because of the latter's behaviour, which he deemed immoral.

Earlier in the summer of 241, Quan Cong had led Wu forces into battle at Quebei (芍陂; south of present-day Shou County, Anhui) against Wei forces led by Wang Ling. The battle did not go well for the Wu side initially, and they lost five units to the Wei forces. Gu Tan's friend Zhang Xiu and brother Gu Cheng, who were serving in the Wu army at the time, led their units to resist the Wei forces and managed to halt their advance. Quan Cong's eldest son Quan Xu (全緒) and relative Quan Duan (全端), who were also serving in the Wu army, led their troops to attack the Wei forces after they stopped advancing, and succeeded in driving them back.

After the battle, when Sun Quan was giving rewards to his officers, he deemed Zhang Xiu and Gu Cheng's contributions greater than those of Quan Xu and Quan Duan because he believed that it was more difficult to halt the enemy advance than to drive back the enemy. As a result, he promoted Zhang Xiu and Gu Cheng to the rank of General, while Quan Xu and Quan Duan were respectively promoted to Lieutenant-General and Major-General only. Due to this incident, the Quans bore a grudge against Gu Cheng and Zhang Xiu and, by extension, against Gu Tan as well.

== Exile and death ==
The Quans later found an opportunity to report Zhang Xiu, Gu Cheng and Gu Tan for committing serious offences. They claimed that Zhang Xiu and Gu Cheng had secretly collaborated with Chen Xun (陳恂), a staff officer in the Wu army during the Battle of Quebei, to make false submissions about their contributions during the battle. As a result, Zhang Xiu and Gu Cheng were arrested and thrown into prison, while Gu Tan was implicated in the case because of his relationship with them. Sun Quan was reluctant to find them guilty so he thought of a plan to appease the Quans without convicting Gu Tan, Gu Cheng and Zhang Xiu.

During an imperial court session, Sun Quan ordered Gu Tan to publicly apologise for the mistake. He expected Gu Tan to do so, after which he could then pardon and release the three of them. However, Gu Tan refused to apologise and he told Sun Quan: "Your Majesty, how can you let baseless accusations have their way?" Later on, an official accused Gu Tan of showing great disrespect towards the emperor when he protested his innocence, and argued that Gu Tan should be punished by execution. Sun Quan took into consideration that Gu Tan's grandfather Gu Yong had rendered meritorious service in the past, and decided to reduce Gu Tan's punishment from execution to exile.

Gu Tan, along with his brother Gu Cheng and Zhang Xiu, were exiled to the remote Jiao Province in the south. When he was in exile, Gu Tan wrote a 20-chapter book, Xin Yan (新言; New Arguments), to express his frustration and lament at his own plight. After spending two years in exile, he died at the age of 41 in Jiaozhi.

== See also ==
- Lists of people of the Three Kingdoms
