= Gu Hui =

Gu Hui, may refer to:

- Gu Hui (politician), official serving under the warlord Sun Quan in the late Eastern Han dynasty of China
- Gu Hui (general), general of the People's Liberation Army (PLA) who served as Commander of the Nanjing Military Region
