= Xue Xu =

Eastern Wu official and general (died c. 271)

- 薛珝

General Who Awes the South (威南將軍)
- In office ? – c. 271
- Monarch: Sun Hao

Court Architect (將作大匠)
- In office 267 – ?
- Monarch: Sun Hao

General of the Household for All Purposes (五官中郎將)
- In office ?–?
- Monarch: Sun Xiu

Personal details
- Born: Unknown
- Died: c. 271
- Relations: Xue Ying (brother)
- Parent: Xue Zong (father)
- Occupation: Military general, politician

Xue Xu (died c. 271) was a Chinese military general and politician of the state of Eastern Wu during the Three Kingdoms period of China.

== Life ==
Xue Xu's ancestral home was in Zhuyi County (竹邑縣), Pei Commandery (沛郡), which is around present-day Suzhou, Anhui. He was the eldest son of Xue Zong, a notable official and scholar of the Eastern Wu state.

During the reign of the third Wu emperor Sun Xiu (r. 258–264), Xue Xu held the position of General of the Household for All Purposes (五官中郎將) in the Wu government. Sun Xiu once sent him as an ambassador to Wu's ally state, Shu Han. After observing the conditions in Shu, he predicted that Shu would fall soon. His prediction came true in 263 when Shu was conquered by Wei, the rival state of both Wu and Shu.

In 267, during the reign of the fourth and last Wu emperor Sun Hao, Xue Xu was appointed as Court Architect (將作大匠) and tasked with overseeing the construction of the mausoleum and memorial temple of Sun He, the emperor's father.

In c.December 269, when a rebellion broke out in Jiao Province, Sun Hao ordered Xue Xu, who then held the appointment of General Who Awes the South (威南將軍), to lead troops from Jing Province to meet up with another army led by Li Xu (李勖) and Xu Cun (徐存) at Hepu Commandery (合浦郡; northeast of present-day Hepu County, Guangxi) and attack the rebels together. Yu Si, an army supervisor, and Tao Huang, the Administrator of Cangwu Commandery (蒼梧郡), served as Xue Xu's subordinates. However, the army led by Li Xu and Xu Cun never reached their destination because their path was obstructed, so only the army led by Xue Xu was available to fight the rebels. Wu Yan, then a low-ranking official, was taken aback by the sight of Xue Xu's army marching towards Jiaozhi Commandery. Xue Xu heeded a suggestion from Tao Huang to send troops to attack Jiaozhi Commandery via a water route, and bribe Liang Qi (梁奇) and other local elites in Jiaozhi to win them over. In 271, Xue Xu's army conquered Jiaozhi Commandery and retook Jiuzhen (九真) and Rinan (日南) commanderies as well.

After the campaign in Jiao Province, Sun Hao appointed Yu Si as the Inspector (刺史) of Jiao Province, but Yu Si died of illness not long later, so Tao Huang succeeded him. Xue Xu also died on the journey back to the Wu imperial capital, Jianye.

== See also ==
- Lists of people of the Three Kingdoms
