= Valeriu Munteanu =

Valeriu Munteanu may refer to:

- Valeriu Munteanu (philologist) (1921–1999), Romanian philologist, lexicographer, and translator
- Valeriu Munteanu (politician) (born 1980), Moldovan politician
