= Muntean =

Muntean is a Romanian language surname. (Romanian pronunciation: [munˈte̯an]). When transliterated from Russian, it may be spelled as Muntyan. It is commonly found in Romania and Moldova and literally translates as "highlander".

Notable people with the name include:

- Andrei Muntean (born 1993), Romanian artistic gymnast
- Iurie Muntean (born 1972), Moldovan politician
- Markus Muntean (born 1962), Austrian artist
- Paul Muntean (born 1984), Romanian bobsledder
- Petru Muntean, Moldovan politician
- Radu Muntean (born 1971), Romanian film director and screenwriter
- Victoria Muntean (born 1997), French tennis player
- Volodymyr Muntyan (1946–2025), Soviet footballer

== See also ==
- Munteanu
