= Cohors I Germanorum =

Cohors I Germanorum was a Roman auxiliary cohort, at some point carrying the name addition civium Romanorum, marking it as being recruited from Roman citizens. In 243 the cohort was stationed at Calidava/Calidaua (modern day Capidava in Romania).

== See also ==
- List of Roman auxiliary regiments
