= Xue Ying =

Chinese historian, poet and official (died 282)

- 薛瑩

Regular Mounted Attendant (散騎常侍)
- In office 280 – 282
- Monarch: Emperor Wu of Jin

Minister of the Household (光祿勳)
- In office ? – 280
- Monarch: Sun Hao

Left State Historian (左國史)
- In office ?–?
- Monarch: Sun Hao

Commandant of the Left District of Wuchang (武昌左部督)
- In office 273 or before – ?
- Monarch: Sun Hao

Junior Tutor of the Crown Prince (太子少傅)
- In office 269 – ?
- Monarch: Sun Hao

Master of Writing in the Selection Bureau (選曹尚書)
- In office 264?–?
- Monarch: Sun Hao

Left Upholder of the Law (左執法)
- In office 264?–?
- Monarch: Sun Hao

Personal details
- Born: Unknown
- Died: 282
- Relations: Xue Xu (brother)
- Children: Xue Jian (died 323) (Note: Xue Jian has a biography in vol.68 of Book of Jin, which recorded that he died in the same year when Emperor Ming of Jin ascended the throne. According to Sun Gui's (孙晷) biography in the same work, Gui's maternal grandfather was Xue Jian; one of Gui's great-grandfathers was Sun Xiu, grandson of Sun Kuang.)
- Parent: Xue Zong (father)
- Occupation: Historian, poet, politician
- Courtesy name: Daoyan (道言)

Xue Ying (died 282 (Note: While Xue Ying's birth year was not recorded, his father Xue Zong died in 243. Thus, Xue Ying's birth year should be in or before 243.)), courtesy name Daoyan, was a Chinese historian, poet, and politician of the state of Eastern Wu during the Three Kingdoms period (220–280) of China. After the fall of Wu, he continued serving under the Jin dynasty (266–420). His ancestral home was in Zhuyi County (竹邑縣), Pei Commandery (沛郡), which is around present-day Suzhou, Anhui. He was the second son of Xue Zong, a notable official and scholar of Eastern Wu.

== Service under Wu ==
=== Service under Sun Xiu ===
After Sun Xiu ascended the throne, he appointed Yu Si, He Shao, Wang Fan and Xue Ying as Central Regular Mounted Attendants (散騎中常侍). After a few years, Xue Ying resigned his positions due to illness.

=== Service under Sun Hao ===
Early in Sun Hao's reign, he assigned Xue Ying as Left Upholder of the Law (左執法). After an unknown period of time, Xue Ying's position was changed to Master of Writing in the Selection Bureau (選曹尚書). After Sun Hao instated his son Sun Jin as crown prince in February or March 269, Xue Ying was made Junior Tutor of the Crown Prince (太子少傅), a position he held in addition to Master of Writing in the Selection Bureau. (Note: According to Sun Hao's biography in Sanguozhi, he ascended the throne on the same day as Sun Xiu's death, which is the guiwei day of the 7th month of the 7th year of the Yongan era of Sun Xiu's reign. This corresponds to 3 September 264 in the Gregorian calendar. Also in his biography, it was recorded that Sun Jin was made crown prince in the 1st month of the 1st year of the Jianheng era of his reign. This corresponds to 19 Feb to 19 Mar 269 on the Julian calendar.)

When Sun Hao surrendered to the Jin army in 280, Xue Ying helped Sun Hao to draft the surrender documents.

== Service under Jin ==
After Sun Hao's surrender, Xue Ying went to Luoyang. In an audience with Sima Yan (Emperor Wu), the emperor calmly asked Xue Ying, "Why did Sun Hao lose his kingdom?" Xue Ying replied, "When ruling Wu, Sun Hao was close to xiaoren and added punishments indiscriminately. He had no trusted officials or generals and everyone lived in fear. That is how he lost his kingdom." Sima Yan then continued asking about the abilities of the Wu officials who survived the invasion; Xue Ying was able to answer truthfully.

== See also ==
- Lists of people of the Three Kingdoms
