= Xue Zong =

3rd-century Chinese official and scholar (died 243)

- 薛綜

Junior Tutor of the Crown Prince (太子少傅)
- In office 242 – 243
- Monarch: Sun Quan
- Chancellor: Gu Yong

Master of Writing in the Selection Bureau (選曹尚書)
- In office 240 – 242
- Monarch: Sun Quan
- Chancellor: Gu Yong

Supervisor of the Masters of Writing (尚書僕射)
- In office ? – 240
- Monarch: Sun Quan
- Chancellor: Gu Yong

Master of Writing in the Crime Bureau (賊曹尚書)
- In office 232 – ?
- Monarch: Sun Quan
- Chancellor: Gu Yong

Chief Clerk (長史) (under Sun Lü)
- In office 231 – 232
- Monarch: Sun Quan
- Chancellor: Gu Yong

Supervisor of the Internuncios (謁者僕射)
- In office 220s – 231
- Monarch: Sun Quan
- Chancellor: Sun Shao (222–225); Gu Yong (from 225)

General of the Household for All Purposes (五官中郎將)
- In office ?–?

Personal details
- Born: Unknown Suixi County, Anhui
- Died: 243 (Note: Xue Zong's biography in the Sanguozhi recorded that he died in the spring (1st to 3rd months) of the 6th year of the Chiwu era of Sun Quan's reign. The period corresponds to 7 Feb to 5 May 243 in the Julian calendar.)
- Children: Xue Xu; Xue Ying
- Occupation: Poet, politician
- Courtesy name: Jingwen (敬文)

Xue Zong (died 243), courtesy name Jingwen, was a Chinese poet and politician of the state of Eastern Wu during the Three Kingdoms period of China. He was known for his quick wit. On one occasion, when the Shu envoy Zhang Feng (張奉) made fun of the name of his colleague Kan Ze during a feast, he gained somewhat of a measure of revenge by making fun of Shu's name. He was also known for assisting Lü Dai in the pacification of Jiaozhi Commandery (covering parts of present-day western Guangdong, southwestern Guangxi and northern Vietnam). In 233, when Sun Quan considered an ill-advised campaign to the Liaodong Peninsula against the recalcitrant warlord Gongsun Yuan (who had submitted to him and then betrayed him and killed his envoys), Xue Zong was one of the officials who spoke against the campaign, eventually getting Sun Quan to change his mind. Xue Zong had two sons: Xue Ying and Xue Xu.

== Background ==
According to the Wu Lu, Xue Zong was a descendant of Lord Mengchang, a statesman of Qi during the Warring States era, via Lord Mengchang's grandson Tian Guo (田国).

== See also ==
- Lists of people of the Three Kingdoms
