= Cohors I Ubiorum =

Cohors I Ubiorum was a Roman auxiliary cohort. The cohort was at one point or another stationed at Calidava/Calidaua (modern day Capidava in Romania). The Cohors I Ubiorum was likely created during the reign of Augustus, and it is known to have been in existence during the reign of Domitian in the late 1st century AD. The unit likely played a role in maintaining Roman control over the area and in defending the Roman frontier against incursions by Germanic tribes. The cohort likely played a role in maintaining Roman control over the region.

== See also ==
- Roman auxiliaries
- List of Roman auxiliary regiments
