= Eugen Munteanu =

Romanian linguist

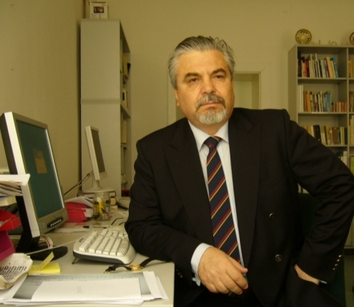
Eugen Munteanu

Eugen Munteanu (born August 18, 1953, in Seimeni, Constanța County) is a Romanian linguist. He specializes in Biblical philology, historical lexicology and the philosophy of language.

He has also edited into Romanian authors such as Alexander von Humboldt, Thomas Aquinas, Antoine de Rivarol, Jean-Jacques Rousseau, Augustine of Hippo, Martin Luther, Eugenio Coseriu, Hans-Georg Gadamer, Jacob Grimm and Ernst Renan.

He has held lecturing, research or guest professorship positions at the Paris-Sorbonne University (Paris IV) (1997-1999), Friedrich-Schiller-Universität Jena (1999–2001), the University of Vienna (2006-2008, & 2009-2010), and director of the "A. Phillipide" Romanian Philology Institute of the Romanian Academy (2009–2013).

Eugen Munteanu is currently professor at the Alexandru Ioan Cuza University, as well as coordinating director of the Biblical-Philological Research Center "Monumenta linguae Dacoromanorum" in Iași, Romania.

He is known as one of Eugenio Coseriu's academic disciples, one of the most activ translators and interpreters of Coseriu in Romania, and has featured favorably in some of the linguist's commentaries.

== Selected works ==
- Sfîntul Augustin, De dialectica/Despre dialectică. Ediție bilingvă, traducere, introducere, note, comentarii și bibliografie ("Saint Augustine. De Dialectica. Bilingual Edition, Translation, Introduction, Notes and Commentaries."), Humanitas, 1991 (ISBN 973-28-0176-X).
- Sfîntul Augustin, De Magistro/Despre Învățător. Ediție bilingvă, traducere, introducere, comentarii, note și bibliografie ("Saint Augustine. De Magistro. Bilingual Edition, Translation, Introduction, Notes and Commentaries."), Institutul European, 1995. (ISBN 973-9148-62-X.)
- Studii de lexicologie biblică ("Studies in Biblical Lexicology"), Iași University Press, 1995 (ISBN 973-9149-41-3).
- Aeterna Latinitas. Mică enciclopedie a gîndirii europene în expresie latină ("Aeterna Latinitas. Small Encyclopedia of European Thought In Latin"), Polirom Press, 1997 (with Lucia Gabriela Munteanu) (ISBN 973-9248-13-6).
- Carmina Burana. Ediție bilingvă comentată ("Carmina Burana. Bilingual Edition and Commentaries"), Polirom Press, Iași, 1998 (with Lucia Gabriela Munteanu) (ISBN 973-683-086-1).
- Thomas de Aquino, De ente et essentia / Despre fiind și esență. Ediție bilingvă, traducere, introducere, note și comentarii ("Thomas de Aquino, De ente et essentia / Of Being and Essence. Bilingual Edition, Bilingual Edition, Translation, Introduction, Notes and Commentaries"), Polirom, 1998 (ISBN 973-683-165-5).
- Jean Jacques Rousseau, Eseu despre originea limbajului. Traducere, introducere, note și comentarii ("Jean Jacques Rousseau. On the Origin of Language. Translation, Introduction, Notes and Commentaries"), Polirom, 1999 (ISBN 973-683-245-7).
- Emanuel Swedenborg, Despre înțelepciunea iubirii conjugale. Versiune românească și postfață, Polirom, 1999 (ISBN 973-683-290-2).
- Sfîntul Augustin, Confessiones / Confesiuni. Ediție bilingvă, traducere din limba latină, introducere și note, Nemira, 2003 (ISBN 973-569-455-7).
- Jacob Grimm / Ernest Renan, Două tratate despre originea limbajului. Versiuni în limba română, cuvânt înainte, introduceri și bibliografie, Iași University Press, 2001 (ISBN 973-8243-05-X).
- Rivarol, Discurs despre universalitatea limbii franceze, urmat de Maxime, reflecții, anecdote, cuvinte de duh. Antologie, traducere, introducere și bibliografie, Institutul European, 2003 (ISBN 973-611-136-9).
- Leviticul. Traducere din limba greacă, introducere, note și comentarii de Eugen Munteanu, in Cristian Bădiliță et alii (coord.), Septuaginta I, (Geneza, Exodul, Leviticul, Numerii, Deuteronomul), Colegiul Noua Europă / Polirom, 2004 (ISBN 973-681-494-7).
- Introducere în lingvistică, Polirom, 2005 (ISBN 973-46-0196-2).
- Odele. Traducere din limba greacă, introducere, note și comentarii, in Cristian Bădiliță et alii (coord.), Septuaginta IV/I (Psalmii, Odele, Proverbele, Ecleziastul, Cântarea cântărilor), Polirom, 2006 (ISBN 973-46-0188-1).
- Cartea înțelepciunii lui Iisus Sirah. Traducere din limba greacă, introducere, note și comentarii, in Cristian Bădiliță et alii (coord.), Septuaginta, IV/II (Iov, Înțelepciunea lui Solomon, Înțelepciunea lui Iisus Sirah, Psalmii lui Solomon), Polirom, 2007 (ISBN 978-973-46-0445-6).
- Wilhelm von Humboldt, Diversitatea structurală a limbilor și influența ei asupra umanității. Versiune românească, introducere, notă asupra traducerii, tabel cronologic, bibliografie și indice, Humanitas, 2008 (ISBN 978-973-50-2013-2).
- Lexicologie biblică românească, Humanitas, 2008 (ISBN 978-973-50-1868-9).
- Eugeniu Coșeriu, Istoria filosofiei limbajului. De la începuturi până la Rousseau. Ediție nouă, augmentată de Jörn Albrecht, cu o remarcă preliminară de Jürgen Trabant, versiune românească și indice de Eugen Munteanu și Mădălina Ungureanu, cu o prefață la ediția românească de Eugen Munteanu, Humanitas, 2011 (ISBN 978-973-50-2961-6).
- Eugeniu Coșeriu, Lingvistica textului. O introducere în hermeneutica textului. Versiune românească și indici de Eugen Munteanu și Ana Maria Prisacaru, cu o postfață de Eugen Munteanu, Editura Universității Alexandru Ioan Cuza, Iași, 2013, 264 p, ISBN 978-973-703-910-1.
- Eugen Munteanu (coord.), Ana-Maria Gînsac, Ana-Maria Minuț, Lucia Gabriela Munteanu, Mădălina Ungureanu, Vechiul Testament – Septuaginta. Versiunea lui Nicolae Spătarul Milescu (Ms. 45 de la Biblioteca Filialei din Cluj a Academiei Române). Ediție de text, prefață, notă asupra ediției, introducere, bibliografie, indice de cuvinte și forme, indice de nume proprii, rezumate în limbile engleză, franceză, germană și rusă, Editura Universității Alexandru Ioann Cuza, Iași, 2016, CCCLXXXIII + 1298 p., ISBN 978-606-714-293-8.
- Viorel Barbu/ Eugen Munteanu, 5 convorbiri despre știință, cultură, creație, Editura Junimea, Iași, 2017, 280 p., ISBN 978-973-37-2060-7.
- Paul Miron – in memoriam 90. Volum întocmit de Eugen Munteanu, Editura Junimea, Iași, 2017, 470 p., ISBN 978-973-37-2005-8.

== Book awards ==
=== Monographs ===
- The Romanian Academy's “Timotei Cipariu” Prize, 1995/1997, awarded for Studii de lexicologie biblică ("Studies in Biblical Lexicology"), Iași University Press, 1995.
- “Book of the Year” Award, National Book Symposium, Chișinău, 1997, for Aeterna latinitas. Mică enciclopedie a gândirii europene în expresie latină ("Aeterna Latinitas. Small Encyclopedia of European Thought In Latin"), Polirom Press, 1997 (with Lucia Gabriela Munteanu).
- The Ministry of Culture's "Best Translation" Prize, awarded at the National Book Symposium, Cluj, 1998, for Carmina Burana. Ediție bilingvă comentată ("Carmina Burana. Bilingual Edition and Commentaries"), Polirom Press, Iași, 1998 (with Lucia Gabriela Munteanu).

=== Collective works ===
- The Romanian Academy's “Timotei Cipariu” Prize, 1989, awarded for H. Tiktin, Rumänisch-Deutsches Wörterbuch, 2. überarbeitete und ergänzte Auflage, hrsg. von Paul Miron, Otto Harrassowitz Verlag, Wiesbaden, 3 vol., 1985–1987.
- The Romanian Academy's “Bogdan Petriceicu Hasdeu” Prize, 1991, for Biblia 1688, Pars. I, Genesis, Iași 1988, Pars II Exodus, incl. in "Monumenta linguae Dacoromanorum", Iași 1991.
- “Book of the Year”, 2004, awarded by “România Literară”, for Septuaginta, vol. I, Polirom, Iași, 2004 (Bădiliță, C., Ed.).
- “Best Foreign Book Editing” Prize, awarded by the Romanian Editors Association, for Septuaginta, vol. I, Polirom, Iași, 2004 (Bădiliță, C., Ed.).
