= Alexandru Munteanu (disambiguation) =

Alexandru Munteanu may refer to:

- Alexandru Munteanu (born 1964), Moldovan economist, professor, businessman and politician
- Alexandru Munteanu (footballer) (born 1987), Romanian footballer
