= Gu Hui (politician) =

3rd-century Chinese Eastern Han dynasty official

- 顧徽

Administrator of Badong (巴東太守) (nominal)
- In office ?–?
- Monarch: Emperor Xian of Han

Commandant Who Upholds Righteousness (輔義都尉)
- In office c. 204–?
- Monarch: Emperor Xian of Han

Registrar (主簿) (under Sun Quan)
- In office c. 200 – c. 204
- Monarch: Emperor Xian of Han

Personal details
- Born: Unknown Suzhou, Jiangsu
- Died: Unknown
- Relations: Gu Yong (brother); Gu Ti (relative); see also Gu clan of Wu
- Children: Gu Yu
- Occupation: Official
- Courtesy name: Zitan (子歎)

Gu Hui (fl. 200s), courtesy name Zitan, was an official serving under the warlord Sun Quan in the late Eastern Han dynasty of China. He was a younger brother of Gu Yong, the second Imperial Chancellor of the state of Eastern Wu founded by Sun Quan in the Three Kingdoms period. (Note: Note that Rafe de Crespigny incorrectly recorded in A Biographical Dictionary of Later Han to the Three Kingdoms (23-220 AD) that Gu Hui was a maternal uncle of Gu Yong. This error probably comes from a misreading of 母弟, which literally reads "mother('s) younger brother" but actually means "younger brother born to the same mother". See the dictionary definition of 母弟.)

== Life ==
Gu Hui was from Wu County, Wu Commandery, which is present-day Suzhou, Jiangsu. His great-grandfather Gu Feng (顧奉) was a former Administrator (太守) of Yingchuan Commandery (潁川郡; around present-day Xuchang, Henan). He was a younger brother of Gu Yong; they were also born to the same mother. In his youth, he travelled around for studies and was known for his oratorical talent.

In the year 200, after Sun Quan succeeded his brother Sun Ce as the warlord ruling over the Jiangdong territories, he heard of Gu Hui's talent and recruited him to serve as his Registrar (主簿).

One day, while taking a stroll in town, Gu Hui saw soldiers escorting a man to the town square for a public execution. After learning that the man was to be executed for stealing 100 coins, he asked them to delay the execution while he rushed to Sun Quan's office to plead for the man's life. He said: "As we are growing our population in preparation for war in the north, we should see this man as someone who can be a soldier. Besides, the amount of money he stole is a small amount. I humbly plead for him to be spared." Sun Quan was so pleased that he approved Gu Hui's request. He then reassigned Gu Hui to work in the east bureau of his office.

Around 204, when Sun Quan received news that the northern warlord Cao Cao was planning to attack the Jiangdong region, he told Gu Hui: "You are someone I trust. Recently, I heard that Cao Cao has the intention of attacking us. I need someone to confirm this. I will send you on this mission." He then commissioned Gu Hui as a Commandant Who Upholds Righteousness (輔義都尉) and sent him as an emissary to meet Cao Cao.

When Cao Cao asked him about the situation in Jiangdong, Gu Hui told him that Jiangdong was a prosperous region. He also told Cao Cao that the Shanyue tribes, who were known for being hostile towards Sun Quan's administration, had been pacified and were even willing to serve in Sun Quan's army. Cao Cao laughed and said: "I have marital ties with Sun Quan. We are now in the same family so we should work together to support the Han dynasty. Why are you telling me all this?" Gu Hui replied: "It is precisely because you, Wise Lord, and my lord have such strong ties and a shared loyalty towards the Han dynasty. I know that you would definitely want to know what is happening in Jiangdong. That is why I decided to tell you." Cao Cao treated Gu Hui generously and sent him back to Jiangdong.

After Gu Hui returned to Jiangdong, Sun Quan asked him what he found out, and so Gu Hui replied: "It is indeed very difficult to assess the intentions of a rival state. However, based on the intelligence I gathered, I know that Cao Cao is at war with Yuan Tan. He has no other designs at the moment."

Sun Quan later appointed Gu Hui as the nominal Administrator of Badong Commandery (巴東郡; around present-day Chongqing), which was not under his control. He also planned to entrust Gu Hui with greater responsibilities, but Gu Hui died shortly after.

== Family ==
Gu Hui's elder brother, Gu Yong, served as the second Imperial Chancellor of the state of Eastern Wu founded by Sun Quan in the Three Kingdoms period after the fall of the Eastern Han dynasty.

Gu Hui's son, Gu Yu (顧裕), had the courtesy name Jize (季則). Already well known since he was a youth, Gu Yu served in the Eastern Wu government and the highest position he held was General Who Guards the East (鎮東將軍).

== See also ==
- Lists of people of the Three Kingdoms
