= Dunăreni =

Dunăreni may refer to several places in Romania:

- Dunăreni, a village in Aliman Commune, Constanța County
- Dunăreni, a village in Goicea Commune, Dolj County
