= Valeriu Munteanu (philologist) =

Romanian philologist (1921 – 1999)

- Born: October 4, 1921
- Died: December 20, 1999 (aged 78); Bucharest, Romania
- Citizenship: Romania
- Education: University of Bucharest
- Occupations: lexicographer, translator, philologist
- Spouse: prof. dr. Sanda Munteanu

Valeriu Munteanu (October 4, 1921 – December 20, 1999) was a Romanian philologist, lexicographer, and translator.

After studying law in Sibiu and Cluj, he studied philology in Bucharest, and Nordic languages in Uppsala, Sweden.

He translated into Romanian writers such as Hjalmar Bergman, August Strindberg, Artur Lundkvist, Hans Scherfig, Herman Bang, Sigrid Undset, Knut Hamsun.

== Orders, Prizes ==
- Knight of the Swedish Order of the Polar Star 1st Class (1981)
- the Danish Order of the Dannebrog
- Swedish Academy's translation prize (1981)
- Romanian Writers' Union translation prize (1997)

== Works ==
- Dansk-Rumensk Ordbog (Romanian-Danish dictionary) (co-ed.), Dansk Historisk Håndbogsforlag/Editura Științifică și Enciclopedică, 1984 (cca 40.000 words). A second edition was published.
- Ghid de conversație român-suedez (Swedish-Romanian phrase book), (Ed. Sport-Turism, București, 1977)
- Dansk-rumænsk parlør (Danish-Romanian phrase book), (Ed. Sport-Turism, București, 1980)
- Dicționar suedez-român (Swedish-Romanian dictionary), (Ed. Polirom, Iași, 2002)
- Dicționar danez-român (Danish-Romanian dictionary), (Ed. Polirom, Iași, 2003)

== Bibliography ==
- (in German) Valeriu Munteanu. Der Mensch und der Hochschullehrer ("Valeriu Munteanu. The Man and University Lecturer"), in: Guțu, G./Sandu, D. (ed.): Zur Geschichte der Germanistik in Rumänien (II). Der Bukarester Lehrstuhl. (Ed. Universității București, 2005)
