= Sun Shao (Changxu) =

Chinese Eastern Wu state official (163-225)

- 孫邵

Imperial Chancellor (丞相)
- In office November 222 – June or July 225
- Monarch: Sun Quan
- Succeeded by: Gu Yong

General Who Awes Distant Lands (威遠將軍)
- In office ? – June or July 225
- Monarch: Sun Quan

Chief Clerk (長史) (under Sun Quan)
- In office ?–?

Administrator of Lujiang (盧江太守)
- In office ?–?

Personal details
- Born: 163 Weifang, Shandong
- Died: June or July 225 (aged 62)
- Occupation: Politician
- Courtesy name: Changxu (長緒)
- Peerage: Marquis of Yangxian (陽羨侯)

Sun Shao (163 – June or July 225), courtesy name Changxu, posthumously known as Marquis Su of Yangxian (陽羨肃侯), was the first Imperial Chancellor of Eastern Wu from 222 to 225 during the Three Kingdoms period of China. He was not related to the imperial family of Eastern Wu even though he shared the same family name as them. (Note: Sun Shao was from Beihai State while Sun Jian was from Wu Commandery.)

== Life ==
Described as a man about eight chi tall, Sun Shao was from Beihai State (北海國), a commandery centred around present-day Weifang, Shandong. He started his career as an Officer of Merit (功曹) in his home commandery sometime between 189 and 196, when Kong Rong was serving as Beihai State's Chancellor. Kong Rong called Sun Shao "a talent capable of serving in the imperial court".

In the mid-190s, Sun Shao left Beihai State and travelled south to the Jiangdong region, where he became a subordinate of Liu Yao, the Governor of Yang Province (which covered the Jiangdong region). In 200 CE, he came into the service of Sun Quan, the warlord who controlled the territories in Jiangdong. On several occasions, he advised Sun Quan to pay tribute and swear nominal allegiance to Emperor Xian (r. 189–220), the figurehead emperor of the Eastern Han dynasty. Sun Quan heeded his advice. Sun Shao also served as the Administrator (太守) of Lujiang Commandery (廬江郡; around present-day Lu'an, Anhui) and as a Chief Clerk (長史) under Sun Quan when the latter held the nominal appointment of General of Chariots and Cavalry (車騎將軍) of the Han Empire.

Following the end of the Eastern Han dynasty in 220, Sun Quan initially swore allegiance to Cao Pi, the emperor of the Cao Wei state which replaced the Eastern Han. In return, Cao Pi made Sun Quan a vassal king and granted him the title "King of Wu" (吳王). However, in 222, Sun Quan broke ties with Cao Pi and declared independence. He appointed Sun Shao as the Imperial Chancellor (丞相) of his kingdom and enfeoffed him as the Marquis of Yangxian (陽羨侯). Sun Shao also held the nominal appointment of General Who Awes Distant Lands (威遠將軍). When he held office as Imperial Chancellor, two officials, Zhang Wen and Ji Yan, wrote memorials to Sun Quan to make accusations against him. It is not known what exactly Sun Shao was accused of. In response, Sun Shao requested Sun Quan to remove him from office, but Sun Quan pardoned him and ordered him to continue serving as Imperial Chancellor.

Sun Shao died sometime between 23 June and 22 July 225 (Note: Sun Quan's biography in the Sanguozhi mentioned that Sun Shao died in the 5th month of the 4th year of the Huangwu era (222–229) in Sun Quan's reign. The 5th month corresponds to 23 June to 22 July 225 in the Gregorian calendar.) at the age of 63 (by East Asian age reckoning). The Eastern Wu court gave him the posthumous name of Su (肃).

== Why Sun Shao does not have a biography in the Sanguozhi ==
Although Sun Shao served as the first Imperial Chancellor (丞相) of Eastern Wu, there is very little information about him recorded in history. For instance, unlike many other notable persons of his time, he does not have a biography in the third-century historical text Records of the Three Kingdoms (Sanguozhi), the authoritative source for the history of the Three Kingdoms period.

The Zhi Lin (志林) recorded that Liu Shengshu (劉聲叔), a polymath, once attempted to explain why Sun Shao did not have a biography in the Sanguozhi. Xiang Jun (項竣) and Ding Fu (丁孚), whom Sun Quan put in charge of writing the history of Eastern Wu, had already written a biography for Sun Shao. However, after coming to the throne, Sun Quan's successor Sun Liang replaced Xiang Jun and Ding Fu with Wei Zhao, who was known to be close to Zhang Wen, one of the two officials who made accusations against Sun Shao. Liu Shengshu speculated that Wei Zhao probably removed the information about Sun Shao when he took over the job of writing the history of Eastern Wu from Xiang Jun and Ding Fu.

== See also ==
- Lists of people of the Three Kingdoms
