= Gu Yong =

State of Eastern Wu Minister and Chancellor (168-243)

- 顧雍

Imperial Chancellor (丞相)
- In office June or July 225 – November or December 243
- Monarch: Sun Quan
- Preceded by: Sun Shao
- Succeeded by: Lu Xun

Minister of Ceremonies (太常)
- In office 225 – June or July 225
- Monarch: Sun Quan

Prefect of the Masters of Writing (尚書令)
- In office 222 – 225
- Monarch: Sun Quan

Minister of Imperial Ancestral Ceremonies (大理奉常)
- In office 222 – 225
- Monarch: Sun Quan

Left Major (左司馬) (under Sun Quan)
- In office ? – 222

Administrator of Kuaiji (會稽太守) (acting)
- In office c. 200–?
- Monarch: Emperor Xian of Han

Chief of Shangyu (上虞長)
- In office ? – c. 200
- Monarch: Emperor Xian of Han

Chief of Qu'e (曲阿長)
- In office ?–?
- Monarch: Emperor Xian of Han

Chief of Lou (婁長)
- In office ?–?
- Monarch: Emperor Xian of Han

Chief of Hefei (合肥長)
- In office ?–?
- Monarch: Emperor Xian of Han

Personal details
- Born: 168 Suzhou, Jiangsu
- Died: November or December 243 (aged 75) (Note: Sun Quan's biography in the Sanguozhi recorded that Gu Yong died in the 11th month of the 6th year of the Chiwu era of Sun Quan's reign. This month corresponds to 29 November to 28 December 243 in the Gregorian calendar.) Nanjing, Jiangsu
- Spouse: Lu Kang's daughter
- Relations: Gu Hui (brother); Gu Ti (relative); see also Gu clan of Wu
- Children: Gu Shao; Gu Yu; Gu Ji
- Occupation: Calligrapher, musician, politician
- Courtesy name: Yuantan (元歎)
- Posthumous name: Marquis Su (肅侯)
- Peerage: Marquis of Liling (醴陵侯)

Gu Yong (168 – November or December 243), courtesy name Yuantan, was the second Imperial Chancellor of the state of Eastern Wu during the Three Kingdoms period of China.

Born in the late Eastern Han dynasty in the Jiangdong region, Gu Yong studied under the tutelage of Cai Yong in his early years and earned high praise from his mentor. He started his career as a county chief and served in various counties throughout Jiangdong. Around the year 200, he came to serve the warlord Sun Quan, who controlled the Jiangdong territories, and performed well in office as an acting commandery administrator. After Sun Quan became the ruler of the independent state of Eastern Wu in 222, Gu Yong steadily rose through the ranks as a minister and ultimately became Imperial Chancellor. He held office for about 19 years from 225 until his death in 243.

== Background and early life ==
Gu Yong was born in Wu County, Wu Commandery, which is present-day Suzhou, Jiangsu, towards the end of the Eastern Han dynasty. His great-grandfather Gu Feng (顧奉) was a former Administrator (太守) of Yingchuan Commandery (潁川郡; around present-day Xuchang, Henan). The Gu clan, which he was from, was one of the four most influential clans in Wu Commandery and also in the Jiangdong region at the time. (Note: The four great clans of Wu Commandery were the Gu (顧), Lu (陸), Zhu (朱) and Zhang (張) clans. The four great clans of the Jiangdong region were the Gu (顧), Lu (陸), Yu (虞) and Wei (魏) clans. Some notable members from each clan were: Gu Yong, Gu Shao and Gu Tan of the Gu clan; Lu Xun, Lu Ji and Lu Kai of the Lu clan; Zhu Huan and Zhu Ju of the Zhu clan; Zhang Wen of the Zhang clan; Yu Fan of the Yu clan; and Wei Teng (魏騰) of the Wei clan.)

Sometime in the 180s, when Cai Yong was living in Wu Commandery, Gu Yong met him and learnt calligraphy and music from him. While studying under Cai Yong's tutelage, Gu Yong showed that he was not only diligent and focused in his studies, but also fast-learning and easily teachable. As a result, he earned high praise from Cai Yong, who told him: "You will definitely reach the pinnacle of success. I offer you a new name – the same as mine." Gu Yong thus changed his given name to "Yong" (雍) which was similar to Cai Yong's "Yong" (邕). He also adopted "Yuantan" (元歎), which literally means "top praise", as his courtesy name to reflect the high praise he received from his mentor.

The Administrator of Wu Commandery heard of Gu Yong's fame and recommended him as a talent to join the civil service. Shortly after he reached the age of adulthood, he started serving as the chief of Hefei County before he was reassigned to Lou County (婁縣; north of present-day Kunshan, Jiangsu), Qu'e County (曲阿縣; present-day Danyang, Jiangsu) and then Shangyu County (上虞縣; in present-day Shaoxing, Zhejiang).

== Early career under Sun Quan ==
When the Han central government granted the warlord Sun Quan the nominal appointment of Administrator of Kuaiji Commandery (around present-day Shaoxing, Zhejiang) around 200 or 201, Sun Quan in turn appointed Gu Yong as his deputy and the acting Administrator to help him govern Kuaiji Commandery because he was based in Wu Commandery at the time. During his tenure, Gu Yong pacified and integrated rebels and minorities under his jurisdiction and maintained peace. He earned much respect from his subordinates and the people alike for his good performance. After holding office for many years, he was reassigned to be a Left Major (左司馬) under Sun Quan.

In 222, after Sun Quan became the King of Wu (吳王), he promoted Gu Yong to the positions of Minister of Imperial Ancestral Ceremonies (大理奉常) and Prefect of the Masters of Writing (尚書令) in his kingdom. He also enfeoffed Gu Yong as the Marquis of Yangsui District (陽遂鄉侯). As Gu Yong went straight back to his office after his conferment ceremony, his family did not know that he had been made a marquis so they were very surprised when they found out later.

In 225, Gu Yong fetched his mother from his hometown in Wu County (吳縣; present-day Suzhou, Jiangsu) to live with him in Wuchang (武昌; present-day Ezhou, Hubei), the imperial capital of Eastern Wu. When she arrived, Sun Quan greeted and welcomed her in person, and later paid his respects to her in his imperial court in the presence of all his subjects. Sun Quan's heir apparent, Sun Deng, also greeted her. In the same year, Gu Yong was reassigned to serve as Minister of Ceremonies (太常) and promoted from a district marquis to a county marquis under the title "Marquis of Liling" (醴陵侯). Later that year, he succeeded Sun Shao as the Imperial Chancellor of Eastern Wu and took charge of the imperial secretariat. Yi Zhongtian commented that the appointment of Gu Yong and later Lu Xun as Chancellor was the compromise between the local Jiangdong nobility and the ruling clique of Eastern Wu (mostly came from other regions), as both Gu and Lu descended from notable and powerful Jiangdong clans. Sun Quan was eager to grant more power shares for the Jiangdong nobility as long as it enabled the Sun royal family to maintain the overall control.

== As Imperial Chancellor of Eastern Wu ==
While holding office as Imperial Chancellor, Gu Yong managed the administration well. He assigned his subordinates to their respective appointments in a way which not only generally suited their preferences, but also allowed them to put their talents to good use. He also often went on inspection tours to assess local conditions and see if policy changes could be made to improve the people's lives. When he had new ideas, he secretly proposed them to Sun Quan. If his ideas were approved and implemented, he gave the credit to Sun Quan instead of claiming it for himself. If his ideas were rejected, he kept quiet and did not reveal anything. As a result, Sun Quan trusted and regarded him highly.

=== A reticent person ===
Although Gu Yong always maintained a polite and respectful tone when he spoke up on issues in the imperial court, he was also known for standing by his principles and holding his ground when he had to. On one occasion, when Sun Quan sought feedback from his subjects on policy matters, Zhang Zhao used the opportunity to ask for a review of the laws. He presented the findings he collected over a period of time, and pointed out that the laws were too strict and the penalties for crimes were too harsh. Sun Quan did not respond to Zhang Zhao and instead turned to Gu Yong and asked him: "Sir, what do you think?" Gu Yong replied: "My observations coincide with what Zhang Zhao just described." Sun Quan thus approved Zhang Zhao's request for a review of the laws.

Sun Quan often sent his palace secretaries to consult Gu Yong on policy matters. If Gu Yong approved, he had food and drinks prepared for the secretaries while they discussed and refined their ideas with him. If he disapproved, he appeared solemn and remained silent, and had no food and drinks prepared for them. The secretaries then scrapped their ideas and went back. Sun Quan once said: "If Lord Gu is happy, that means he approves your idea. If he doesn't say anything, that means he thinks your idea can be improved. When that happens, I will think through again carefully." This quote showed that Sun Quan had much faith and respect for Gu Yong.

=== Response to suggestions to launch border raids ===
Around the time, many Wu military officers in charge of defending the border along the southern banks of the Yangtze River wanted to gain credit for making contributions in battle, so they often wrote to the imperial court to suggest launching small raids on Wu's rival state Wei in the north.

When Sun Quan sought Gu Yong's opinion on this, the latter said: "I heard that in warfare, one should refrain from trying to make petty gains. When these officers make such suggestions, they actually just want to claim some credit and glory for themselves, rather than for the greater benefit of our State. Your Majesty should ban them from making such suggestions. If a suggestion doesn't do much harm to the enemy and isn't sufficient for us to showcase our military prowess, then it shouldn't be taken into consideration." Sun Quan heeded his advice.

Throughout his tenure as Imperial Chancellor, Gu Yong never shared his opinions on policy issues except when he spoke to Sun Quan in person.

=== Lü Yi scandal ===
Around the 230s, Sun Quan appointed Lü Yi, whom he highly trusted, as the supervisor of the bureau in charge of auditing and reviewing the work of all officials in both the central and regional governments. Along with his colleague Qin Bo (秦博), Lü Yi freely abused his powers by picking on trivialities and falsely accusing numerous officials of committing serious offences. As a result, some officials were wrongfully arrested, imprisoned and tortured during interrogation.

Gu Yong was one of Lü Yi's targets. The latter initially prepared to make a case against him for incompetence and ask Sun Quan to remove him from office. However, after an official Xie Gong (謝厷) pointed out that Pan Jun, the Minister of Ceremonies, would most likely become the next Imperial Chancellor if Gu Yong were to be removed from office, Lü Yi immediately dropped the case against Gu Yong because he knew that Pan Jun resented him and would take action against him if he became Imperial Chancellor.

Lü Yi's abuses of power finally came to an end in 238 when Sun Quan learnt the truth about him and understood the gravity of the situation. After removing Lü Yi from office, Sun Quan had him imprisoned under the watch of the Ministry of Justice, and then ordered Gu Yong to conduct an investigation. While interrogating Lü Yi, Gu Yong maintained his composure and performed his job professionally. Before Lü Yi was escorted out, Gu Yong asked him, "Do you have anything else to say?" Lü Yi kowtowed and remained silent. When another official Huai Xu (懷叙) started scolding Lü Yi, Gu Yong sternly rebuked Huai Xu: "As government officials, we should follow the laws. Why must you do this?"

The Eastern Jin dynasty historian Xu Zhong (徐衆) disapproved of Gu Yong's handling of Lü Yi's case. He pointed out that Lü Yi's actions had severely damaged the integrity of the Eastern Wu government and reduced people's trust in the government. Xu Zhong argued that Gu Yong should not even provide Lü Yi an opportunity to defend himself, because if Lü Yi pleaded not guilty and Gu Yong submitted his plea to Sun Quan, there was a risk that Sun Quan might believe that Lü Yi was innocent and therefore release him. If that happened, then, in Xu Zhong's opinion, the efforts of Sun Deng, Pan Jun, Lu Xun and the others who stood up to Lü Yi's abuses of power would have been in vain. Xu Zhong also argued that Gu Yong should not reprimand Huai Xu for scolding Lü Yi because Lü Yi deserved it for his evil deeds.

== Lecturing his grandson on proper behaviour ==
On one occasion, one of Sun Quan's nieces married a younger maternal relative of Gu Yong. Gu Yong, along with his sons and grandson Gu Tan, attended the wedding. At the time, Gu Tan held an important position as Master of Writing in the Selection Bureau (選曹尚書; the equivalent of a present-day human resources director) of the government. During the celebrations, he became drunk and started dancing wildly in an unrestrained manner in front of his grandfather, Sun Quan and the other guests. Gu Yong felt extremely embarrassed and upset with his grandson's behaviour but he did not say anything.

The following day, Gu Yong summoned Gu Tan and lectured him: "Rulers see it as a virtue to endure hardship for the sake of fulfilling a greater purpose; subjects see it as their duty to be mindful, humble and respectful. In the past, although Xiao He and Wu Han made great contributions to the Han dynasty, the former became tongue-tied in front of Emperor Gao while the latter exercised caution when he spoke in front of Emperor Guangwu. What great contributions have you made to our State? You are in the Emperor's favour only because of your family background. How dare you lose control of yourself! Even though you weren't sober, your behaviour still shows that you aren't humble enough, and that you think you don't need to be respectful just because the Emperor favours you. It looks like one day you will be the one who brings disgrace to our family."

Gu Yong then faced away as he lay on his couch and rested. Gu Tan stood there for about two hours before his grandfather allowed him to leave.

== Death ==
After holding office as Imperial Chancellor for about 19 years, Gu Yong became critically ill towards the end of 243. When Sun Quan learnt about Gu Yong's condition, he sent his palace physician Zhao Quan (趙泉) to visit Gu Yong. He also commissioned Gu Yong's youngest son, Gu Ji (顧濟), as a Cavalry Commandant (騎都尉). When Gu Yong heard about it, he sadly remarked: "(Zhao) Quan is an expert at assessing whether someone will live or die. I know for sure that I won't recover. That is why the Emperor wants me to see (Gu) Ji receiving his commission." He died sometime between 29 November and 28 December that year at the age of 76 (by East Asian age reckoning).

Sun Quan donned mourning garments and personally attended Gu Yong's funeral. He also honoured Gu Yong with the posthumous title "Marquis Su" (肅侯), which means "serious marquis".

== Appraisal ==
Gu Yong was known for his abstinence from alcohol and for being a reserved and quiet person. He also maintained proper conduct and behaviour all the time, even in casual and informal settings. Sun Quan once said: "Although Gu Yong doesn't talk much, he is spot on when he speaks." Whenever Gu Yong attended festive celebrations, he was usually a spoilsport because his mere presence often made his colleagues feel uneasy. They were worried that he would see them in their non-sober states, so they tended to exercise greater self-control while enjoying themselves. Sun Quan even once remarked: "When Gu Yong is around, no one will have fun."

Chen Shou, who wrote Gu Yong's biography in the Sanguozhi, appraised Gu Yong as follows: "Gu Yong relied on his personal integrity and showed great wisdom and tolerance. That was why he was able to remain in a most prestigious position until his death."

== Family ==
=== Wife ===
Gu Yong married a daughter of Lu Kang, an official who served as the Administrator of Lujiang Commandery (廬江; around present-day Lu'an, Anhui) in the late Eastern Han dynasty. Through his marriage, he was a brother-in-law of Lu Ji, one of the 24 Filial Exemplars who served as an official under Sun Quan. (Note: The Sanguozhi recorded that Gu Shao, Gu Yong's eldest son, was equally famous as his maternal uncle Lu Ji in his youth. If Lu Ji was a maternal uncle of Gu Shao, that means Gu Yong married Lu Ji's sister and hence Gu Yong's father-in-law was Lu Ji's father, Lu Kang.)

=== Children and descendants ===
Gu Yong had three sons: Gu Shao (顧邵), Gu Yu (顧裕) and Gu Ji (顧濟).

Gu Shao died around the age of 30 while holding office as the Administrator of Yuzhang Commandery (豫章郡; around present-day Nanchang, Jiangxi). He married a niece of Sun Quan, and had two sons, Gu Tan (顧譚) and Gu Cheng (顧承), who served as officials under Sun Quan but were eventually exiled to the remote Jiao Province.

Gu Yong's second son, Gu Yu, was also known as Gu Mu (顧穆). He served as the Administrator of Yidu Commandery (宜都郡; around present-day Yidu, Hubei) and was known for being in poor health. One of his sons, Gu Rong (顧榮), came to serve under the Jin dynasty after the fall of Eastern Wu and rose to high positions in the Jin government. One of Gu Rong's nephews, Gu Yu (顧禺), was already well known in his youth. He served as a Regular Mounted Attendant (散騎侍郎) under the Jin dynasty but died early.

Gu Yong's third and youngest son, Gu Ji, inherited his father's peerage as the Marquis of Liling (醴陵侯) because his eldest brother died early and his second brother was not in a good state of health to succeed their father. Gu Ji did not have any children so when he died, there was no one to inherit his peerage. During the Yong'an era (258–264), the third Eastern Wu emperor Sun Xiu issued an imperial edict as follows: "The late Imperial Chancellor (Gu) Yong was virtuous and loyal. He played a supportive role to the State with his graciousness. I am deeply saddened to hear that he has no descendant to succeed him. I hereby order (Gu) Yong's second son, (Gu) Yu, to inherit the peerage of the Marquis of Liling, so as to honour (Gu Yong) for his past contributions."

=== Other relatives ===
Other notable relatives of Gu Yong include his brother Gu Hui (顧徽) and relative Gu Ti (顧悌), who also served as officials in Eastern Wu.

== See also ==
- Lists of people of the Three Kingdoms
