= Crucea, Constanța =

Crucea
- Commune
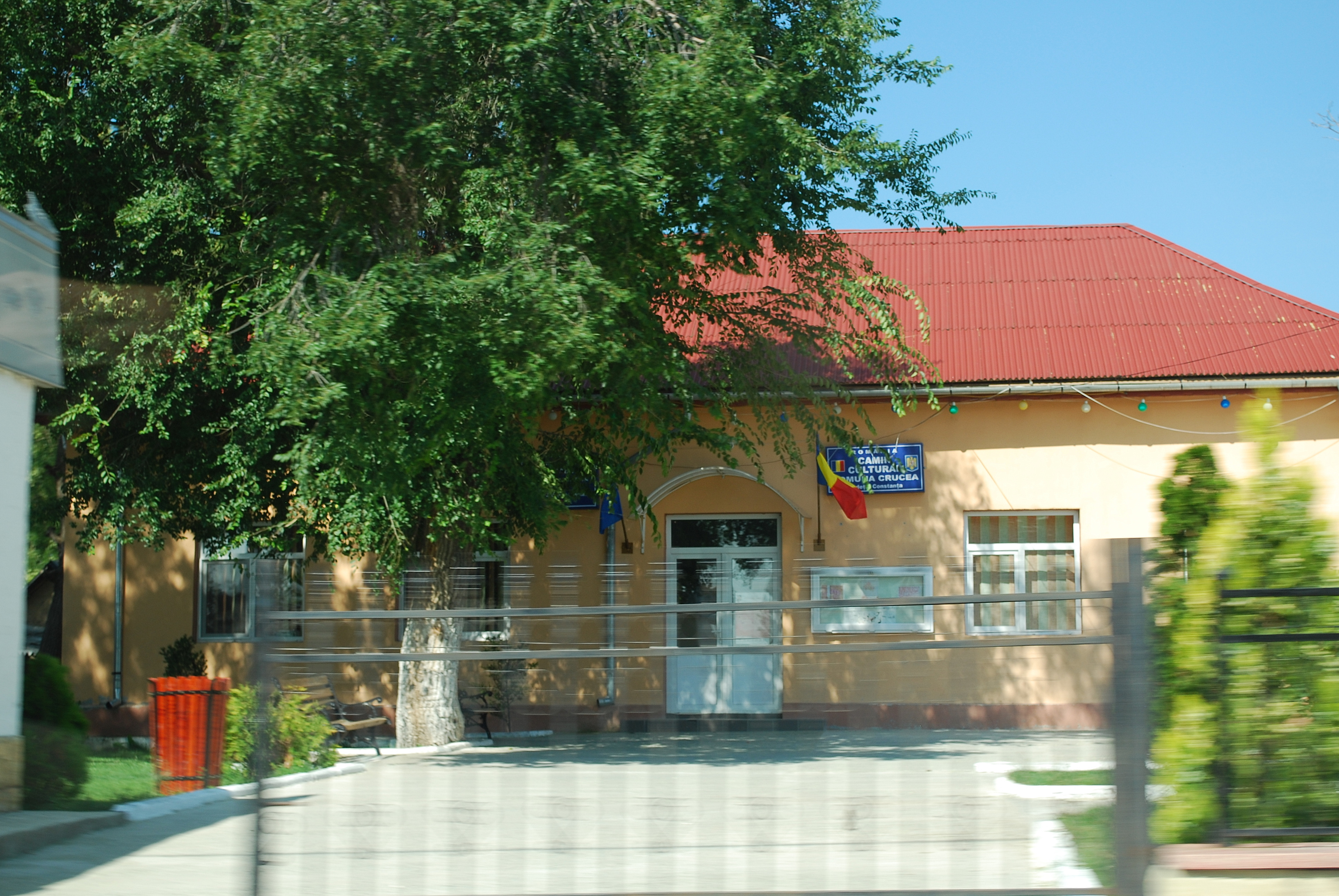
- Crucea cultural center

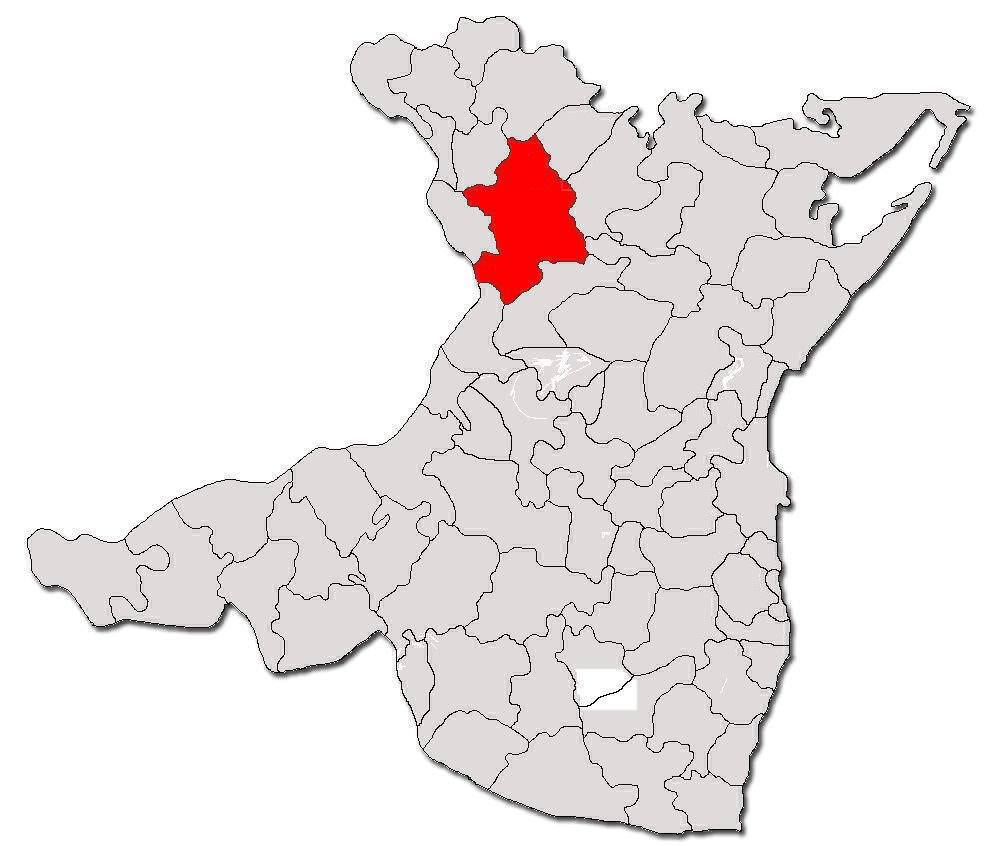
- Location in Constanța County

- Location in Romania
- Coordinates: 44°32′N 28°14′E
- Country: Romania
- County: Constanța
- Subdivisions: Crucea, Băltăgești, Crișan, Gălbiori, Șiriu, Stupina

Government
  - Mayor (2020–2024): Iulian Tudorache (PNL)
- Area: 238.16 km^{2} (91.95 sq mi)
- Elevation: 70 m (230 ft)
- Population (2021-12-01): 3,010
  - Density: 12.6/km^{2} (32.7/sq mi)
- Time zone: UTC+02:00 (EET)
  - Summer (DST): UTC+03:00 (EEST)
- Postal code: 907095
- Area code: +(40) x41
- Vehicle reg.: CT
- Website: primaria-crucea.ro

Crucea (Romanian pronunciation: [ˈkrut͡ʃe̯a]) is a commune in Constanța County, Northern Dobruja, Romania.

The commune includes six villages:

- Crucea (historical name: Satișchioi, Turkish: Satışköy)
- Băltăgești
- Crișan (historical name: Capugi, Turkish: Kapıcı); named after Marcu Giurgiu, also known as Crișan, one of the leaders of the 1784–1785 peasant revolt in Transylvania
- Gălbiori (historical name: Sarâgea, Turkish: Sarıca)
- Șiriu (historical name: Sublocotenent Măndoiu)
- Stupina (historical name: Ercheșec, Turkish: Erkeşek)

== Demographics ==
Historical population
Year	Pop.	±%
2002	3,439	—
2011	2,945	−14.4%
2021	3,010	+2.2%
Source: Census data

At the 2011 census, Crucea had 2,945 inhabitants, of which 2,768 (99.39%) were Romanians, 7 (0.25%) Turks, 5 (0.18%) Roma, and 5 (0.18%) others. At the 2021 census, the commune had a population of 3,010; of those, 90.17% were Romanians and 0.37% Roma.
