= Seimeni, Constanța =

Seimeni
- Commune
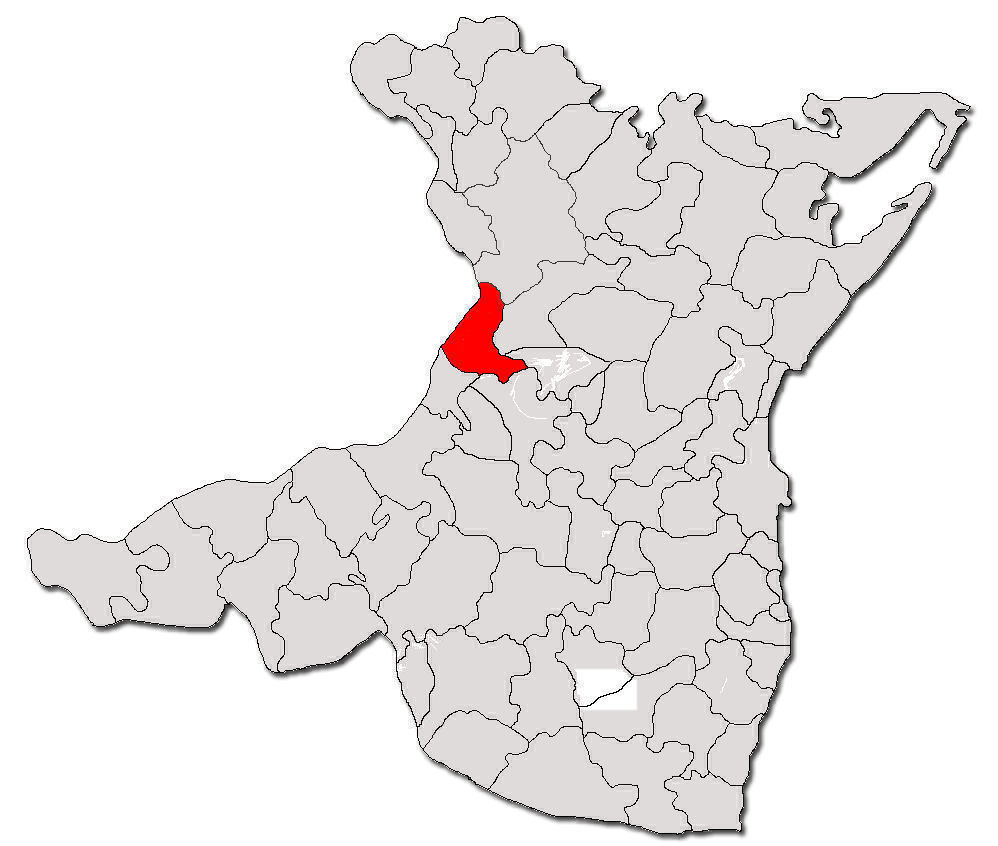
- Location in Constanța County

- Location in Romania
- Coordinates: 44°23′N 28°4′E
- Country: Romania
- County: Constanța
- Subdivisions: Seimeni, Dunărea, Seimenii Mici

Government
  - Mayor (2020–2024): Mitică Șerban (PSD)
- Area: 89.32 km^{2} (34.49 sq mi)
- Population (2021-12-01): 1,872
  - Density: 20.96/km^{2} (54.28/sq mi)
- Time zone: UTC+02:00 (EET)
  - Summer (DST): UTC+03:00 (EEST)
- Vehicle reg.: CT
- Website: www.primaria-seimeni.ro

Seimeni (Romanian pronunciation: [sejˈmenʲ]) is a commune in Constanța County, Northern Dobruja, Romania.

The commune includes three villages:

- Seimeni (historical name: Seimenii Mari, Turkish: Seymenköy)
- Dunărea (historical names: Boasgic, Turkish: Boğazcık)
- Seimenii Mici (Turkish: Küçük Seymenköy)

== Demographics ==
At the 2011 census, Seimeni had 1,955 Romanians (99.80%), 4 others (0.20%).

== Economy ==
Siemeni’s economic activity is modestly developed. It includes three small bread factories with limited production capacity, two fish farms (Domnească and Tibrinu), and two facilities focused on processing agricultural products and facilitating industrial production.

Recognizing the area’s tourism potential, the Seimeni Local Council has allocated a 4-hectare area, divided into 500 sq. m lots, for the development of a recreational base along the banks of the Danube River.

The population is mainly engaged in agriculture. The commune manages 8,000 hectares of arable land, 73 hectares of vineyards, and 1,600 hectares of pastures. The main crops grown are corn, wheat, oats, barley, and sunflower, while smaller areas can be used for coriander and potatoes. After the 1989 Romanian Revolution, the large agricultural holdings were dismantled, and residents began cultivating the land either individually or through the agricultural associations.

== Politics and administration ==
Seimeni is administered by a mayor and a local council composed of 11 councillors. The mayor, Mitică Șerban, from the Social Democratic Party, has been in office since 2016.

== Notable people ==
- Eugen Munteanu (born 1953), Romanian linguist
