= List of people of the Three Kingdoms (Y) =

The following is a partial list of people significant to the Three Kingdoms period (220–280) of Chinese history. Their romanised names start with the letter Y.

== Y ==
Name	Courtesy name	Birth year	Death year	Ancestral home (present-day location)	Role	Allegiance	Previous allegiance(s)	Notes
Lady Yan 嚴氏						Lü Bu		
Yan Baihu 嚴白虎				Wucheng County, Wu (near Suzhou, Jiangsu)	Warlord	Yan Baihu		
Yan Bao 嚴苞	Wentong 文通			Fengyi (Dali County, Shaanxi)	Politician	Cao Wei		
Yan Cai 嚴才					General	Han dynasty		
Yan Fu 閻浮					General	Cao Wei		
Yan Gan 嚴幹	Gongzhong 公仲			Fengyi (Dali County, Shaanxi)	Advisor, general, politician	Cao Wei		
Yan Gang 嚴綱			192		General	Gongsun Zan		
Yan Gang 嚴綱			239		Politician	Eastern Wu		
Yan Gu 延固				Nanyang (Nanyang, Henan)	Politician	Han dynasty		
Yan Gui 嚴圭					General	Eastern Wu		
Yan Jing 嚴敬					General	Yuan Shao		
Yan Jun 嚴畯	Mancai 曼才			Pengcheng (Xuzhou, Jiangsu)	Advisor, politician, scholar	Sun Quan		Sanguozhi vol. 53.
Yan Jun 嚴峻					Politician	Han dynasty		
Yan Kai 嚴凱				Pengcheng (Xuzhou, Jiangsu)	Politician	Eastern Wu		
Yan Kuang 嚴匡					General	Cao Cao		
Yan Fei 顏斐	Wenlin 文林			Jibei (Changqing, Shandong)	Politician	Cao Wei		
Yan Jun 顏俊				Wuwei (Wuwei, Gansu)	General	Han dynasty		
Yan Lian 顏連				Wuxi (Wuxi, Jiangsu)	Politician	Eastern Wu	Han dynasty	
Yan Liang 顏良			200		General	Yuan Shao		
Yan Mi 嚴密					Politician	Eastern Wu		
Yan Pu 閻圃		163	231	Anhan County, Baxi (Nanchong, Sichuan)	Advisor	Cao Wei	Zhang Lu	
Yan Rou 閻柔				Guangyang (Beijing)	Advisor	Cao Wei	Yuan Shao	
Yan Shuang 嚴爽				Pengcheng (Xuzhou, Jiangsu)	Politician	Eastern Wu		
Yan Wei 嚴維					Politician	Eastern Wu		
Yan Wen 閻溫	Bojian 伯儉		213	Xicheng, Tianshui (in Gansu)	General, politician	Cao Cao		Sanguozhi vol. 18.
Yan Wu 嚴武	Ziqing 子卿			Pengcheng (Xuzhou, Jiangsu)	Weiqi player			
Yan Xiang 嚴象	Wenze 文則	163	200	Jingzhao (Xi'an, Shaanxi)	General	Han dynasty		
Yan Xiang 閻象					Politician	Yuan Shu		
Yan Xin 嚴昕				Guangling County, Yandu (Yancheng, Jiangsu)				
Yan Xing 閻行	Yanming 彥明			Jincheng (around Lanzhou, Gansu and Xining, Qinghai)	General	Cao Cao	Han Sui	
Yan Yan 嚴顏	Xibo 希伯			Linjiang, Ba (Zhong County, Chongqing)	General	Liu Bei	Liu Zhang	
Yan Yan 閻晏					General	Shu Han		
Yan Yu 閻宇	Wenping 文平			Nan (Jingzhou, Hubei)	General	Shu Han		
Yan Yu 嚴輿			196	Wucheng County, Wu (near Suzhou, Jiangsu)		Yan Baihu		
Yan Zhi 閻芝					General	Shu Han		
Yan Zhi 閻志				Guangyang (Beijing)	Politician	Cao Wei		
Yan Zhong 閻忠				Hanyang, Liangzhou(Gangu County, Gansu)	General	Han dynasty		
Yan Zuan 閻纘	Xubo 續伯			Ba County, Anhan (Nanchong, Sichuan)	General, politician	Jin dynasty		Jin Shu vol. 48.
Lady Yang 楊氏			213		Ma Chao's wife	Ma Chao		
Yang Ang 楊昂		172	215		General	Zhang Lu		
Yang Bai 楊白		171	214		General	Zhang Lu		Sanguozhi vol. 36.
Yang Bao 楊豹				Hanyang (Tianshui, Gansu)		Cao Wei		
Yang Biao 楊彪	Wenxian 文先	142	225	Huayin, Hongnong (East of Huayin, Shaanxi)	Politician	Cao Cao	Han dynasty, Dong Zhuo, Li Jue	
Yang Bo 楊帛		171	214		General	Zhang Lu		Sanguozhi vol. 41.
Yang Bo 楊帛					Politician	Li Jue	Han dynasty	
Yang Can 楊粲					General	Eastern Wu		
Yang Chong 楊崇					General	Eastern Wu		
Yang Chou 楊醜			198		General	Zhang Yang		
Yang Ci 楊賜	Boxian 伯獻		185	Huayin, Hongnong (East of Huayin, Shaanxi)	Politician	Han dynasty		
Yang Dan 羊耽				Nancheng, Taishan (Fei County, Shandong)	General	Cao Wei		
Yang Dao 羊衜		201		Nanyang (Nanyang, Henan)	General	Eastern Wu		
Yang Dao 羊衜			232	Nancheng, Taishan (Fei County, Shandong)	Politician	Cao Wei		
Yang Di 楊迪				Yuzhang (Nanchang, Jiangxi)	Politician	Eastern Wu		
Yang Ding 楊定	Zhengxiu 正秀				General	Miscellaneous	Dong Zhuo, Li Jue, Han dynasty	
Yang Du 羊度					Politician	Eastern Wu		
Yang Feng 楊鳳					Bandit	Black Mountain bandits		
Yang Feng 楊奉		153	197		Bandit leader, general	Lü Bu	Yellow Turban rebels, Li Jue, Han dynasty, Yuan Shu	Houhanshu vol. 54; Sanguozhi vol. 6.
Yang Feng/Yang A'ruo 楊豐/楊阿若	Boyang 伯陽			Jiuquan (Jiuquan, Gansu)	Politician	Cao Wei	Han dynasty	
Yang Fu 楊阜	Yishan 義山			Ji County, Tianshui (Southeast of Gangu County, Gansu)	Advisor, politician	Cao Wei		Sanguozhi vol. 25.
Yang Gong 楊恭				Jianwei (Pengshan County, Sichuan)		Shu Han		
Yang Hong 楊洪	Jixiu 季休		228	Wuyang, Qianwei (Pengshan County, Sichuan)	Politician	Shu Han	Liu Zhang	Sanguozhi vol. 41.
Yang Hong 楊弘					Advisor	Yuan Shu		
Yang Hong 楊弘					Politician	Cao Wei		
Yang Hu 羊祜	Shuzi 叔子	221	278	Nancheng, Taishan (Fei County, Shandong)	General, politician	Jin dynasty	Cao Wei	Jin Shu vol. 34.
Yang Huai 楊懷			213		General	Liu Zhang		
Yang Hui 羊徽						Eastern Wu		
Yang Huiyu 羊徽瑜		214	278	Nancheng, Taishan (Fei County, Shandong)	Noble lady	Jin dynasty	Cao Wei	
Yang Ji 楊濟	Wentong 文通			Huayin, Hongnong (East of Huayin, Shaanxi)	General, politician	Jin dynasty		
Yang Ji 楊稷			271	Jianwei, Yizhou (Pengshan County, Sichuan)	General	Jin dynasty		
Yang Ji 楊暨	Xiuxian 休先			Xingyang (Xingyang, Henan)	General	Cao Wei		
Yang Jingshu 楊敬叔					Advisor	Eastern Wu		
Yang Jun 楊俊	Jicai 季才		222	Huojia, Henei (Xinxiang, Henan)	Politician	Cao Wei		Sanguozhi vol. 23.
Yang Jun 楊駿	Wenzhang 文長		291	Hongnong Huayin (Shaanxi province)		Jin dynasty		Jin Shu vol. 40.
Yang Kang 楊康					Politician	Cao Wei		
Yang Kui 陽逵				Xiping (Xining, Qinghai)	General	Cao Wei	Han Sui	
Yang Kui 楊逵				Qianwei County (Qianwei County, Sichuan)	Politician	Jin dynasty	Shu Han	Huayang Guo Zhi vol. 11. 11.
Yang Lan 楊覽	Gongzhi 公質			Huojia, Henei (Xinxiang, Henan)	Politician	Cao Wei		
Yang Li 楊利					Fangshi	Cao Wei		
Yang Lin 楊林					Politician	Yuan Shao		
Yang Lü 楊慮	Weifang 威方			Xiangyang, Nan County (Xiangyang, Hubei)				
Yang Mi 楊密		137	199		Politician	Guo Si	Han dynasty	
Yang Mi 羊祕				Pingyang, Dashan (Southeast of Xintai, Shandong)	Politician	Cao Wei		
Yang Min 楊敏					Politician	Shu Han		
Yang Mo 楊謨					General	Cao Wei		
Yang Mu 楊穆				Guangling County (Yangzhou, Jiangsu)	Advisor	Eastern Wu		
Yang Pei 楊沛	Kongqu 孔渠			Fengyi (Dali County, Shaanxi)	General, politician	Cao Wei		
Yang Peng 楊彭				Qianwei County (Qianwei County, Sichuan)	Politician	Jin dynasty	Shu Han	Huayang Guo Zhi vol. 11. 11.
Yang Pu 楊僕				Wudu (Cheng County, Gansu)	Tribal leader	Di		
Yang Qi 楊琦					Politician	Han dynasty		
Yang Qiu 楊秋					General	Cao Wei	Guanzhong coalition	
Yang Qun 陽群			228		General	Shu Han		
Yang Ren 楊任		170	215		General	Zhang Lu		
Yang Rong 楊融					Politician	Eastern Wu		
Yang Tai 楊汰	Jiru 季儒			Ba (Chongqing)		Shu Han		
Yang Tiao 楊條				Anding (Zhenyuan County, Gansu)	General	Cao Cao		
Yang Wan 楊玩					Politician	Shu Han		
Yang Wei 楊偉	Shiying 世英			Fengyi (Weinan, Dali County, Shaanxi)	Astronomer, advisor	Cao Wei		
Yang Xi 楊戲	Wenran 文然		261	Wuyang, Qianwei (Pengshan County, Sichuan)	Politician	Shu Han		Sanguozhi vol. 45.
Yang Xiao 楊囂				Huayin, Hongnong (East of Huayin, Shaanxi)	General	Jin dynasty		
Yang Xiaozu 楊孝祖						Han dynasty		
Yang Xin 楊欣			278		General	Jin dynasty	Cao Wei	
Yang Xiu 楊修	Dezu 德祖	175	219	Huayin, Hongnong (East of Huayin, Shaanxi)	Advisor, politician	Cao Cao		
Yang Xiu 羊琇	Yashu 雅舒			Nancheng, Taishan (Fei County, Shandong)	General	Jin dynasty		
Yang Xu 羊續	Xingzu 興祖	142	189	Pingyang, Dashan (Southeast of Xintai, Shandong)	Politician	Han dynasty		Houhanshu vol. 31.
Yang Xuan 楊宣					Politician	Han dynasty		
Yang Xun 楊訓				Julu (Pingxiang County, Hebei)	Politician	Cao Wei		
Yang Yan 楊艷	Qiongzhi 瓊芝	238	274	Hongnong, Huayin (Huayin, Shaanxi)	Empress	Jin dynasty		
Yang Yao 楊珧	Wenju 文琚		291	Hongnong, Huayin (Huayin, Shaanxi)	General	Jin dynasty		
Yang Yi 楊儀	Weigong 威公		235	Xiangyang (Xiangyang, Hubei)	General, politician	Shu Han		Sanguozhi vol. 40.
Yang Yi 陽儀					Politician	Han dynasty		
Yang Yi 楊猗				Huojia, Henei (Xinxiang, Henan)	Politician	Jin dynasty		
Yang Yong 楊顒	Zizhao 子昭			Jingzhou (Changde, Hunan)	Advisor, politician	Shu Han		
Yang Yuan 楊原					General	Han dynasty		
Yang Yue 楊岳				Hanyang (Tianshui, Gansu)	General	Han dynasty		
Yang Zhengxiu 楊整修					General	Han dynasty		Could possibly be Yang Ding
Yang Zhao 楊肇	Xiuchu 秀初			Xingyang (Xingyang, Henan)	General	Jin dynasty	Cao Wei	
Yang Zhu 楊竺				Guangling County (Yangzhou, Jiangsu)	Politician	Eastern Wu		
Yang Zong 楊宗					General	Eastern Wu	Shu Han	
Yang Zong 楊綜	Chubo 初伯				Politician	Cao Wei		
Yang Zuo 楊祚					General	Gongsun Yuan		
Yao Gong 姚貢					Politician	Han dynasty		
Yao Guang 姚光					Fangshi	Eastern Wu		
Yao Qiong 姚瓊				Tianshui (Gangu County, Gansu)	General	Cao Wei	Han dynasty	
Yao Tai 姚泰			223		Politician	Eastern Wu		
Yao Xin 姚信	Yuanzhi 元直			Wukang (Deqing, Zhejiang)	Politician	Eastern Wu		
Yao Zhou 姚伷	Zixu 子緒		242	Langzhong, Baxi (Langzhong, Sichuan)	Politician	Shu Han		
Yaokehui 姚柯回					Tribal leader	Qiang		
Yaolanni 藥蘭泥					Tribal leader	Tufa Shujineng		Song Shu vol. 33.
Yi Ji 伊籍	Jibo 機伯			Shanyang (Northwest of Jinxiang County, Shandong)	Advisor, politician	Shu Han	Liu Biao	Sanguozhi vol. 38. Referenced as Yin Ji on rare occasions.
Yi Liao 夷廖					General	Han dynasty		
Yi Xiu 乙脩					General	Cao Wei		
Yiduoza 壹多雜				Cheshi (Northwest of Turpan, Xinjiang)	Tribal leader	Gushi		
Yijianjiqie 伊健妓妾					Tribal leader	Lushuihu		
Yin Chun 殷純					Advisor	Shu Han		
Yin Damu 尹大目					General	Cao Wei		
Yin Deng 殷登				Wei County, Neihuang (Neihuang County, Henan)				
Yin Fan 隱蕃		209	230	Qingzhou (Linzi District, Zibo, Shandong)	General	Cao Wei		
Yin Feng 尹奉	Cizeng 次曾				General	Cao Wei		
Yin Guan 殷觀	Kongxiu 孔休				Advisor	Shu Han	Liu Biao	
Yin Hu 尹胡					Musician	Cao Wei		
Yin Hua 陰化					General	Shu Han		
Yin Ji 殷基				Fengyi, Yunyang (Chunhua County, Shaanxi)	Politician	Eastern Wu		
Yin Jia 尹嘉				Hanyang County (Tianshui, Gansu)	Politician	Han dynasty		
Yin Ju 殷巨	Yuanda 元大			Fengyi, Yunyang (Chunhua County, Shaanxi)	General	Jin dynasty	Eastern Wu	
Yin Kai 尹楷		161	204		General	Yuan Shang	Yuan Shao	
Yin Kui 陰夔					Politician	Yuan Shang	Han dynasty, Yuan Shao	
Yin Kui 殷馗				Liaodong (Chaoyang, Liaoning)	Astrologer			
Yin Li 尹禮				Xingyang (Northeast of Xingyang, Hebei)	General	Cao Wei	Zang Ba, Lü Bu	
Yin Li 殷禮	Desi 德嗣			Fengyi, Yunyang (Chunhua County, Shaanxi)	Diviner, politician	Eastern Wu		
Yin Lu 尹盧			222		General	Cao Wei		
Yin Mo 尹默	Siqian 思潛			Fu, Zitong (East of Mianyang, Sichuan)	Politician, scholar	Shu Han		Sanguozhi vol. 42.
Yin Mo 殷模					General	Eastern Wu		
Yin Pu 陰溥				He'nai County (Wuzhi County, Henan)	General	Liu Zhang		
Yin Qi 尹齊					Politician	Cao Wei		
Yin Shang 尹賞				Ji County, Tianshui (Southeast of Gangu County, Gansu)	Politician	Shu Han	Cao Wei	
Yin Shi 尹世					Politician	Cao Wei		
Yin Shu 殷署					General	Cao Wei		
Yin Xing 殷興					Rebel leader, general	Guo Ma	Eastern Wu	
Yin Xiu 陰脩					Politician	Han dynasty		
Yin Yi 尹異					General	Eastern Wu		
Yin You 殷祐	Qingyuan 慶元			Fengyi, Yunyang (Chunhua County, Shaanxi)	General	Eastern Wu		
Yin Zong 尹宗				Fu, Zitong (East of Mianyang, Sichuan)		Shu Han		
Ying Chun 應純				Runan, Nandun (Xiangcheng City, Henan)		Cao Wei		
Ying Lun 應倫					Politician	Cao Wei		
Ying Qu 應璩	Xiulian 休璉	190	252	Runan, Nandun (Xiangcheng City, Henan)	Scholar, politician	Cao Wei		
Ying Rong 潁容	Ziyan 子嚴			Chen'guo, Changping County (Xihua County, Henan)	Scholar			Houhanshu vol. 79. (Part.2)
Ying Shao 應劭	Zhongyuan 仲遠	150	203	Runan (Runan County, Henan)	Politician, writer, historian	Yuan Shao	Han dynasty	Houhanshu vol. 48.
Ying Xiu 應秀				Runan, Nandun (Xiangcheng City, Henan)		Cao Wei		
Ying Xun 應珣	Jiyu 季瑜			Runan (Runan County, Henan)	Politician	Han dynasty		
Ying Yang 應瑒	Delian 德璉		217	Runan (Runan County, Henan)	Advisor, politician, scholar	Cao Cao		
Ying Yu 應余	Zizheng 子正		218		Politician	Cao Cao	Han dynasty	
Ying Zhen 應貞	Jifu 吉甫		269	Runan, Nandun (Xiangcheng City, Henan)	Advisor, politician	Jin dynasty	Cao Wei	
Yiyimo 伊夷模/高延優			227	Xuantu County, Gaojuli (Tonghua, Jilin)	Tribal leader	Goguryeo		
Yong Kai 雍闓			225		General	Shu Han		
Yong Mao 雍茂					Advisor, politician	Shu Han		
You Chu 游楚	Zhongyun 仲允			Fengyi (Gaoling County, Shaanxi)	General	Cao Wei		
You Ju 優居					Tribal leader			
You Mu 酉牧				Chenliu (Kaifeng, Henan)	Politician	Cao Wei		
You Tu 尤突			216	Poyang, Yuzhang (Poyang County, Jiangxi)	Rebel leader	Cao Cao	Shanyue	
You Yi 游奕					General	Cao Wei		
You Yin 游殷	Youqi 幼齊			Fengyi (Gaoling County, Shaanxi)	Politician	Han dynasty		
Lady Yu 虞				Henei (Jiaozuo, Henan)	Noble lady, Wife of Cao Rui	Cao Wei		
Yu Bao 虞褒				Kuaiji (Shaoxing, Zhejiang)		Eastern Wu		
Yu Bing 虞昺	Shiwen 世文			Yuyao, Kuaiji (Yuyao, Zhejiang)	Politician	Eastern Wu		
Yu Cha 虞察				Yuyao, Kuaiji (Yuyao, Zhejiang)	General	Eastern Wu		
Yu Chun 庾純	Moufu 謀甫			Yanling (Yanling, Henan)	Politician	Jin dynasty		Jin Shu vol. 50.
Yu Chuo 于綽					Politician	Cao Wei		
Yu Digen 于羝根					Bandit leader	Black Mountain bandits		
Yu Du 于毒					Bandit leader	Black Mountain bandits		
Yu Dun 庾遁	Dexian 德先			Yanling, Yingchuan (Yanling County, Henan)	Politician	Cao Wei		
Yu Fan 虞翻	Zhongxiang 仲翔	164	233	Yuyao, Kuaiji (Yuyao, Zhejiang)	Advisor, fangshi, politician, scholar	Eastern Wu	Wang Lang	Sanguozhi vol. 57.
Yu Gui 于圭				Juping, Taishan (Tai'an, Shandong)	Politician	Cao Wei		
Yu Huan 魚豢				Jingzhao (in Shaanxi)	Scholar, writer	Cao Wei		
Yu Jin 于禁	Wenze 文則		221	Juping, Taishan (Tai'an, Shandong)	General	Cao Wei	Bao Xin	Sanguozhi vol. 17.
Yu Jun 庾峻	Shanfu 山甫		273	Yanling (Yanling, Henan)	Scholar, politician	Jin dynasty	Cao Wei	Jin Shu vol. 50.
Yu Jun 虞濬	Xianhong 顯弘			Chenliu County (Kaifeng, Henan)	General	Jin dynasty		
Yu Jun 虞俊				Yuyao, Kuaiji (Yuyao, Zhejiang)		Eastern Wu		
Yu Mi 于糜					General	Liu Yao		
Yu Pu 虞溥	Yinyuan 允源				Politician	Jin dynasty		Jin Shu vol. 82.
Yu Qin 虞欽			245		Rebel leader		Eastern Wu	
Yu Quan 于詮			258		General	Eastern Wu		
Yu Shou 虞授			279		Politician	Eastern Wu		
Yu Shu 庾倏	Xuanmo 玄默			Yanling, Yingchuan (Yanling County, Henan)	Politician	Jin dynasty		
Yu Si 虞汜	Shihong 世洪	218		Yuyao, Kuaiji (Yuyao, Zhejiang)	General, politician	Eastern Wu		
Yu Song 虞松	Shumao 叔茂			Chenliu, Yanzhou (Kaifeng, Henan)	Politician	Cao Wei		
Yu Song 虞耸	Shilong 世龍			Yuyao, Kuaiji (Yuyao, Zhejiang)	Astronomer, politician	Jin dynasty	Eastern Wu	
Yu Tan 虞譚	Si'ao 思奥			Yuyao, Kuaiji (Yuyao, Zhejiang)	General	Jin dynasty		
Yu Wan 禺婉					Noble lady	Cao Wei		
Yu Weigao 虞偉高								
Yu Xiang 虞翔				Kuaiji, Zhang'an (Linhai, Zhejiang)	Politician	Eastern Wu		
Yu Xin 虞歆	Wenxiu 文繡		196	Kuaiji, Yuyao (Yuyao, Zhejiang)	Politician	Han dynasty		
Yu Yan 育延					Tribal leader	Xianbei		
Yu Yi 庾嶷	Shaoran 劭然			Yanling (Yanling, Henan)	Politician	Cao Wei		
Yu Yi 庾顗				Yanling, Yingchuan (Yanling County, Henan)	Politician	Jin dynasty		
Yu Yongxian 虞永賢					Politician	Cao Wei		
Yu Zan 俞贊					General	Jin dynasty	Eastern Wu	
Yu Zhong 虞忠	Shifang 世方		280	Yuyao, Kuaiji (Yuyao, Zhejiang)	General, politician	Eastern Wu		
Yu Zhujian 鬱築鞬			228		General	Xianbei		
Yu Zi 于兹					General	Ze Rong		
Yu Zi 虞咨					General	Eastern Wu		
Yuan Ao 袁奥	Gongrong 公榮			Chen, Fule (Taikang County, Henan)	Politician	Cao Wei		
Yuan Ba 袁霸	Gongke 公恪			Yangxia, Chen (Northeast of Taikang, Henan)	Politician	Cao Wei		
Yuan Can 袁粲	Yizu 儀祖			Chenguo, Fule (Taikang County, Henan)	Politician	Jin dynasty		
Yuan Chang 爰敞					Politician	Jin dynasty		
Yuan Cheng 緣城					Rebel leader	Yellow Turban rebels		
Yuan Chunqing 袁春卿				Ruyang, Runan (Shangshui County, Henan)	Politician	Yuan Shao		
Yuan Di 袁迪				Guangling County (Yangzhou, Jiangsu)				
Yuan Han 爰翰					Politician	Jin dynasty		
Yuan Hong 袁閎	Xiafu 夏甫			Ruyang, Runan (Shangshui County, Henan)				
Yuan Huai 袁淮					Advisor	Cao Wei		
Yuan Huan 袁渙	Yaoqing 曜卿			Yangxia, Chen (Northeast of Taikang, Henan)	Advisor, politician	Cao Cao	Liu Bei, Yuan Shu, Lü Bu	Sanguozhi vol. 11.
Yuan Hui 袁徽				Chenguo, Fule (Taikang County, Henan)				
Yuan Ji 袁基			190	Ruyang, Runan (Shangshui County, Henan)	Politician	Han dynasty		
Yuan Jin 爰津				Gushu (He County, Anhui)	Politician	Han dynasty		
Yuan Jing 爰𩇕					General	Cao Wei		
Yuan Kan 袁侃	Gongran 公然			Yangxia, Chen (Taikang, Henan)	General	Eastern Wu		
Yuan Li 袁禮					Politician	Eastern Wu		
Yuan Liang 袁亮				Chen, Fule (Taikang County, Henan)	Politician	Cao Wei		
Yuan Lin 袁綝					General	Shu Han		
Yuan Long 袁龍			215		Politician	Liu Bei	Sun Quan	
Yuan Mai 袁買				Ruyang, Runan (Shangshui County, Henan)		Yuan Shao		
Yuan Min 袁敏				Chen, Fule (Taikang County, Henan)	Politician	Han dynasty		
Yuan Pang 袁滂	Gongxi 公熙			Chen, Fule (Taikang County, Henan)	Politician	Han dynasty		
Yuan Pei 袁沛					Scholar			Xu Jing's friend
Yuan Qian 爰倩	Junyou 君幼				General, politician	Jin dynasty		
Yuan Shang 袁尚	Xianfu 顯甫		207	Ruyang, Runan (Shangshui County, Henan)	General, warlord	Yuan Shang	Yuan Shao	
Yuan Shao 袁紹	Benchu 本初		202	Ruyang, Runan (Shangshui County, Henan)	General, politician, warlord	Yuan Shao	Han dynasty	Houhanshu vol. 74; Sanguozhi vol. 6.
Yuan Shao 爰邵					General	Cao Wei		
Yuan Shu 袁術	Gonglu 公路		199	Ruyang, Runan (Shangshui County, Henan)	General, politician, emperor, warlord	Yuan Shu	Han dynasty	Houhanshu vol. 75; Sanguozhi vol. 6.
Yuan Si 袁嗣					Politician	Cao Wei	Yuan Shu	
Yuan Sui 袁綏				Guangling County (Yangzhou, Jiangsu)	Politician	Han dynasty		
Yuan Tan 袁譚	Xiansi 顯思		205	Ruyang, Runan (Shangshui County, Henan)	General, warlord	Yuan Tan	Yuan Shao	
Yuan Wei 袁隗	Ciyang 次陽		190	Ruyang, Runan (Shangshui County, Henan)	Politician	Han dynasty		
Yuan Xi 袁熙	Xianyi / Xianyong 顯奕 / 顯雍		207	Ruyang, Runan (Shangshui County, Henan)	General, politician	Yuan Shang	Yuan Shao	
Yuan Xin 袁信					Jester	Cao Wei		
Yuan Xiong 袁雄					General	Sun Ce		
Yuan Xu 袁敍				Ruyang, Runan (Shangshui County, Henan)	Politician	Yuan Shao		
Yuan Yao 袁耀				Ruyang, Runan (Shangshui County, Henan)		Sun Quan	Yuan Shu	
Yuan Ye 袁曄	Siguang 思光			Guangling County (Yangzhou, Jiangsu)	Scholar	Eastern Wu		
Yuan Yi 袁遺	Boye 伯業		192	Ruyang, Runan (Shangshui County, Henan)	Politician	Han dynasty		
Yuan Yi 袁毅					Politician	Cao Wei		
Yuan Yin 袁胤				Ruyang, Runan (Shangshui County, Henan)		Liu Xun	Yuan Shu	
Yuan Yu 苑御					Warlord	Eastern Wu	Yuan Yu	
Yuan Yu 袁宇	Xuanhou 宣厚			Yangxia, Chen (Northeast of Taikang, Henan)				
Yuan Yuanchang 袁元長						Han dynasty		Yuan Chunqing's father
Yuan Zhong 袁忠	Zhengfu 正甫			Pingyu, Runan (Pingyu County, Henan)		Han dynasty		
Yuan Zhun 袁準	Xiaoni 孝尼			Chen, Fule (Taikang County, Henan)	Politician	Jin dynasty	Cao Wei	
Yue Chen 樂綝			257	Wei, Yangping (Qingfeng County, Henan)	General	Cao Wei		Referenced as Yue Lin on rare occasions.
Yue Dun 樂敦			254		Politician	Cao Wei		
Yue Fang 樂方				Nanyang (Nanyang, Henan)	Politician	Cao Wei		
Yue Guang 樂廣	Yanfu 彦輔			Nanyang (Nanyang, Henan)	Politician	Jin dynasty		Jin Shu vol. 43.
Yue Hedang 樂何當					Merchant	Gongsun Zan		
Yue Jin 樂進	Wenqian 文謙		218	Wei, Yangping (Qingfeng County, Henan)	General	Cao Cao		Sanguozhi vol. 17.
Yue Jiu 樂就			197		General	Yuan Shu		
Yue Song 樂松					Advisor, politician	Han dynasty		
Yue Xiang 樂詳	Wenzai 文載			Hedong County (Xia County, Shanxi)	General, politician, scholar	Cao Wei		
Yue Yin 樂隱			189	Anpingguo, Guanjin (Wuyi County, Hebei)	Politician	Han dynasty		
Yue Zhao 樂肇				Wei, Yangping (Qingfeng County, Henan)	General	Cao Wei		
Yufuluo 於夫羅		150	196		Tribal leader	Xiongnu		
Yun Wu 雲午					Artist	Cao Wei		
Yuwen Mohuai 宇文莫槐			293		Tribal leader	Yuwen		
