= Yu Xi =

4th-century Chinese astronomer and writer

Yu Xi (虞喜; fl. 307–345 AD), courtesy name Zhongning (仲寧), was a Chinese astronomer, politician, and writer of the Jin dynasty (266–420 AD). He is best known for his discovery of the precession of the equinoxes, independently of the earlier ancient Greek astronomer Hipparchus. He also postulated that the Earth could be spherical in shape instead of being flat and square, long before the idea became widely accepted in Chinese science with the advances in circumnavigation by Europeans from the 16th-20th centuries, especially with their arrival into the capital's imperial court in the 17th century.

== Background and official career ==
The life and works of Yu Xi are described in his biography found in the Book of Jin, the official history of the Jin dynasty. He was born in Yuyao, Guiji (modern Shaoxing, Zhejiang province, China). Yu Song, son of Yu Fan, was recorded to be his clan elder. His father Yu Cha (虞察) was a military commander and his younger brother Yu Yu (虞預; fl. 307–329 AD) was likewise a scholar and writer; Yu's Jin Shu was regarded as one of the Eighteen History Books of Jin. During the reign of Emperor Min of Jin (r. 313–317 AD), Yu Xi obtained a low-level position in the administration of the governor of Guiji commandery. He declined a series of nominations and promotions thereafter, including a teaching position at the imperial university in 325 AD, an appointment at the imperial court in 333 AD, and the post of cavalier attendant-in-ordinary in 335 AD.

== Works ==
In 336 AD Yu Xi wrote the An Tian Lun (安天論; Discussion of Whether the Heavens Are At Rest or Disquisition on the Conformation of the Heavens). In it he described the precession of the equinoxes (i.e. axial precession). He observed that the position of the Sun during the winter solstice had drifted roughly one degree over the course of fifty years relative to the position of the stars. This was the same discovery made earlier by the ancient Greek astronomer Hipparchus (c. 190–120 BC), who found that the measurements for either the Sun's path around the ecliptic to the vernal equinox or the Sun's relative position to the stars were not equal in length.

Yu Xi wrote a critical analysis of the huntian (渾天) theory of the celestial sphere, arguing that the heavens surrounding the earth were infinite and motionless. He advanced the idea that the shape of the Earth was either square or round, but that it had to correspond to the shape of the heavens enveloping it. The huntian theory, as mentioned by Western Han dynasty astronomer Luoxia Hong (fl. 140–104 BC) and fully described by the Eastern Han dynasty polymath scientist and statesman Zhang Heng (78–139 AD), insisted that the heavens were spherical and that the Earth was like an egg yolk at its center. Yu Xi's ideas about the infinity of outer space seem to echo Zhang's ideas of endless space even beyond the celestial sphere. Although mainstream Chinese science before European influence in the 17th century surmised that the Earth was flat and square-shaped, some scholars, such as Song dynasty mathematician Li Ye (1192–1279 AD), proposed the idea that it was spherical like the heavens. The acceptance of a spherical Earth can be seen in the astronomical and geographical treatise Gezhicao (格致草) written in 1648 by Xiong Mingyu (熊明遇). It rejects the square-Earth theory and, with clear European influence, explains that ships are capable of circumnavigating the globe. However, it explained this using classical Chinese phrases, such as the Earth being as round as a crossbow bullet, a phrase Zhang Heng had previously used to describe the shape of both the Sun and Moon. Ultimately, though, it was the European Jesuits in China of the 17th century that dispelled the Chinese theory of a flat Earth, convincing the Chinese to adopt the spherical Earth theory established by the ancient Greeks Anaxagoras (c. 500–428 BC), Philolaus (c. 470–385), Aristotle (384–322 BC), and Eratosthenes (c. 276–195 BC).

Yu Xi is known to have written commentaries on the various Chinese classics. His commentaries and notes were mostly lost before the Tang dynasty, but the fragments preserved in other texts were collected in a single compendium by Qing-dynasty scholar Ma Guohan (1794–1857).

== See also ==
- History of science and technology in China
- Kunyu Wanguo Quantu, Chinese world map published in 1602 by the Jesuit Matteo Ricci and Ming-Chinese colleagues, based on European discoveries
- Shanhai Yudi Quantu, Chinese world map published in 1609
