= Lady Sun (disambiguation) =

Lady Sun (fl.180s - 211) was a Chinese noblewoman who lived during the late Eastern Han dynasty.

Lady Sun may also refer to:

- Lady Sun (Sun Jian's sister), Chinese noblewoman from the late Eastern Han dynasty to the early Three Kingdoms period
- Lady Sun (Yu clan) (240–334), Chinese noble woman of the Eastern Wu
