= Yu Si =

Eastern Wu general and official (c.218–c. 271)

- 虞汜

Inspector of Jiao Province (交州刺史)
- In office 270 – c.271
- Monarch: Sun Hao
- Succeeded by: Tao Huang

Champion General (冠軍將軍)
- In office ?–?
- Monarch: Sun Hao

Personal details
- Born: 218 (Note: The Kuaiji Dianlu recorded that Yu Si was 16 years old (by East Asian age reckoning) when his father Yu Fan died in c.233. By calculation, Yu Si's year of birth should be c.218.) Guangzhou, Guangdong
- Died: Unknown, probably in or after May 271
- Parent: Yu Fan (father)
- Occupation: Military general, politician
- Courtesy name: Shihong (世洪)
- Peerage: Marquis of Yuyao (餘姚侯)

Yu Si (218 - c.May 271 (Note: While the Kuaiji Dianlu recorded that Yu Si was made Inspector of Jiao Province after the campaign against the Fuyan barbarians, Tao Huang's biography in Book of Jin recorded that Tao was made Inspector of Jiao Province after the Jiaozhi campaign. If both records are correct, then Yu Si must have died shortly after his appointment, and Tao Huang succeeded him as Inspector of Jiao Province. In addition, Emperor Wu's biography in Book of Jin indicated that Yu Si was still alive during the 4th month of the 7th year of the Tai'shi era as he was recorded to have engaged Dong Yuan (then the Jin Administrator of Jiuzhen) in battle during that month; the month corresponds to 27 Apr to 26 May 271 in the Julian calendar.)), courtesy name Shihong, was a Chinese military general and politician of the state of Eastern Wu during the Three Kingdoms period of China.

== Life ==
Yu Si was the fourth son of Yu Fan, an official who served under Sun Quan, the founding emperor of Eastern Wu, and under Sun Quan's predecessor, Sun Ce. His ancestral home was in Yuyao County (餘姚縣), Kuaiji Commandery, which is in present-day Yuyao, Zhejiang. However, he was born in Nanhai Commandery (南海郡; around present-day Guangzhou, Guangdong) in Jiao Province because his father was exiled there by Sun Quan for showing disrespect on several occasions. Yu Si was 15 years old when his father died. After Yu Fan's death, Sun Quan freed his family from exile and allowed them to return to Yuyao County and bring Yu's remains back there for burial.

In 258, the Wu regent Sun Chen deposed the emperor Sun Liang and replaced him with Sun Xiu, the Prince of Langya (琅邪王). Before Sun Xiu arrived at the palace for the coronation, Sun Chen wanted to enter the palace first and behaved in a manner as if he was going to usurp the throne. He then summoned the court officials for a meeting. All of them looked fearful except for Yu Si, who appeared calm and composed. Yu Si told Sun Chen: "My lord, you hold an important position in the state just like Yi Yin and the Duke of Zhou in the past. You also wield the authority to depose and enthrone emperors. You will be bringing peace to the spirits of the past rulers and bringing benefits to the people. Everyone is excited about this. It is as if Yi Yin and Huo Guang have returned from the dead. However, now, you wish to enter the palace before the Prince's arrival. This will cause instability and make everyone feel suspicious of you. This isn't the way for you to establish a good reputation as a loyal and filial subject." Sun Chen felt unhappy after hearing Yu Si's words, but he nonetheless honoured Sun Xiu as the new emperor.

After Sun Xiu ascended the throne, he appointed Yu Si, He Shao, Wang Fan and Xue Ying as Central Regular Mounted Attendants (散騎中常侍)). Later, during Sun Hao's reign, in December 269 or January 270, Yu Si was appointed as an Ambassador-Inspector of the Army (監軍使者) and was ordered to lead Wu forces to attack the Fuyan barbarians (扶嚴夷). For his success in the campaign, he was promoted to Champion General (冠軍將軍), appointed as the Inspector (刺史) of Jiao Province, and enfeoffed as the Marquis of Yuyao (餘姚侯). He died of illness in an unknown year, but it is likely that he died soon after his appointment as Inspector of Jiao Province.

== Family ==
Yu Si had ten brothers. Among them, the notable ones were his fifth brother Yu Zhong, sixth brother Yu Song, and eighth brother Yu Bing.

== See also ==
- Lists of people of the Three Kingdoms
