= Yu Zhong (Eastern Wu) =

Official in the state of Eastern Wu (died 280)

- 虞忠

Administrator of Yidu (宜都太守)
- In office ? – 280

Personal details
- Born: Unknown
- Died: Between January and April 280 (Note: Vol.80 of Zizhi Tongjian recorded that the Jin expedition was launched in the 11th month of the 5th year of the Xianning era of the reign of Emperor Wu of Jin; the month corresponds to 21 Dec 279 to 18 Jan 280 in the Julian calendar. Vol.81 of Tongjian recorded that Sun Hao surrendered on the renyin day of the 3rd month of the 1st year of the Taikang era, which corresponds to 1 May 280 in the Julian calendar. Thus, Yu Zhong likely died between Jan and Apr 280.)
- Spouse: Lady Sun (Sun Quan's grandniece)
- Children: Yu Tan
- Parent: Yu Fan (father)
- Occupation: Official
- Courtesy name: Shifang (世方)

Yu Zhong (died c. early 280), courtesy name Shifang, was an official in the state of Eastern Wu during the Three Kingdoms period of China.

== Life ==
Yu Zhong was the fifth son of Yu Fan, an official who served under Sun Quan, the founding emperor of Eastern Wu, and under Sun Quan's predecessor, Sun Ce. His ancestral home was in Yuyao County (餘姚縣), Kuaiji Commandery, which is in present-day Yuyao, Zhejiang. His wife was Lady Sun also known as Lady Ding, a distant relative of Sun Quan.

He was known for being trustworthy and reliable. He also recognised the potential in persons such as Lu Ji and Wei Qian (魏遷) when they were still relatively unknown, and was proven right later when they became famous. He was a friend of Wang Qi (王岐), who was also from Yuyao County. They consecutively served as the Administrator of Yidu Commandery (宜都郡; around present-day Yichang, Hubei).

In early 280, when forces of the Jin dynasty invaded Wu, Yu Zhong joined the brothers Lu Yan and Lu Jing in defending Wu. They were all killed in battle, after which Wu was conquered by Jin.

== Family and descendants ==
Yu Zhong had 10 brothers. Among them, the notable ones were his fourth brother Yu Si, sixth brother Yu Song, and eighth brother Yu Bing.

Yu Zhong married a grandniece of Sun Quan. They had a son, Yu Tan (虞潭; fl.280-336 (Note: Zhengao recorded that Yu Tan died at the age of 70 (by East Asian reckoning) in the 8th year of the Xiankang era (c.342). If Yu Tan was 79 (by East Asian reckoning) in 342, then his birth year should be c.264, making him a teenager when his father died during the Jin invasion of Wu.)), whose courtesy name was Si'ao (思奧). The historical text Jin Yang Qiu (晉陽秋; by Jin historian Sun Sheng) described Yu Tan as a virtuous and morally upright person who appeared weak on the outside, but was actually courageous and resilient on the inside. (Note: Yu Tan's biography in Jin Shu also recorded this observation.) Yu Tan served in the imperial court of the Jin dynasty and rose through the ranks to the position of General of the Guards (衞將軍). (Note: The annals of Emperor Cheng in Book of Jin recorded that Yu Tan was made General of the Guards on 16 Feb 336.) He was allowed to set up his own office and received the same honours as the Three Ducal Ministers. He died at the age of 79 (by East Asian reckoning) and was posthumously awarded the appointment Palace Attendant (侍中) and Left Household Counsellor (左光祿大夫); he was also given the posthumous name Xiaolie. Yu Tan had a son, Yu Ge (虞仡 (Note: The character "仡" has two pronunciations: "yì" and "gē")), who inherited his peerage of Marquis of Wuchang County (武昌县侯). (Note: Yu Tan had another son named Yu Chu (虞楚), who was mentioned in Lady Sun's biography in vol.96 of Jin Shu.) Yu Ge was the father of Yu Xiaofu (虞啸父).

Yu Zhong had another son, whose name was unrecorded but was older than Yu Tan. This unnamed son had a son named Yu Fei (虞𩦎). Yu Fei himself had a son, Yu Gu (虞谷).

== See also ==
- Lists of people of the Three Kingdoms
