= Yu Song =

Late 3rd century Chinese official and astronomer

- 虞聳

Chancellor of Hejian (河間相)
- In office after 280 – ?
- Monarch: Emperor Wu of Jin

Administrator of Hejian (河間太守)
- In office ?–?

Administrator of Xiangdong (湘東)
- In office ?–?

Minister of Justice (廷尉)
- In office ?–?

Colonel of Striding Cavalry (越騎校尉)
- In office ?–?

Personal details
- Born: Unknown
- Died: Unknown
- Parent: Yu Fan (father)
- Occupation: Official
- Courtesy name: Shilong (世龍)

Yu Song (fl.234 - 280), courtesy name Shilong, was an official of the Jin dynasty of China. He previously served in the state of Eastern Wu during the Three Kingdoms period. He wrote the Qiong Tian Lun (穹天論), an essay on astronomy.

== Life ==
Yu Song was the sixth son of Yu Fan, an official who served under Sun Quan, the founding emperor of Eastern Wu, and under Sun Quan's predecessor, Sun Ce. His ancestral home was in Yuyao County (餘姚縣), Kuaiji Commandery, which is in present-day Yuyao, Zhejiang. He was known for being honest, unpretentious and courteous. While he was in Wu, he assumed the following appointments: Colonel of Striding Cavalry (越騎校尉), Minister of Justice (廷尉), and Administrator (太守) of Xiangdong (湘東) and Hejian (河間) commanderies.

In 280, after Wu was conquered by the Jin dynasty, he went on to serve in the Jin government and was appointed as the Chancellor (相) of Hejian Principality (河間國). Sima Yong, the Prince of Hejian (河間王), had heard of Yu Song before and he treated him respectfully. Whenever he met and interviewed potential candidates to join the civil service, he did so in plain and simple buildings instead of in his office. Wang Qi (王岐), who was a friend of Yu Song's fifth brother Yu Zhong, tried to make things difficult for Yu Song by saying that elegant people possessed great talent. In response to Wang Qi's remark, Yu Song wrote to his nephew Yu Cha (虞察), "Those who recruit others to serve in the government had never ventured as far as into the countryside or society to search for talents. The ones who succeed are those they favour, while the ones who fail are those they do not favour. This is exactly what I always lament about."

Yu Song also strongly disapproved of lavish spending on funerals. When his eighth brother Yu Bing died, he offered only a lamb and some food and wine as sacrifices at his brother's funeral. His family and relatives followed this practice.

== Family ==
Yu Song had 10 brothers. Among them, the notable ones were his fourth brother Yu Si, fifth brother Yu Zhong, and eighth brother Yu Bing.

The Jin-era scholars Yu Xi and Yu Yu were his clan juniors.

== See also ==
- Lists of people of the Three Kingdoms
