= Yu Bing =

Late 3rd century Chinese Eastern Wu and Western Jin official

- 虞昺

Administrator of Jiyin (濟陰太守)
- In office after 280 – ?
- Monarch: Emperor Wu of Jin

Personal details
- Born: Unknown
- Died: Unknown
- Parent: Yu Fan (father)
- Occupation: Official
- Courtesy name: Shiwen (世文)

Yu Bing (fl.234 – 280), courtesy name Shiwen, was an official of the Western Jin dynasty of China. He previously served in the state of Eastern Wu during the Three Kingdoms period.

== Life ==
Yu Bing was the eighth son of Yu Fan, an official who served under Sun Quan, the founding emperor of Eastern Wu, and under Sun Quan's predecessor, Sun Ce. His ancestral home was in Yuyao County (餘姚縣), Kuaiji Commandery, which is in present-day Yuyao, Zhejiang. He held extraordinary ambitions when he was young. When he grew up, he served in Wu as a Gentleman of the Yellow Gate (黃門郎) and was promoted to a Master of Writing (尚書) and Palace Attendant later.

In 280, when forces of the Jin dynasty invaded Wu, the Wu imperial court granted authority to Yu Bing to supervise military affairs in Wuchang (武昌; present-day Ezhou, Hubei). However, Yu Bing returned his official seal and authority to the Wu court and then surrendered to Jin. He was appointed as the Administrator (太守) of Jiyin Commandery (濟陰郡; around present-day Dingtao County, Shandong) by the Jin government. He became famous for upholding justice and helping the poor while he held office.

== Family ==
Yu Bing had 10 brothers. Among them, the notable ones were his fourth brother Yu Si, fifth brother Yu Zhong, and sixth brother Yu Song.

== See also ==
- Lists of people of the Three Kingdoms
