= Lady Sun (Yu clan) =

Dowager Marchioness of Wuchang Lady Sun 孫氏

Personal details
- Born: c.240 CE
- Died: c.334 CE
- Spouse: Yu Zhong
- Relations: Sun Quan (grand uncle)
- Children: Yu Tan
- Posthumous name: Lady of Resolute (定夫人)

Military service
- Allegiance: Eastern Wu; Western Jin
- Battles/wars: Du Tao's rebellion Su Jun's rebellion

Lady Sun (孫氏, c.240 – c.334) was a Chinese noble woman of the Eastern Wu during the Three Kingdoms period (220–280 AD) and later the Jin dynasty (266–420 AD). She was a distant relative of Sun Quan and was married to Yu Zhong, the fifth son of Yu Fan, with whom she had a son named Yu Tan.

She lived in the state of Wu until its eventual subjugation by the Jin dynasty, and bore witness to the pivotal conclusion of the era of the Three Kingdoms. During the Jin era, she engaged in some military campaigns, providing financial support to bolster the army. Her contributions played an instrumental role in securing victories for her allies on the battlefield, a feat that would later earn her the title of "Dowager Marchioness of Wuchang" (武昌侯太夫人). Recognizing her exceptional service, court ministers of the time formally acknowledged her accomplishments, and she was recorded in "Biographies of Exemplary Women" in the Book of Jin.

== Life in Eastern Wu ==
Ladu Sun hailed from Fuchun County in Wu Commandery, Yangzhou. She also had familial ties to Sun Quan, the founder of Eastern Wu state. Lady Sun was known for her intelligence, quick wit, and profound knowledge. She was a woman of great culture and insight. She imparted the values of loyalty and righteousness to her son Yu Tan, which earned him high esteem.

In 280, when forces of the Jin dynasty invaded Wu, Yu Zhong joined the brothers Lu Yan and Lu Jing in defending Wu. They were all killed in battle, after which Wu was conquered by Jin. The conquest of Wu by the Jin dynasty marked the end of the Eastern Wu state and effectively concluded the era of the Three Kingdoms. After this event, Lady Sun, who was then about 40, (Note: Lady Sun's biography in Book of Jin did not record her age when she was widowed; it only recorded that she was "young" (少).) was presented with proposals for a new marriage. Despite the profound changes that occurred in her homeland, which was now part of the Jin dynasty, Lady Sun remained resolute in her decision, refusing offers of marriage.

== Life under Jin dynasty ==
During the late Western Jin period, Yu Tan was appointed as the Administrator of Nankang. (Note: Yu Tan's biography in Book of Jin recorded that he was made Administrator of Nankang after the defeat of Chen Min's brother Chen Hui c.April 307; Yu was also awarded the peerage of Marquis of Dongxiang.) When Du Tao in Xiangchuan staged a rebellion, Lady Sun dedicated her wealth to comfort and support the soldiers, which ultimately led to their victory.

Later, during Su Jun's rebellion, when Yu Tan was stationed in Wuxing, the imperial court dispatched him to suppress the rebellion. Lady Sun sent her subordinates and her grandson Yu Chu (Yu Tan's son) (Note: According to Lady Sun's biography in Book of Jin, when she heard that Wang Shu (王舒) from the Wang clan of Langya was sending his son Wang Yunzhi (王允之) to battle, she questioned Yu Tan, "Lord Wang has sent his son to battle; why have you not done the same?" Yu Tan then sent Yu Chu to join Wang Shu and Wang Yunzhi.) to accompany Yu Tan in the campaign. She even converted her personal jade ornaments into funds for the army. In recognition of her contributions, she was honored with the title "Dowager Marchioness of Wuchang" (武昌侯太夫人) (Note: According to Yu Tan's biography in Book of Jin, he was appointed Marquis of Wuchang County (武昌县侯), with a fief of 1600 households.) and was awarded the Golden Seal and Purple Ribbon. (Note: According to Yu Tan's biography in Book of Jin, after Su Jun's rebellion was quelled (in early 329), he resigned his positions and returned to Yuyao to take care of Lady Sun. At this point, Lady Sun was probably in her late 80s or early 90s.)

Lady Sun earned the respect of the court ministers, with even the Minister of Works, Wang Dao, and other officials visiting her residence to pay their respects to her.

In c.334, Lady Sun died at the age of 95 (by East Asian reckoning). Emperor Cheng of Jin dispatched envoys to attend her funeral, and she was posthumously honored with the title "Lady of Resolute" (定夫人).

== Sources ==
- Chen, Shou (3rd century). Records of the Three Kingdoms (Sanguozhi).
- Fang, Xuanling (ed.) (648). Book of Jin (Jin Shu).
- Pei, Songzhi (5th century). Annotated Records of the Three Kingdoms (Sanguozhi zhu).
