= Fei County =

Fei County 费县
- County
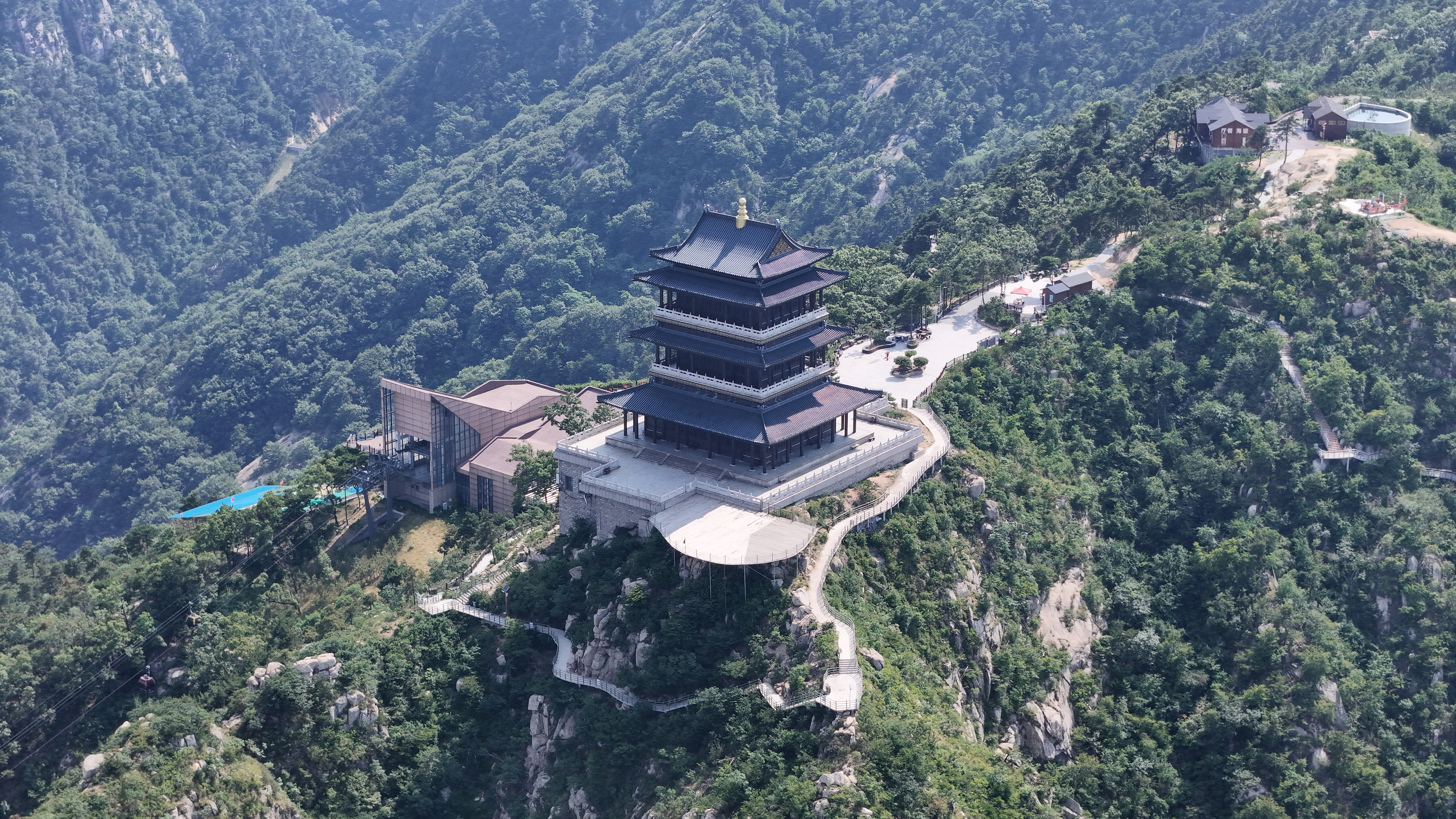
- Tianmeng scenic area

- Location of the seat in Shandong Feixian (China)
- Coordinates: 35.266°N 117.977°E
- Country: People's Republic of China
- Province: Shandong
- Prefecture-level city: Linyi

Area
  - Total: 1,660 km^{2} (640 sq mi)

Population (2019)
  - Total: 918,374
  - Density: 553/km^{2} (1,430/sq mi)
- Time zone: UTC+8 (China Standard)
- Postal code: 273400

Fei County
- Traditional Chinese: 費縣
- Simplified Chinese: 费县
Transcriptions
Standard Mandarin
- Hanyu Pinyin: Fèi Xiàn

Fei County or Feixian falls under the jurisdiction of Linyi, in the south of Shandong Province, China.

== Administrative divisions ==
As of 2012, this County is divided to 1 subdistrict, 9 towns and 2 townships.

Subdistricts

- Feicheng Subdistrict (费城街道)

Towns

- Shangye (上冶镇)
- Xuezhuang (薛庄镇)
- Tanyi (探沂镇)
- Zhutian (朱田镇)
- Liangqiu (梁邱镇)
- Xinzhuang (新庄镇)
- Mazhuang (马庄镇)
- Huyang (胡阳镇)
- Shijing (石井镇)

Townships

- Datianzhuang Township (大田庄乡)
- Nanzhangzhuang Township (南张庄乡)

== Climate ==
Climate data for Feixian, elevation 121 m (397 ft), (1991–2020 normals, extremes 1981–present)
| Month | Jan | Feb | Mar | Apr | May | Jun | Jul | Aug | Sep | Oct | Nov | Dec | Year |
|---|---|---|---|---|---|---|---|---|---|---|---|---|---|
| Record high °C (°F) | 17.6 (63.7) | 24.5 (76.1) | 32.1 (89.8) | 34.9 (94.8) | 38.7 (101.7) | 39.1 (102.4) | 42.5 (108.5) | 37.3 (99.1) | 37.2 (99.0) | 35.2 (95.4) | 27.6 (81.7) | 19.0 (66.2) | 42.5 (108.5) |
| Mean daily maximum °C (°F) | 5.0 (41.0) | 8.2 (46.8) | 14.3 (57.7) | 21.3 (70.3) | 26.7 (80.1) | 30.3 (86.5) | 31.3 (88.3) | 30.3 (86.5) | 26.8 (80.2) | 21.4 (70.5) | 13.7 (56.7) | 6.9 (44.4) | 19.7 (67.4) |
| Daily mean °C (°F) | −0.3 (31.5) | 2.8 (37.0) | 8.4 (47.1) | 15.3 (59.5) | 20.9 (69.6) | 24.8 (76.6) | 26.8 (80.2) | 25.9 (78.6) | 21.6 (70.9) | 15.5 (59.9) | 8.2 (46.8) | 1.6 (34.9) | 14.3 (57.7) |
| Mean daily minimum °C (°F) | −4.2 (24.4) | −1.6 (29.1) | 3.4 (38.1) | 9.8 (49.6) | 15.5 (59.9) | 20.0 (68.0) | 23.3 (73.9) | 22.5 (72.5) | 17.4 (63.3) | 10.8 (51.4) | 3.8 (38.8) | −2.3 (27.9) | 9.9 (49.7) |
| Record low °C (°F) | −16.6 (2.1) | −14.9 (5.2) | −10.3 (13.5) | −2.4 (27.7) | 3.8 (38.8) | 12.1 (53.8) | 16.4 (61.5) | 12.0 (53.6) | 6.9 (44.4) | −2.3 (27.9) | −9.6 (14.7) | −14.8 (5.4) | −16.6 (2.1) |
| Average precipitation mm (inches) | 12.6 (0.50) | 17.7 (0.70) | 21.2 (0.83) | 35.4 (1.39) | 66.6 (2.62) | 101.9 (4.01) | 215.7 (8.49) | 223.4 (8.80) | 60.9 (2.40) | 32.1 (1.26) | 30.7 (1.21) | 15.1 (0.59) | 833.3 (32.8) |
| Average precipitation days (≥ 0.1 mm) | 3.4 | 4.2 | 4.6 | 6.1 | 7.7 | 8.3 | 13.3 | 12.3 | 7.3 | 5.6 | 5.1 | 3.7 | 81.6 |
| Average snowy days | 3.5 | 3.2 | 1.1 | 0.2 | 0 | 0 | 0 | 0 | 0 | 0 | 0.8 | 1.9 | 10.7 |
| Average relative humidity (%) | 61 | 58 | 54 | 55 | 59 | 65 | 78 | 79 | 73 | 68 | 66 | 63 | 65 |
| Mean monthly sunshine hours | 157.6 | 154.4 | 200.4 | 219.5 | 235.9 | 199.3 | 173.9 | 175.6 | 180.4 | 184.9 | 160.9 | 159.8 | 2,202.6 |
| Percentage possible sunshine | 50 | 50 | 54 | 56 | 54 | 46 | 40 | 43 | 49 | 54 | 53 | 53 | 50 |
Source: China Meteorological Administration
