= Chunhua County =

Chunhua County 淳化县 Chunhwa
- County
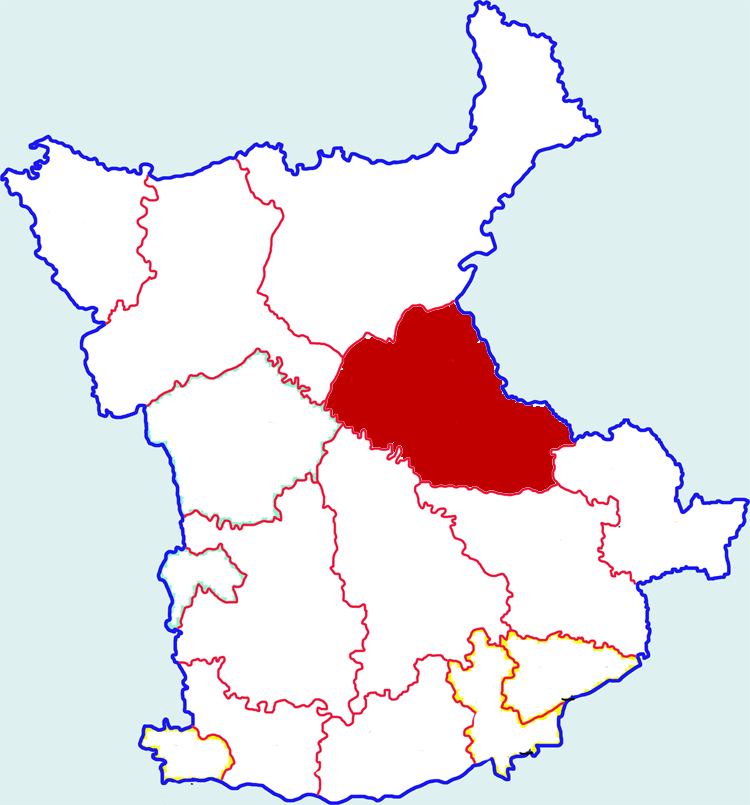
- Chunhua in Xianyang

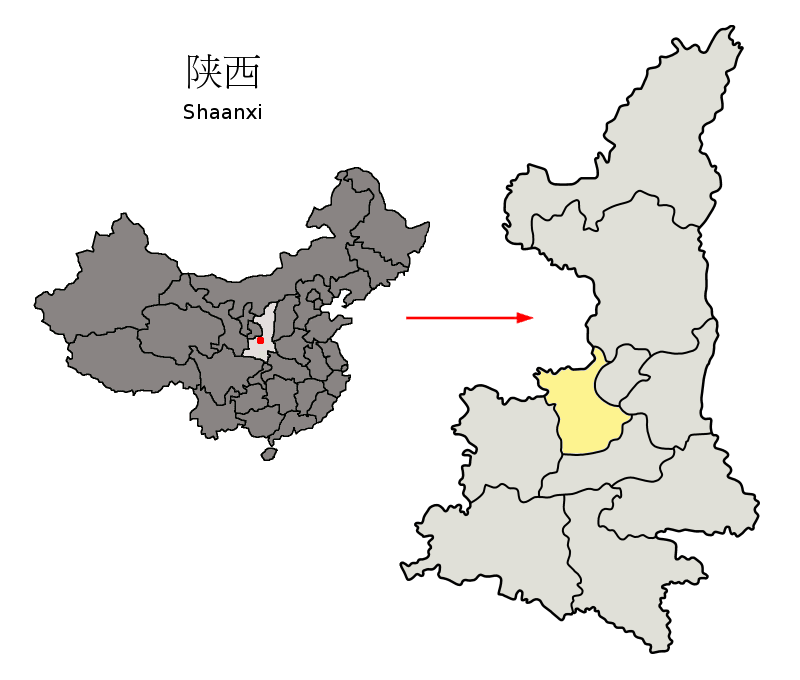
- Xianyang in Shaanxi
- Coordinates: 34.8°N 108.583°E
- Country: People's Republic of China
- Province: Shaanxi
- Prefecture-level city: Xianyang

Area
  - Total: 965 km^{2} (373 sq mi)

Population (2018)
  - Total: 197,800
  - Density: 205/km^{2} (531/sq mi)
- Time zone: UTC+8 (China standard time)
- Postal code: 711200
- Licence plates: 陕D

Chunhua County (Chinese: 淳化; pinyin: Chúnhuà) is a county under the administration of the prefecture-level city of Xianyang, in the central part of Shaanxi province, China.

== Administrative divisions ==
As of 2016, this County is divided to 12 towns.

Towns

- Chengguan (城关镇)
- Guanzhuang (官庄镇)
- Majia (马家镇)
- Fangli (方里镇)
- Runzhen (润镇)
- Chewu (车坞镇)
- Tiewang (铁王镇)
- Shiqiao (石桥镇)
- Hujiamiao (胡家庙镇)
- Shiliyuan (十里塬镇)
- Guxian (固贤镇)
- Bojia (卜家镇)

== Climate ==
Climate data for Chunhua, elevation 1,013 m (3,323 ft), (1991–2020 normals, extremes 1973–present)
Month	Jan	Feb	Mar	Apr	May	Jun	Jul	Aug	Sep	Oct	Nov	Dec	Year
Record high °C (°F)	16.8 (62.2)	22.2 (72.0)	26.8 (80.2)	33.8 (92.8)	34.6 (94.3)	36.4 (97.5)	39.4 (102.9)	39.4 (102.9)	36.4 (97.5)	28.7 (83.7)	22.8 (73.0)	17.9 (64.2)	39.4 (102.9)
Mean daily maximum °C (°F)	3.1 (37.6)	6.9 (44.4)	12.8 (55.0)	19.4 (66.9)	23.7 (74.7)	27.8 (82.0)	29.1 (84.4)	27.1 (80.8)	22.2 (72.0)	16.7 (62.1)	10.5 (50.9)	4.8 (40.6)	17.0 (62.6)
Daily mean °C (°F)	−2.9 (26.8)	0.7 (33.3)	6.3 (43.3)	12.5 (54.5)	17.0 (62.6)	21.4 (70.5)	23.4 (74.1)	21.7 (71.1)	16.8 (62.2)	10.8 (51.4)	4.4 (39.9)	−1.3 (29.7)	10.9 (51.6)
Mean daily minimum °C (°F)	−7.2 (19.0)	−3.6 (25.5)	1.5 (34.7)	6.8 (44.2)	11.2 (52.2)	15.7 (60.3)	18.6 (65.5)	17.5 (63.5)	12.9 (55.2)	6.7 (44.1)	0.1 (32.2)	−5.5 (22.1)	6.2 (43.2)
Record low °C (°F)	−17.7 (0.1)	−15.2 (4.6)	−10.6 (12.9)	−3.2 (26.2)	0.6 (33.1)	7.5 (45.5)	12.6 (54.7)	9.1 (48.4)	2.9 (37.2)	−6.3 (20.7)	−14.1 (6.6)	−21.0 (−5.8)	−21.0 (−5.8)
Average precipitation mm (inches)	7.3 (0.29)	9.3 (0.37)	21.3 (0.84)	36.2 (1.43)	53.6 (2.11)	73.1 (2.88)	89.7 (3.53)	108.9 (4.29)	98.2 (3.87)	51.9 (2.04)	19.8 (0.78)	4.6 (0.18)	573.9 (22.61)
Average precipitation days (≥ 0.1 mm)	4.6	4.8	6.3	7.1	9.7	10.0	11.3	11.6	11.6	10.2	5.8	3.2	96.2
Average snowy days	5.6	5.5	3.0	0.4	0	0	0	0	0	0.1	2.4	4.2	21.2
Average relative humidity (%)	59	60	59	60	63	65	75	80	81	77	69	60	67
Mean monthly sunshine hours	160.3	148.4	174.7	202.1	215.2	211.6	213.5	189.7	147.1	148.9	158.4	169.1	2,139
Percentage possible sunshine	51	48	47	51	50	49	49	46	40	43	52	56	49
Source: China Meteorological Administration all-time extreme temperature

== Transportation ==
- China National Highway 211
