= Ren Xi (Shu Han) =

3rd century Shu Han official and scholar

- 任熙

Administrator of Zhuti (朱提太守)
- In office ?–?
- Monarch: Sima Yan

Prefect of Zitong (梓潼令)
- In office ?–?
- Monarch: Liu Shan

Prefect of Nanzheng (南鄭令)
- In office ?–?
- Monarch: Liu Shan

Personal details
- Born: Unknown; Chengdu, Sichuan
- Died: Unknown (aged 68); Chengdu, Sichuan
- Relations: Ren Fang (ancestor)
- Children: Ren Fan
- Parent: Ren Yuan (father)
- Occupation: Official, scholar
- Courtesy name: Boyuan (伯遠)

Ren Xi (fl. third century), courtesy name Boyuan, was an official and scholar of the state of Shu Han in the Three Kingdoms period of China. After the fall of Shu in 263, he continued serving under the Jin dynasty, that succeeded Cao Wei state in 266.

== Life ==
Ren Xi was born in Chengdu, Shu Commandery (蜀郡), which is present-day Chengdu, Sichuan. He was a descendant of Ren Fang (任昉), the Minister of Finance (大司農) during the Han dynasty, and came from a family with a history of virtuous and talented individuals. His father was Ren Yuan (任元), whose courtesy name, was Xiuming (秀明), served as the Administrator of Qianwei (犍為太守) and Bearer of the Mace (執金吾) in the Shu Han government. Ren Xi was well versed in the Classic of Poetry, The Book of Changes and had a comprehensive understanding of the Four Books and Five Classics.

Ren Xi was devoted to his parents. During their mourning period, he was so grief-stricken that he became emaciated. Earning him the praise of his fellow townspeople. He was nominated as a xiaolian (civil service candidate). Ren Xi was appointed as the Prefect (令) of Nanzheng (南鄭) but resigned due to illness. Later, he was again offered the position of Prefect of Nanzheng but did not take up the post. Instead, he became the Prefect (令) of Zitong (梓潼) where he was known for his pure and honest governance.

He retired again due to bad health and returned home, where he focused on agriculture and maintained a modest lifestyle. Ren Xi was a model husband and father, known for his love and humility. He welcomed guests with open arms and was attentive to their needs, regardless of their social status. Ren Xi would often engage in stimulating conversations and was always mindful of his words.

During the Taikang (太康; 280–289 period), Ren Xi was offered the position Protector of the Army (護軍) of Yuexi but he declined as it did not align with his interests. He was then summoned to serve as a jishìzhong (給事中; "Serving within the Palace") in the central government but he refused again stating that he could not serve his own private interests while attending to his duties as a court official.

In the end, as he was sick, he vacated from his work. Whenever a new Prefect arrived in his home Commandery of Shu, they would pay their respects to Ren Xi. Annually, they would send him sheep and wine as gifts. Ren Xi was later appointed as the Administrator of Zhuti (朱提太守) but declined the position. He enjoyed writing, and his poems and essays were highly regarded. Ren Xi is thought to have died during the Yuankang (太康; 291–300 period) at the age of 69 (by East Asian age reckoning) at his home.

== Appraisal ==
Chang Qu, who wrote Ren Xi's biography in the Chronicles of Huayang (Huayang Guo Zhi), (Note: Ren Xi's biography is recorded in the eleventh volume of the Huayang Guo Zhi, titled Biographies of later worthies (後賢志), covering the life of notable persons from the Sichuan region who lived during the Jin dynasty.) appraised Ren Xi as follows: "Warm and respectful, who admired morality and disdained glory."

== Family ==
Ren Xi's son, Ren Fan (任蕃), whose courtesy name, was Xianzu (憲祖) was also nominated as a xiaolian by the government. He served as the Prefect of Xindu (新都令), a Major (司馬) of Western Barbarians (西夷), and the Administrator of Fuling (涪陵太守). Ren Fan's son, Ren Di (任迪), whose courtesy name, was Shugu (叔孤) was known for his academic achievements from a young age, surpassing his contemporary Gong Zhuang (龔壯) of Baxi. However, Ren Di passed away prematurely.

== Yang Peng and Yang Kui ==
Around the same time as Ren Xi born in Qianwei, Yang Peng (楊彭) and his younger brother Yang Kui (楊逵), were both known for their virtuous conduct and were also nominated as a xiaolian. Yang Peng served as the Prefect of Bisu (比蘇令) where a miraculous rain of sweet dew occurred during his tenure. Yang Kui served as the Prefect of Dianchi (滇池令) and his moral attitude was highly regarded even among the diverse customs of the region.

== See also ==
- Lists of people of the Three Kingdoms
