= Yu Fan =

Eastern Wu official and scholar (164–233)

- 虞翻

Cavalry Commandant (騎都尉)
- In office c.200 – c. 220s

Chief of Fuchun (富春長)
- In office ?–?

Officer of Merit (功曹)
- In office ?–?

Personal details
- Born: 164 (Note: Rafe de Crespigny states in A biographical dictionary of Later Han to the Three Kingdoms (23–220 AD) that Yu Fan died in 233. Yu Fan's biography in the Sanguozhi recorded that Yu Fan was 70 years old (by East Asian age reckoning) when he died. Hence, by calculation, Yu Fan was probably born in 164. However, the Zizhi Tongjian recorded that Yu Fan was already dead when Sun Quan wanted to recall him back from Jiao Province in the 9th or 10th month in the 6th year of the Tai'he era (227–233) in Cao Rui's reign.; the period corresponds to 2 Oct to 29 Nov 232 in the Julian calendar. This slightly contradicts the year of death given in de Crespigny's A biographical dictionary. This article uses the year of death provided in de Crespigny's A biographical dictionary.) (Note: There were two incidents in 232/233 involving Eastern Wu and Gongsun Yuan. The first incident took place in 232, where Sun Quan sent Zhou He (周贺) and Pei Qian (裴潜; not the same person as Pei Xiu's father) to buy horses from Gongsun Yuan. Yu Fan opposed this purchase and asked Lü Dai to pass on his advice to Sun Quan. Lü did not do so, and an angry Sun Quan further exiled Yu Fan to Mengling County. This account corresponds to the Wu Shu annotation cited by Pei Songzhi in Yu Fan's biography in Sanguozhi, as well as the account found in Sun Quan's biography of the same work. Tongjian then went on to record that Zhou He and co. were later ambushed and killed by Wei general Tian Yu. The second incident took place in 233, where Gongsun sent envoys to Sun Quan, proclaiming his willingness to submit to Wu. Sun Quan then sent Zhang Mi (张弥), Xu Yan (许晏) and He Da (son of He Qi) with troops and treasure to Liaodong. But, Gongsun later betrayed Wu, confiscated the troops and treasure and sent the Wu envoys' heads to Cao Rui. This account largely corresponds to the account found in Sun Quan's biography in Sanguozhi. In Tongjian, Sun Quan was reminded of Yu Fan's advice after the horse-purchasing fiasco, but before Gongsun Yuan's false submission and betrayal. Evidently, de Crespigny was of the opinion that Sun Quan remembered Yu Fan only after Gongsun's false submission and betrayal. Cao Rui's biography in Sanguozhi recorded that Gongsun Yuan killed the Wu envoys and sent their heads to Wei in the 12th month of the 1st year of the Qinglong era of Cao Rui's reign; Gongsun was also appointed da sima and Duke of Lelang. The month corresponds to 18 Jan to 15 Feb 234 in the Julian calendar.) Yuyao, Zhejiang
- Died: 233 (aged 69) Guangxi
- Children: Yu Si; Yu Zhong; Yu Song; Yu Bing; seven other sons
- Occupation: Essayist, politician, writer
- Courtesy name: Zhongxiang (仲翔)

Yu Fan (Chinese: 虞翻, Standard Mandarin: [y̌ fán], Middle Chinese: /ŋɨo pʰʉɐn/; 164–233), courtesy name Zhongxiang, was a Chinese essayist, politician, and writer of the state of Eastern Wu during the Three Kingdoms period of China. Initially a minor officer under Wang Lang, the Administrator of Kuaiji Commandery, Yu Fan later served under the warlord Sun Ce, who conquered the territories in the Jiangdong (or Wu) region in a series of campaigns from 194 to 199. Sun Ce regarded him highly and once enlisted his help in persuading Hua Xin, another commandery administrator, to surrender. After Sun Ce's death, Yu Fan continued serving under Sun Quan, Sun Ce's younger brother and successor, as a Cavalry Commandant. Sun Quan confined him for some time due to his rude and disrespectful behaviour, but released him in 219 and allowed him to accompany the general Lü Meng to attack Jing Province. During the Jing Province campaign, Yu Fan warned Lü Meng about a possible ambush when Lü Meng was celebrating a minor victory, and was proven right later.

Yu Fan was known for being very candid, outspoken and direct. As such, he offended Sun Quan several times – including instances when he was drunk – and did not get along well with many of his colleagues. He also mocked and belittled two enemy officers, Yu Jin and Mi Fang, who surrendered to Sun Quan. Sometime in the 220s, Sun Quan could no longer tolerate Yu Fan's disrespectful attitude and banished him to the remote Jiao Province in southern China. Yu Fan lived in exile for over a decade, during which he spent his time lecturing and writing. Even while living in exile, he was still concerned about state affairs, and he once wrote to Sun Quan to advise him against sending a fleet across the sea to buy horses from the warlord Gongsun Yuan in northeastern China, but was ignored. When the fleet was ambushed and destroyed by Wei general Tian Yu, Sun Quan regretted his decision and summoned Yu Fan back, but Yu Fan had already died by then. (Note: This account is per vol.72 of Zizhi Tongjian.)

== Historical sources on Yu Fan's life ==
The authoritative historical source on Yu Fan's life is the Records of the Three Kingdoms (Sanguozhi), written by Chen Shou in the third century. In the fifth century, Pei Songzhi annotated the Sanguozhi by incorporating information from other sources to Chen Shou's original work and adding his personal commentary. The alternative texts used in the annotations to the Sanguozhi are: Wu Shu (吳書; Book of Wu), by Wei Zhao; Yu Fan Biezhuan (虞翻別傳; Unofficial Biography of Yu Fan), by an unknown writer; Jiang Biao Zhuan (江表傳), by Yu Pu; Kuaiji Dianlu (會稽典錄; Esteemed Records of Kuaiji), by Yu Yu, a descendant of Yu Fan.

== Early life ==
Yu Fan was from Yuyao County (餘姚縣), Kuaiji Commandery, (Note: (虞翻字仲翔，會稽餘姚人也， ...) Sanguozhi vol. 57.) which is in present-day Yuyao, Zhejiang. The Yu clan, which he was from, was one of the four most influential clans in the Jiangdong region at the time. (Note: The four great clans of the Jiangdong region were the Gu (顧), Lu (陸), Yu (虞) and Wei (魏) clans. Some notable members from each clan were: Gu Yong, Gu Shao and Gu Tan of the Gu clan; Lu Xun, Lu Ji and Lu Kai of the Lu clan; Yu Fan of the Yu clan; and Wei Teng (魏騰) of the Wei clan.) At a young age, he was already known for being studious and extraordinary. When he was 11, a guest who came to visit his elder brother ignored the young Yu Fan when he walked past him. Yu Fan later wrote to the guest, "I heard that amber does not contain rotten plant material and that magnets do not attract bent needles. Is it not appropriate for you to ignore me when you walked past me?" The guest was very surprised after reading Yu Fan's letter. Yu Fan attracted greater attention after this incident. (Note: (吳書曰：翻少好學，有高氣。年十二，客有候其兄者，不過翻，翻追與書曰：「僕聞虎魄不取腐芥，磁石不受曲鍼，過而不存，不亦宜乎！」客得書奇之，由是見稱。) Wu Shu annotation in Sanguozhi vol. 57.)

== Service under Wang Lang ==
When Yu Fan became older, he served as an Officer of Merit (功曹) under Wang Lang, the Administrator (太守) of Kuaiji Commandery. In 196, the warlord Sun Ce, who was on a series of military campaigns in the Jiangdong (or Wu) region and had already conquered some territories, prepared to attack Kuaiji. Yu Fan was mourning the death of his father when he received news that Sun Ce was going to attack Kuaiji, so he rushed from his home to the commandery office and asked to meet Wang Lang. He was still dressed in mourning garments then. After entering the office, Yu Fan removed his mourning garments and urged Wang Lang to avoid confrontation with Sun Ce. Wang Lang ignored his advice and was defeated in battle by Sun Ce. (Note: (... 太守王朗命為功曹。孫策征會稽，翻時遭父喪，衰絰詣府門，朗欲就之，翻乃脫衰入見，勸朗避策。朗不能用，拒戰敗績， ...) Sanguozhi vol. 57.)

Yu Fan considered bringing Wang Lang north to Guangling Commandery (廣陵郡; around present-day Huai'an, Jiangsu) to evade Sun Ce, but Wang Lang, who believed in stories about the immortal Wang Fangping (王方平), wanted to travel to the "South Mountain" and take shelter there. Yu Fan then accompanied Wang Lang as they escaped from Kuaiji Commandery by sea and headed south to Houguan County (候官縣; in present-day Fuzhou, Fujian). At Houguan, the county chief initially denied them entry, but agreed after being persuaded by Yu Fan. In Houguan County, Wang Lang insisted on heading further south to Jiao Province to find the "South Mountain", but Yu Fan objected and said, "Those stories are nonsense. There is no South Mountain in Jiao Province for us to take shelter in." (Note: (吳書曰：翻始欲送朗到廣陵，朗惑王方平記，言「疾來邀我，南岳相求」，故遂南行。旣至候官，又欲投交州，翻諫朗曰：「此妄書耳，交州無南岳，安所投乎？」乃止。) Wu Shu annotation in Sanguozhi vol. 57.) (Note: (... 亡走浮海。翻追隨營護，到東部候官，候官長閉城不受，翻往說之，然後見納。) Sanguozhi vol. 57.) Wang Lang told Yu Fan later, "You have an elderly mother (to take care of). You can go back (to Kuaiji) now." (Note: (朗謂翻曰：「卿有老母，可以還矣。」) Sanguozhi vol. 57.)

The Yu Fan Biezhuan provided a different account of the above events. It mentioned that Wang Lang sent Yu Fan to meet Hua Xin, the Administrator of Yuzhang Commandery (豫章郡; around present-day Nanchang, Jiangxi), and discuss the forming of a military alliance between Wang Lang and Hua Xin against Sun Ce. However, Yu Fan turned back before reaching his destination because he received news that Sun Ce's army was advancing towards Kuaiji Commandery. His father died during that period of time. Yu Fan did not return home immediately because he felt that he was still on a mission. He travelled day and night to Houguan County to meet Wang Lang, who then sent him home to attend his father's funeral. (Note: (翻別傳曰：朗使翻見豫章太守華歆，圖起義兵。翻未至豫章，聞孫策向會稽，翻乃還。會遭父喪，以臣使有節，不敢過家，星行追朗至候官。朗遣翻還，然後奔喪。而傳云孫策之來，翻衰絰詣府門，勸朗避策，則為大異。) Yu Fan Biezhuan annotation and Pei Songzhi's note in Sanguozhi vol. 57.)

== Service under Sun Ce ==
Yu Fan was reinstated as an Officer of Merit by Sun Ce after he returned to Kuaiji Commandery. Sun Ce treated him like a friend and visited his residence. (Note: (翻旣歸，策復命為功曹，待以交友之禮，身詣翻第。) Sanguozhi vol. 57.) The Jiang Biao Zhuan recorded that Sun Ce wrote to Yu Fan: "I wish to work together with you from now. Please do not say I treated you like a lowly commandery-level officer." (Note: (江表傳曰：策書謂翻曰：「今日之事，當與卿共之，勿謂孫策作郡吏相待也。」) Jiang Biao Zhuan annotation in Sanguozhi vol. 57.)

Sun Ce was very fond of going on hunting excursions. Yu Fan told him: "You gathered a mob, used them to rein in the wandering scholar-gentry, and earned their fervent allegiance towards you. Even Emperor Gao of Han can't be compared to you. When you dress casually and venture out, the officials who accompany you usually don't have enough time to prepare for the trip, while the servants and soldiers are getting tiresome. A leader who doesn't behave in a serious manner doesn't command respect. The White Dragon transformed into a fish for fun and ended up being trapped by the fisherman Yuqie (豫且); the White Serpent behaved recklessly and ended up being slain by Liu Bang. I hope you will be more careful." Sun Ce replied: "You're right. However, sometimes, when I'm thinking hard, I feel frustrated if I were to sit down and think. As such, I venture out in search of insight and inspiration." (Note: (策好馳騁游獵，翻諫曰：「明府用烏集之衆，驅散附之士，皆得其死力，雖漢高帝不及也。至於輕出微行，從官不暇嚴，吏卒常苦之。夫君人者不重則不威，故白龍魚服，困於豫且，白蛇自放，劉季害之，願少留意。」策曰：「君言是也。然時有所思，端坐悒悒，有裨諶草創之計，是以行耳。」) Sanguozhi vol. 57.)

The Wu Shu recorded that Sun Ce once led a military expedition against the Shanyue and ventured into the hills alone after slaying the Shanyue chief and sending his men to pursue and destroy the remaining Shanyue forces. He encountered Yu Fan, who asked him where his bodyguards were. When Sun Ce told him that he had ordered his bodyguards to join the rest of his men in attacking the Shanyue, Yu Fan exclaimed, "This is so dangerous!" He then asked Sun Ce to dismount from his horse and said, "The terrain here is deep and dangerous. You can't control your horse well under such conditions, so you should travel on foot, guide your horse along, and arm yourself with a bow and arrows. I'm good in using a spear and I'll lead the way." After reaching flat ground, Sun Ce mounted his horse again and asked Yu Fan, "You don't have a horse. What are you going to do?" Yu Fan replied, "I can travel on foot. I'm capable of travelling 300 li in a day. Since the start of the campaigns, no one has been able to match my pace. You can try letting a horse run and I'll catch up with it on foot." They encountered a signaller at the main road. Sun Ce took the signaller's horn and blew it. His men recognised the sound of the horn and rushed there to join him. They patrolled the area and pacified the three commanderies. (Note: (吳書曰：策討山越，斬其渠帥，悉令左右分行逐賊，獨騎與翻相得山中。翻問左右安在，策曰：「悉行逐賊。」翻曰：「危事也！」令策下馬：「此草深，卒有驚急，馬不及縈策，但牽之，執弓矢以步。翻善用矛，請在前行。」得平地，勸策乘馬。策曰：「卿無馬柰何？」荅曰：「翻能步行，日可三百里，自征討以來，吏卒無及翻者，明府試躍馬，翻能疏步隨之。」行及大道，得一鼓吏，策取角自鳴之，部曲識聲，小大皆出，遂從周旋，平定三郡。) Wu Shu annotation in Sanguozhi vol. 57.)

=== Persuading Hua Xin to surrender to Sun Ce ===
The Jiang Biao Zhuan recorded that in 199, when Sun Ce was leading an army to attack Jiangxia Commandery (江夏郡; around present-day Xinzhou District, Wuhan, Hubei), he passed by Yuzhang Commandery along the way and wanted to conquer it. He invited Yu Fan to meet him and asked Yu Fan to persuade the Administrator, Hua Xin, to surrender. Yu Fan travelled to Yuzhang Commandery and succeeded in convincing Hua Xin to surrender by pointing out that he stood no chance against Sun Ce. Hua Xin surrendered to Sun Ce the following day. (Note: (江表傳曰：策討黃祖，旋軍欲過取豫章，特請翻語曰：「華子魚自有名字，然非吾敵也。加聞其戰具甚少，若不開門讓城，金鼓一震，不得無所傷害，卿便在前具宣孤意。」翻即奉命辭行，徑到郡，請被褠葛巾與敵相見，謂歆曰：「君自料名聲之在海內，孰與鄙郡故王府君？」歆曰：「不及也。」翻曰：「豫章資糧多少？器仗精否？士民勇果孰與鄙郡？」又曰：「不如也。」翻曰：「討逆將軍智略超世，用兵如神，前走劉揚州，君所親見，南定鄙郡，亦君所聞也。今欲守孤城，自料資糧，已知不足，不早為計，悔無及也。今大軍已次椒丘，僕便還去，明日日中迎檄不到者，與君辭矣。」翻旣去，歆明旦出城，遣吏迎策。) Jiang Biao Zhuan annotation in Sanguozhi vol. 57.)

After capturing Yuzhang Commandery, Sun Ce led his army back to Wu Commandery (around present-day Suzhou, Jiangsu), where he rewarded his subjects for their contributions. He told Yu Fan that he heard that many officials serving in the Han imperial capital, Xu (許; present-day Xuchang, Henan) had the impression that Jiangdong had no talents, so he wanted to send Yu Fan there to meet them and prove them wrong. He also considered sending Zhang Hong, but he still preferred Yu Fan. Yu Fan refused and said, "I'm like one of your treasured possessions. You might lose me if you show me to others and they want me. That's why I don't want to go there." Sun Ce laughed and said, "I still have military campaigns to complete so I can't return home yet. You're like my Xiao He. I intend to let you return to Kuaiji as an Officer of Merit to help me guard the commandery." Yu Fan travelled back to Kuaiji Commandery three days later. (Note: (策旣定豫章，引軍還吳，饗賜將士，計功行賞，謂翻曰：「孤昔再至壽春，見馬日磾，及與中州士大夫會，語我東方人多才耳，但恨學問不博，語議之間，有所不及耳。孤意猶謂未耳。卿博學洽聞，故前欲令卿一詣許，交見朝士，以折中國妄語兒。卿不願行，便使子綱；恐子綱不能結兒輩舌也。」翻曰：「翻是明府家寶，而以示人，人儻留之，則去明府良佐，故前不行耳。」策笑曰：「然。」因曰：「孤有征討事，未得還府，卿復以功曹為吾蕭何，守會稽耳。」後三日，便遣翻還郡。) Jiang Biao Zhuan annotation in Sanguozhi vol. 57.)

Pei Songzhi commented that the Jiang Biao Zhuan's account of Yu Fan persuading Hua Xin to surrender is less reliable as compared to another account from the Wu Li. He believed that Hua Xin was not militarily weaker than Wang Lang (as suggested in the Jiang Biao Zhuan) and he might have resisted Sun Ce if he was in control of Kuaiji Commandery instead of Yuzhang Commandery. (Note: (臣松之以為王、華二公於擾攘之時，抗猛銳之鋒，俱非所能。歆之名德，實高於朗，而江表傳述翻說華，云「海內名聲，孰與於王」，此言非也。然王公拒戰，華逆請服，實由孫策初起，名微衆寡，故王能舉兵，豈武勝哉？策後威力轉盛，勢不可敵，華量力而止，非必用仲翔之說也。若使易地而居，亦華戰王服耳。案吳歷載翻謂歆曰：「竊聞明府與王府君齊名中州，海內所宗，雖在東垂，常懷瞻仰。」歆荅曰：「孤不如王會稽。」翻復問：「不審豫章精兵，何如會稽？」對曰：「大不如也。」翻曰：「明府言不如王會稽，謙光之譚耳；精兵不如會稽，實如尊教。」因述孫策才略殊異，用兵之奇，歆乃荅云當去。翻出，歆遣吏迎策。二說有不同，此說為勝也。) Pei Songzhi's annotation in Sanguozhi vol. 57.)

=== Events after Sun Ce's death ===
Yu Fan was appointed as the Chief (長) of Fuchun County (富春縣; in present-day Fuyang, Zhejiang) later. When Sun Ce died in the year 200, many county-level officials wanted to travel to Wu Commandery to attend his funeral. Yu Fan disapproved because he was worried that the Shanyue tribes would take advantage of their absence to cause trouble in the counties, hence he remained in Fuchun County but wore mourning garments to express his grief. The other officials followed suit and the area was peaceful. (Note: (翻出為富春長。策薨，諸長吏並欲出赴喪，翻曰：「恐鄰縣山民或有姧變，遠委城郭，必致不虞。」因留制服行喪。諸縣皆効之，咸以安寧。) Sanguozhi vol. 57.)

The Wu Shu and Kuaiji Dianlu recorded an incident involving Sun Hao (孫暠), a cousin of Sun Ce. Sun Hao held the appointment of General of the Household Who Establishes Martial Might (定武中郎將) and was stationed at Wucheng County (烏程縣; in present-day Huzhou, Zhejiang). After Sun Ce died and was succeeded by his younger brother, Sun Quan, Sun Hao rallied his subordinates, formed an army, and prepared to attack Kuaiji Commandery. When Yu Fan heard about it, he ordered the people in Kuaiji Commandery to hold their positions and await orders from their new lord (Sun Quan) while he met Sun Hao in person. (Note: (吳書曰：策薨，權統事。定武中郎將暠，策之從兄也，屯烏程，整帥吏士，欲取會稽。會稽聞之，使民守城以俟嗣主之命，因令人告諭暠。) Wu Shu annotation in Sanguozhi vol. 57.) He warned Sun Hao: "Our former lord had passed away. Sun Quan is now our new lord. I am prepared to lead everyone in Kuaiji to defend the commandery and eliminate any threat to our new lord. You better reconsider your decision." Sun Hao retreated. (Note: (會稽典錄載翻說暠曰：「討逆明府，不竟天年。今攝事統衆，宜在孝廉，翻已與一郡吏士，嬰城固守，必欲出一旦之命，為孝廉除害，惟執事圖之。」於是暠退。) Kuaiji Dianlu annotation in Sanguozhi vol. 57.)

Pei Songzhi pointed out a discrepancy between the Sanguozhi account and the Wu Shu and Kuaiji Dianlu accounts about the appointment held by Yu Fan around 200 when Sun Ce died. The Sanguozhi mentioned that Yu Fan was the Chief of Fuchun County, but the Wu Shu and Kuaiji Dianlu suggested that Yu Fan was still serving as an Officer of Merit in Kuaiji Commandery at the time. (Note: (臣松之案：此二書所說策亡之時，翻猶為功曹，與本傳不同。) Pei Songzhi's annotation in Sanguozhi vol. 57.)

== Service under Sun Quan ==
Yu Fan was later nominated as a maocai (茂才; an outstanding civil servant). The Han central government in Xu (許; present-day Xuchang, Henan) offered him a position to be an Imperial Clerk (侍御史) but he declined the offer. The warlord Cao Cao, who then held the nominal appointment of Minister of Works (司空) even though he controlled the central government, also wanted to recruit Yu Fan to serve in his office. (Note: (後翻州舉茂才，漢召為侍御史，曹公為司空辟，皆不就。) Sanguozhi vol. 57.) When Yu Fan heard about it, he rejected Cao Cao's offer and remarked, "The robber Zhi wishes to use his excess wealth to corrupt good people." (Note: (吳書曰：翻聞曹公辟，曰：「盜跖欲以餘財污良家邪？」遂拒不受。) Wu Shu annotation in Sanguozhi vol. 57.)

Yu Fan made annotations to the I Ching and sent his writings to Kong Rong, the Minister Steward (少府) in the Han central government. Kong Rong praised Yu Fan's writings and remarked that they made him realise that there was "more about the beauty of the southeast than just the bamboo arrows of Kuaiji". Zhang Hong, another official serving in Kuaiji Commandery, also wrote mentioned Yu Fan in a letter to Kong Rong: "Scholars used to scorn Yu Zhongxiang. A beautiful piece of jade may look simple on the outside, but it sparkles after it is polished. The ridicule he faced then had no negative effect on him." (Note: (翻與少府孔融書，并示以所著易注。融荅書曰：「聞延陵之理樂，覩吾子之治易，乃知東南之美者，非徒會稽之竹箭也。又觀象雲物，察應寒溫，原其禍福，與神合契，可謂探賾窮通者也。」會稽東部都尉張紘又與融書曰：「虞仲翔前頗為論者所侵，美寶為質，彫摩益光，不足以損。」) Sanguozhi vol. 57.)

Sun Quan appointed Yu Fan as a Cavalry Commandant (騎都尉). Yu Fan was known for being very candid and direct in giving advice to Sun Quan, but, in doing so, he offended his lord on many occasions and made him unhappy. Besides, he was known for exhibiting socially deviant behaviour, hence he did not get along well with others and was slandered by them. Sun Quan confined him in Jing County (涇縣), Danyang Commandery (丹楊郡; in present-day Chun'an County, Zhejiang). (Note: (孫權以為騎都尉。翻數犯顏諫爭，權不能恱，又性不協俗，多見謗毀，坐徙丹楊涇縣。) Sanguozhi vol. 57.)

=== Role in the conquest of Jing Province ===
In 219, Sun Quan's general Lü Meng planned to attack Liu Bei's territories in southern Jing Province, which were guarded by Liu Bei's general Guan Yu. He claimed that he was ill and returned to Jianye (建業; present-day Nanjing, Jiangsu) to put Guan Yu off guard. He also managed to persuade Sun Quan to release Yu Fan from confinement and let Yu Fan accompany him, because Yu Fan had medical skills and could help to treat his illness. (Note: (呂蒙圖取關羽，稱疾還建業，以翻兼知醫術，請以自隨，亦欲因此令翻得釋也。) Sanguozhi vol. 57.)

Later that year, during the invasion of Jing Province, after Lü Meng received the surrender of Mi Fang, the Administrator of Nan Commandery (南郡; around present-day Jiangling County, Hubei), he did not immediately order his forces to occupy the city and instead held celebrations on the beach. Yu Fan reminded Lü Meng, "As of now, only General Mi has surrendered to us. We cannot trust that everyone in the city is willing to surrender too. Why are you celebrating here instead of quickly taking control of the city?" Lü Meng followed Yu Fan's advice. There was actually a planned ambush in the city but it was not successfully carried out because Lü Meng heeded Yu Fan's warning in time. (Note: (後蒙舉軍西上，南郡太守麋芳開城出降。蒙未據郡城而作樂沙上，翻謂蒙曰：「今區區一心者麋將軍也，城中之人豈可盡信，何不急入城持其管籥乎？」蒙即從之。時城中有伏計，賴翻謀不行。) Sanguozhi vol. 57.)

After Guan Yu was defeated, Sun Quan ordered Yu Fan to use divination to predict the outcome, and Yu Fan concluded, "He'll lose his head within two days." Yu Fan's prediction came true. Sun Quan remarked, "You may not be as good as Fuxi, but you're comparable to Dongfang Shuo." (Note: (關羽旣敗，權使翻筮之，得兌下坎上，節，五爻變之臨，翻曰：「不出二日，必當斷頭。」果如翻言。權曰：「卿不及伏羲，可與東方朔為比矣。」) Sanguozhi vol. 57.)

=== Mocking Yu Jin ===
Cao Cao's general Yu Jin was captured by Guan Yu during the Battle of Fancheng and was held captive in Nan Commandery. After Sun Quan seized control of Nan Commandery, he released Yu Jin and treated him with respect. One day, when Sun Quan travelling on horseback, he asked Yu Jin to ride beside him. Yu Fan saw that and shouted at Yu Jin, "You're a surrendered prisoner-of-war. How dare you ride side-by-side with my lord!" He wanted to hit Yu Jin with his horsewhip but Sun Quan ordered him to stop. Later, when Yu Jin joined Sun Quan in a feast with his subjects on board a ship, he shed tears when he heard music being played. Yu Fan mocked him, "Are you pretending to be pitiful?" Sun Quan was very unhappy with Yu Fan. (Note: (魏將于禁為羽所獲，繫在城中，權至釋之，請與相見。他日，權乘馬出，引禁併行，翻呵禁曰：「爾降虜，何敢與吾君齊馬首乎！」欲抗鞭擊禁，權呵止之。後權于樓船會羣臣飲，禁聞樂流涕，翻又曰：「汝欲以偽求免邪？」權悵然不平。) Sanguozhi vol. 57.)

In 220, after Cao Cao died, his son Cao Pi forced Emperor Xian to abdicate in his favour, thereby ending the Han dynasty. Cao Pi then established the state of Cao Wei. Sun Quan made peace with Cao Pi and planned to send Yu Jin back to Wei, but Yu Fan objected and urged him to execute Yu Jin. Sun Quan did not listen to Yu Fan. On the day of Yu Jin's departure, Sun Quan's subjects, including Yu Fan, came to see him off. Yu Fan told Yu Jin, "Don't you ever think there are no great men in Wu. It is just that my advice wasn't heeded." Despite being humiliated by Yu Fan during his stay in Wu, Yu Jin spoke highly of Yu Fan when he returned to Wei. Cao Pi even prepared a seat for Yu Fan (Note: (吳書曰：後權與魏和，欲遣禁還歸北，翻復諫曰：「禁敗數萬衆，身為降虜，又不能死。北習軍政，得禁必不如所規。還之雖無所損，猶為放盜，不如斬以令三軍，示為人臣有二心者。」權不聽。羣臣送禁，翻謂禁曰：「卿勿謂吳無人，吾謀適不用耳。」禁雖為翻所惡，然猶盛歎翻，魏文帝常為翻設虛坐。) Wu Shu annotation in Sanguozhi vol. 57.) even though he knew that it would probably remain permanently unoccupied.

=== Showing disrespect to Sun Quan ===
In 220, Cao Pi made Sun Quan a vassal king under the title "King of Wu" (吳王) after Sun Quan pledged allegiance to him. Sun Quan threw a feast to celebrate with his subjects. During the feast, he moved around and personally poured wine for his subjects. When he came to Yu Fan, he saw that Yu Fan was lying on the ground and appeared to be drunk, so he walked away. Yu Fan immediately sat up as soon as Sun Quan walked away. Sun Quan thought that Yu Fan was deliberately snubbing him, so he turned furious, drew his sword and wanted to kill Yu Fan. His subjects were all shocked and fearful. Only Liu Ji stood up, grabbed Sun Quan, and pleaded with him to spare Yu Fan. Liu Ji said, "If Your Majesty kills a good man when you're drunk, even if Yu Fan is in the wrong, who would understand the truth? Your Majesty is famous and respected because you showed acceptance and tolerance towards virtuous and talented people over the years. Is it worth ruining your good reputation in just one day?" Sun Quan said, "If Cao Mengde can kill Kong Wenju, why can't I do the same to Yu Fan?" Liu Ji replied, "Mengde killed virtuous people recklessly, hence he didn't win over people's hearts. Your Majesty promotes moral values and righteousness, and wishes to be compared to Yao and Shun. Why are you comparing yourself to him?" Sun Quan then spared Yu Fan and instructed his men to ignore his orders in the future if he was not sober when he ordered someone to be executed. (Note: (權旣為吳王，歡宴之末，自起行酒，翻伏地陽醉，不持。權去，翻起坐。權於是大怒，手劒欲擊之，侍坐者莫不惶遽，惟大司農劉基起抱權諫曰：「大王以三爵之後，手殺善士，雖翻有罪，天下孰知之？且大王以能容賢畜衆，故海內望風，今一朝棄之，可乎？」權曰：「曹孟德尚殺孔文舉，孤於虞翻何有哉？」基曰：「孟德輕害士人，天下非之。大王躬行德義，欲與堯、舜比隆，何得自喻於彼乎？」翻由是得免。權因勑左右，自今酒後言殺，皆不得殺。) Sanguozhi vol. 57.)

=== Insulting Mi Fang ===
Yu Fan once sailed along the river and encountered Mi Fang. The sailors on Mi Fang's boat wanted Yu Fan's boat to give way, so they shouted, "Make way for the General's boat!" Yu Fan replied angrily, "How can you serve a lord when you've already abandoned the values of loyalty and righteousness? Are you still fit to be called a 'General' after you've lost two of your previous lord's strongholds?" Mi Fang did not reply and he drew the curtains on his boat and instructed his men to give way. (Note: (翻甞乘船行，與麋芳相逢，芳船上人多欲令翻自避，先驅曰：「避將軍船！」翻厲聲曰：「失忠與信，何以事君？傾人二城，而稱將軍，可乎？」芳闔戶不應而遽避之。) Sanguozhi vol. 57.)

In another incident, Yu Fan was riding in a carriage when he passed by Mi Fang's garrison along the way. Mi Fang's men closed the gates so Yu Fan was unable to pass through. Yu Fan was furious and he shouted, "You leave the gates open when they are supposed to be closed, and you close them when they are supposed to be opened. Is this what you should be doing?" Mi Fang felt ashamed when he heard Yu Fan's remark. (Note: (後翻乘車行，又經芳營門，吏閉門，車不得過。翻復怒曰：「當閉反開，當開反閉，豈得事宜邪？」芳聞之，有慙色。) Sanguozhi vol. 57.)

=== Exile to Jiao Province and death ===
Yu Fan was known to be very direct in his speech and there were many instances when he offended people while he was drunk. Once, when Sun Quan and Zhang Zhao were talking about immortals, Yu Fan pointed at Zhang Zhao and shouted, "They are all dead people, yet you call them immortals. How can there be immortals in this world?" At this point, Sun Quan could no longer tolerate Yu Fan so he exiled him to Jiao Province. While he was in exile, Yu Fan held lectures and had hundreds of students. (Note: (翻性疏直，數有酒失。權與張昭論及神仙，翻指昭曰：「彼皆死人，而語神仙，世豈有仙人也！」權積怒非一，遂徙翻交州。雖處罪放，而講學不倦，門徒常數百人。) Sanguozhi vol. 57.) He also annotated ancient classics such as the Daodejing, Lunyu and Guoyu. (Note: (又為老子、論語、國語訓注，皆傳於世。) Sanguozhi vol. 57.) He was friendly with Ding Lan (丁覽) and Xu Ling (徐陵). Both of them started their careers as low-ranking officers serving in county offices, but their lives changed after they met Yu Fan because they rose through the ranks and became famous later on. (Note: (初，山陰丁覽，太末徐陵，或在縣吏之中，或衆所未識，翻一見之，便與友善，終成顯名。) Sanguozhi vol. 57.)

The Yu Fan Biezhuan recorded that in 229, after Sun Quan proclaimed himself emperor and established the state of Eastern Wu, Yu Fan wrote a memorial to congratulate him. He also expressed remorse for his past mistakes and hinted that he hoped that Sun Quan would allow him to return to Jianye (建業; in present-day Nanjing, Jiangsu). (Note: (翻別傳曰：權即尊號，翻因上書曰：「陛下膺明聖之德，體舜、禹之孝，歷運當期，順天濟物。奉承策命，臣獨抃舞。罪棄兩絕，拜賀無階，仰瞻宸極，且喜且悲。臣伏自刻省，命輕雀鼠，性輶毫釐，罪惡莫大，不容於誅，昊天罔極，全宥九載，退當念戮，頻受生活，復偷視息。臣年耳順，思咎憂憤，形容枯悴，髮白齒落，雖未能死，自悼終沒，不見宮闕百官之富，不覩皇輿金軒之飾，仰觀巍巍衆民之謠，傍聽鍾鼓侃然之樂，永隕海隅，棄骸絕域，不勝悲慕，逸豫大慶，恱以忘罪。」) Yu Fan Biezhuan annotation in Sanguozhi vol. 57.) Yu Fan spent more than a decade living in exile. He died at the age of 70 (by East Asian age reckoning). (Note: (在南十餘年，年七十卒。) Sanguozhi vol. 57.) Sun Quan permitted Yu Fan's family to bring his remains back to Yuyao County for burial. He also freed them from exile. (Note: (歸葬舊墓，妻子得還。) Sanguozhi vol. 57.)

When Yu Fan was living in exile, he was still very concerned about state affairs. For example, he strongly opposed Sun Quan's idea of sending envoys across the sea to purchase horses from the warlord Gongsun Yuan in Liaodong (in northeastern China). However, he did not dare to voice his opinion directly to Sun Quan, so he asked Lü Dai to help him pass his message to Sun Quan, but Lü Dai did not do so. Sun Quan heard about it later and was so angry with Yu Fan for opposing his decision that he banished Yu Fan further south to Mengling County (猛陵縣), Cangwu Commandery (蒼梧郡), which is located in present-day Guangxi. (Note: (吳書曰：翻雖在徙棄，心不忘國，常憂五谿宜討，以遼東海絕，聽人使來屬，尚不足取，今去人財以求馬，旣非國利，又恐無獲。欲諫不敢，作表以示呂岱，岱不報，為愛憎所白，復徙蒼梧猛陵。) Wu Shu annotation in Sanguozhi vol. 57.) (Note: In the Sanguozhi, there was a discrepancy on when Tian Yu attacked Zhou He and co. Cao Rui's biography dated the attack to the 10th month of the 6th year of the Taihe era. However, in Sun Quan's biography, the attack was dated to the 9th month of the 1st year of the Jiahe era. The two months correspond to 1 to 29 Nov and 2 to 30 Oct 232 in the Julian calendar.) According to the Jiang Biao Zhuan, Sun Quan then sent a fleet to attack Gongsun Yuan, but he regretted his decision later when storms caused the fleet to sustain heavy damage and losses. He remembered Yu Fan and quickly sent messengers to Jiao Province to fetch Yu Fan back to Jianye, but Yu Fan was already dead by then. (Note: (江表傳曰：後權遣將士至遼東，於海中遭風，多所沒失，權悔之，乃令曰：「昔趙簡子稱諸君之唯唯，不如周舍之諤諤。虞翻亮直，善於盡言，國之周舍也。前使翻在此，此役不成。」促下問交州，翻若尚存者，給其人船，發遣還都；若以亡者，送喪還本郡，使兒子仕宦。會翻已終。) Jiang Biao Zhuan annotation in Sanguozhi vol. 57.) (Note: This account in Jiang Biao Zhuan may be erroneous as the "heavy damage and losses" was actually due to Gongsun Yuan confiscating the troops and treasure sent by Sun Quan after Gongsun nominally submitted to Wu.)

== Family ==
Yu Fan had 11 sons. (Note: (翻有十一子， ...) Sanguozhi vol. 57.) Among them, the notable ones were Yu Si, Yu Zhong, Yu Song and Yu Bing. The names of his other sons were not recorded in history.

== Appraisal ==
Chen Shou, who wrote Yu Fan's biography in the Records of the Three Kingdoms, noted that Yu Fan was very candid and direct in his speech. He also commented that Sun Quan's lack of tolerance for Yu Fan was a sign that Sun Quan was not as magnanimous as he seemed. (Note: (評曰：虞翻古之狂直，固難免乎末世，然權不能容，非曠宇也。) Sanguozhi vol. 57.)

== In Romance of the Three Kingdoms ==
Yu Fan appeared as a character in the 14th-century historical novel Romance of the Three Kingdoms, which romanticises the history of the late Eastern Han dynasty and the Three Kingdoms period. In chapter 43, Yu Fan was one of the Wu scholars who debated with Zhuge Liang over Sun Quan's decision to ally with Liu Bei against Cao Cao. In chapter 75, during Lü Meng's invasion of Jing Province, Yu Fan succeeded in persuaded Guan Yu's subordinate Fu Shiren to surrender.

== See also ==
- Lists of people of the Three Kingdoms
