= Yuyao =

Yuyao 余姚市
- County-level City
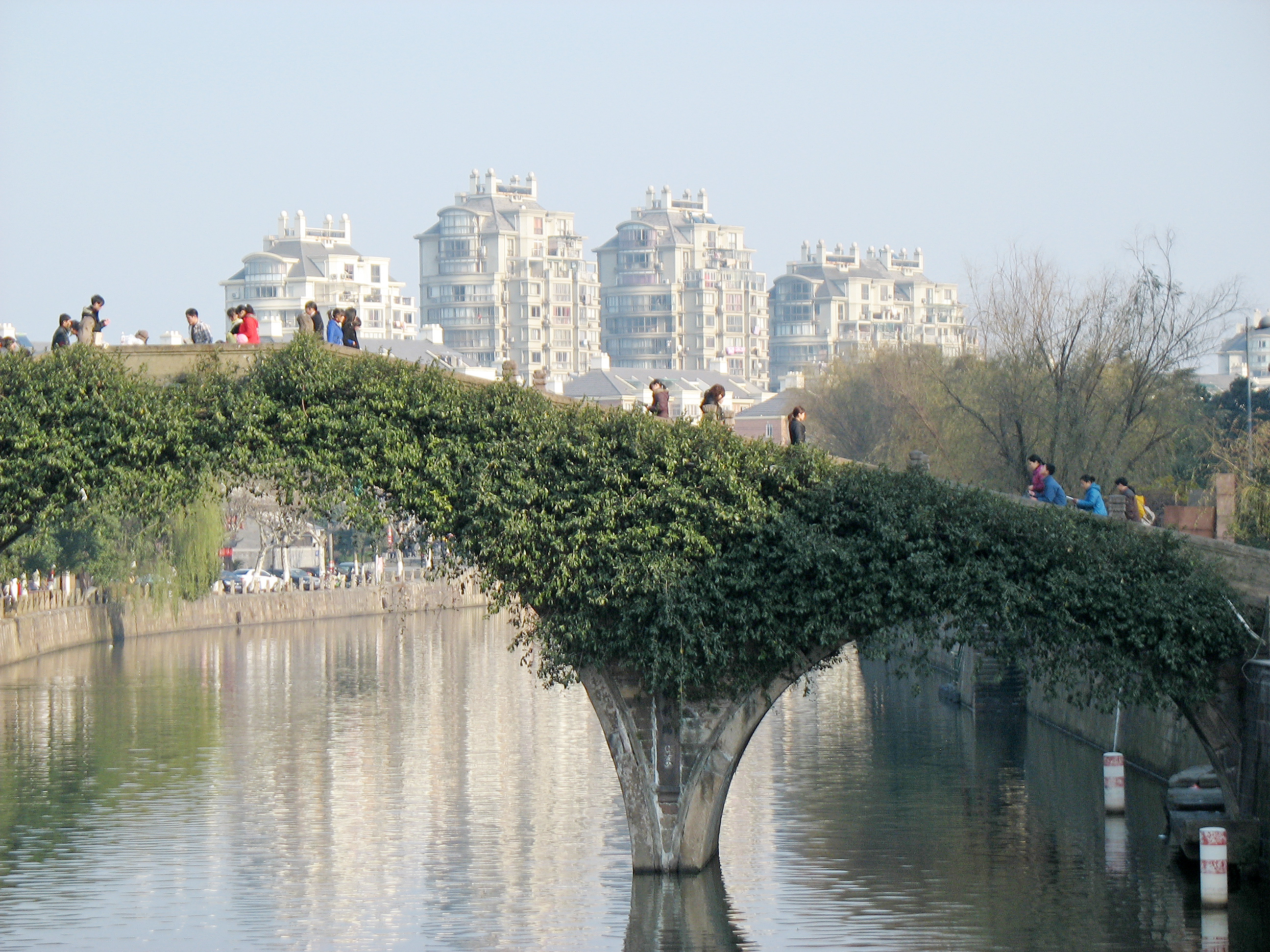
- The Tongji Bridge over the Yaojiang River in downtown Yuyao.

- Yuyao in Ningbo

- Location in Zhejiang
- Coordinates: 30°03′N 121°09′E
- Country: People's Republic of China
- Province: Zhejiang
- Sub-provincial city: Ningbo

Area
  - County-level City: 1,500.8 km^{2} (579.5 sq mi)
  - Urban: 1,500.8 km^{2} (579.5 sq mi)
  - Metro: 2,861.4 km^{2} (1,104.8 sq mi)

Population (2020 census)
  - County-level City: 1,254,032
  - Density: 835.58/km^{2} (2,164.1/sq mi)
  - Urban: 1,254,032
  - Urban density: 835.58/km^{2} (2,164.1/sq mi)
  - Metro: 3,083,520
  - Metro density: 1,077.6/km^{2} (2,791.0/sq mi)
- Time zone: UTC+8 (China Standard)
- Postal code: 315400
- Area code: 0574
- Website: www.yy.gov.cn

Yuyao (simplified Chinese: 余姚; traditional Chinese: 餘姚; pinyin: Yúyáo) is a county-level city in the northeast of Zhejiang province, China. It is under the jurisdiction of the sub-provincial city of Ningbo.

It is located 40 km (25 mi) west of central Ningbo, 120 km (75 mi) east of Hangzhou, bordering Hangzhou Bay in the north. Yuyao covers an area of 1,527 km^{2} (590 sq mi).

== Demographics ==
As of the 2020 census, its population was 1,254,032. Its built-up (or metro) area with the county-level city of Cixi largely conurbated, had 3,083,520 inhabitants. However, recently the migrated workers and their families have increase the total population to about 1.26 million, but they do not show up in the official census and other related statistics data.

== Geography and climate ==
Yuyao lies in a subtropical monsoon zone, rich in sunshine and rain fall, warm and humid, distinct in the four seasons. The mean annual sunshine is 2,061 hours and the annual rate of sunshine is 47%. The mean annual temperature is 16 degrees Celsius, and the coldest months perennially are January and February, the hottest are July and August. The mean annual precipitation is around 1,300 millimeters and changes greatly from year to year. The hyetal distribution is also uneven during a year, and the rainfall centers on East Asian rainy season (梅雨) (aka bai-u rainy period) from April to June and typhoon period from July to December.

Yuyao offers a wide variety of landscape from wide open ocean in Hangzhou Bay, rice fields in fertile plains to high spires in Siming Mountains. Yaojiang River originates in Siming Mountains in the south where the Ninth Fantasy world of Taoism is located. Yaojiang River goes through the county and extends eastward into East China Sea as well as Pacific Ocean.

In 2021, Typhoon In-fa caused 951.0 mm of rainfall to fall in Yuyao.

Climate data for Yuyao, elevation 38 m (125 ft), (1991–2020 normals, extremes 1981–present)
Month	Jan	Feb	Mar	Apr	May	Jun	Jul	Aug	Sep	Oct	Nov	Dec	Year
Record high °C (°F)	24.5 (76.1)	29.8 (85.6)	33.5 (92.3)	36.0 (96.8)	37.6 (99.7)	39.0 (102.2)	41.7 (107.1)	41.3 (106.3)	38.0 (100.4)	37.0 (98.6)	31.7 (89.1)	25.6 (78.1)	41.7 (107.1)
Mean daily maximum °C (°F)	9.0 (48.2)	11.4 (52.5)	15.8 (60.4)	22.0 (71.6)	26.7 (80.1)	29.3 (84.7)	34.2 (93.6)	33.3 (91.9)	28.6 (83.5)	23.7 (74.7)	18.1 (64.6)	11.8 (53.2)	22.0 (71.6)
Daily mean °C (°F)	5.2 (41.4)	7.1 (44.8)	11.0 (51.8)	16.6 (61.9)	21.6 (70.9)	24.9 (76.8)	29.2 (84.6)	28.6 (83.5)	24.5 (76.1)	19.3 (66.7)	13.7 (56.7)	7.5 (45.5)	17.4 (63.4)
Mean daily minimum °C (°F)	2.4 (36.3)	3.9 (39.0)	7.4 (45.3)	12.5 (54.5)	17.6 (63.7)	21.6 (70.9)	25.4 (77.7)	25.3 (77.5)	21.4 (70.5)	15.9 (60.6)	10.3 (50.5)	4.4 (39.9)	14.0 (57.2)
Record low °C (°F)	−6.5 (20.3)	−4.8 (23.4)	−2.6 (27.3)	1.2 (34.2)	8.5 (47.3)	13.3 (55.9)	17.5 (63.5)	19.3 (66.7)	12.2 (54.0)	3.4 (38.1)	−1.9 (28.6)	−8.1 (17.4)	−8.1 (17.4)
Average precipitation mm (inches)	95.0 (3.74)	83.5 (3.29)	127.2 (5.01)	106.8 (4.20)	119.2 (4.69)	210.9 (8.30)	152.5 (6.00)	205.1 (8.07)	176.6 (6.95)	95.9 (3.78)	88.3 (3.48)	77.8 (3.06)	1,538.8 (60.57)
Average precipitation days (≥ 0.1 mm)	12.9	12.0	15.1	13.9	14.2	16.1	12.6	14.3	12.9	9.4	11.0	10.6	155
Average snowy days	3.2	2.2	0.6	0	0	0	0	0	0	0	0.1	1.2	7.3
Average relative humidity (%)	76	75	74	71	73	80	75	77	79	77	77	75	76
Mean monthly sunshine hours	101.5	106.9	130.1	156.3	168.0	138.7	229.1	210.1	155.5	150.9	120.3	118.4	1,785.8
Percentage possible sunshine	31	34	35	40	40	33	54	52	42	43	38	37	40
Source: China Meteorological Administration All-time October high

== History ==
Yuyao is well known for its rich heritage of civilization. The Neolithic Hemudu culture formed in Yuyao about 5,000 B.C. is one of the earliest sites of human civilization on earth. The material and ethical relics revealed large-scale rice plantation and other agricultural activities, hurdle style architecture, paddling and boating and respecting birds and sun.

Yuyao also produced many famous scholars in history—for example, Yan Zi-Ling during the Han dynasty; Yu Fan during the Three Kingdoms period; Yu Xi during the Jin dynasty; Yu Shinan during the Sui and Tang dynasties; and Wang Yangming, Zhu Shunshui, and Huang Zongxi during the Ming dynasty. Wang Yangming and Huang Zongxi were ranked among China's top 10 ideologists. Yuyao was then named as "the Most Famous County" and "the Famous State on Literature". During the Second Sino-Japanese War, Yuyao was one of China's 19 bases against the Japanese and was the center of anti-Japanese bases of eastern Zhejiang province.

== Administrative divisions ==
Subdistricts:

- Lanjiang Subdistrict (兰江街道), Ditang Subdistrict (低塘街道), Fengshan Subdistrict (凤山街道), Langxia Subdistrict (朗霞街道), Lizhou Subdistrict (梨洲街道), Yangming Subdistrict (阳明街道)

Towns:

- Dalan (大岚镇), Dayin (大隐镇), Huangjiabu (黄家埠镇), Hemudu (河姆渡镇), Lubu (陆埠镇), Liangnong (梁弄镇), Linshan (临山镇), Mushan (牟山镇), Mazhu (马渚镇), Simingshan (四明山镇), SImen (泗门镇), Sanqishi (三七市镇), Xiaocao'e (小曹娥镇), Zhangting (丈亭镇)

The only township is Luting Township (鹿亭乡)

== Economy ==
Yuyao is known as a place for rice and fish. Its economy has been booming as private enterprises dominate after the economic reform began in late 1970s. In 2007, GDP will reach RMB 34 billions, with double digit annual growth rates over the past 20 years. It ranked as one of the top-20 counties in terms of comprehensive economic strength out of all the 2100 counties in China. The industry products are mainly electric appliances, plastic moulding, machinery and textiles. High-tech industries such as materials, optical, electro-mechanical integration and fine chemical industry are developing rapidly. The main agriculture, forestry and animal husbandry products of Yuyao are tea, fruits like waxberry and mandarin orange, bamboo, silkworm, fowl, livestock and fish. Fresh produce is available in all seasons.

== Transport ==
The Shanghai-Hangzhou-Ningbo Expressway and China National Highway 329 and Shanghai-Hangzhou-Ningbo Railway go through Yuyao. The world's longest trans-oceanic bridge – the 36 km (22 mi) Hangzhou Bay Bridge – was recently completed construction near the northern border of Yuyao. It reduced the cross bay traffic to only 80 km (50 mi) from the current 420 km (260 mi) section of Shanghai-Hangzhou-Ningbo Expressway around Hangzhou Bay.

== Tourism ==
Tourism in Yuyao is based on the city's archaeological heritage, historical sites, and natural landscapes. The city is particularly associated with the Hemudu culture, a Neolithic culture dating to the 5th millennium BC, as well as the Siming mountains in southern Yuyao. Other tourist attractions include museums, historic temples, traditional villages, lakes, and mountain scenic areas.

=== Archaeological and cultural sites ===
- Hemudu Site and Museum: An archaeological site and museum complex associated with the Hemudu culture, a Neolithic culture dating to the 5th millennium BC. The site contains remains of prehistoric settlements and evidence of early rice cultivation.
- Tianluoshan Site: A Neolithic settlement site featuring the remains of wooden structures, storage pits, wells, and other components of a prehistoric settlement. Excavations have also uncovered pottery, stone tools, plant remains, and eviddence of rice cultivation.
- Jingtoushan Site: A prehistoric shell-midden site with remains of an early coastal settlement. Excavations have uncovered large quantities of shells, pottery, stone tools, bone and abtler artifacts, as well as remains of plants and animals.
- Former Residence of Wang Yangming: A historic residence commemorating the life and legacy of Wang Yangming. The complex includes reconstructed historical buildings, exhibition spaces, and displays related to Wang Yangming's life, philosophy, and connection with Yuyao.
- Yangming Park: Yangming Park in Yuyao sits at the foot of Longquan Mountain, a city park themed on Wang Yangming with woods, pavilions and a viewing platform overlooking the downtown.
- Wugui Tower: Wugui Tower in Liangnong built in 1807 in the Qing Dynasty. And it's a famous ancient library known as "the Second Library in Eastern Zhejiang", once housing over 50000 volumes of ancient books.
- Tongji Bridge: Spanning the Yao River in downtown Yuyao, this grand three-arch stone archway earns the title "The First Bridge in Eastern Zhejiang" and links the old city's north and south districts.

=== Natural scenic sites and parks ===
- Siming Mountain National Forest Park: A National Forest Park is a national forest park located in Simingshan Town. It features forested mountains, valleys, lakes and Waterfalls.
- Siming Lake: A lake in LiangnongTown. Surrounded by hills, it is known for its natural scenery and lakeside landscape.
- Danshan Chishui Scenic Area: A mountain scenic area in Dalan Town.Its landscape includes red rock formations, streams, waterfalls and forested hills.
- Baishuichong waterfall: A waterfall near Liangnong Town. It is situated in a mountainous landscape characterized by rocky terrain and streams.
- Zhedong Jiuzhaigou: A natural scenic area in Yuyao. It features forested hills, streams, pools, waterfalls and distinctive rock formations.
